= Medallion (architecture) =

Round or oval decoration used in architecture

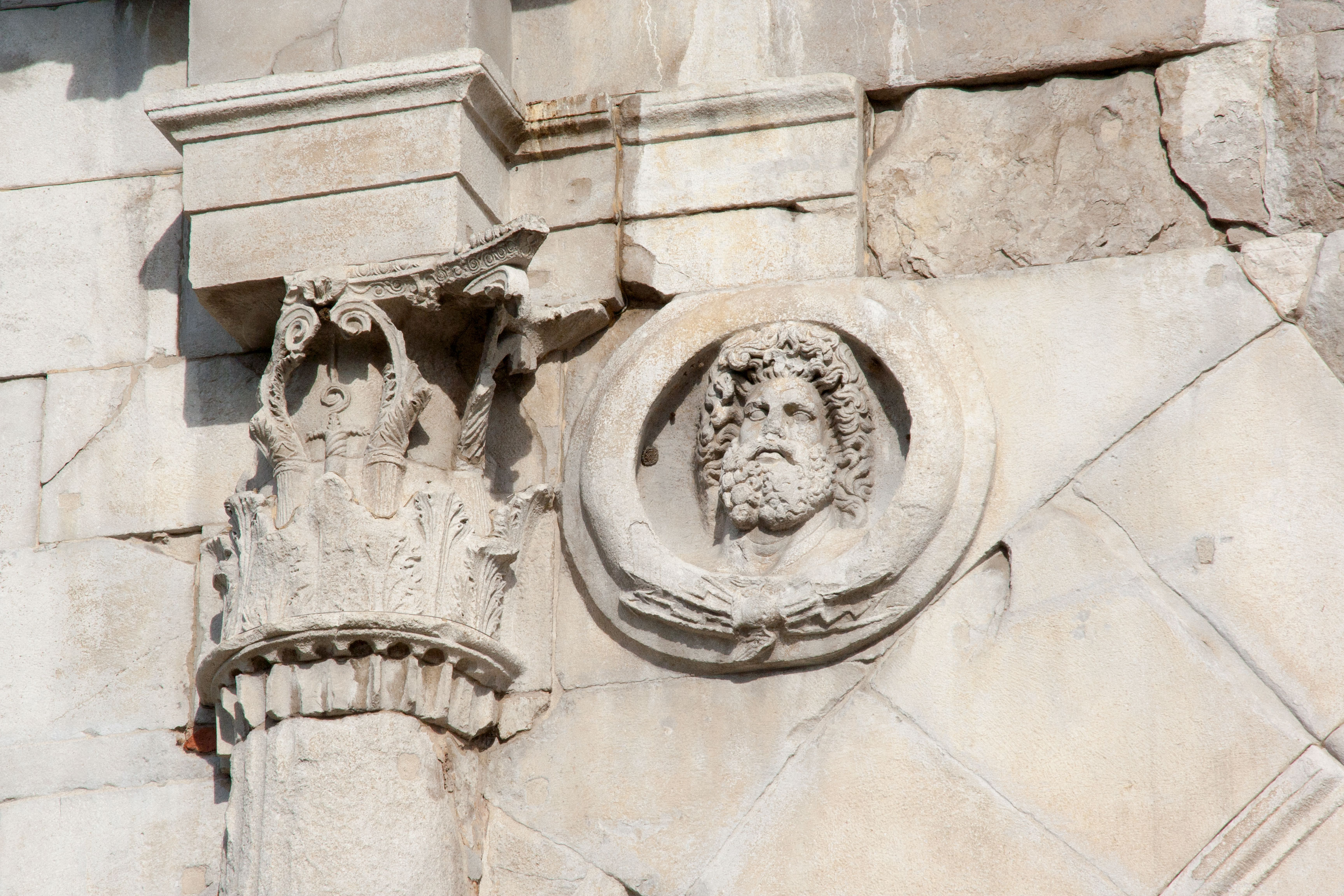
Roman medallion or imago clipeata on the Arch of Augustus, Rimini, Italy, 27 BC

A medallion is a round or oval ornament that frames a sculptural or pictorial decoration in any context, but typically a façade, an interior, a monument, or a piece of furniture or equipment.

Ancient Roman round versions are called an imago clipeata, from the clipeus or Roman round shield.

This was a popular form of decoration in neoclassical architecture. The frame and portrait were carved as one, in marble for interiors, and in stone for exterior walls.

It is also the name of a scene that is inset into a larger stained glass window.

Ceiling medallions, also called ceiling roses or ceiling ornaments, were often made of cast plaster and were sometimes the site of hanging lamp or chandelier.

== Gallery ==
The following gallery shows how medallions changed over time, from style to style, and how decorated or simple they were. Sometimes they were one of the key ornaments of a style, like the Louis XVI style of the 18th century and the Beaux Arts architecture of the Belle Époque. They also came in different shapes, not just circles and ovals. Many Art Deco medallions are octagonal, showing the use of angular and stylized shapes that characterize the style, inspired by Cubism. They also had different reliefs inside over time. For example, some medieval Moldavian churches are decorated with colourful medallions that feature animals and mythological creatures, while many oval Neoclassical ones feature profiles, inspired by Roman cameos.

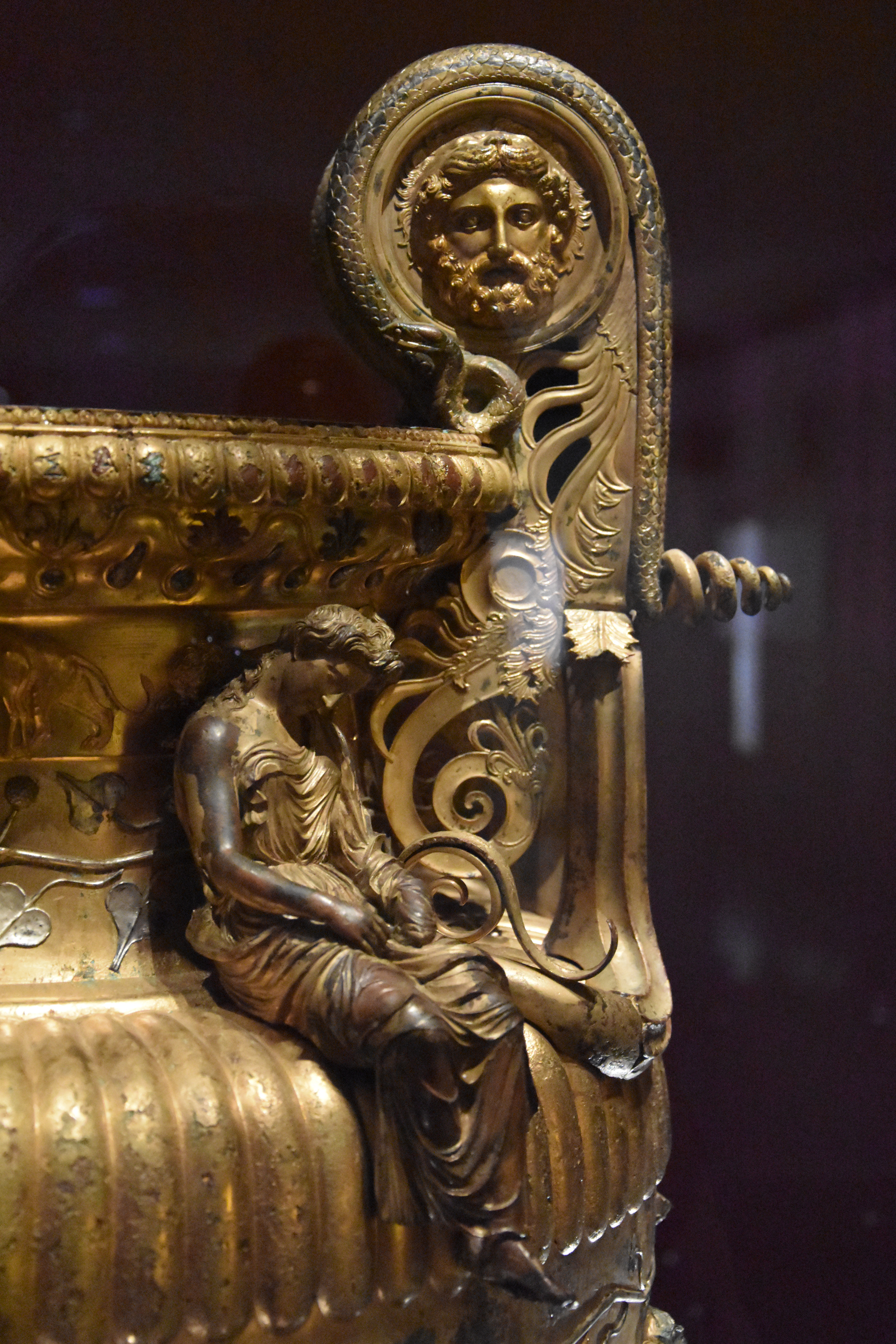
Ancient Greek medallion on a handle of the Derveni Krater, c. 370 BC, bronze and silver.

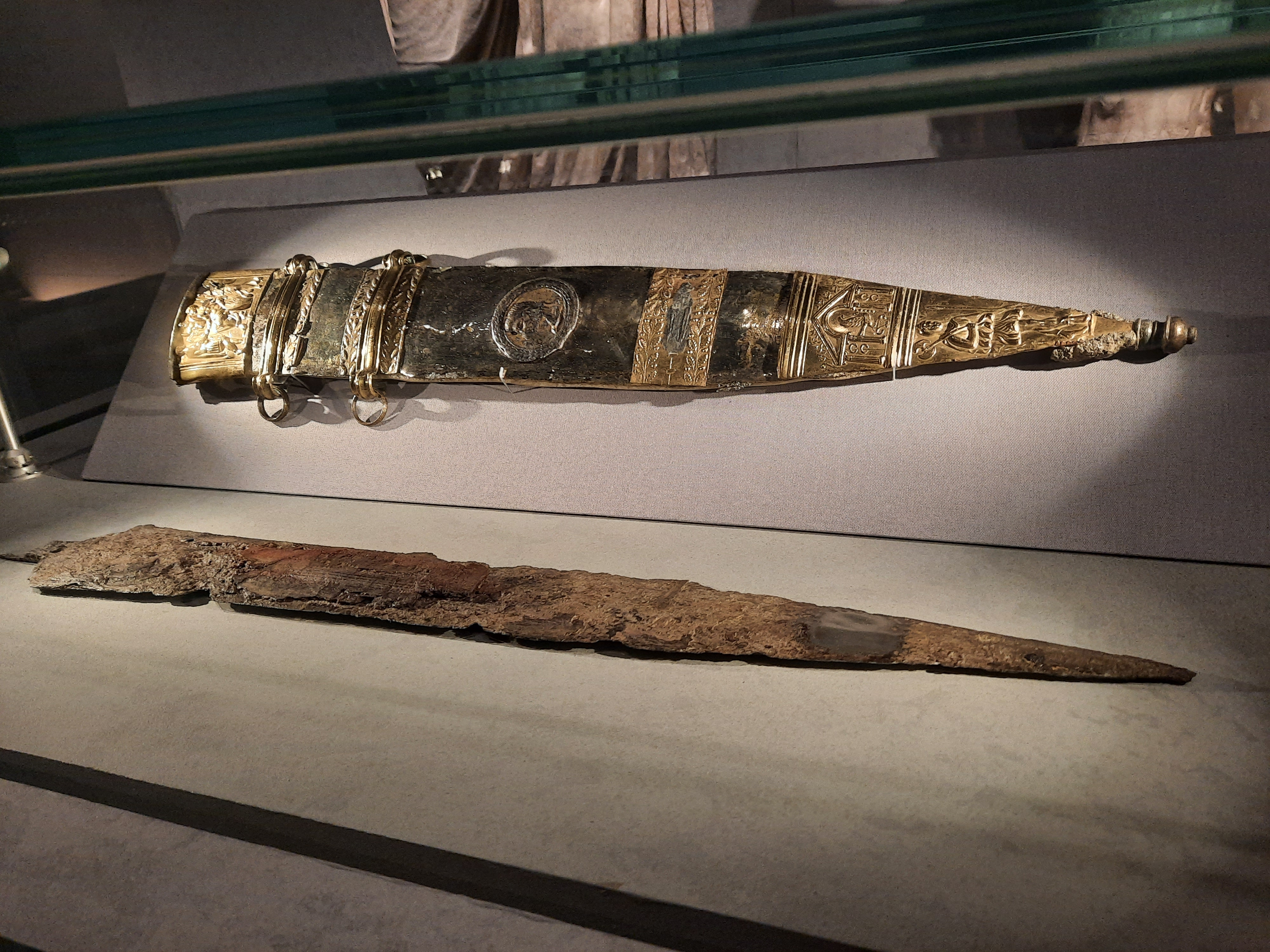
Roman medallion on the scabbard of the Sword of Tiberius, c. 15 AD, gilded bronze, British Museum

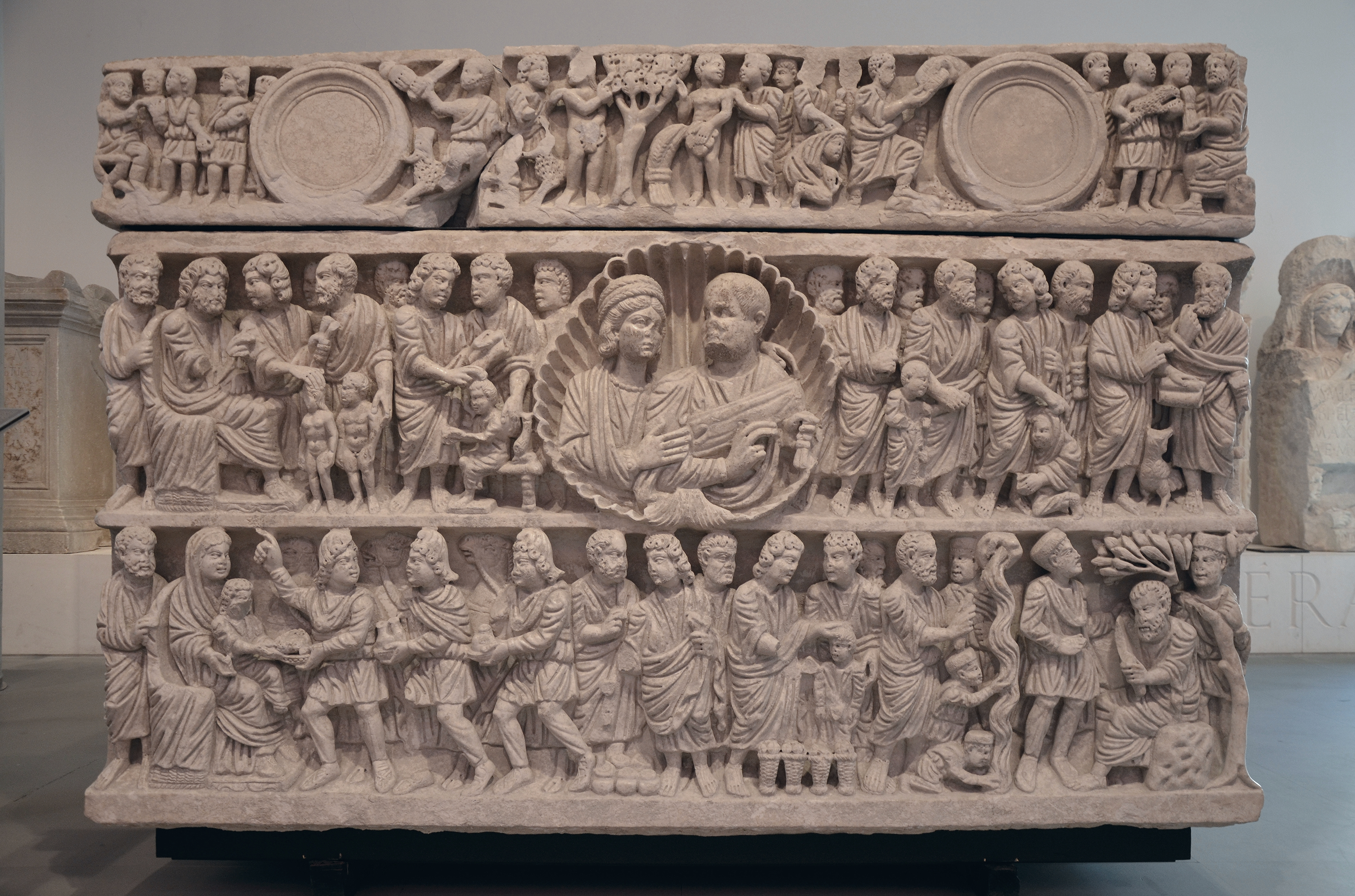
Roman shell-shaped medallion on a sarcophagus of a married couple, early 4th century, marble, Musée de l'Arles antique, Arles, France

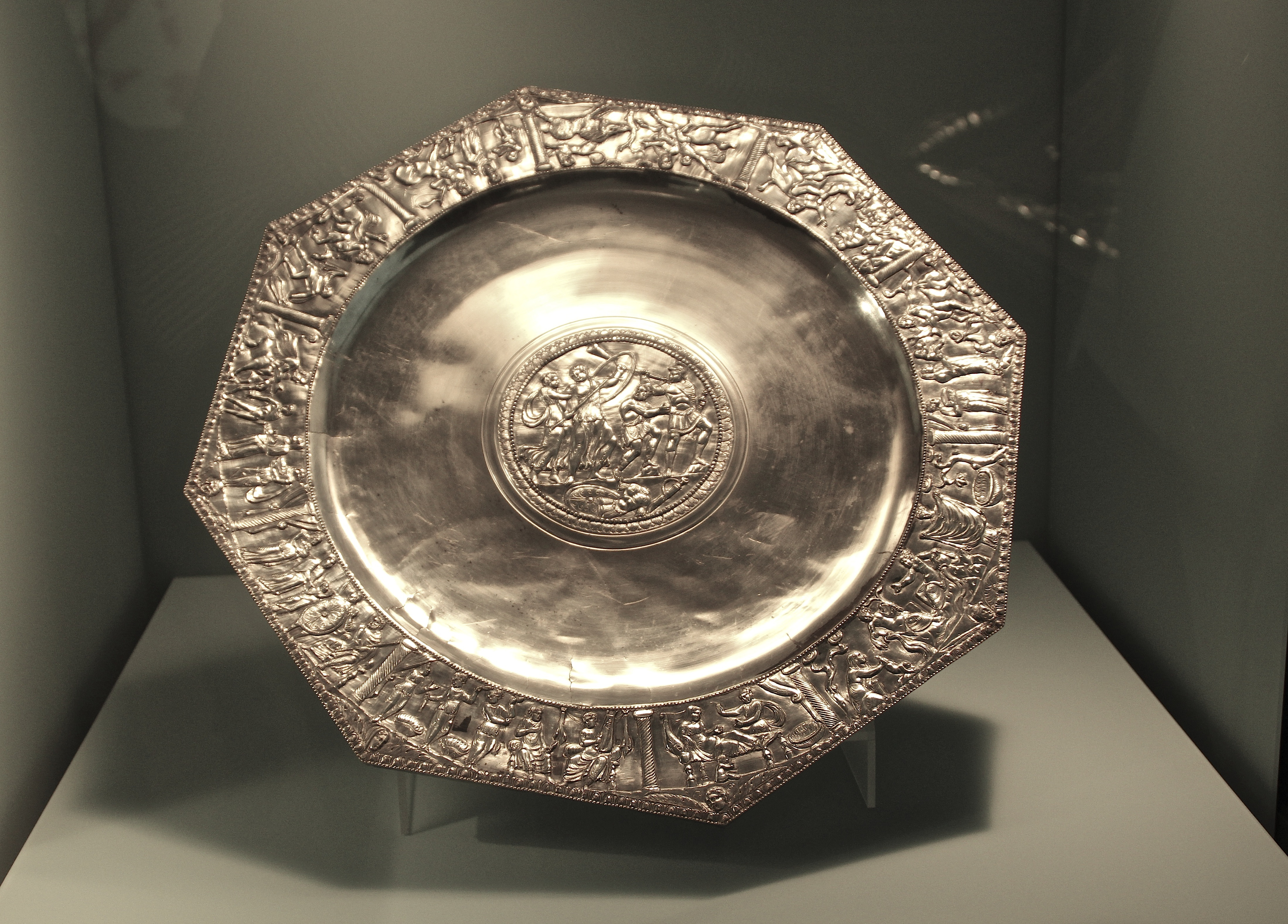
Roman medallion on a plate from the silver treasure of Augusta Raurica, mid 4th century, silver, Augusta Raurica Museum, near Augusta Raurica, Switzerland

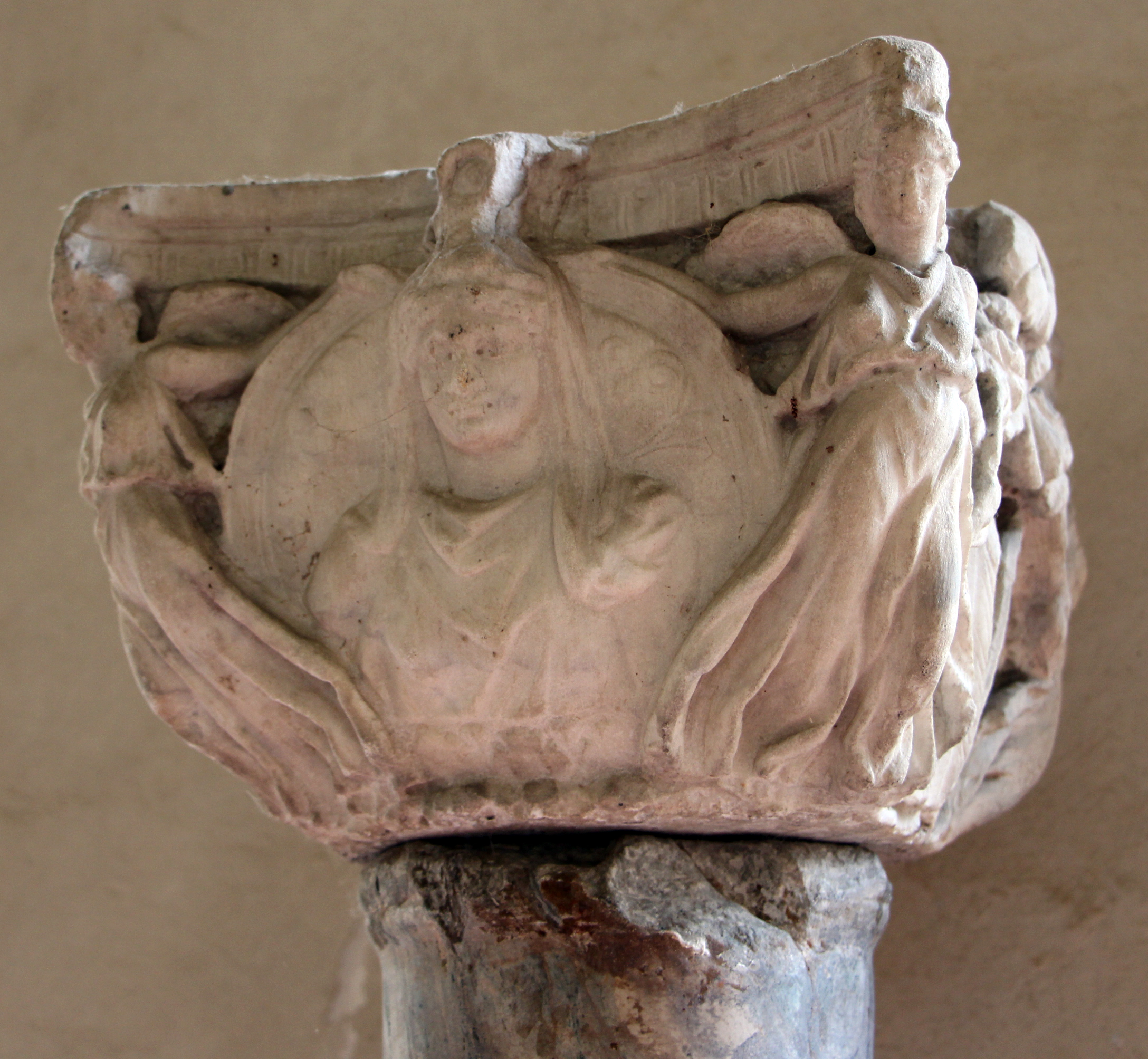
Roman medallion on a capital, unknown date, stone, Cerreto Guidi, Italy

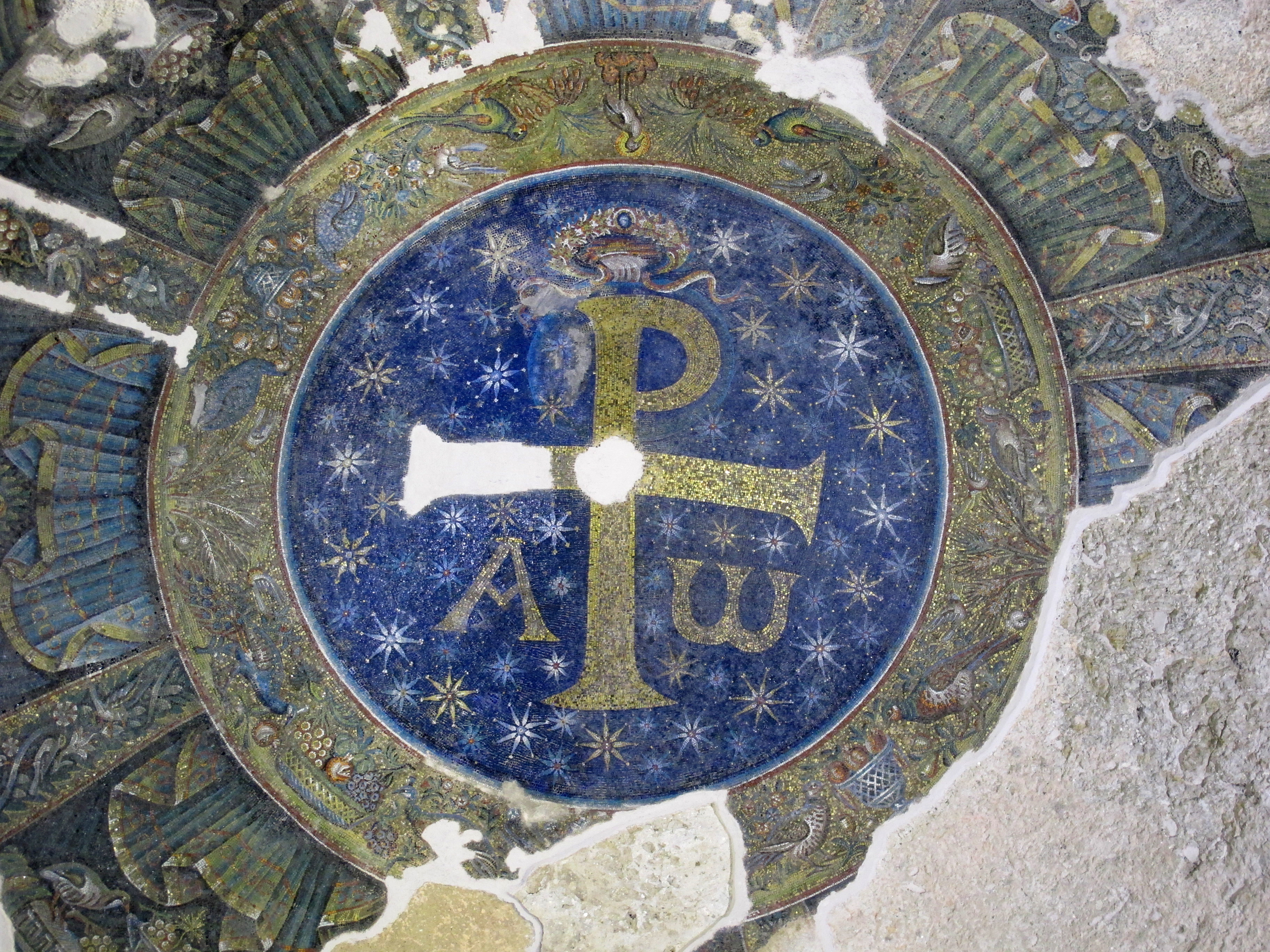
Byzantine mosaic medallion with the Chi Rho on the ceiling of Baptistery of San Giovanni in Fonte, Naples, Italy, unknown architect or craftsman, 362–408

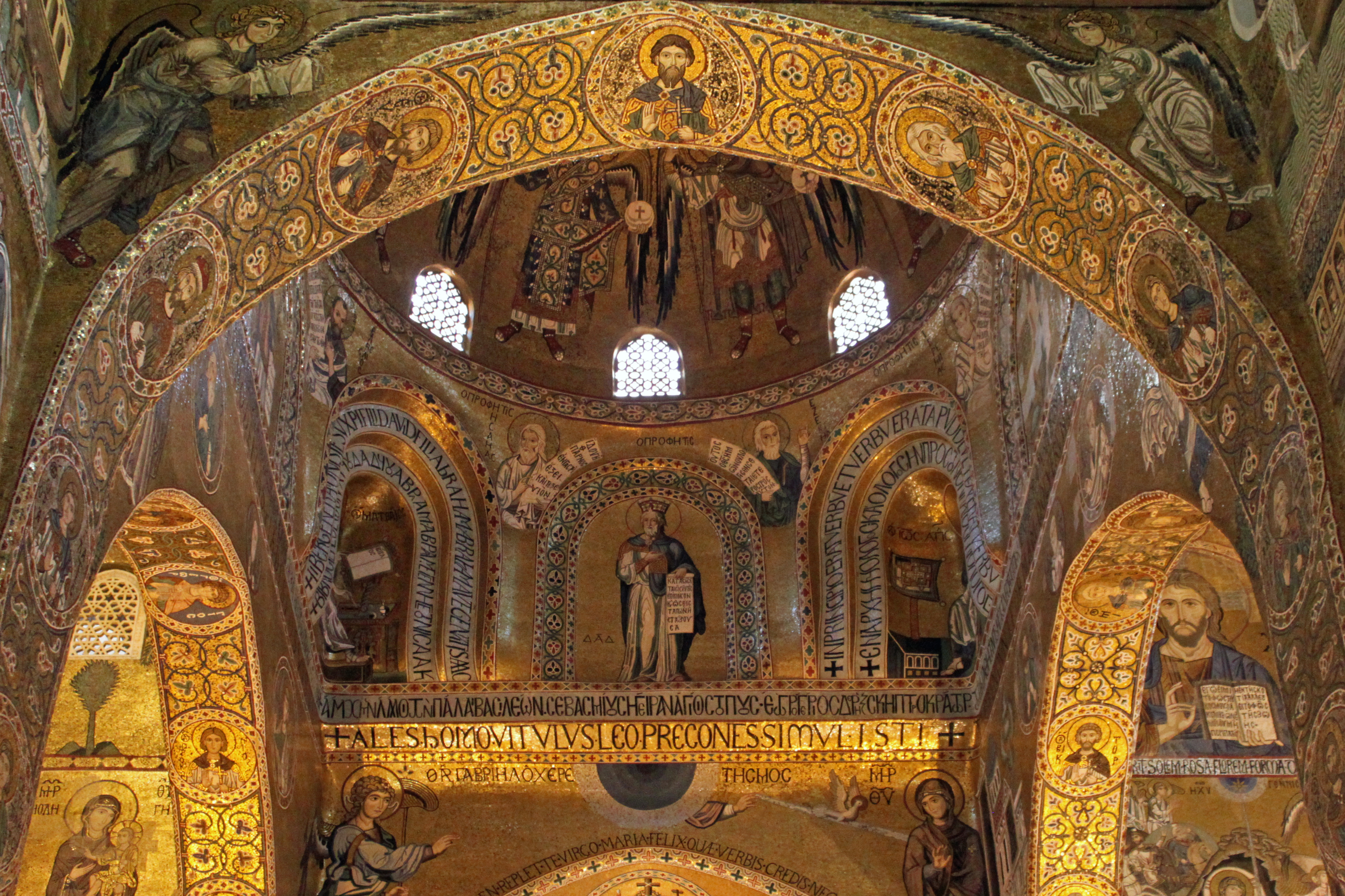
Byzantine mosaic medallions with rinceaux in the Cappella Palatina, Palermo, Italy, unknown architect or craftsman, 1140s

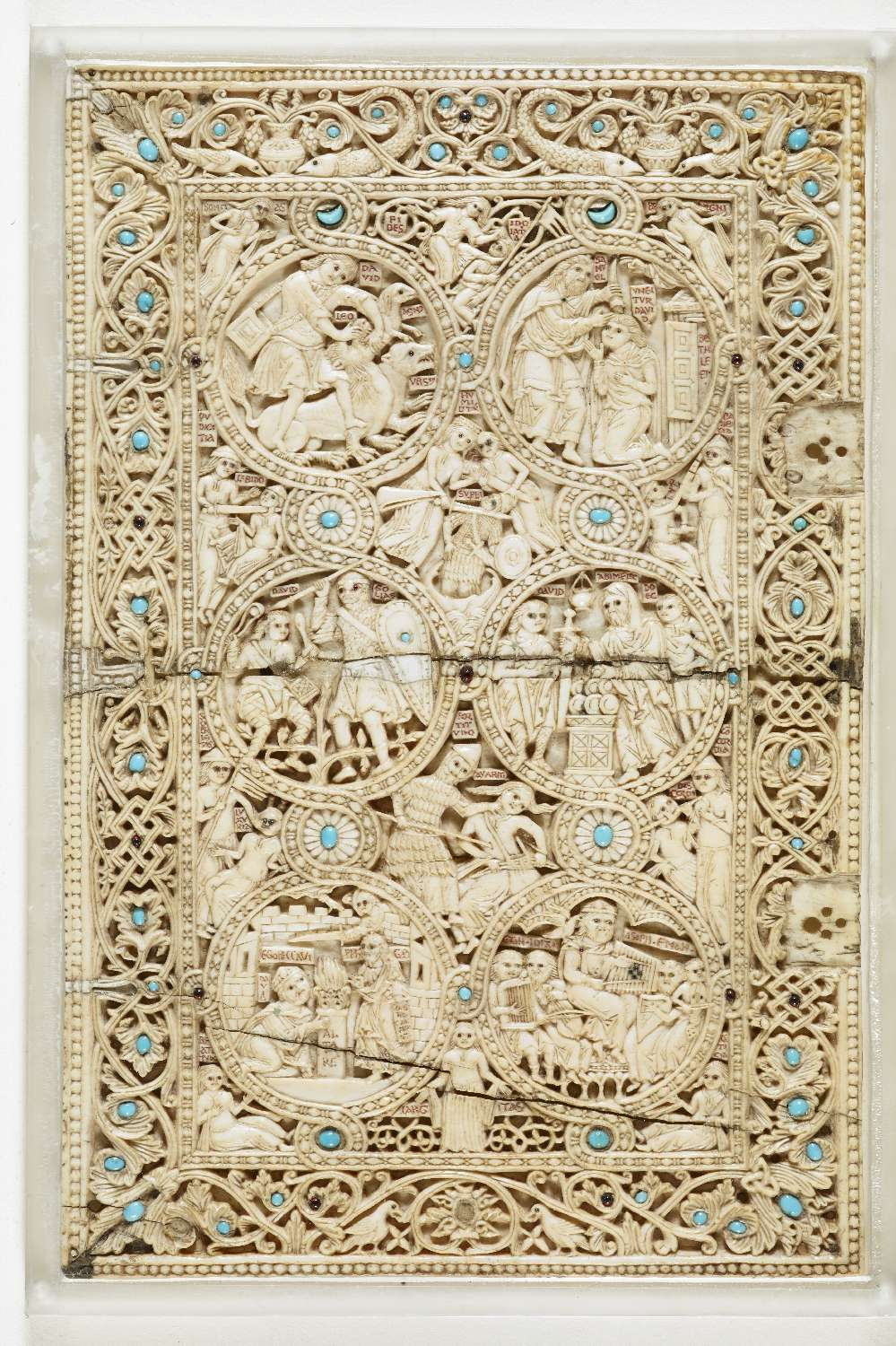
Byzantine medallions on the cover of the Melisende Psalter: Works of Mercy, 1131–1143, ivory, British Library, London

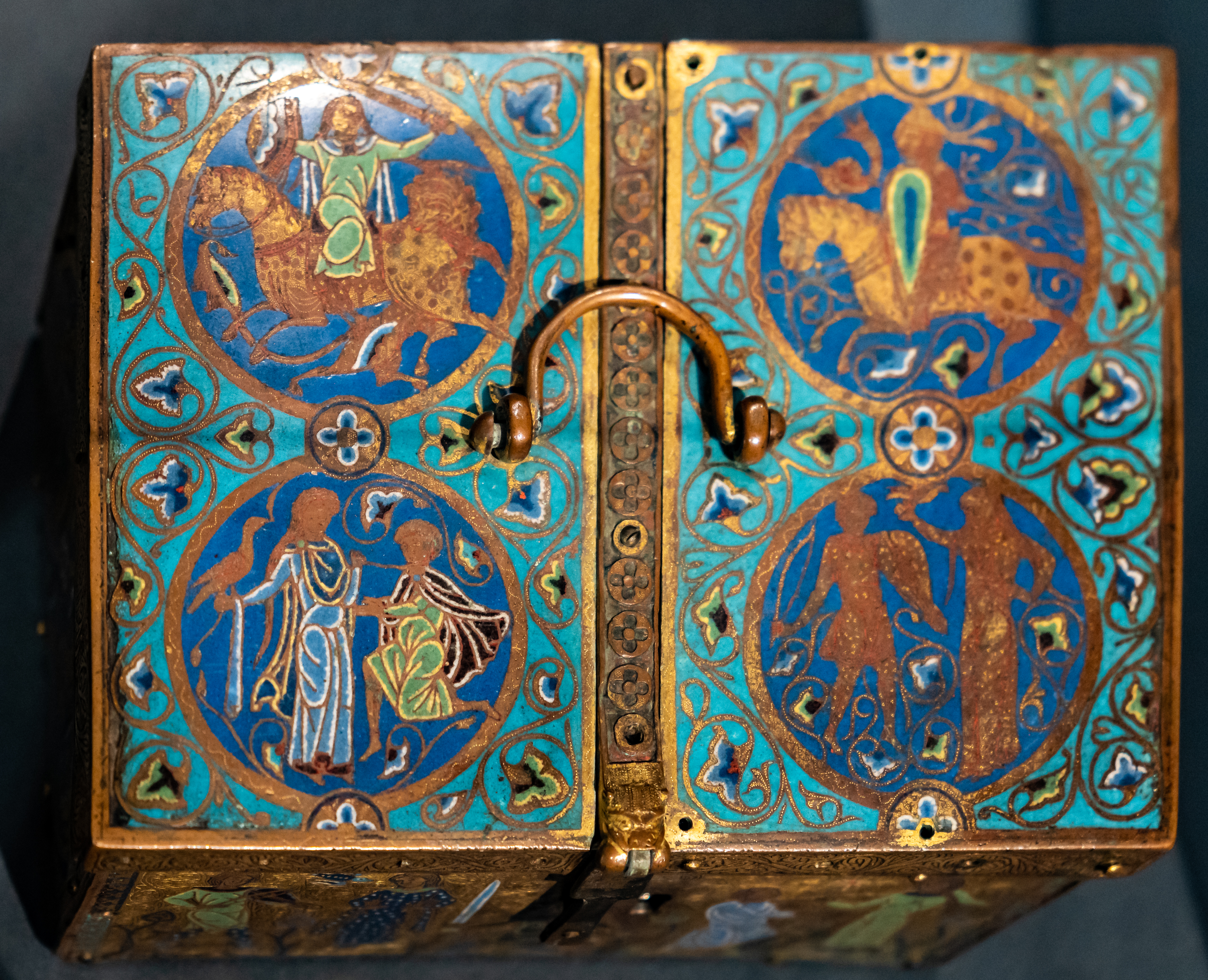
Romanesque medallions on the lid of a casket of courtly love, c.1180, champlevé enamel om gilded copper, British Museum, London

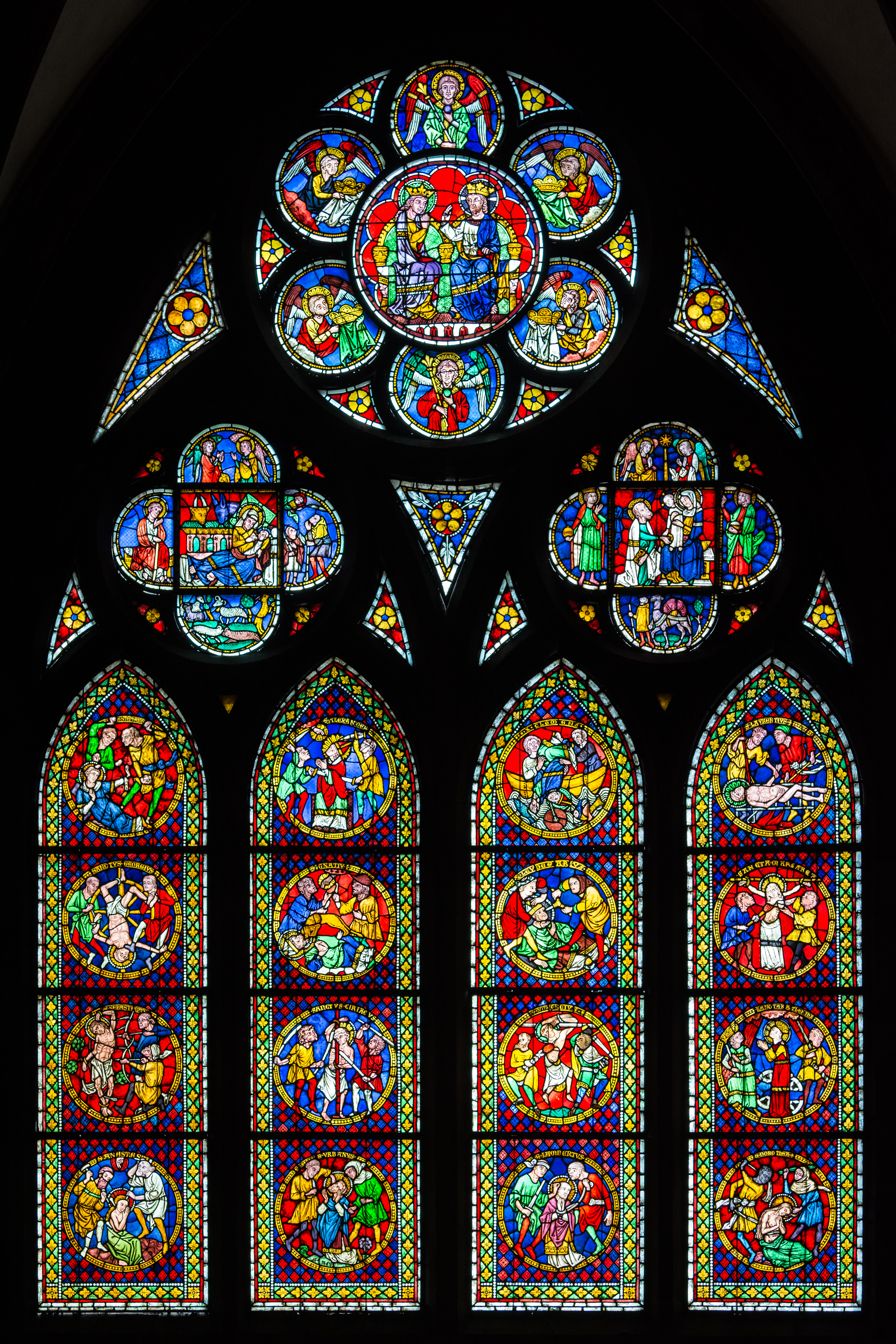
Gothic stained glass medallions of the Martyrs' Window in the Freiburg Minster, Freiburg im Breisgau, Germany, anonymous master, c.1270–80, complemented by Fritz Geiges in c.1922

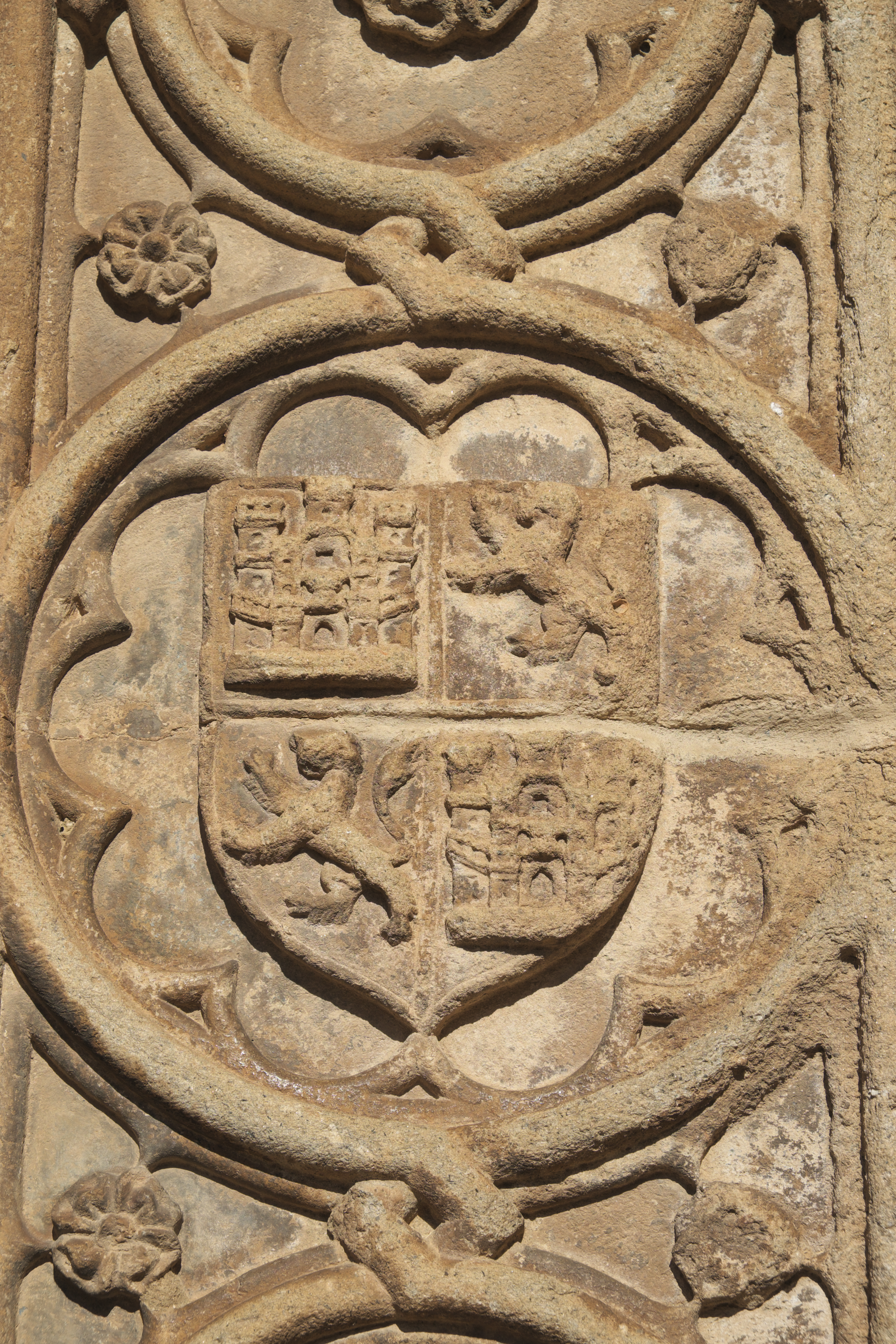
Gothic relief on the Monastery of Saint Mary of Guadalupe, Spain, unknown architect, unknown date

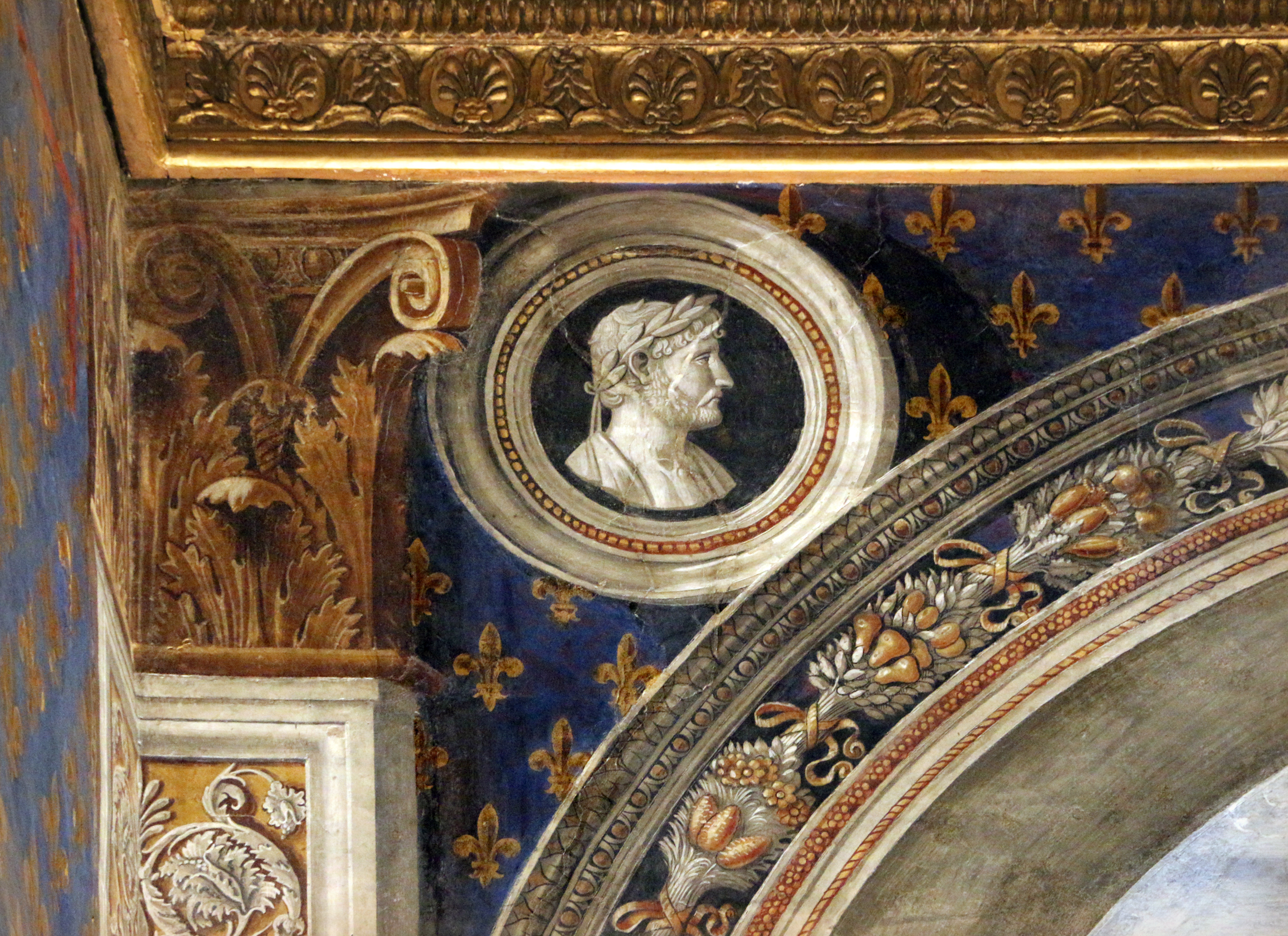
Renaissance medallion, part of the Sala dei Gigli frescos, Palazzo Vecchio, Florence, Italy, by Domenico Ghirlandaio, 1482–1484

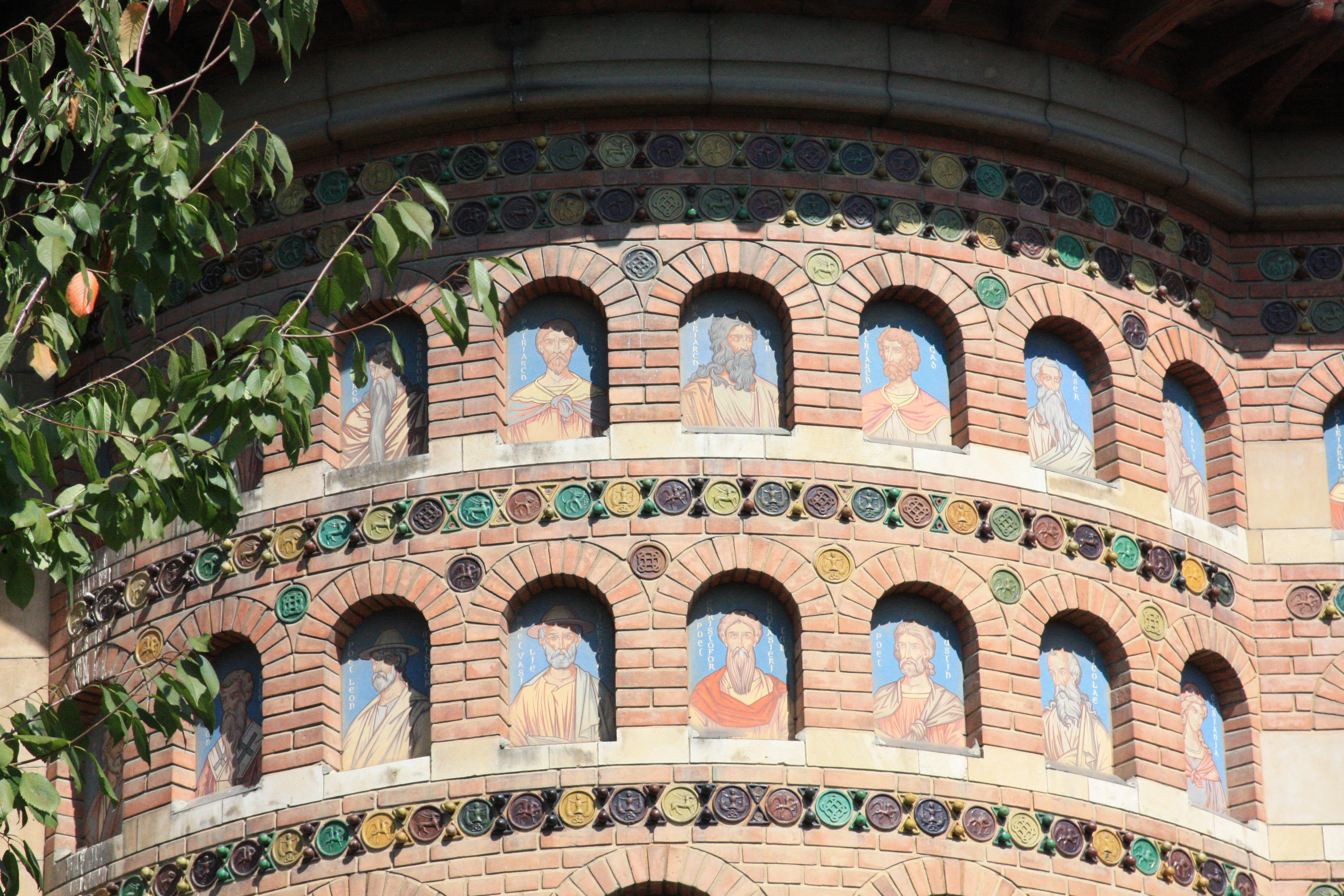
Moldavian style ceramic medallions on the facade of the Saint Nicholas Princely Church, Iași, Romania, originally 1485, restored in c.1888

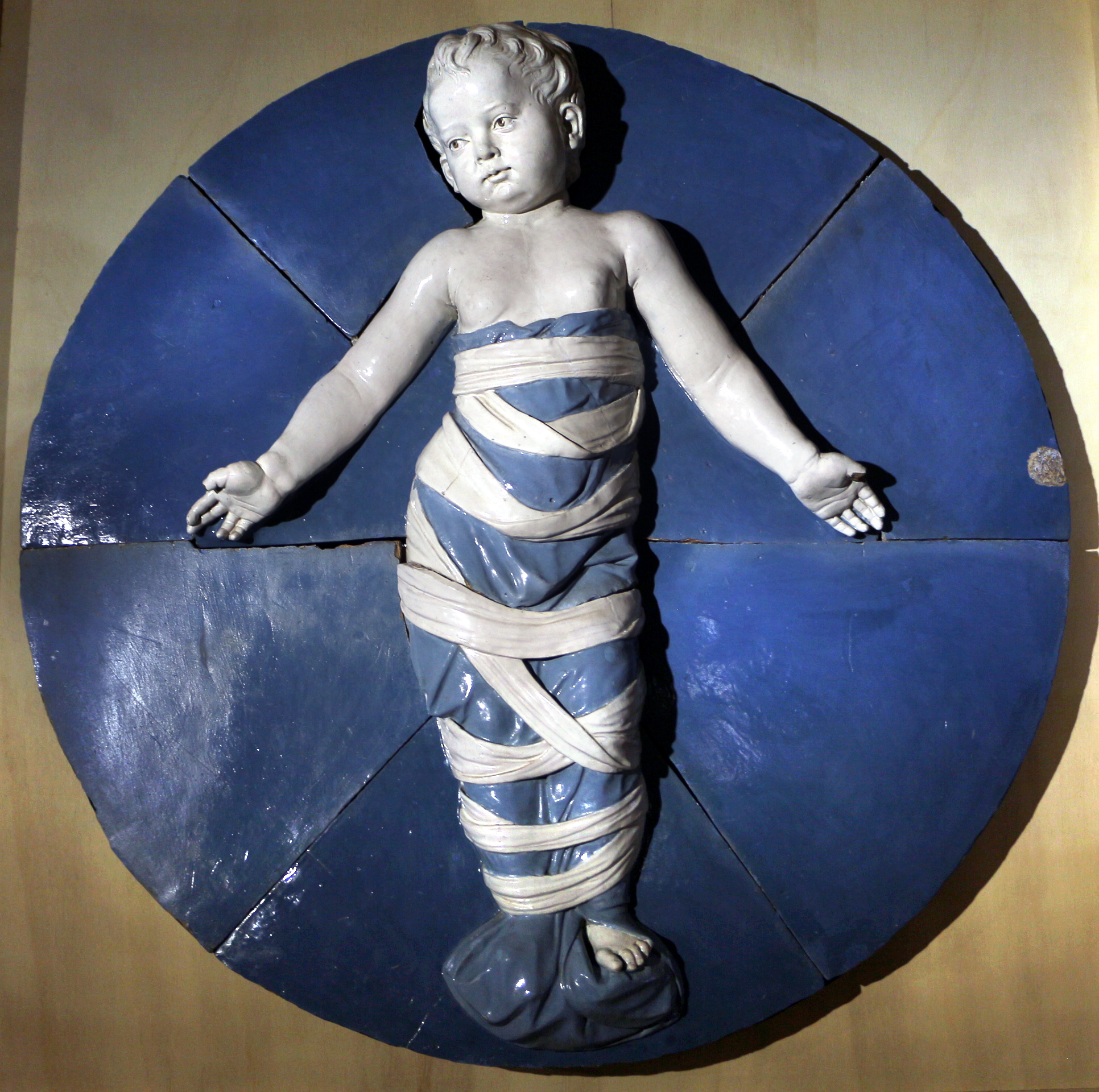
Renaissance medallion with a baby in swaddling clothes, by Andrea della Robbia, 1487, ceramic, initially above the portico of Ospedale degli Innocenti, now kept in the Museo degli Innocenti, Florence, Italy

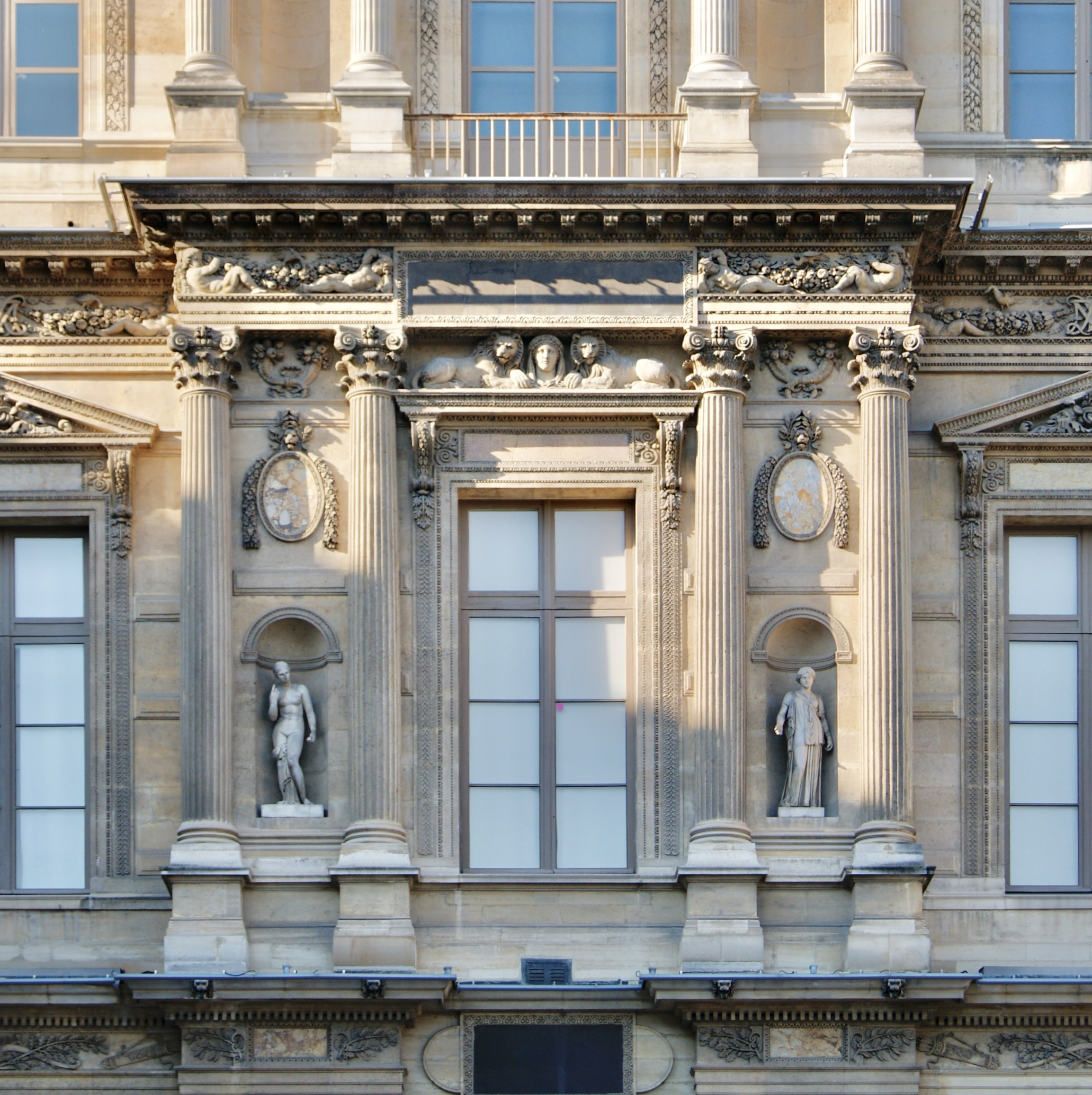
Renaissance medallion with marble plaques on the north facade of the Cour Carrée of the Louvre Palace, designed by Pierre Lescot, 16th century

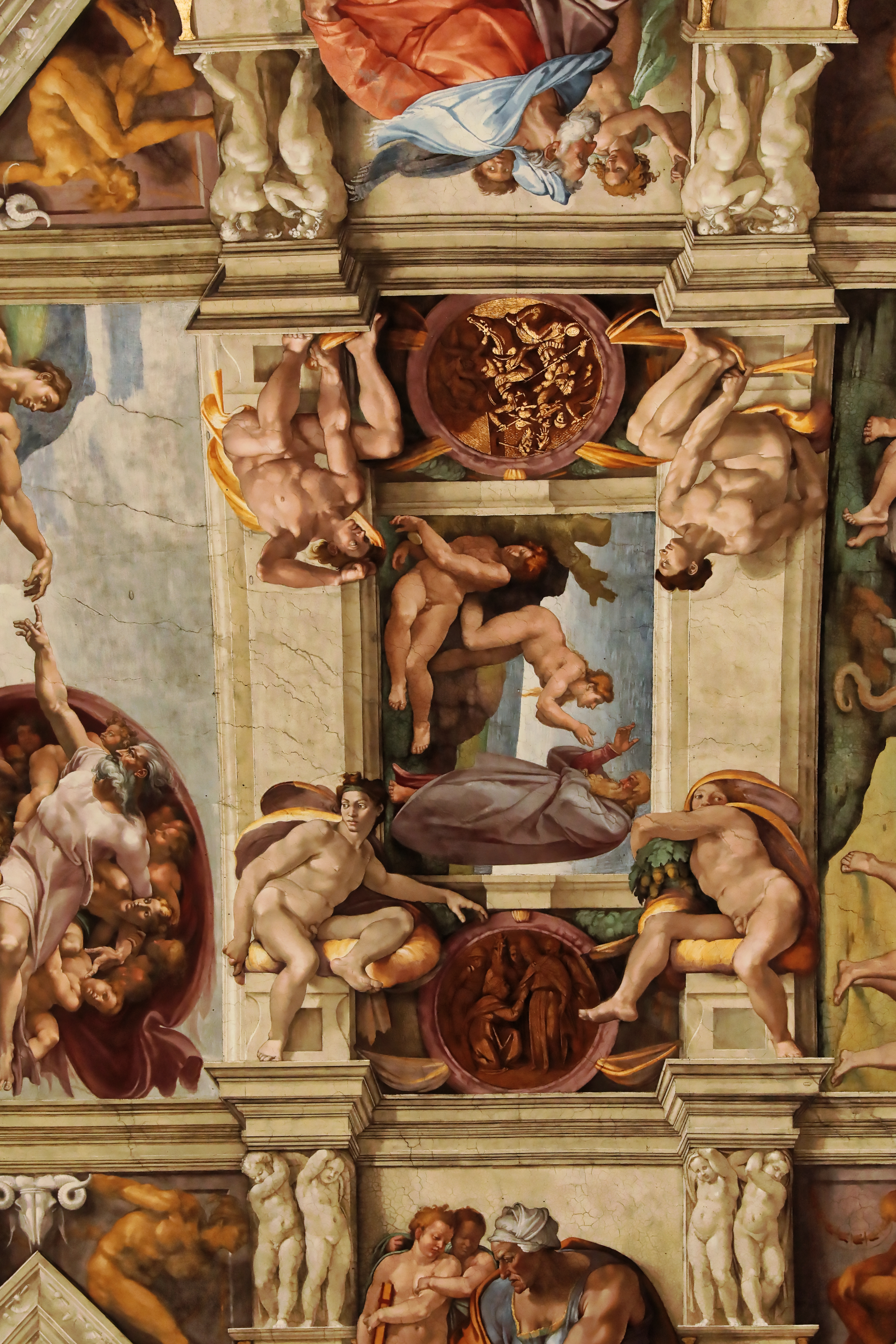
Renaissance medallions, by Michelangelo, 1509-1510, fresco, Sistine Chapel, Rome

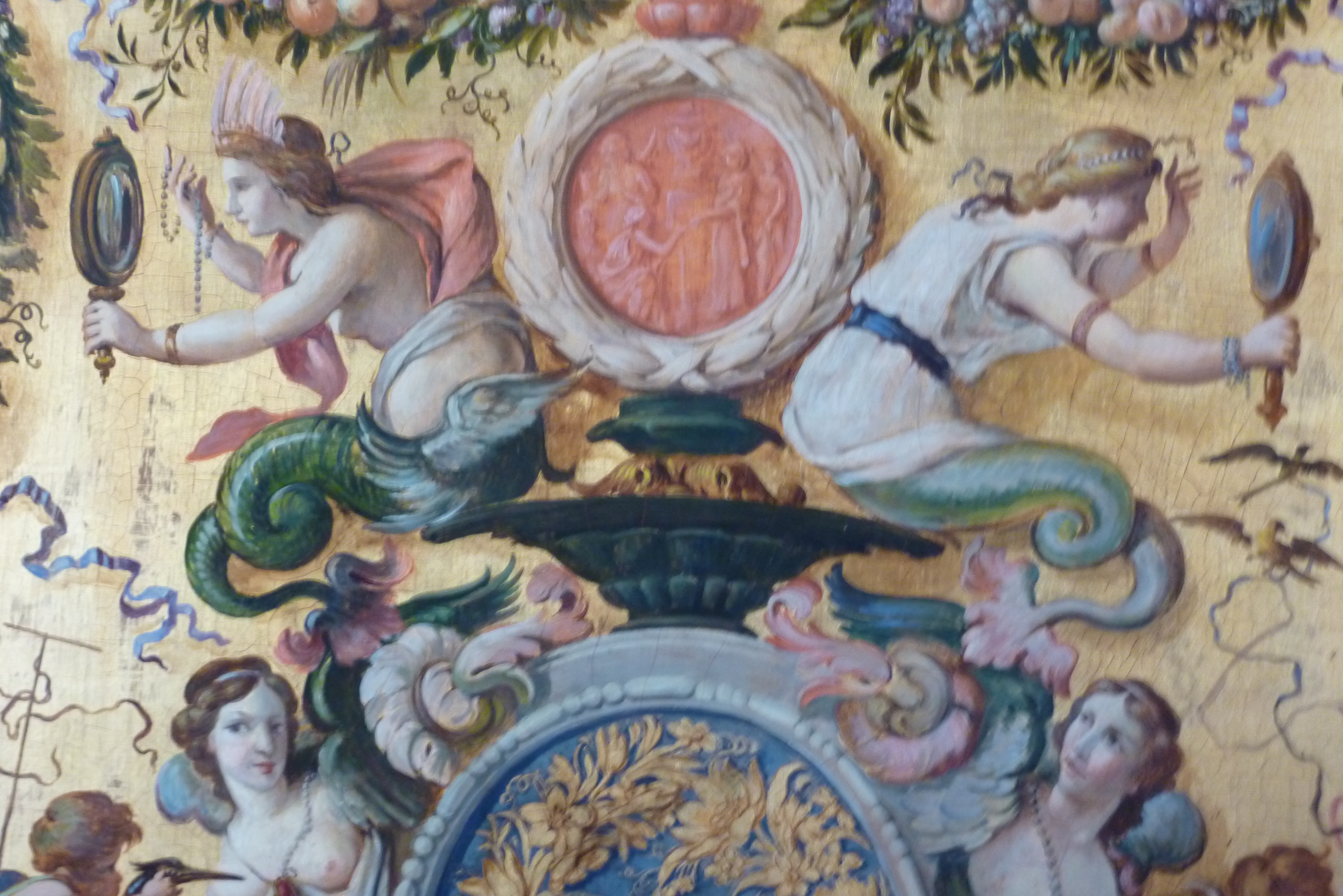
Louis XIII style medallion painted on some boiserie in the Bibliothèque de l'Arsenal, Paris, unknown architect and painter, c.1610–1643

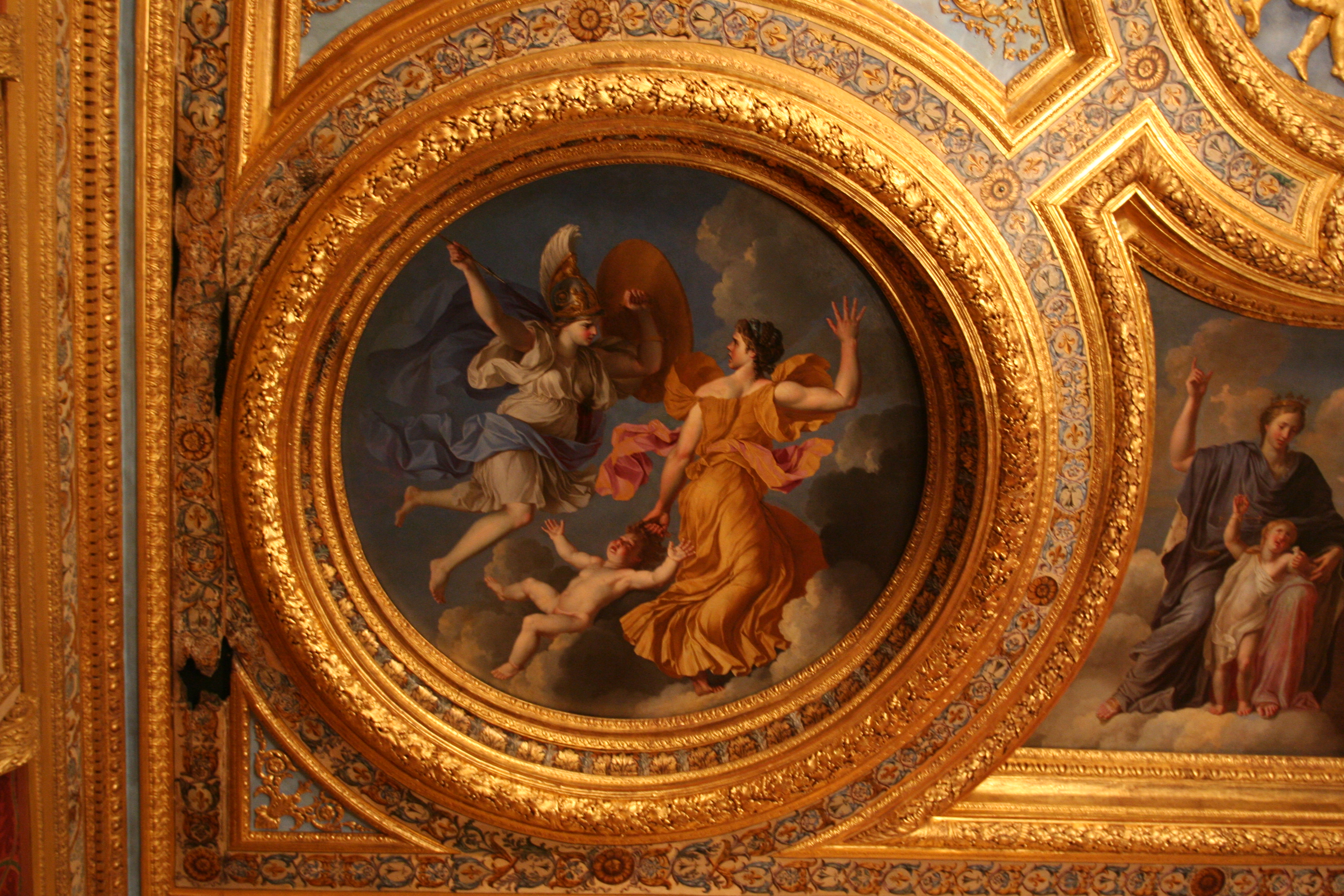
Wisdom casting out Calumny, Baroque painting by Noël Coypel, c. 1656–1666, Palais du Parlement de Bretagne, Rennes, France

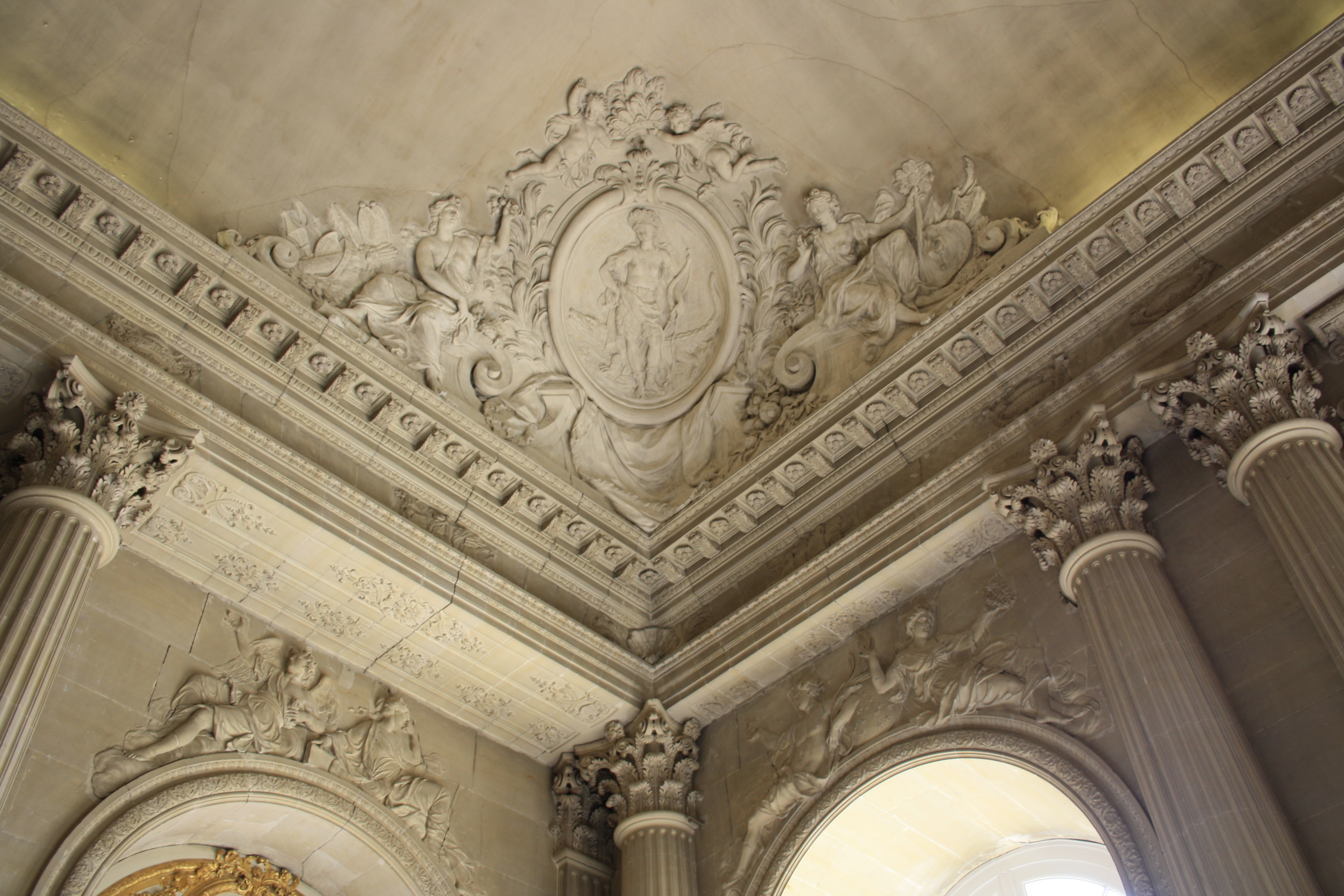
Baroque medallion on a ceiling in the high hall of the chapel of the Palace of Versailles, Versailles, France, unknown architect or sculptor, 17th century

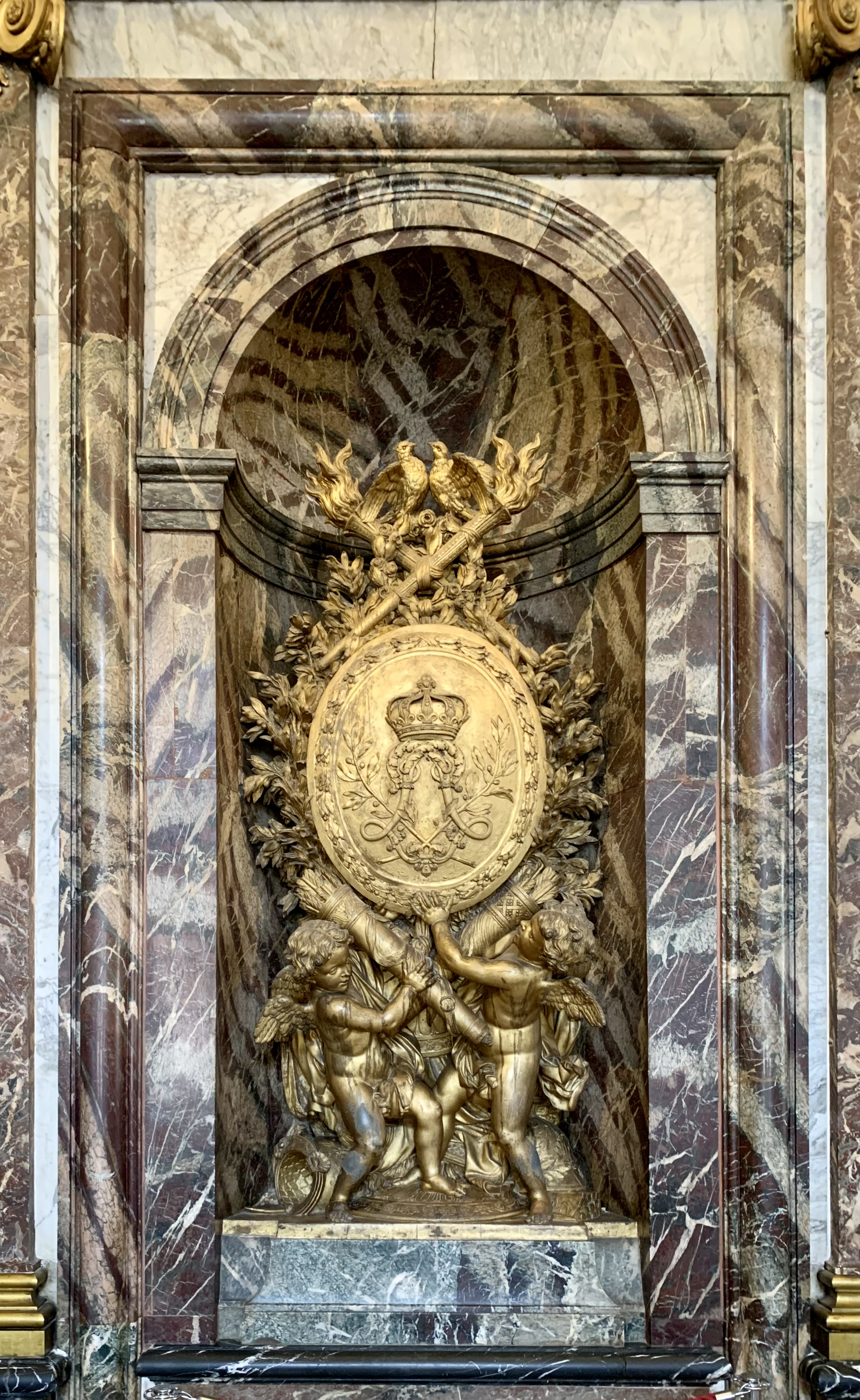
Baroque sculpture of cherubs holding a medallion with Louis XIV's monogram, unknown sculptor, late 17th-very early 18th century, Palace of Versailles, Versailles, France

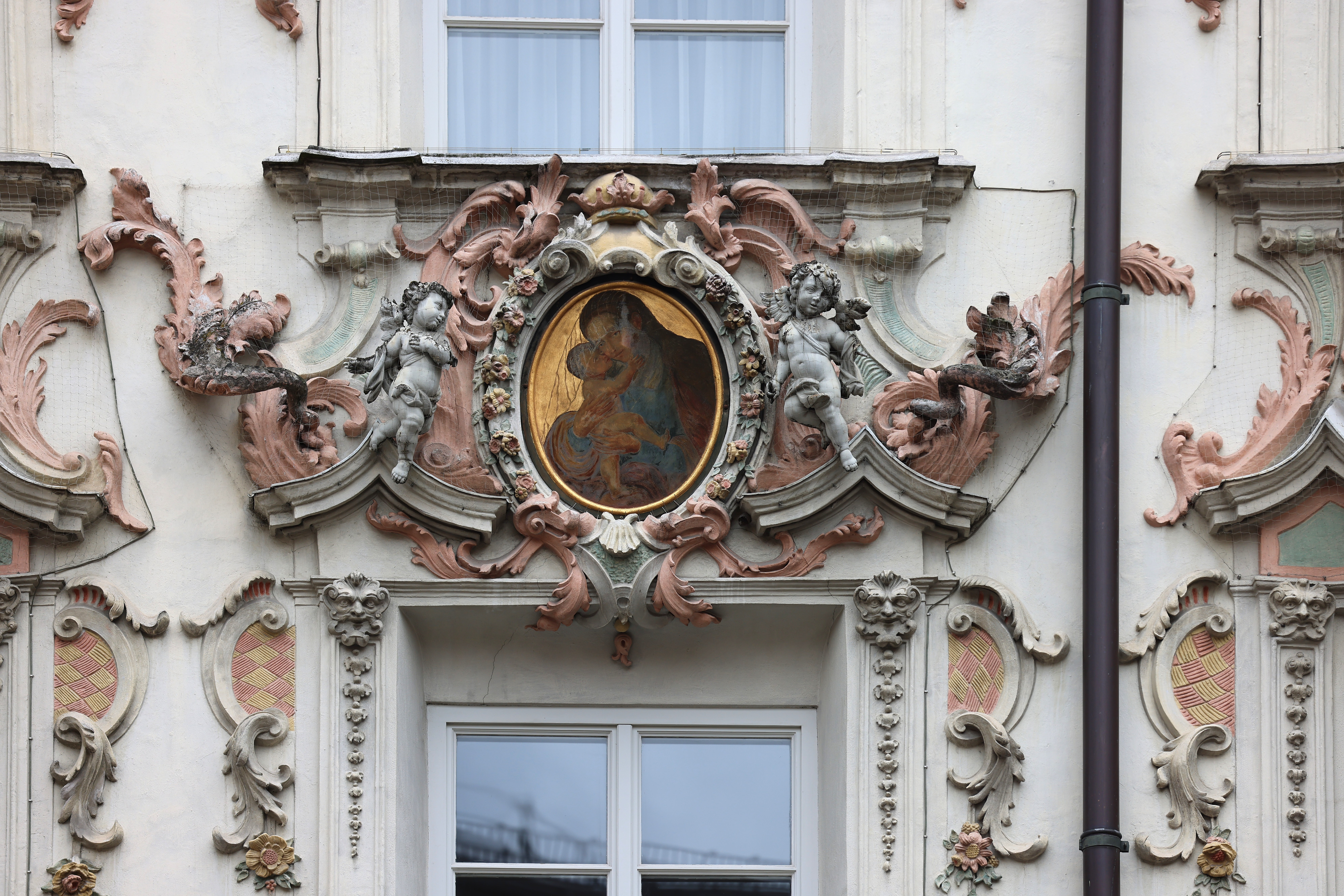
Rococo medallion of the Helbling House, Innsbruck, Austria, by Anton Gigl, 1732

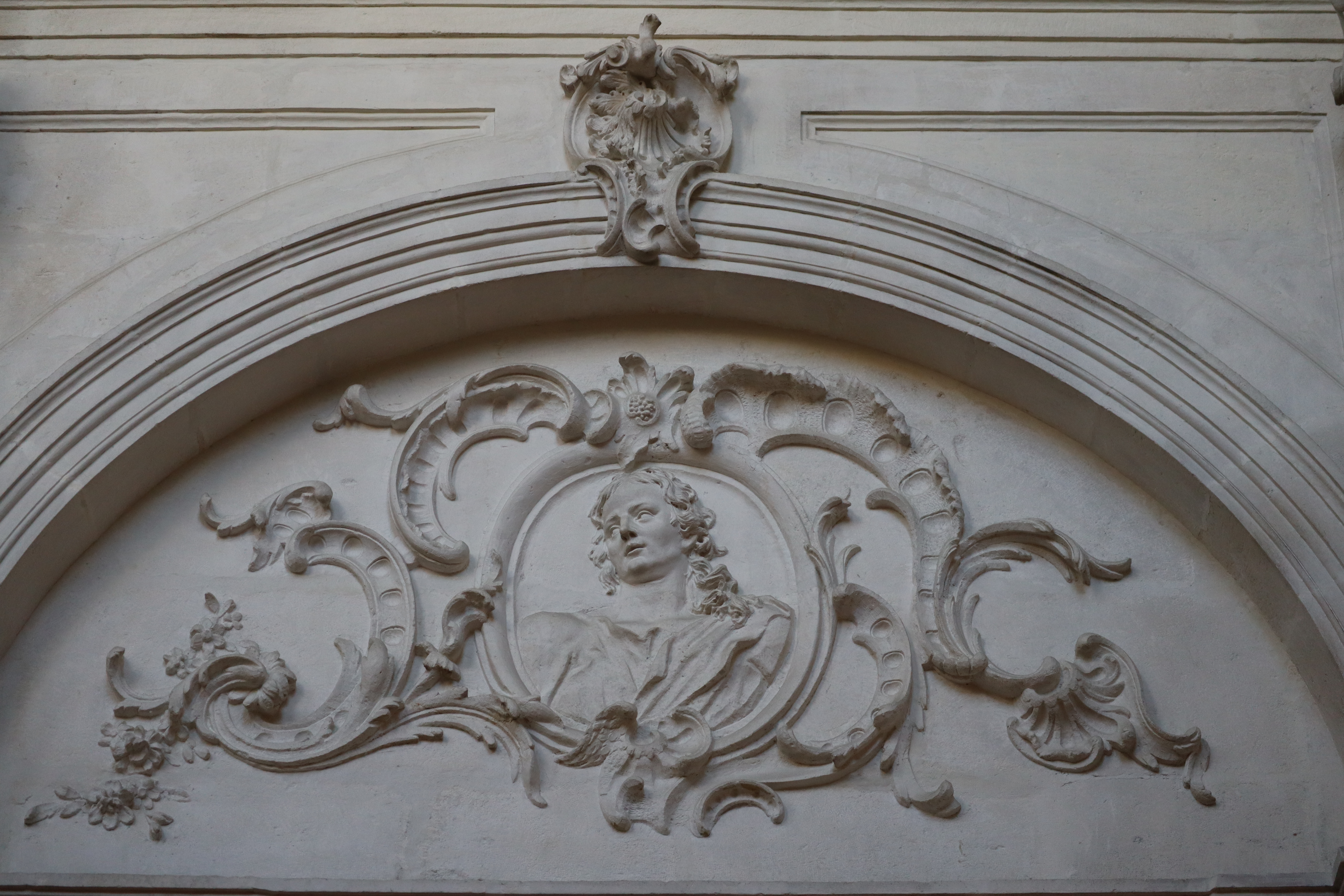
Rococo medallion in the Chapelle des Élus, Dijon, France, designed by Jacques Gabriel, 1738–1739

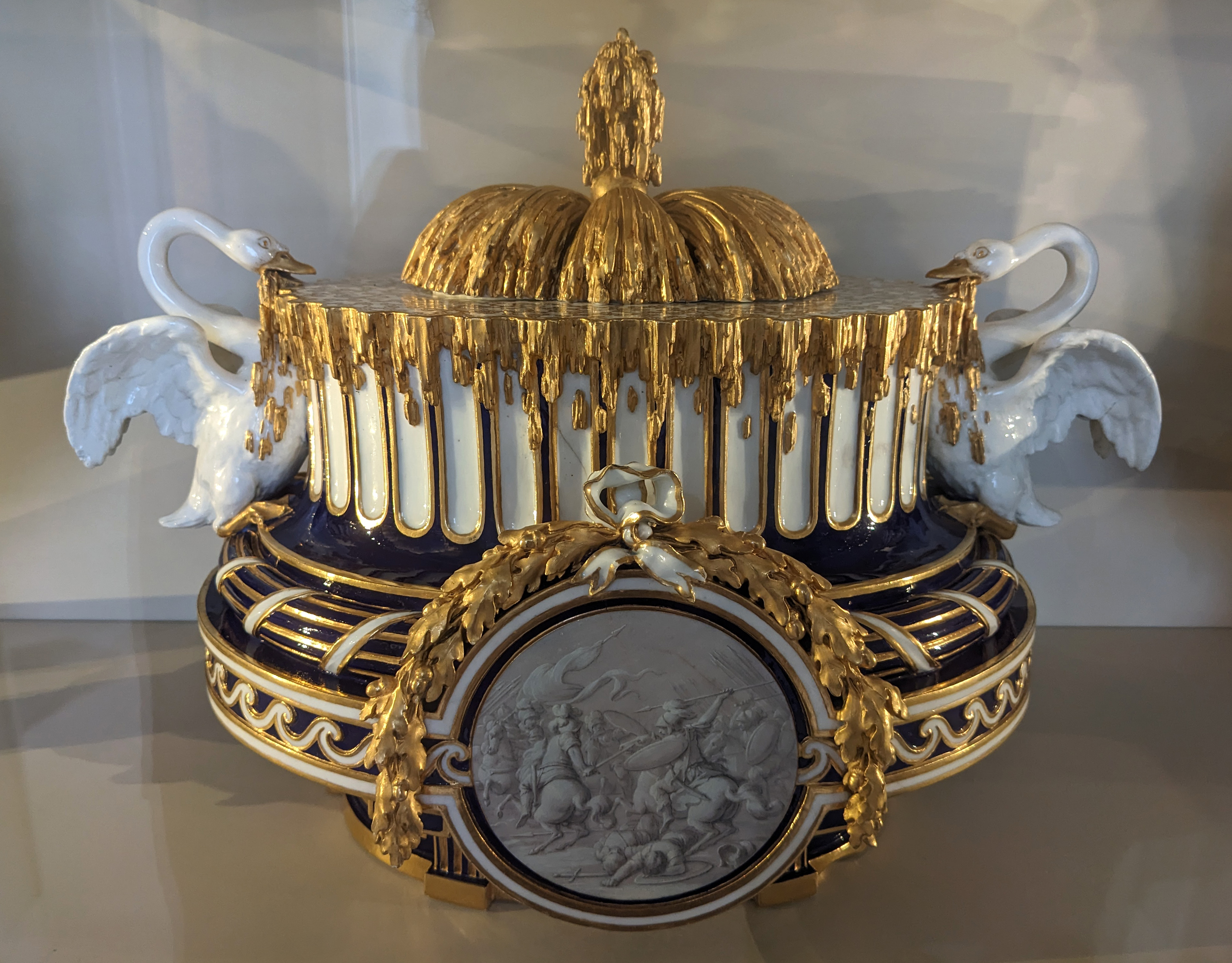
Louis XVI style vase with a medallion with garlands at the top, swans and Vitruvian scrolls, by Jean-Baptiste-Étienne Genest for Sèvres, c. 1767, soft-paste porcelain, Louvre

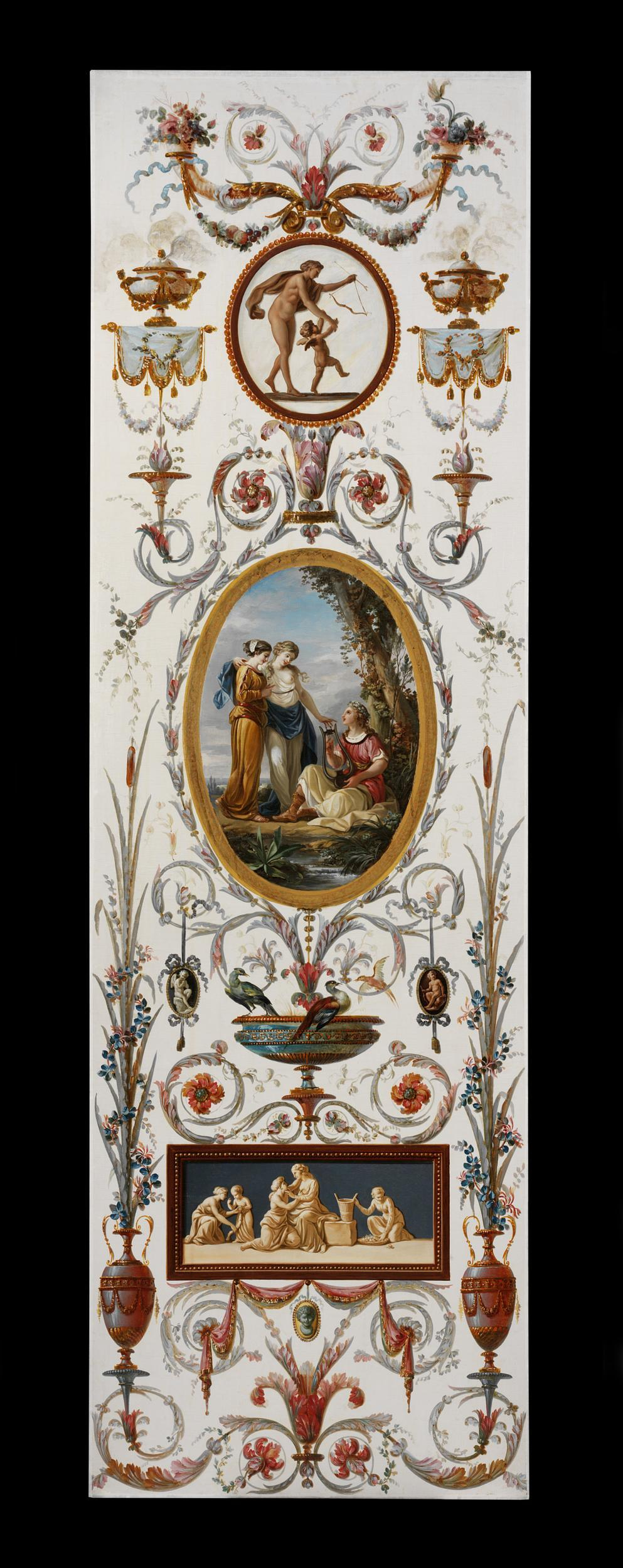
Louis XVI style medallion with garlands at the top, in a grotesque panel, originally from the Hôtel Grimod de La Reynière, Paris, designed and painted by Charles-Louis Clérissea, 1770s, Victoria and Albert Museum, London

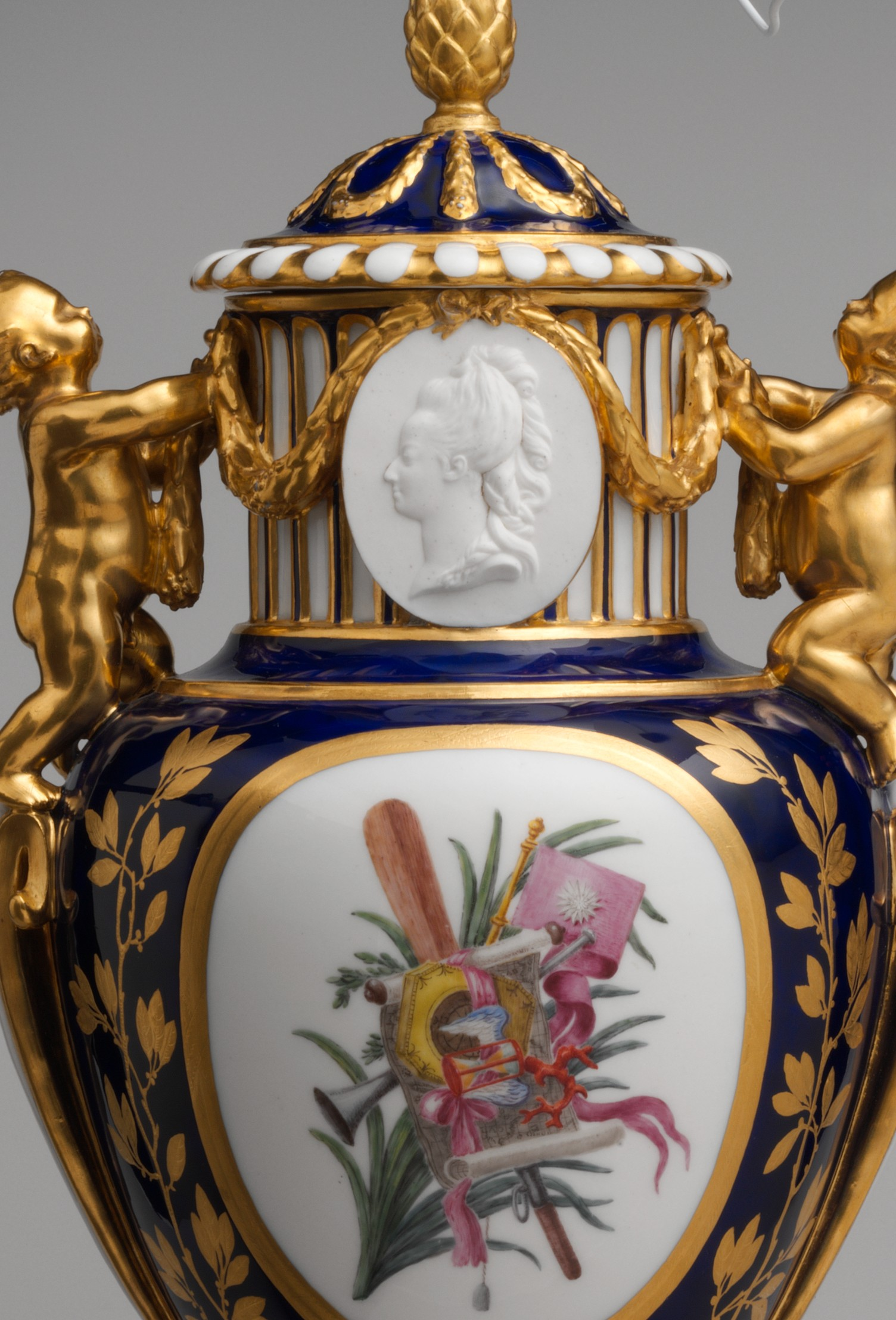
Louis XVI style medallion with garlands at the top, with a portrait relief on a vase with cover, Sèvres, c.1778, soft-paste porcelain, Metropolitan Museum of Art, New York

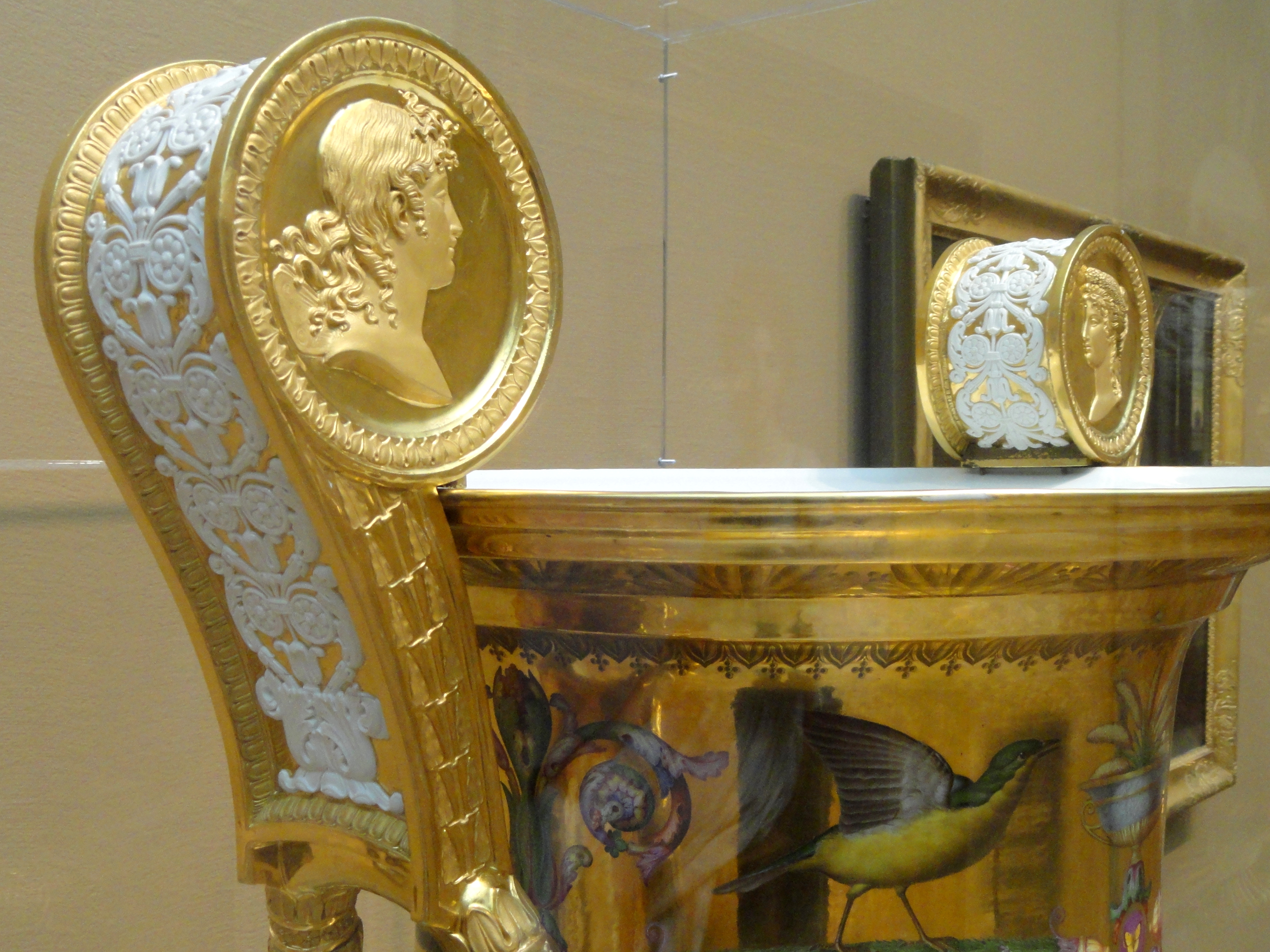
Neoclassical medallions on the handle of the Londonderry Vase, Sèvres porcelain, designed by Charles Percier, decoration designed by Alexandre-Theodore Brogniart, flowers and ornament painted by Gilbert Drouet, and birds painted by Christophe-Ferdinand Caron, 1813, hard-paste porcelain, polychrome enamels, gilding, and gilt bronze mounts, Art Institute of Chicago, US

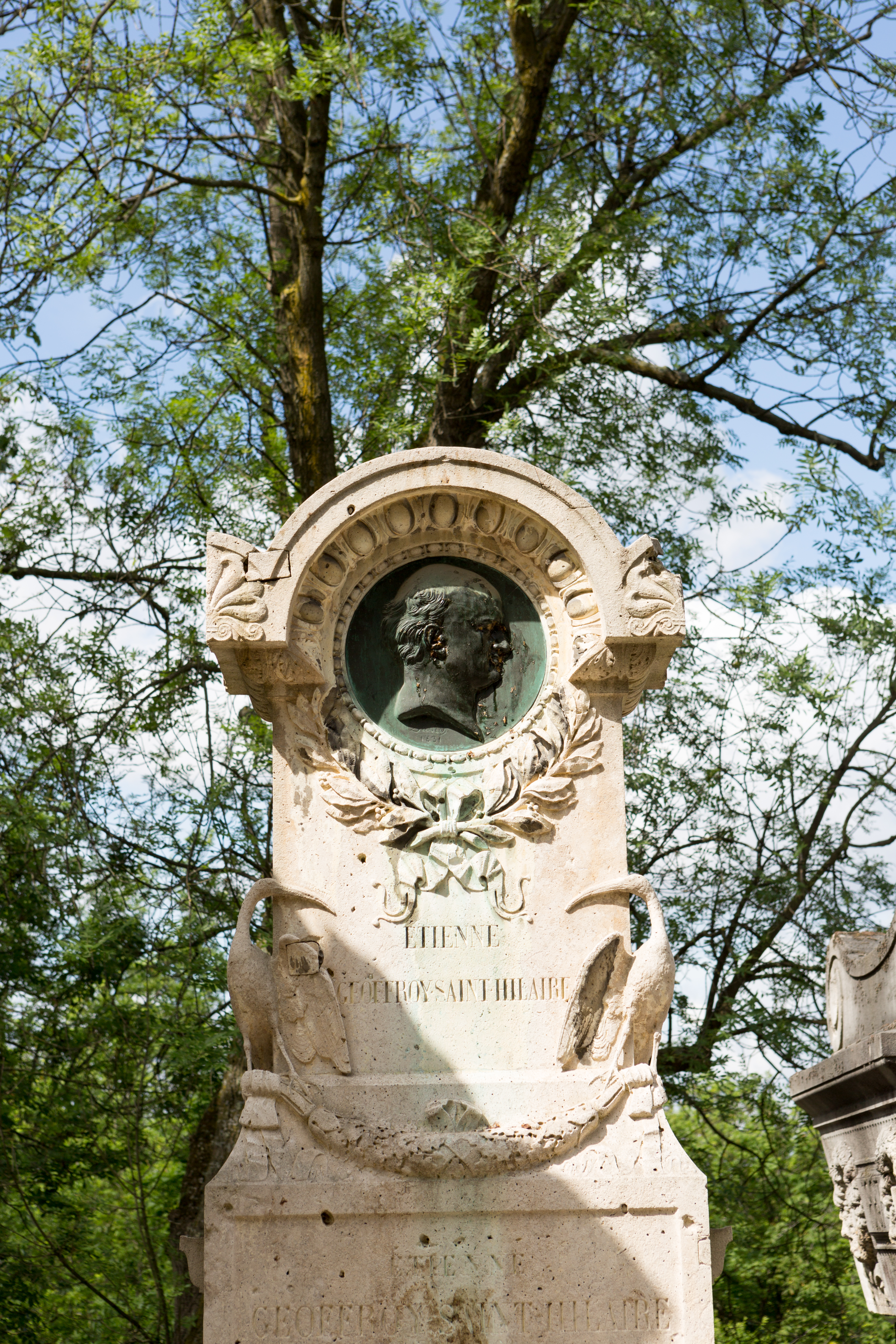
Neoclassical medallion on the Grave of Geoffroy Saint-Hilaire, Père Lachaise Cemetery, Paris, by David d'Angers, 1844

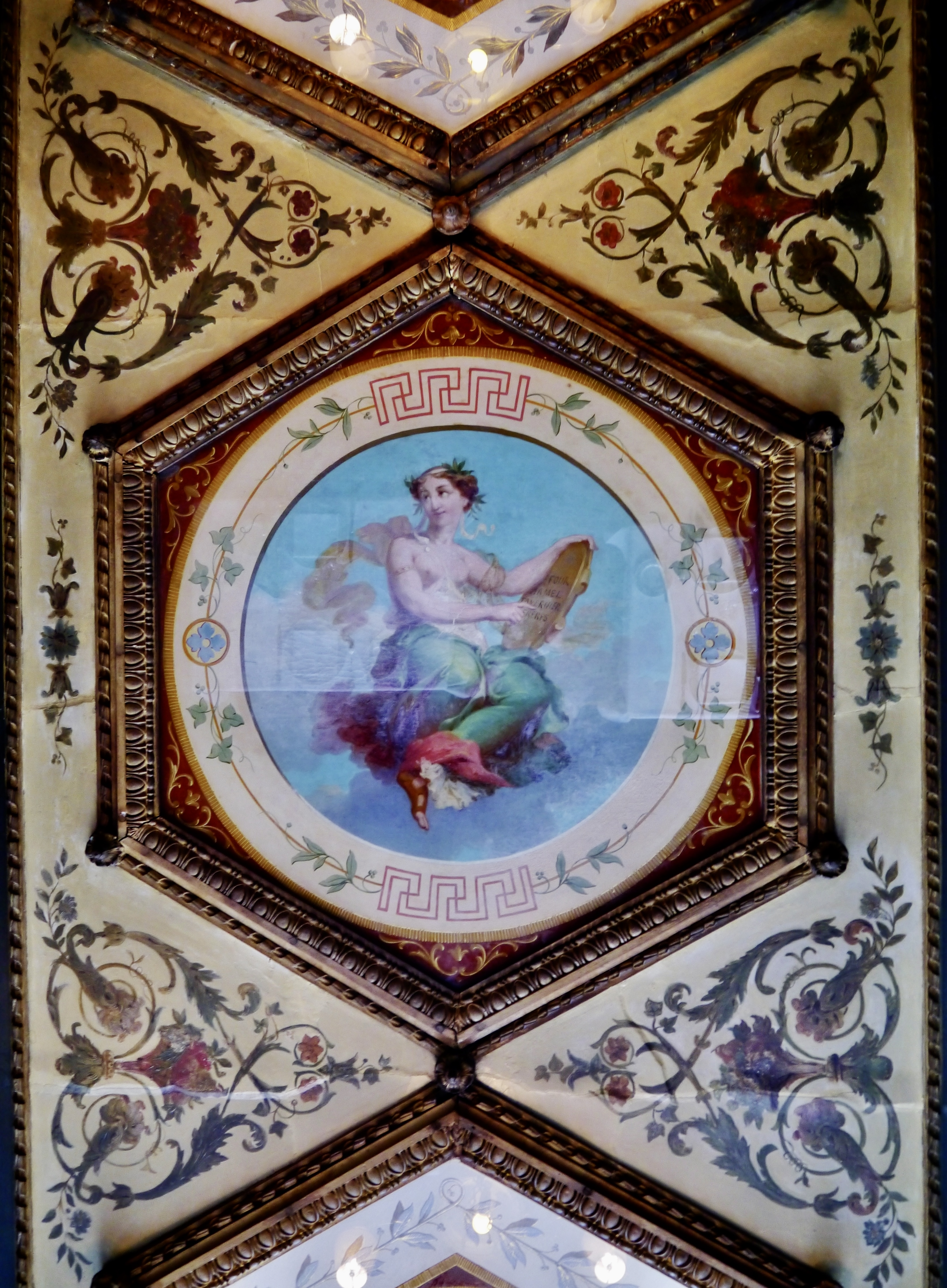
Neoclassical medallion in Le Grand Véfour, Paris, by M.L. Viguet, 1852

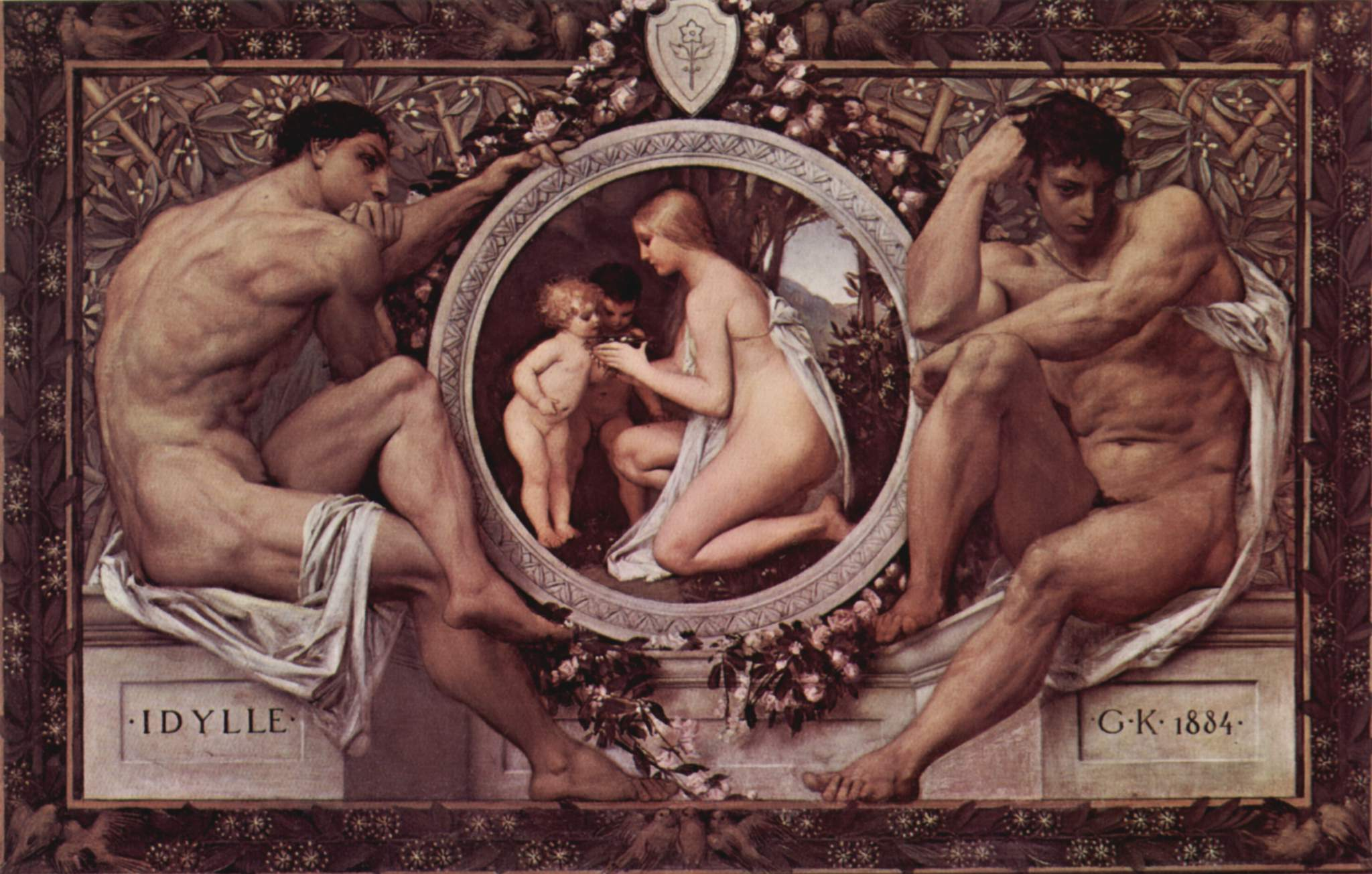
Allegory of Idyll, by Gustav Klimt, 1884, oil on canvas Wien Museum, Vienna, Austria

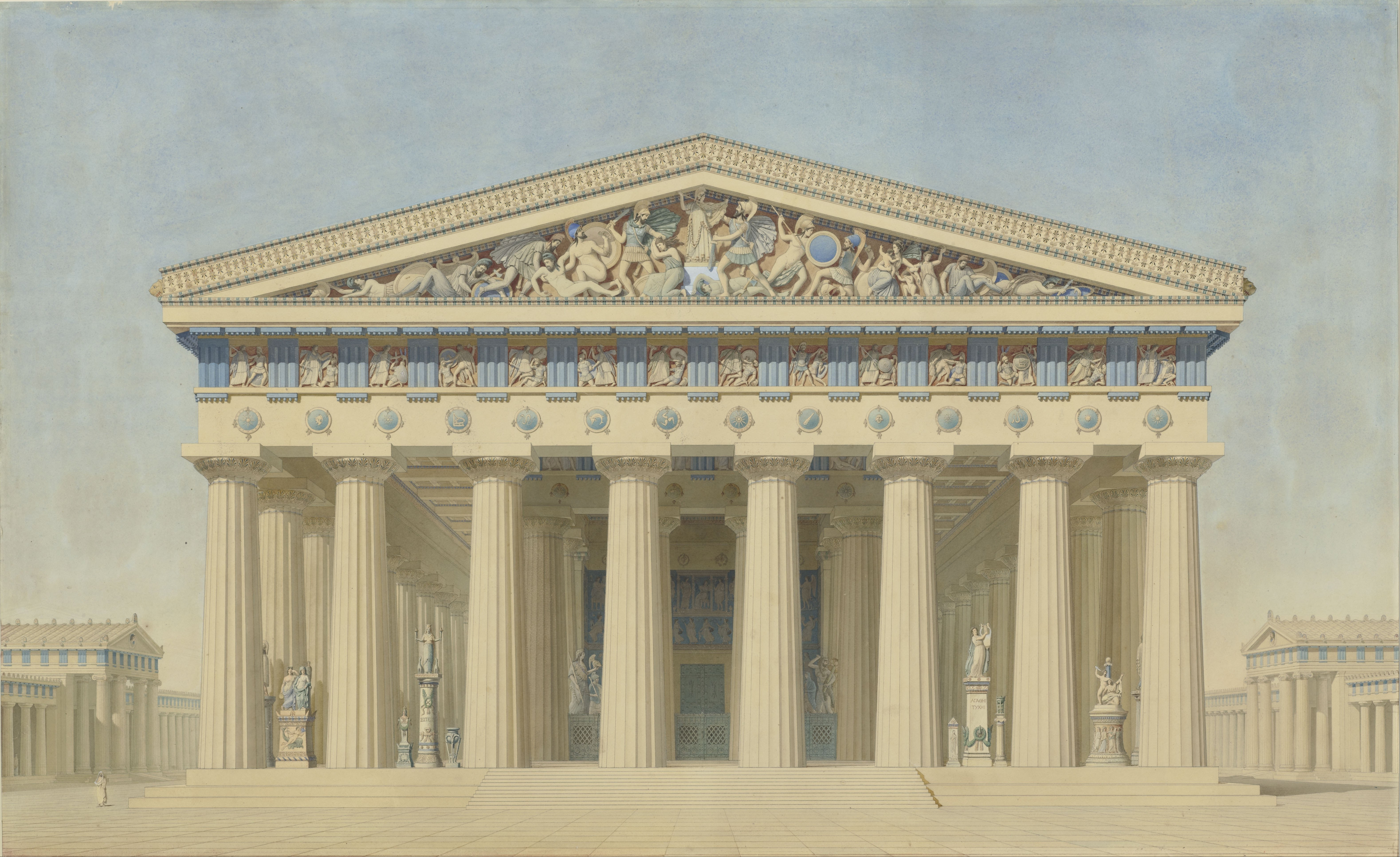
Ancient Greek medallion on the architrave of the Temple T at Selinunte, Sicily, illustration by Jacques Ignace Hittorff, before 1859

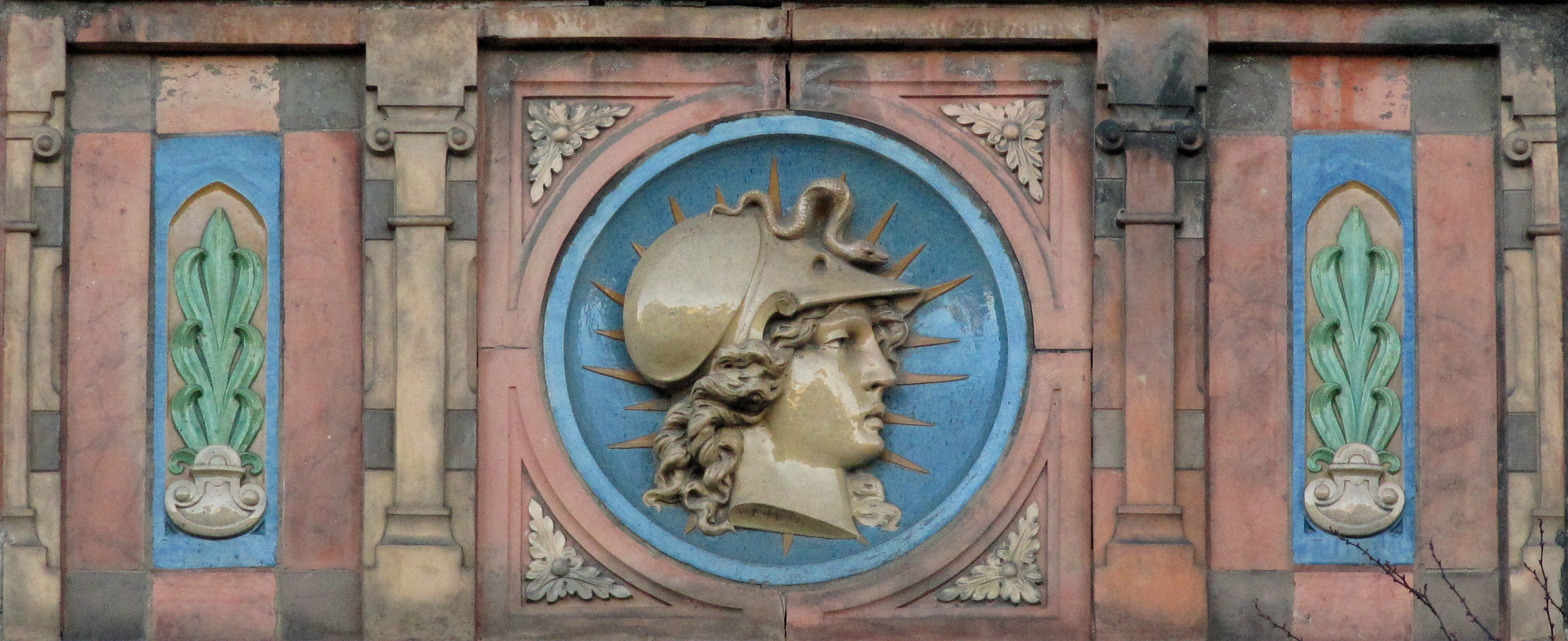
Neoclassical polychrome medallion on the Beaux Arts facade of the Lycée Carnot, Dijon, designed by Arthur Chaudouet, 1885–1893

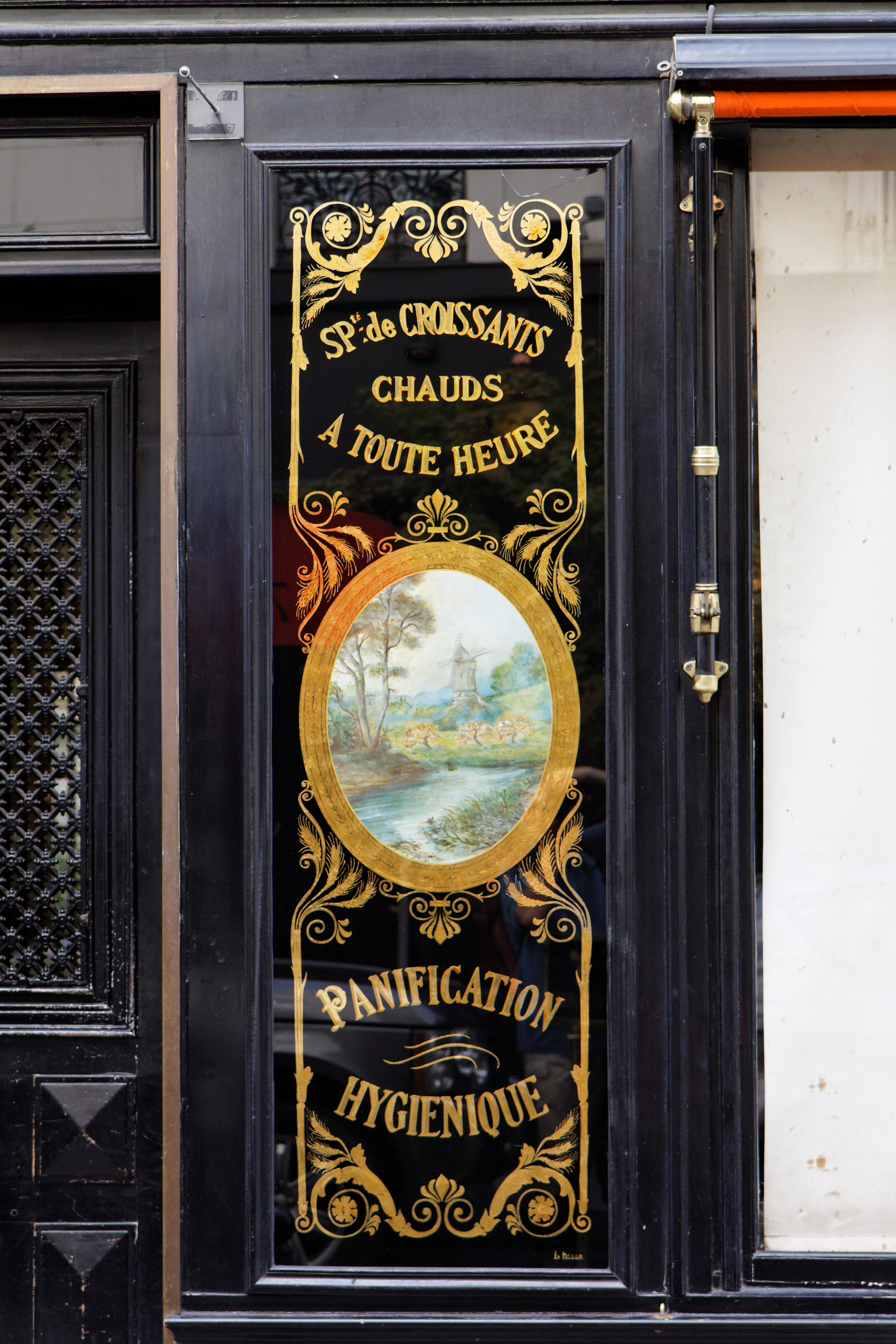
Neoclassical medallion on the facade of Le Moulin de la Vierge (Rue Saint-Dominique no. 64), Paris, by Benits et Fils, c. 1900

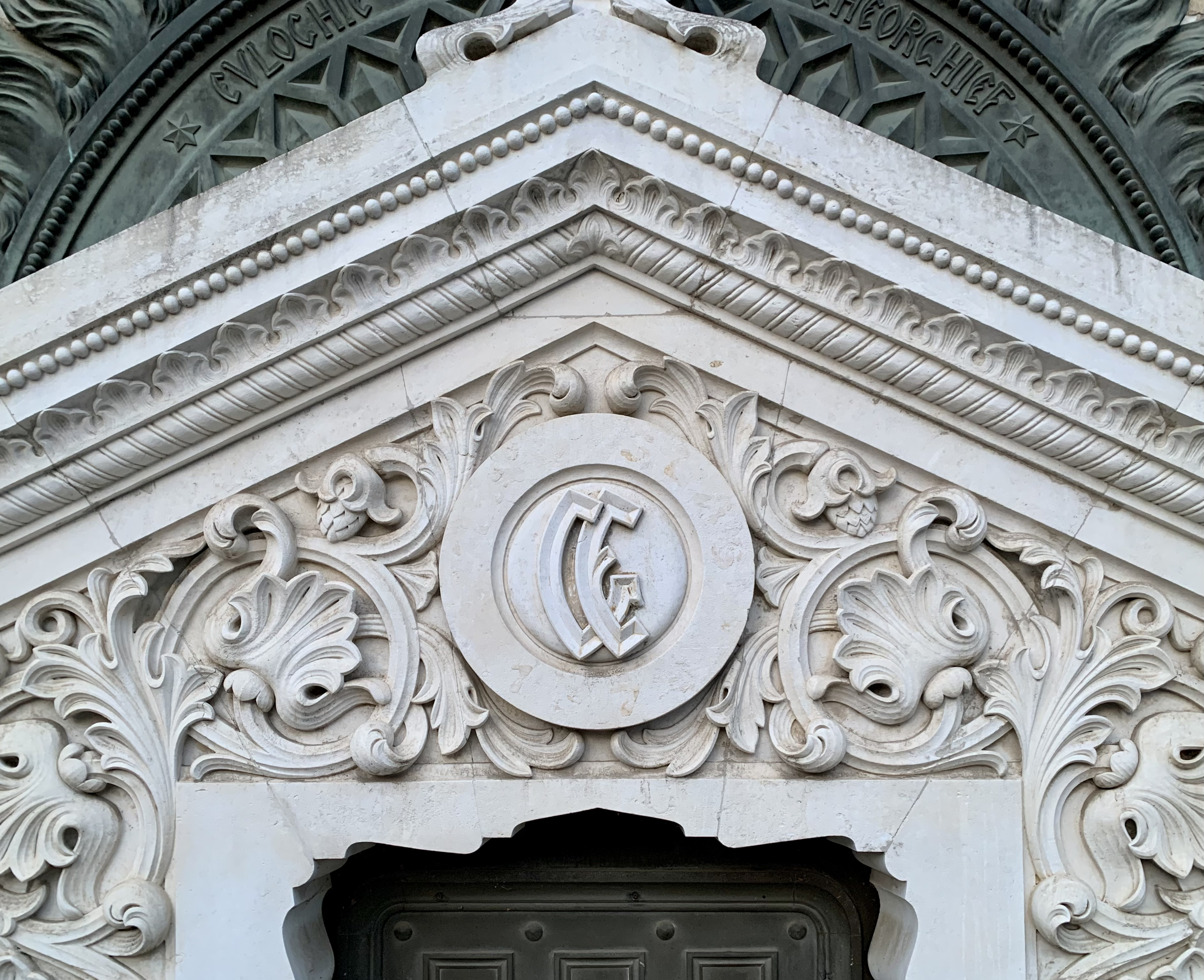
Romanian Revival medallion on the Grave of Georgiev Brothers, Bellu Cemetery, Bucharest, by Ion Mincu, c. 1900

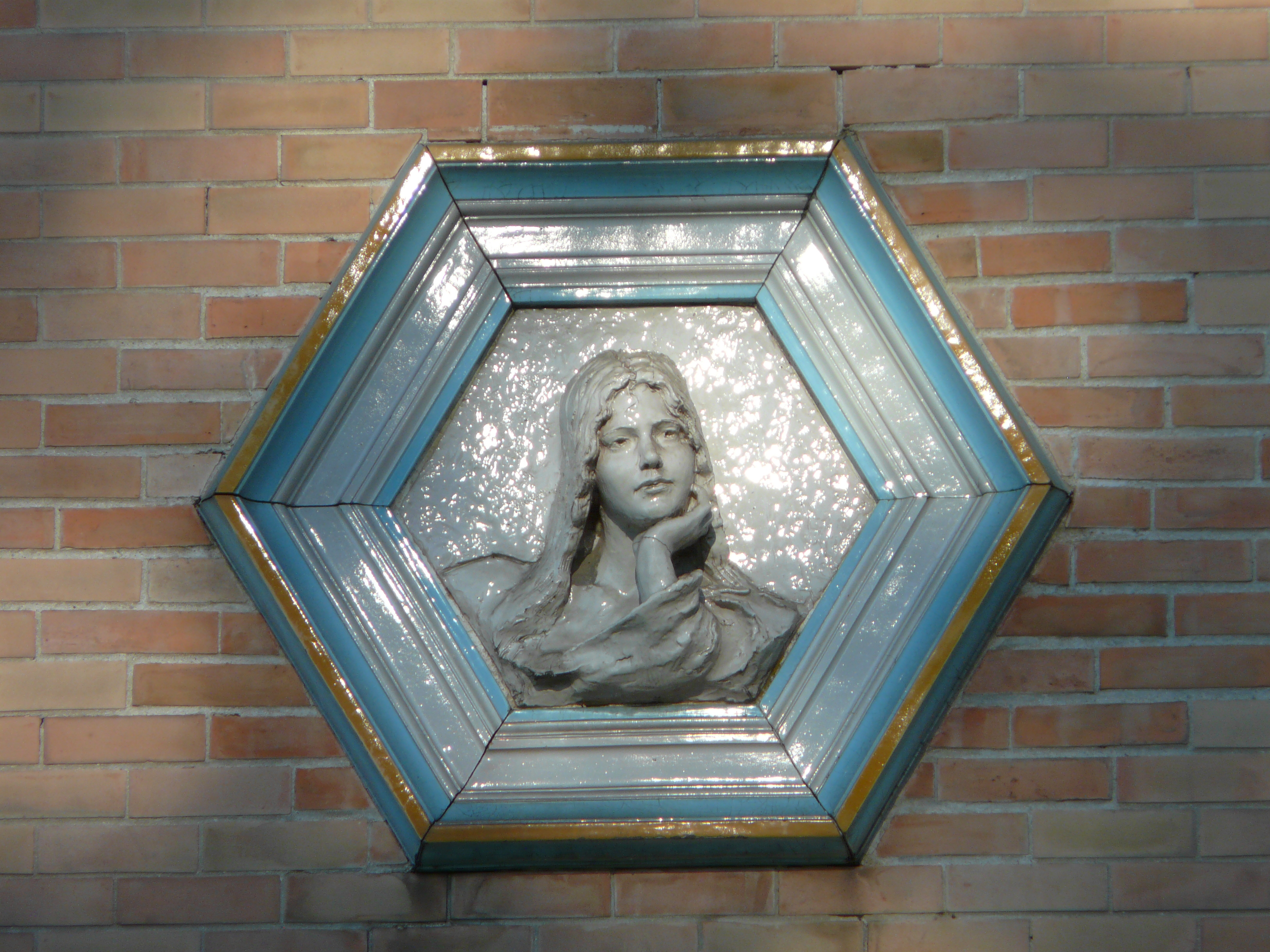
Hexagonal ceramic medallion on the Villa La Sapinière, Évian-les-Bains, France, architect Jean-Camille Formigé and sculptor Alexandre Falguière, 1892–1896

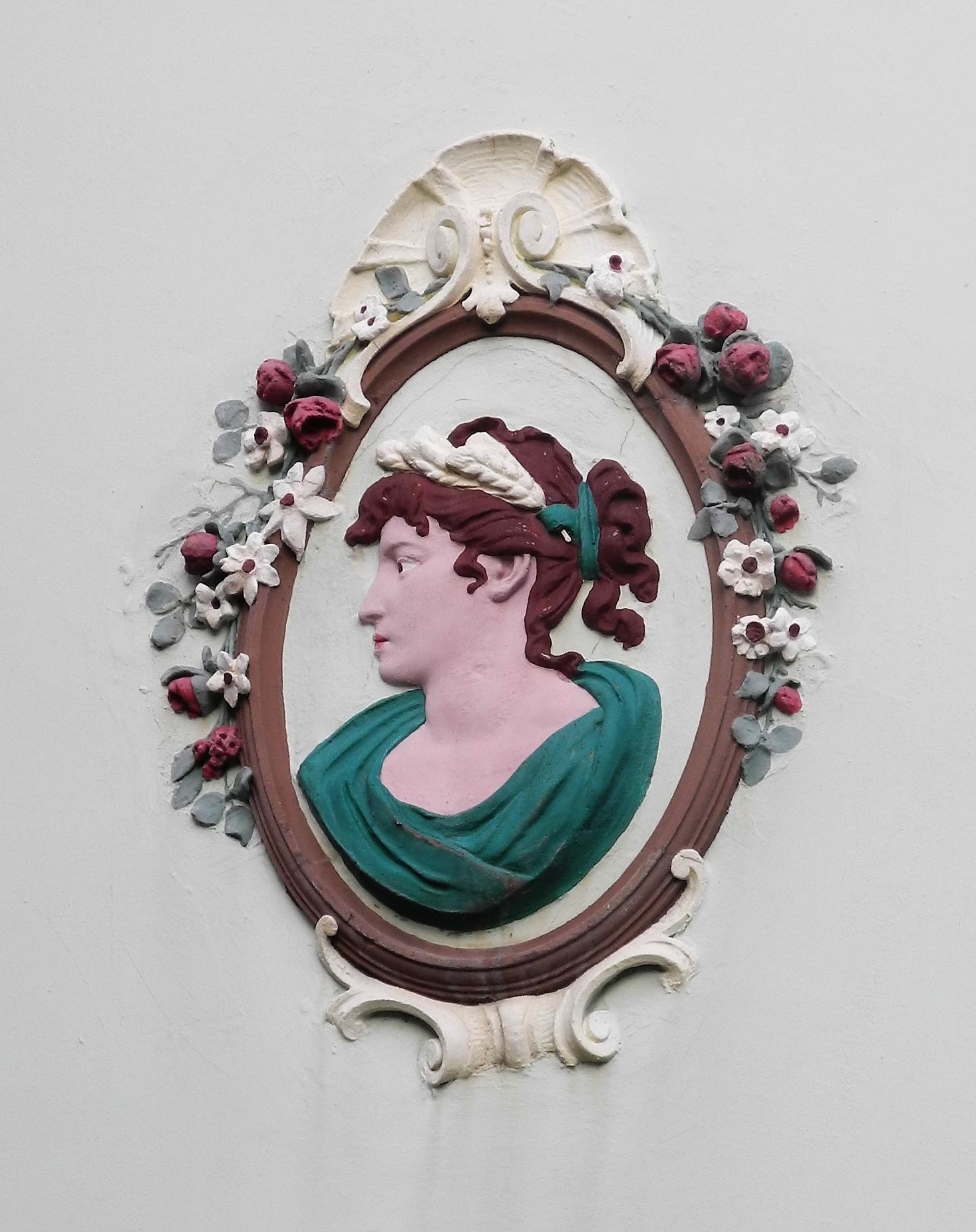
Rococo Revival polychrome medallion on the facade of Beckershoffstraße no. 7, Mettmann, Germany, unknown architect, 1902

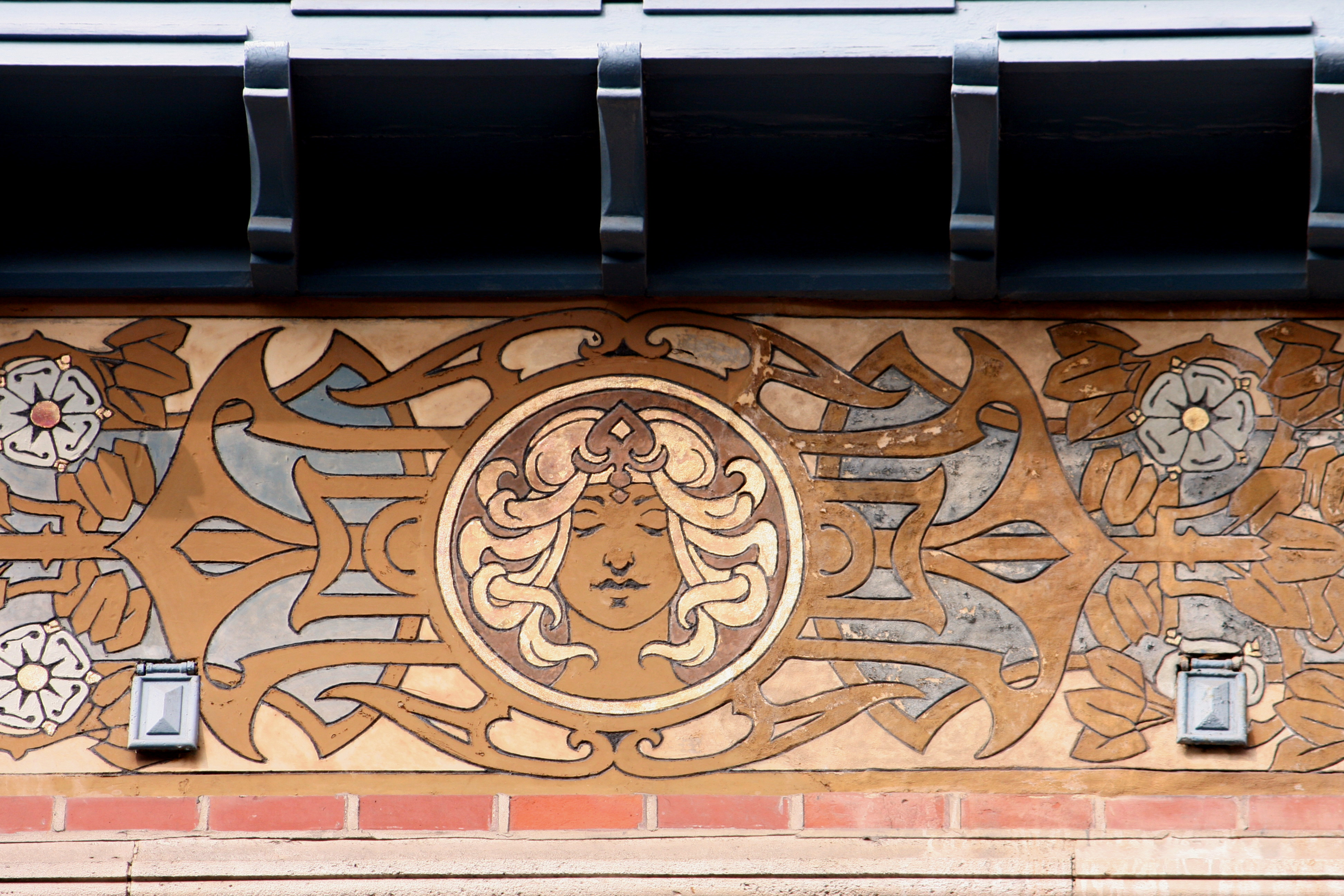
Art Nouveau sgraffito medallion of Rue d'Espagne no. 40, Brussels, Belgium, by Pierre Van de Wattynes, 1902

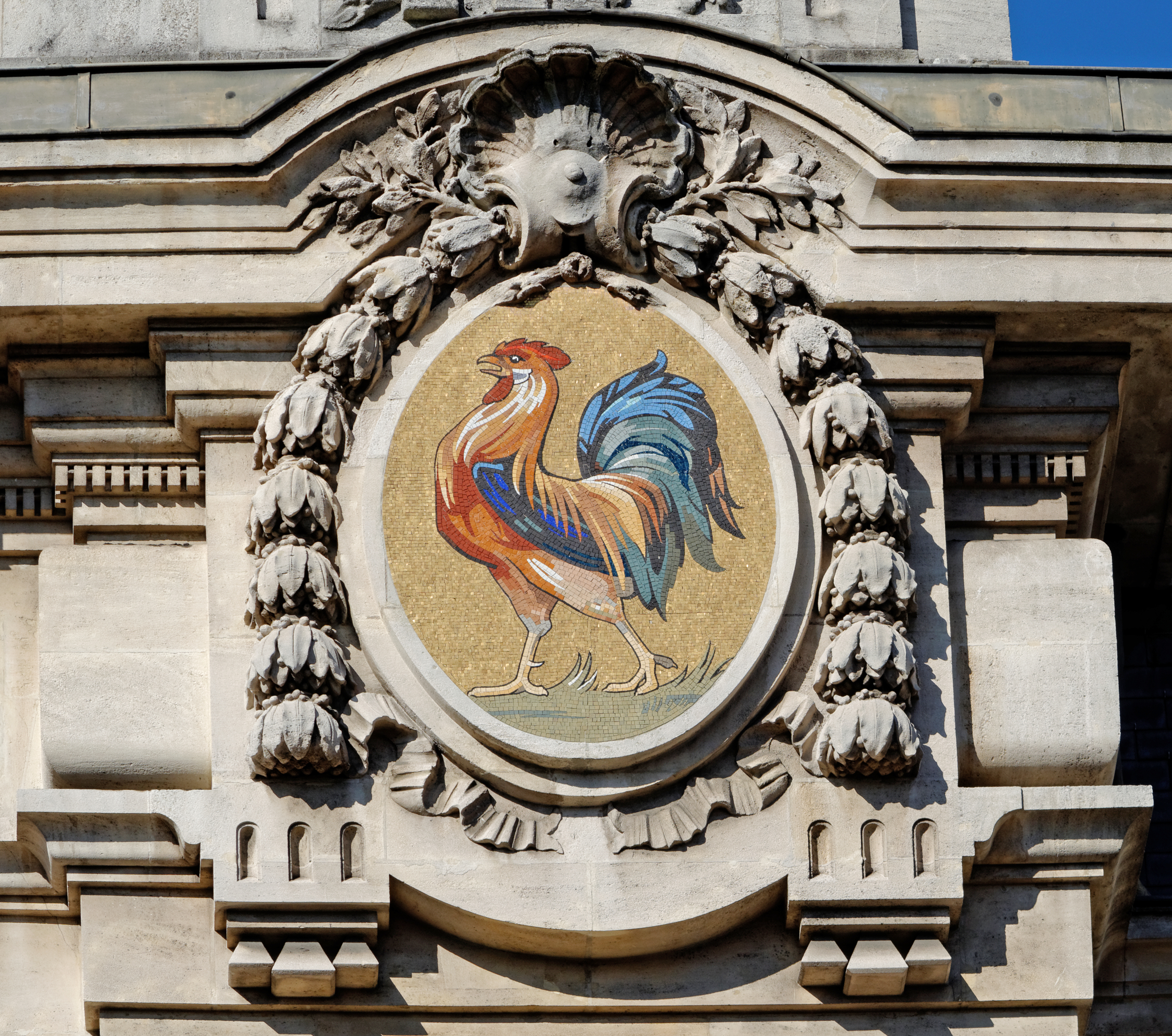
Louis XVI style-inspired Beaux Arts medallion with mosaic on the facade of the Hôtel des Postes de Dijon, designed by Louis Perreau, 1907–1909

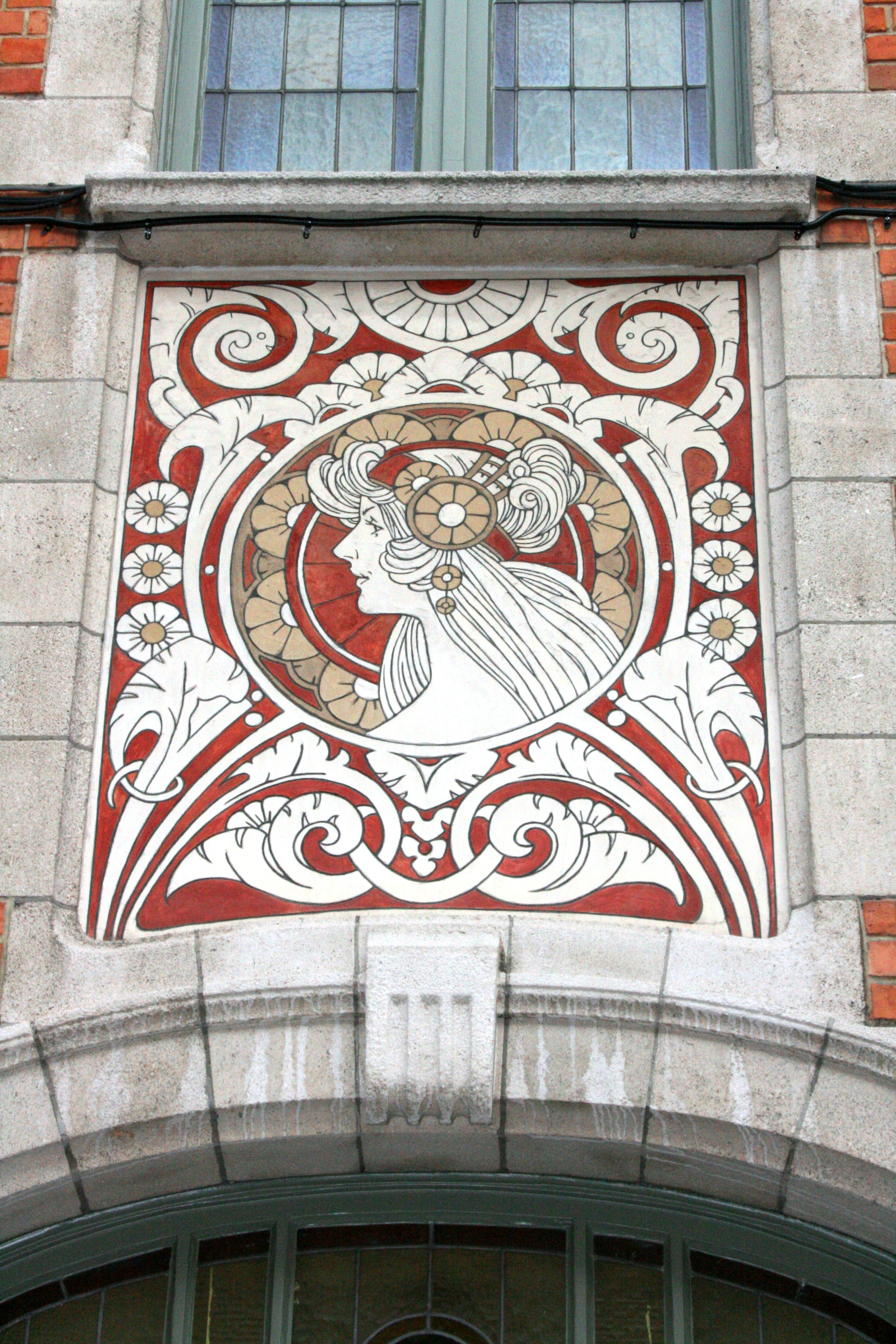
Art Nouveau sgraffito medallion on Rue Ernest Laude no. 20, Brussels, by Joseph Diongre and Privat Livemont, 1908

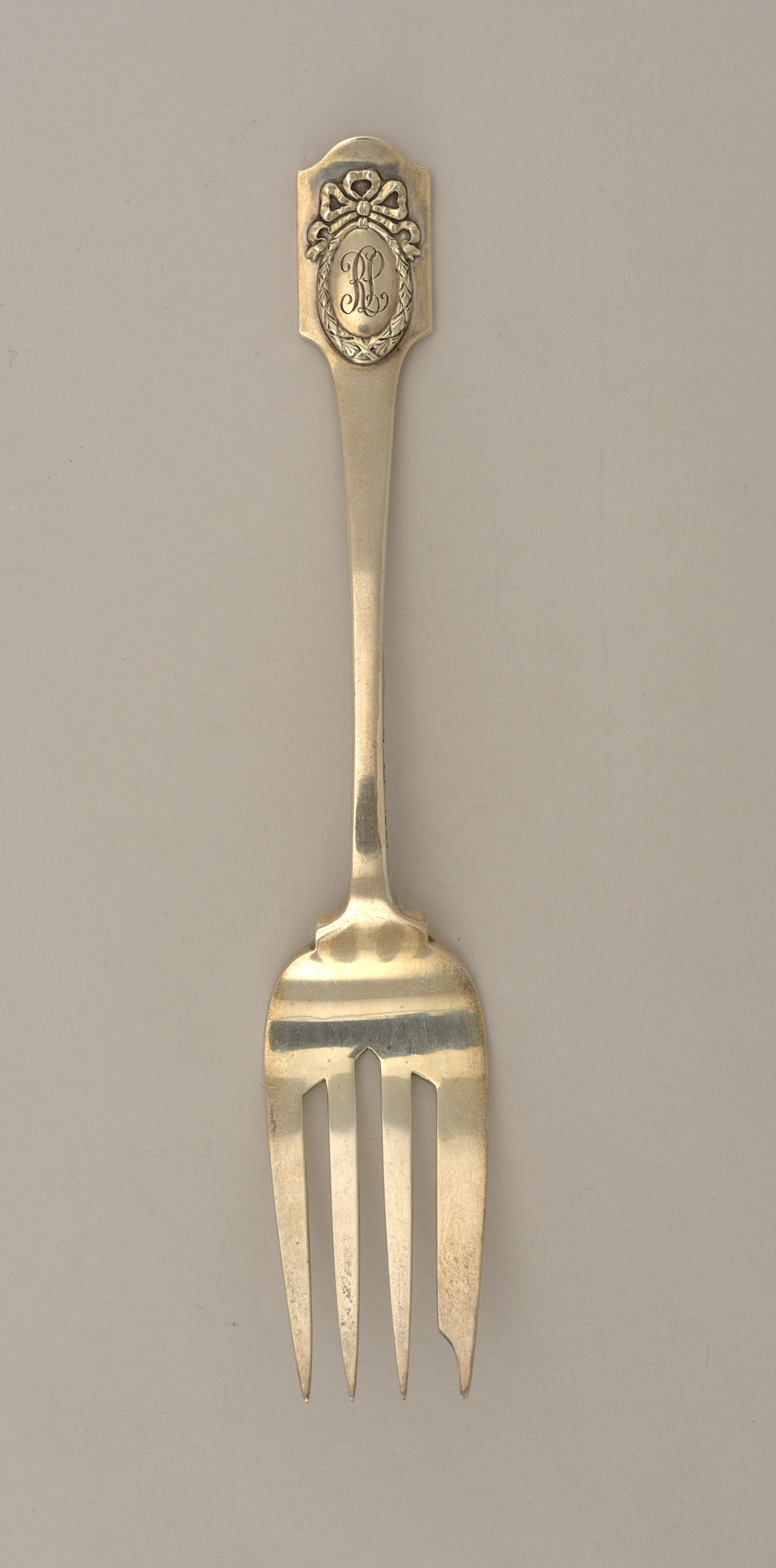
Neo-Louis XVI style fork with medallion and monogram, by Shreve & Co., c. 1909, silver, Cooper Hewitt, Smithsonian Design Museum, New York City

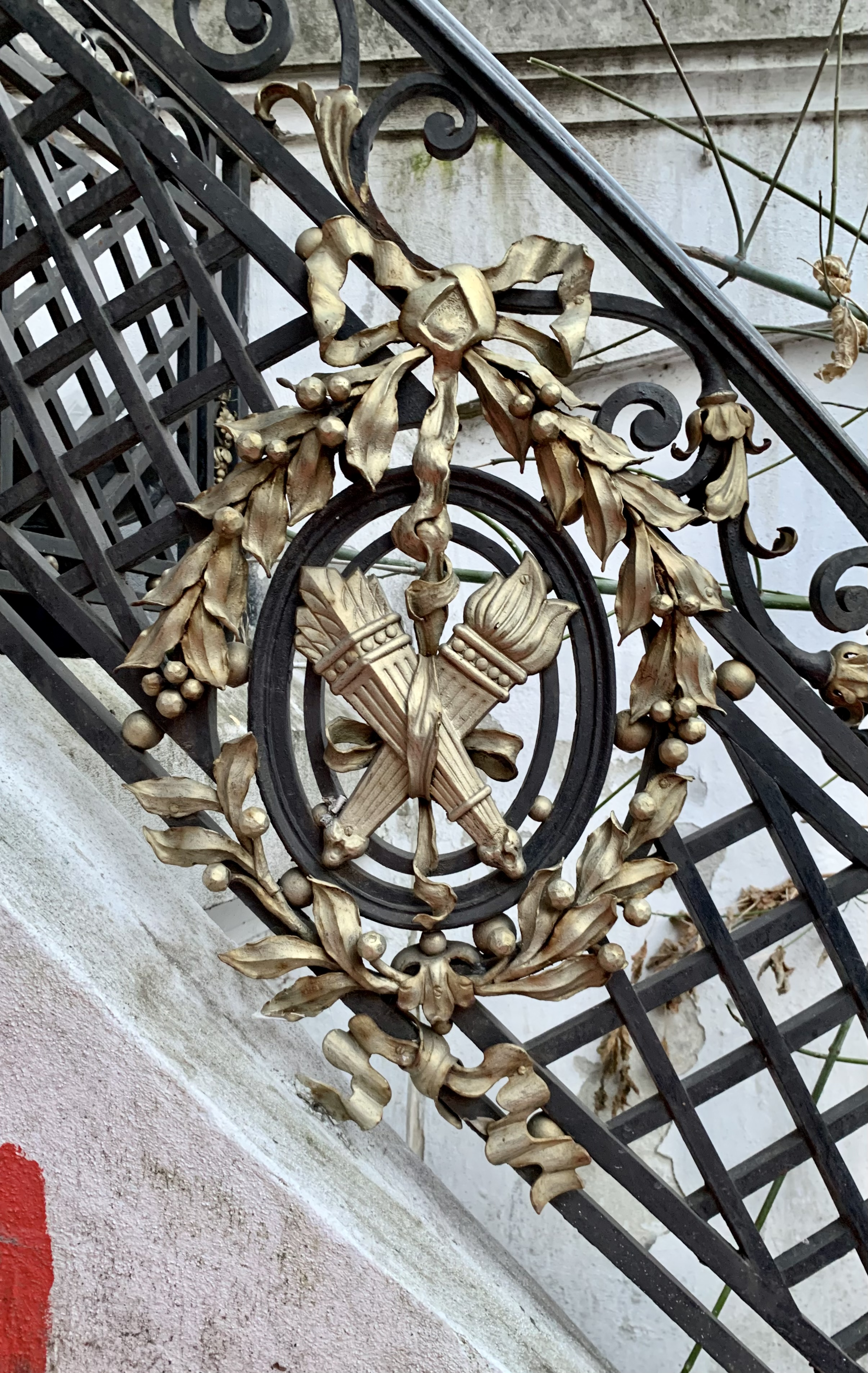
Neo-Louis XVI style medallion on a stair railing of the Nicolae T. Filitti/Nae Filitis House (Calea Dorobanților no. 18), Bucharest, by Ernest Doneaud, c.1910

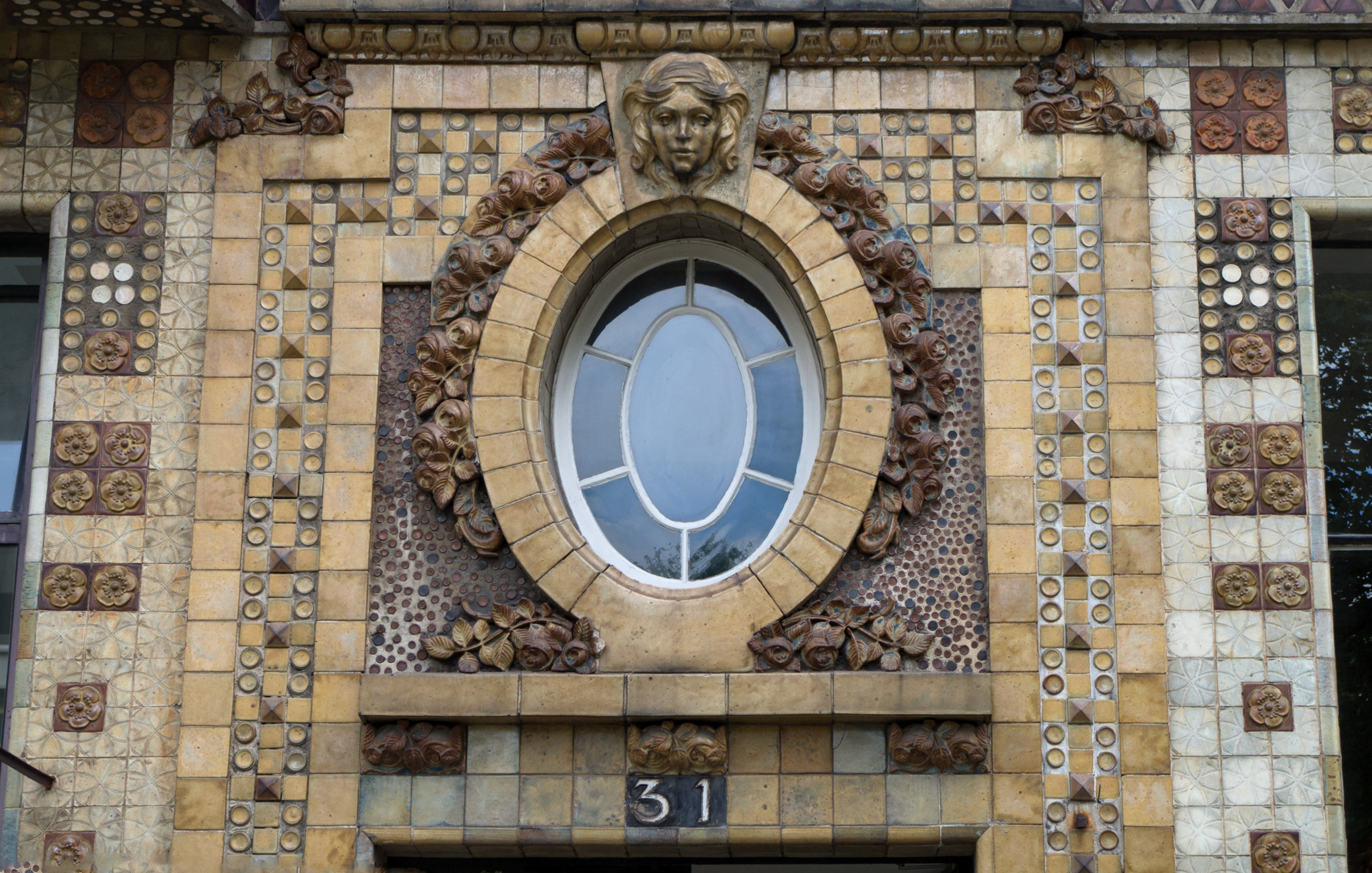
Louis XVI style-inspired medallion-shaped oculus, with rose garlands at the top, of Rue Campagne Première no. 31, Paris, by Alexandre Bigot (ceramist) and André Arfvidson (architect), 1911

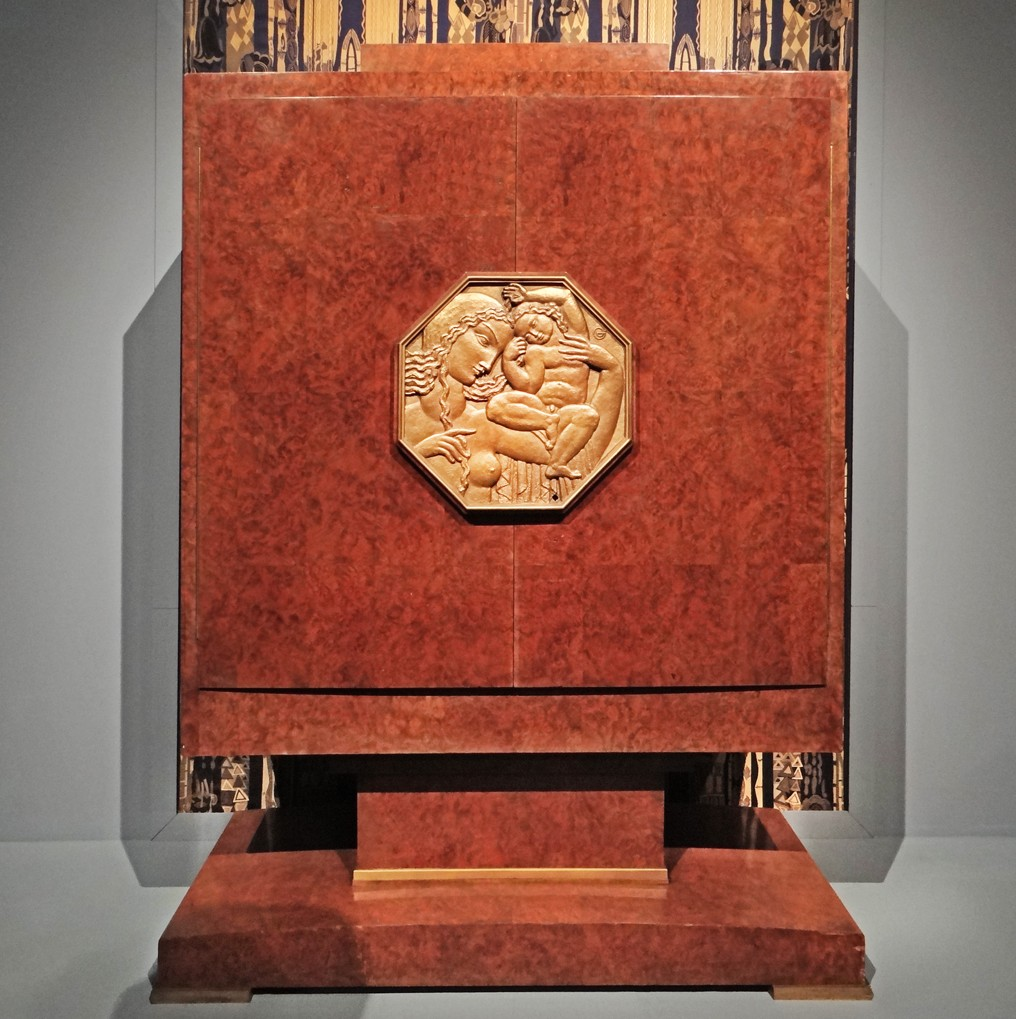
Art Deco octagon-shaped medallion on a makeup cabinet, medallion by Alfred Janniot and cabinet by Jacques-Émile Ruhlmann, c. 1929

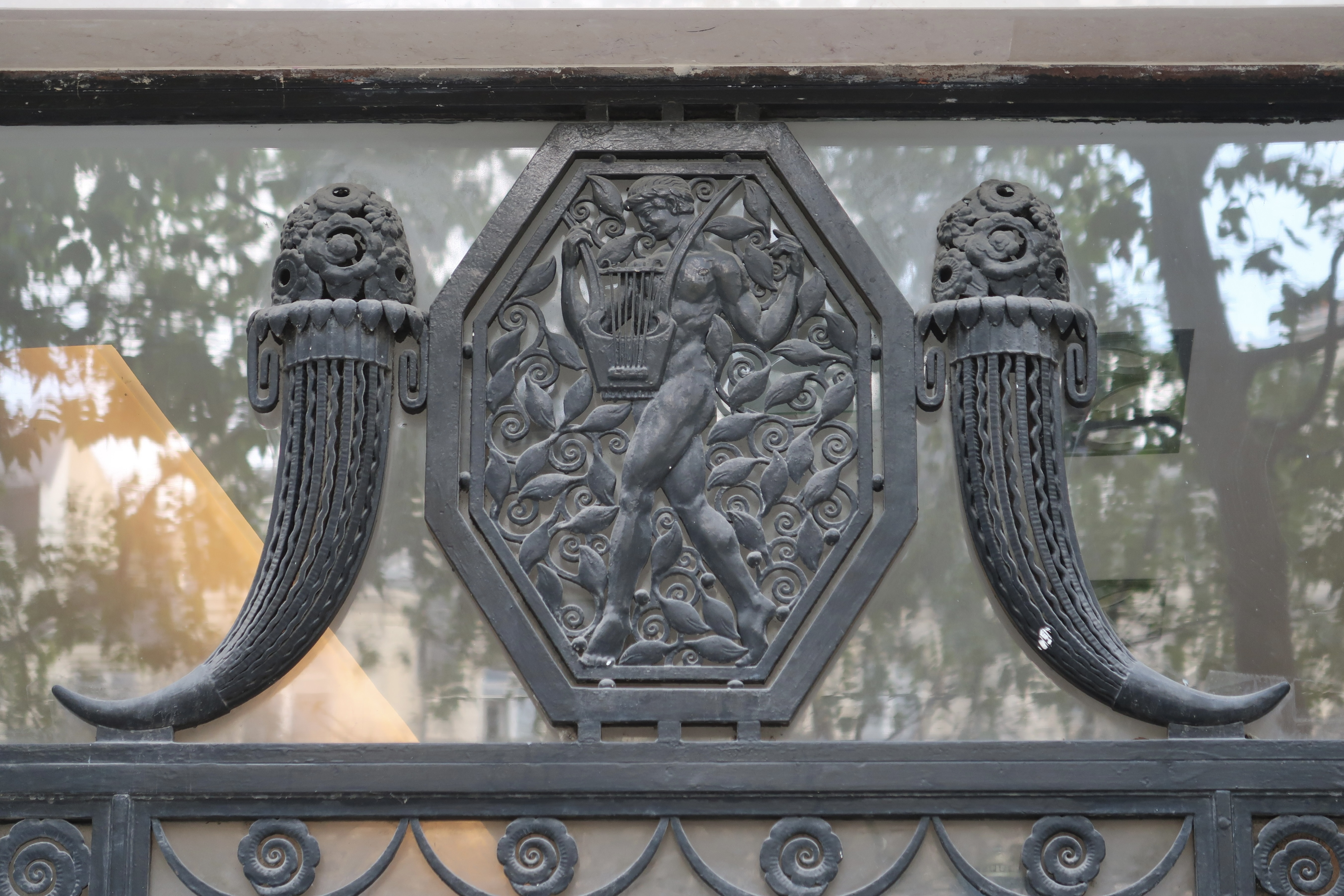
Art Deco octagon medallion with cornucopias of Avenue des Champs-Élysées no. 77, Paris, unknown architect, c. 1930

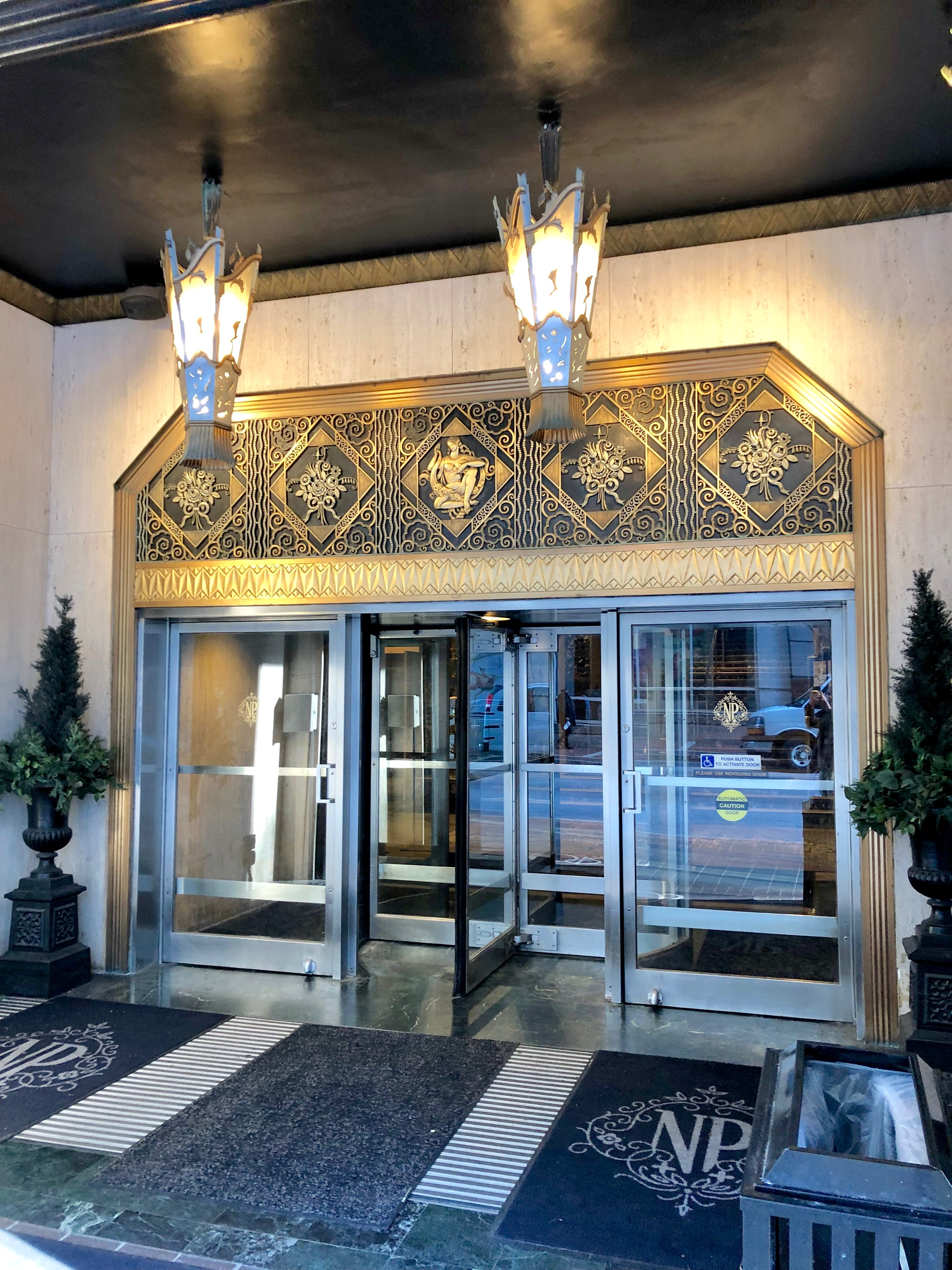
Art Deco square medallions above the entrance of the Hilton Cincinnati Netherland Plaza (West 5th Street no. 35), Cincinnati, US, by Walter W. Ahlschlager and Delano & Aldrich, 1931

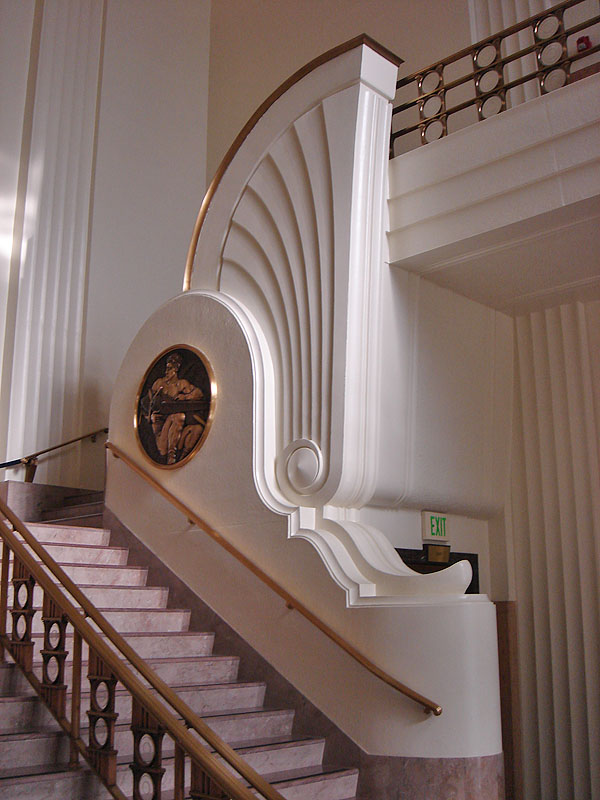
Art Deco round medallion in the Burbank City Hall, US, by William Allen and W. George Lutzi, 1943

== See also ==
- Floor medallion
- Tondo (art): round (circular)
- Cartouche (design): oval, rectangular or with a more complex shape
