= Cherry Blossoms (marriage agency) =

Social networking and personals service

- Type: International dating; Online dating; Transnational marriage; Social networking
- Founded: 1974; 52 years ago
- Headquarters: Indianapolis, Indiana, United States
- Key people: Mike Krosky, President
- Products: Online dating website and services
- Website: www.blossoms.com

Cherry Blossoms is an international online dating and social networking service specializing in international relationships and dating, with a particular focus on connecting men and women from different countries. The service has historically been associated with international matchmaking and the mail-order bride industry.

== History ==
Cherry Blossoms was established in 1974 as a printed catalog featuring personal advertisements. Customers could purchase listings that included contact information and correspond directly with women featured in the catalog. Photographs were later added to the listings, followed by color photographs.

In 1995, Cherry Blossoms introduced its first web-based service while continuing to publish its printed magazine. By 2001, the company had transitioned to an entirely web-based format.

According to company president Mike Krosky, Cherry Blossoms operates in more than 100 countries, with a particular focus on China, South America, and the Philippines.

=== Notable cases ===
Cases of abuse and murder involving couples who met through Cherry Blossoms have been reported, including the case of Jack Reeves, who was convicted of murdering two of his wives.
