= Online dating =

Romantic relationships formed on the internet

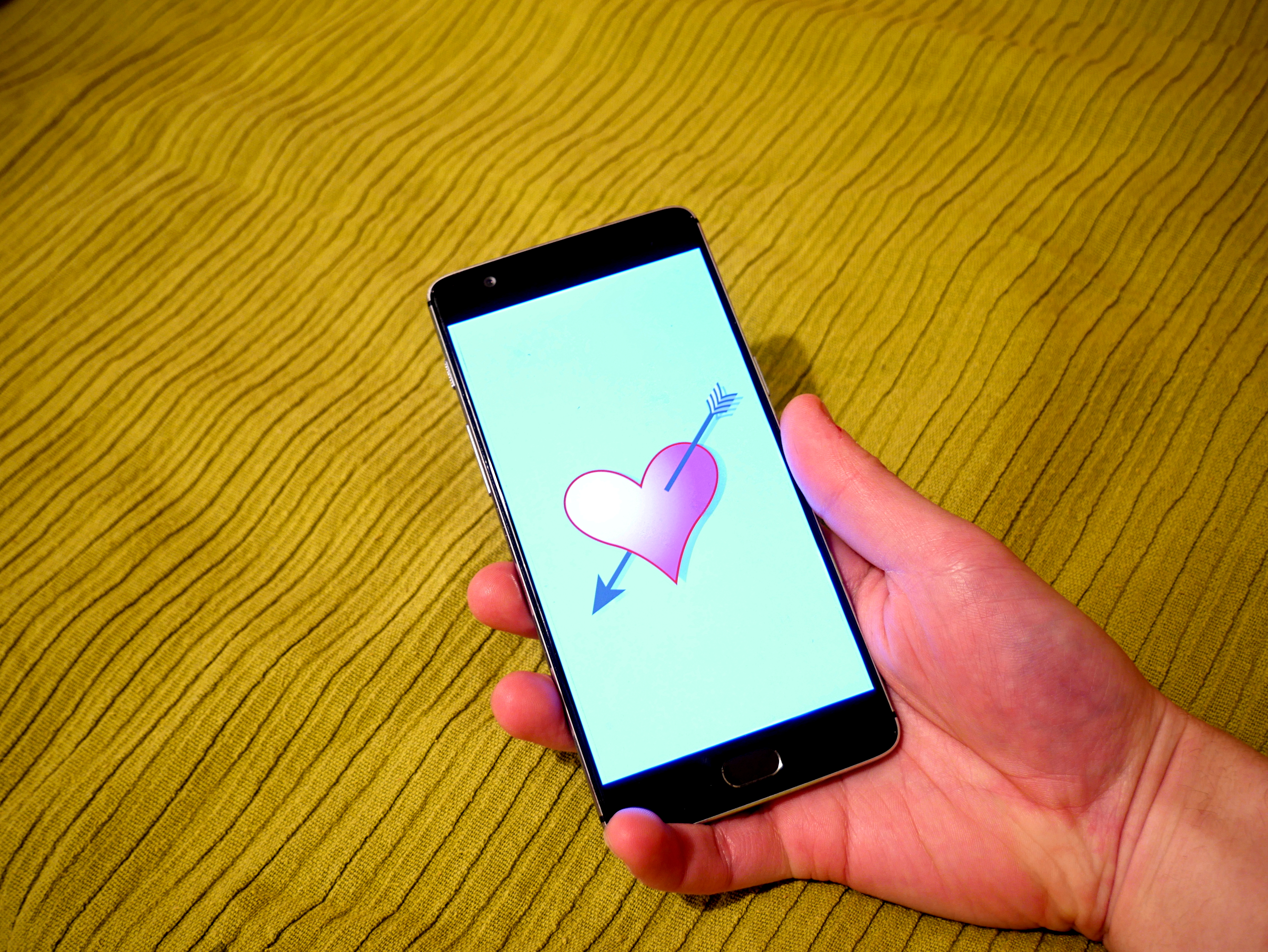
Since the 2010s, Internet dating has become more popular with smartphones.

Online dating, also known as internet dating, virtual dating, or mobile app dating, is a method used by people with a goal of searching for and interacting with potential romantic or sexual partners, via the internet. An online dating service is a company that promotes and provides specific mechanisms for the practice of online dating, generally in the form of dedicated websites or software applications accessible on personal computers or mobile devices connected to the internet. A wide variety of unmoderated matchmaking services, most of which are profile-based with various communication functionalities, is offered by such companies.

Online dating services allow users to become "members" by creating a profile and uploading personal information including (but not limited to) age, gender, sexual orientation, location, and appearance. Most services also encourage members to add photos or videos to their profile. Once a profile has been created, members can view the profiles of other members of the service, using the visible profile information to decide whether or not to initiate contact. Most services offer digital messaging, while others provide additional services such as webcasts, online chat, telephone chat (VoIP), and message boards. Members can constrain their interactions to the online space, or they can arrange a date to meet in person.

A great diversity of online dating services currently exist. Some have a broad membership base of diverse users looking for many different types of relationships. Other sites target highly specific demographics based on features like shared interests, location, religion, sexual orientation or relationship type. Online dating services also differ widely in their revenue streams. Some sites are completely free and depend on advertising for revenue. Others utilize the freemium revenue model, offering free registration and use, with optional, paid, premium services. Still others rely solely on paid membership subscriptions.

== Trends ==
=== Social trends and public opinions ===
A 2005 study found that online daters may have more liberal social attitudes compared to the general population in the United States.

=== Race and online dating ===
A 2009 study found that African Americans were the least desired demographic in online dating; and were the least interested in forming interracial relationships with non-Black Americans.

In 2008, a study investigated racial preferences using a sample of 6,070 profiles on Yahoo! Personals. Just 29% of white men excluded women of color, compared to the 64% of white women who excluded men of color. Follow-up studies conducted by these authors in 2009 and 2011 found similar patterns: white women were less open to interracial relationships than white men.

In 2018, a study analyzed the activity of approximately 200,000 users of an online dating app in the United States. The authors found that White men and Asian women were the most desired.

In 2021, a comprehensive analysis of online dating trends in the United States suggested that the rise of online dating has exacerbated underlying racial biases in dating. The authors found that White men were preferred by women of color, while men of color generally preferred women of color. White men were accepting of Asian and Hispanic women, yet White women tended to exclude non-White men.

These authors also disputed some common notions about racial bias in online dating. For example, White women did not reject Asian men more so than Black or Hispanic men. Black and Hispanic women were just as accepting of Asian men as they were of men of the same race. This is inconsistent with the idea that Asian men are particularly disadvantaged in online dating, relative to other men of color. The authors also dispute the notion that Asian women's high outmarriage rate is due to "self hatred", as their interviews found that these marriages form out of perceived compatibility, rather than self hatred. Gay Hispanic men did not have a preference for white partners.

=== Gender ===
According to a 2018 study, among American daters, male desirability increased until the age of 50; while women's desirability declined steeply after the age of 20.

Developmental psychologist Michelle Drouin, who was not involved in the study, told The New York Times this finding is in accordance with theories in psychology and sociology based on biological evolution in that youth is a sign of fertility. She added that women with advanced degrees are often viewed as more focused on their careers than family. Licensed psychotherapist Stacy Kaiser told MarketWatch men typically prefer younger women because "they are more easy to impress; they are more (moldable) in terms of everything from emotional behavior to what type of restaurant to eat at," and because they tend to be "more fit, have less expectations and less baggage." On the other hand, women look for (financial) stability and education, attributes that come with age, said Kaiser. These findings regarding age and attractiveness are consistent with earlier research by the online dating services OKCupid and Zoosk.

In terms of educational attainment, men's desirability generally increases the more educated they are, but for women the effect of education on their desirability is more mixed. Ong (2016) found that women's interest in men's profiles increased with the profile's education level whereas men's interest in women's was unaffected. According to Whyte and Torgler (2017), women are more likely to contact a potential mate with higher educational levels relative to their own, but increased age lessens their disfavor towards the less educated in the dating market, which is the opposite for men for whom it matters more the older they get. Bruch and Newman (2017) observed that men's desirability increased the more educated they were, but women's desirability only increased up to a bachelor's degree and decreased after that. Jonason and Antoon (2019) found that similarly educated was most preferred and more educated was second most preferred for both men and women. Neyt et al. (2019) observed that women preferred higher-educated men, having two times higher odds of liking men's profiles if they had the highest education level, but men had no such favor towards higher-educated, although they disfavored lesser-educated women's profiles. In a study by Egebark et al. (2021), high-educated men preferred low-educated over high-educated dating profiles as much as high-educated women preferred high-educated over low-educated profiles.

In 2016, Gareth Tyson of the Queen Mary University of London and his colleagues published a paper analyzing the behavior of Tinder users in New York City and London. In order to minimize the number of variables, they created profiles of white heterosexual people only. For each sex, there were three accounts using stock photographs, two with actual photographs of volunteers, one with no photos whatsoever, and one that was apparently deactivated. The researchers pointedly only used pictures of people of average physical attractiveness. Tyson and his team wrote an algorithm that collected the biographical information of all the matches, liked them all, then counted the number of returning likes.

They found that men and women employed drastically different mating strategies. Men liked a large proportion of the profiles they viewed, but received returning likes only 0.6% of the time; women were much more selective but received matches 10% of the time. Men received matches at a much slower rate than women. Once they received a match, women were far more likely than men to send a message, 21% compared to 7%, but they took more time before doing so. Tyson and his team found that for the first two-thirds of messages from each sex, women sent them within 18 minutes of receiving a match compared to five minutes for men. Men's first messages had an average of a dozen characters, and were typical simple greetings; by contrast, initial messages by women averaged 122 characters.

Tyson and his collaborators found that the male profiles that had three profile pictures received far more matches than those without one. By sending out questionnaires to frequent Tinder users, the researchers discovered that the reason why men tended to like a large proportion of the women they saw was to increase their chances of getting a match. This led to a feedback loop in which men liked more and more of the profiles they saw while women could afford to be even more selective in liking profiles because of a greater probability of a match.

Aided by the text-analysis program Linguistic Inquiry and Word Count, Bruch and Newman discovered that men generally had lower chances of receiving a response after sending more "positively worded" messages. When a man tried to woo a woman more desirable than he was, he received a response 21% of the time; by contrast, when a woman attempted to court a man, she received a reply about half the time. In fact, over 80% of the first messages in the data set obtained for the purposes of the study were from men, and women were highly selective in choosing whom to respond to, a rate of less than 20%. Therefore, studying women's replies yielded much insight into their preferences. Bruch and Newman were also able to establish the existence of dating 'leagues'. Generally speaking, people were able to accurately estimate where they ranked on the dating hierarchy. Very few responded to the messages of people less desirable than they were. Nevertheless, although the probability of a response is low, it is well above zero, and if the other person does respond, it can be a self-esteem booster, said Kaiser. Co-author of the study Mark Newman told BBC News, "There is a trade-off between how far up the ladder you want to reach and how low a reply rate you are willing to put up with." Bruch and Newman found that while people spent a lot of time crafting lengthy messages to those they considered to be a highly desirable partner, this hardly made a difference, judging by the response rate. Keeping messages concise is well-advised. Previous studies also suggest that about 70% of the dating profile should be about oneself and the rest about the desired partner.

Data from the Chinese online dating giant Zhenai.com reveals that while men are most interested in how a woman looks, women care more about a man's income. Profession is also quite important. Chinese men favor women working as primary school teachers and nurses while Chinese women prefer men in the IT or finance industry. Women in IT or finance are the least desired. Zhenai enables users to send each other digital "winks". For a man, the more money he earns the more "winks" he receives. For a woman, her income does not matter until the 50,000-yuan mark (US$7,135), after which the number of "winks" falls slightly. Men typically prefer women three years younger than they are whereas women look for men who are three years older on average. However, this changes if the man becomes exceptionally wealthy; the more money he makes the more likely he is to look for younger women.

In general, people in their 20s employ the "self-service dating service" while women in their late 20s and up tend to use the matchmaking service. This is because of the social pressure in China on "leftover women" (Sheng nu), meaning those in their late 20s but still not married. Women who prefer not to ask potentially embarrassing questions – such as whether both spouses will handle household finances, whether or not they will live with his parents, or how many children he wants to have, if any – will get a matchmaker to do it for them. Both sexes prefer matchmakers who are women.

=== Desirability and physical appearance ===
At least three quarters of the sample surveyed attempted to date aspirationally, meaning they tried to initiate a relationship with someone who was more desirable, 25% more desirable, to be exact. Bruch recommended sending out more greeting messages, noting that people sometimes managed to upgrade their 'league'. Michael Rosenfeld, a sociologist not involved with the study, told The Atlantic, "The idea that persistence pays off makes sense to me, as the online-dating world has a wider choice set of potential mates to choose from. The greater choice set pays dividends to people who are willing to be persistent in trying to find a mate." Using optimal stopping theory, one can show that the best way to select the best potential partner is to reject the first 37%, then pick the one who is better than the previous set. The probability of picking the best potential mate this way is 37%. (This is approximately the reciprocal of Euler's number, $e = \lim_{x \rightarrow 0} (1 + x)^{1/x} \approx 2.718281828$. See derivation of the optimal policy.) However, making online contact is only the first step, and indeed, most conversations failed to birth a relationship. As two potential partners interact more and more, the superficial information available from a dating website or smartphone application becomes less important than their characters.

Despite being a platform designed to be less centered on physical appearance, OkCupid co-founder Christian Rudder stated in 2009 that the male OkCupid users who were rated most physically attractive by female OkCupid users received 11 times as many messages as the lowest-rated male users did, the medium-rated male users received about four times as many messages, and the one-third of female users who were rated most physically attractive by the male users received about two-thirds of all messages sent by male users. According to a former company product manager, the majority of female Bumble users typically set a floor height of six feet for male users which limits their matching opportunities to only 15% of the male population.

=== Niche dating sites ===
Sites with specific demographics have become popular as a way to narrow the pool of potential matches. Successful niche sites pair people by race, sexual orientation or religion. In March 2008, the top 5 overall sites held 7% less market share than they did one year ago while the top sites from the top five major niche dating categories made considerable gains. Niche sites cater to people with special interests, such as sports fans, racing and automotive fans, medical or other professionals, people with political or religious preferences, people with medical conditions, or those living in rural farm communities.

Some dating services have been created specifically for those living with HIV and other venereal diseases in an effort to eliminate the need to lie about one's health in order to find a partner. Public health officials in Rhode Island and Utah claimed in 2015 that Tinder and similar apps were responsible for uptick of such conditions.

Some sites, referred to as adult dating sites, match individuals seeking short-term sexual encounters.

=== Economic trends ===
Although some sites offer free trials and/or profiles, most memberships can cost upwards of $60 per month. In 2008, online dating services in the United States generated $957 million in revenue.

Most free dating websites depend on advertising revenue, using tools such as Google AdSense and affiliate marketing. Since advertising revenues are modest compared to membership fees, this model requires numerous page views to achieve profitability. However, Sam Yagan describes dating sites as ideal advertising platforms because of the wealth of demographic data made available by users.

In November 2023, the stock prices of Match Group and Bumble were down 31% and 35% on the year respectively, continuing a more than two-year decline since the latter's initial public offering in February 2021 and after posting declines more than double that of the S&P 500 during the 2022 stock market decline. In addition to price increases, slowing paid user growth, and flattening app download rates following the end of the COVID-19 lockdowns, assessments among financial analysts of an oversaturated market, concerns about low consumer satisfaction with the services, and growing skepticism about dating app features and algorithms contributed to the declines. Match Group and Bumble account for nearly the entire market share of the online dating industry, and the companies lost a combined $40 billion in market value from 2021 through 2024. Match Group and Bumble shares continued to fall during the first quarter of 2024 while the S&P 500 rose, and the number of paid users for Match Group fell by 6% during the first quarter of 2024 while Bumble's paid users grew by 18% in comparison to a 3% decline and a 31% increase for each company respectively during the first quarter of 2023.

Apps such as Rizz and Winggg, marketed as "AI wingmen," generate dating profiles and opening messages, and have formed a commercial niche alongside general-purpose chatbots. A 2026 research paper described this as an extension of the optimization built into dating apps, with users applying the same efficiency-seeking from swiping to the messages they send.

=== Matching and divorce rates ===
In 2012, social psychologists Benjamin Karney, Harry Reis, and others published an analysis of online dating in Psychological Science in the Public Interest that concluded that the matching algorithms of online dating services are only negligibly better at matching people than if they were matched at random. In 2014, Kang Zhao at the University of Iowa constructed a new approach based on the algorithms used by Amazon and Netflix, based on recommendations rather than the autobiographical notes of match seekers. Users' activities reflect their tastes and attractiveness, or the lack thereof, they reasoned. This algorithm increases the chances of a response by 40%, the researchers found. E-commerce firms also employ this "collaborative filtering" technique. Nevertheless, it is still not known what the algorithm for finding the perfect match would be.

However, while collaborative filtering and recommender systems have been demonstrated to be more effective than matching systems based on similarity and complementarity, they have also been demonstrated to be highly skewed to the preferences of early users and against racial minorities such as African Americans and Hispanic Americans which led to the rise of niche dating sites for those groups. In 2014, the Better Business Bureau's National Advertising Division criticized eHarmony's claims of creating a greater number of marriages and more durable and satisfying marriages than alternative dating websites, and in 2018, the Advertising Standards Authority banned eHarmony advertisements in the United Kingdom after the company was unable to provide any evidence to verify its marketing claims that its website's matching algorithm was scientifically proven to give its users a greater chance of finding long-term intimate relationships.

Data released by Tinder in 2018 showed that of the 1.6 billion swipes it recorded per day, only 26 million result in matches (a match rate of approximately only 1.63%), despite users logging into the app on average 11 times per day, with male user sessions averaging 7.2 minutes and female user sessions averaging 8.5 minutes (or 79.2 minutes and 93.5 minutes per day respectively). Also, a Tinder user interviewed anonymously in an article published in the December 2018 issue of The Atlantic estimated that only one in 10 of their matches actually resulted in an exchange of messages with the other user they were matched with, with another anonymous Tinder user saying, "Getting right-swiped is a good ego boost even if I have no intention of meeting someone."

In 2012, Karney, Reis, and their co-authors suggested that the availability of a large pool of potential partners "may lead online daters to objectify potential partners and might even undermine their willingness to commit to one of them." In October 2019, a Pew Research Center survey of 4,860 U.S. adults showed that 54 percent of U.S. adults believed that relationships formed through dating sites or apps were just as successful as those that began in person, 38 percent believed these relationships were less successful, while only 5 percent believed them to be more successful.

Noting the research of Karney, Reis, and their co-authors comparing online to offline dating and the research of communications studies scholar Nicole Ellison and her co-authors comparing online dating to comparative shopping, political scientist Robert D. Putnam cited the October 2019 Pew Research Center survey in the afterword to the second edition of Bowling Alone (2020) in expressing skepticism about whether online dating was leading to a greater number of long-term intimate relationships. The December 2018 Atlantic article noted that the percentage of U.S. adults living without spouses or partners rose to 42 percent by 2017 and to 61 percent among adults under the age of 35. Social psychologist David Buss has estimated that approximately 30 percent of the men on Tinder are married.

Buss has argued further "Apps like Tinder and OkCupid give people the impression that there are thousands or millions of potential mates out there. One dimension of this is the impact it has on men's psychology. When there is ... a perceived surplus of women, the whole mating system tends to shift towards short-term dating," and there is a feeling of disconnect when choosing future partners. In addition, the cognitive process identified by psychologist Barry Schwartz as the "paradox of choice" (also referred to as "choice overload" or "fear of a better option") was cited in an article published in The Atlantic that suggested that the appearance of an abundance of potential partners causes online daters to be less likely to choose a partner and be less satisfied with their choices of partners.

In March 2024, Marketing Science published the results of a field experiment using matching theory to study cross-side and same-side network effects on search and match behavior by 225,680 adult users of a global online dating platform who lived outside of major cities and were seeking an opposite-sex match. The study found that increases in "market size" (the number of platform users of the opposite sex) deterred participation and caused users of the opposite sex to become more selective, while increases in "competition size" (the number of platform users of the same sex) caused users to become less selective. However, the study did not conclude that increased market size deterred participation due to choice overload, because only users with online dating experience before the experiment were deterred by larger market size while users without pre-experiment experience were encouraged by larger market size. Instead, increased market size more likely deterred participation due to users anticipating higher search costs and their expectations about other users they anticipated finding on the platform.

In December 2024, Information Systems Research published a study of the search and matching history from 2011 to 2012 of 33,504 users of an online dating service in China without a recommender system but a feature that showed a short profile (a partial list of the attributes required by the service's user profiles) by default when the users that were studied (focal users) wished to send a message to another user to create a potential match (a candidate user). The study noted that while focal users could send a message after reading the long profiles of candidate users (with the complete list of attributes), the study found that focal users were more likely to receive a match after reading short profiles because the long profiles presented greater preference mismatches to the focal users that led them to send messages to candidate users with fewer mismatches but who were less likely to accept their proposed match.

Research on associations between online dating and divorce rates have found conflicting results. While research published in the Journal of Family and Economic Issues in September 2011 found no relationship between increased internet access and higher divorce rates in the United States, subsequent research published in the Review of Economics of the Household in June 2020 did find a correlation between increased access to broadband internet or mobile phones and higher divorce rates in rural counties and lower divorces rates in metropolitan areas in the United States. In June 2013, PNAS USA published a representative survey of 19,131 U.S. adults married between 2005 and 2012 that found that marriages that began online were slightly less likely to result in separation or divorce in comparison to marriages formed offline and were associated with slightly higher marital satisfaction.

In July 2014, Computers in Human Behavior published a study that found that after controlling for various economic, demographic, and psychological variables that state-by-state differences in the United States in Facebook and other social networking service (SNS) user account rates was correlated with higher divorce rates and diminished marriage quality. In October 2015, Cyberpsychology, Behavior, and Social Networking published a study of 371 undergraduate students at a university in the Midwestern United States that found that Facebook friend lists increased physical and emotional infidelities among couples, lowered relationship commitment, and diminished relationship quality due to psychological priming effects. In November 2016, the Journal of International Social Issues published a study that found that U.S. states with a higher Google Trends search volume index for Match.com in 2013 had fewer marriages in 2014, while U.S. states with higher search volume indices for Hinge, Bumble, Plenty of Fish, and Facebook in 2013 had a greater number of divorces in 2014.

In February 2019, Technological Forecasting and Social Change published a study examining associations between broadband internet access and divorce in China using provincial data from 2002 to 2014 that found that for every 1% increase in the number of broadband subscribers the number of divorces grew by 0.008%. In December 2020, PLOS One published a study on online dating in Switzerland that found that couples formed through online dating had stronger cohabiting intentions than those formed offline and no differences in relationship satisfaction. In January 2024, Computers in Human Behavior published a survey of 923 married U.S. adults where roughly half of the subjects met their spouses online that found evidence for an "online dating effect" where online daters reported less satisfying and durable marriages, but the researchers suggested that the differences could be explained by societal marginalization and geographic distance.

=== Online matchmaking services ===
In 2008, a variation of the online dating model emerged in the form of introduction sites, where members have to search and contact other members, who introduce them to other members whom they deem compatible. Introduction sites differ from the traditional online dating model, and attracted many users and significant investor interest.

In China, the number of separations per a thousand couples doubled, from 1.46 in 2006 to about three in 2016, while the number of actual divorces continues to rise, according to the Ministry of Civil Affairs. Demand for online dating services among divorcees keeps growing, especially in the large cities such as Beijing, Shanghai, Shenzhen and Guangzhou. In addition, more and more people are expected to use online dating and matchmaking services as China continues to urbanize in the late 2010s and 2020s.

== Reception ==
Opinions and usage of online dating services also differ widely. A 2005 study of data collected by the Pew Internet & American Life Project found that individuals are more likely to use an online dating service if they use the Internet for a greater number of tasks, and less likely to use such a service if they are trusting of others.

Attitudes towards online dating improved visibly between 2005 and 2015, the Pew Research Center found. In particular, the number of people who thought that online dating was a good way to meet people rose from 44% in 2005 to 59%. Although only a negligible number of people dated online in 2005, that rose to 11% in 2013 and then 15% in 2015. In particular, the number of American adults who had used an online dating site went from 9% in 2013 to 12% in 2015 while those who used an online dating software application on their mobile phones jumped from 3% to 9% during the same period. This increase was driven mainly by people aged 18 to 24, for whom usage almost tripled. At the same time, usage among those between the ages of 55 and 64 doubled.

According to a 2015 study by the Pew Research Center, people who had used online dating services had a higher opinion of such services than those who had not. 80% of the users said that online dating sites are a good way to meet potential partners.

In 2016, Consumer Reports surveyed approximately 115,000 online dating service subscribers across multiple platforms and found that while 44 percent of survey respondents stated that usage of online dating services led to a serious long-term intimate relationship or marriage, a subset of approximately 9,600 subscribers that had used at least one online dating service within the previous two years rated satisfaction with the services they used lower than Consumer Reports surveys of consumer satisfaction with technical support services and rated satisfaction with free online dating services as slightly more satisfactory than services with paid subscriptions.

In the October 2019 Pew Research Center survey, 57% of survey respondents who had used online dating said their experiences on the platforms was very or somewhat positive while 42% said their experiences were very or somewhat negative, and 76% of survey respondents felt that online dating has had neither a positive or negative effect on dating and relationships or a mostly negative effect while 22% felt that online dating has had a mostly positive effect.

In a July 2022 survey of 6,034 U.S. adults conducted by the Pew Research Center, 53% of survey respondents who had used online dating said their experiences on the platforms were either very or somewhat positive while 46% said their experiences were either very or somewhat negative, 54% of all survey respondents said they believed that dating apps either made no difference in finding a partner or spouse or made doing so harder while 42% said they believed that dating apps made finding a partner or spouse easier, and 80% of survey respondents felt that online dating has had neither a positive or negative effect on dating and relationships or a mostly negative effect while 18% felt that online dating has had a mostly positive effect.

=== Trust and safety issues ===
As online dating services are not required to routinely conduct background checks on members, it is possible for profile information to be misrepresented or falsified. Also, there may be users on dating services that have illicit intentions (i.e. date rape, procurement, etc.).

In response to concerns about non-consensual sexually explicit messages on dating platforms, some services have introduced consent-based content filters. For example, Hily's "Consent Guard" uses machine learning to detect explicit messages and images and requires consent from both users before they are delivered.

OKCupid once introduced a real name policy, but that was later taken removed due to unpopularity with its users.

Only some online dating services are providing important safety information such as STD status of its users or other infectious diseases, but many do not.

Some online dating services which are popular amongst members of queer communities are sometimes used by people as a means of meeting these audiences for the purpose of gaybashing or trans bashing.

A form of misrepresentation is that members may lie about their height, weight, age, or marital status in an attempt to market or brand themselves in a particular way. Users may also carefully manipulate profiles as a form of impression management. Online daters have raised concerns about ghosting, the practice of ceasing all communication with a person without explaining why. Ghosting appears to be becoming more common. Various explanations have been suggested, but social media is often blamed, as are dating apps and the relative anonymity and isolation in modern-day dating and hookup culture, which make it easier to behave poorly with few social repercussions.

Online dating site members may try to balance an accurate representation with maintaining their image in a desirable way. One study found that nine out of ten participants had lied on at least one attribute, though lies were often slight; weight was the most lied about attribute, and age was the least lied about. Furthermore, knowing a large amount of superficial information about a potential partner's interests may lead to a false sense of security when meeting up with a new person. Gross misrepresentation may be less likely on matrimonials sites than on casual dating sites.

Some profiles may not even represent real humans but rather they may be fake "bait profiles" placed online by site owners to attract new paying members, or "spam profiles" created by advertisers to market services and products.

Opinions on regarding the safety of online dating are mixed. Over 50% of research participants in a 2011 study did not view online dating as a dangerous activity, whereas 43% thought that online dating involved risk. Date rape is a form of acquaintance rape and dating violence. The two phrases are often used interchangeably, but date rape specifically refers to a rape in which there has been some sort of romantic or potentially sexual relationship between the two parties. Acquaintance rape also includes rapes in which the victim and perpetrator have been in a non-romantic, non-sexual relationship, for example as co-workers or neighbors. According to the United States Bureau of Justice Statistics (BJS), date rapes are among the most common forms of rape cases. Date rape most commonly takes place among college students when alcohol is involved or date rape drugs are taken. One of the most targeted groups are women between the ages of 16 and 24.

In the October 2019 Pew Research Center survey, 53% of survey respondents said that they believed that dating apps were a very or somewhat safe way to meet potential partners while 46% believed they were a not too safe or not at all safe way to do so, and 50% online dating respondents said that they believed that scam accounts were common. In the July 2022 Pew Research Center survey, 49% of survey respondents said that they believed that dating apps were a not too safe or not at all safe way to meet potential partners while 48% believed they were a very or somewhat safe way to do so, and 52% online dating respondents said that they believed that scam accounts were common.

In response to these issues, over 120 Facebook groups named Are We Dating The Same Guy? were created where women share red flags about men and check that he is not dating another person. It is done by taking screenshots of a man's dating profile and posting it onto her city's designated Facebook group, asking "any tea?". Other users in the group will then share information about the man and share warnings. The groups are moderated by volunteers, and have been described as a feminist group.

Romance scams originating on dating platforms have become a significant category of internet-enabled fraud. The Federal Bureau of Investigation's Internet Crime Complaint Center recorded 17,910 complaints of romance scams in 2024, with reported losses of approximately $672 million, as part of a record $16.6 billion in total internet-crime losses for the year. Older adults bore a disproportionate share of these losses, with the FBI reporting that victims aged 60 and over lost a combined $4.9 billion across all fraud types in 2024, an annual increase of 43%.

=== Billing complaints ===
Online subscription-based services can suffer from complaints about billing practices. Some online dating service providers may have fraudulent membership fees or credit card charges. Some sites do not allow members to preview available profiles before paying a subscription fee. Furthermore, different functionalities may be offered to members who have paid or not paid for subscriptions, resulting in some confusion around who can view or contact whom.

Consolidation within the online dating industry has led to different newspapers and magazines now advertising the same website database under different names. In the UK, for example, Time Out ("London Dating"), The Times ("Encounters"), and The Daily Telegraph ("Kindred Spirits"), all offer differently named portals to the same service—meaning that a person who subscribes through more than one publication has unwittingly paid more than once for access to the same service.

=== Imbalanced gender ratios ===
Little is known about the sex ratio controlled for age. eHarmony's membership is about 57% female and 43% male, whereas the ratio at Match.com is about the reverse of that. On specialty niche websites where the primary demographic is male, there is typically a very unbalanced ratio of male to female or female to male. As of June 2015, 62% of Tinder users were male and 38% were female.

Studies have suggested that men are far more likely to send messages on dating sites than women. In addition, men tend to message the most attractive women regardless of their own attractiveness. This leads to the most attractive women on these sites receiving an overwhelming number of messages, which can in some cases result in them leaving the site.

There is some evidence that there may be differences in how women online rate male attractiveness as opposed to how men rate female attractiveness. The distribution of ratings given by men of female attractiveness appears to be the normal distribution, while ratings of men given by women is highly skewed, with 80% of men rated as below average.

=== Allegations of discrimination ===
Gay rights groups have complained that certain websites that restrict their dating services to heterosexual couples are discriminating against homosexuals. Homosexual customers of the popular eHarmony dating website have made many attempts to litigate discriminatory practices. eHarmony was sued in 2007 by a lesbian claiming that "[s]uch outright discrimination is hurtful and disappointing for a business open to the public in this day and age." In light of discrimination by sexual orientation by dating websites, some services such as GayDar.net and Chemistry.com cater more to homosexual dating.

=== Attention inequality ===
Online dating shows attention inequality, where a small percentage of users receive most of the matches. Disclosure of number of matches received by other users was found to improve the supply and demand balance.

== Lawsuits filed against online dating services ==
A 2011 class action lawsuit alleged Match.com failed to remove inactive profiles, did not accurately disclose the number of active members, and does not police its site for fake profiles; the inclusion of expired and spam profiles as valid served to both artificially inflate the total number of profiles and camouflage a skewed gender ratio in which active users were disproportionately single males. The suit claimed up to 60 percent were inactive profiles, fake or fraudulent users. Some of the spam profiles were alleged to be using images of porn actresses, models, or people from other dating sites. Former employees alleged Match routinely and intentionally over-represented the number of active members on the website and a huge percentage were not real members but 'filler profiles'.

A 2012 class action against Successful Match ended with a November 2014 California jury award of $1.4 million in compensatory damages and $15 million in punitive damages. SuccessfulMatch operated a dating site for people with STDs, PositiveSingles, which it advertised as offering a "fully anonymous profile" which is "100% confidential". The company failed to disclose that it was placing those same profiles on a long list of affiliate site domains such as GayPozDating.com, AIDSDate.com, HerpesInMouth.com, ChristianSafeHaven.com, MeetBlackPOZ.com, HIVGayMen.com, STDHookup.com, BlackPoz.com, and PositivelyKinky.com. This falsely implied that those users were black, Christian, gay, HIV-positive or members of other groups with which the registered members did not identify. The jury found PositiveSingles guilty of fraud, malice, and oppression as the plaintiffs' race, sexual orientation, HIV status, and religion were misrepresented by exporting each dating profile to niche sites associated with each trait.

In 2013, a former employee sued adultery website Ashley Madison claiming repetitive strain injuries as creating 1000 fake profiles in one three week span "required an enormous amount of keyboarding" which caused the worker to develop severe pain in her wrists and forearms. AshleyMadison's parent company, Avid Life Media, countersued in 2014, alleging the worker kept confidential documents, including copies of her "work product and training materials". The firm claimed the fake profiles were for "quality assurance testing" to test a new Brazilian version of the site for "consistency and reliability".

In January 2014, an already-married Facebook user attempting to close a pop-up advertisement for Zoosk.com found that one click instead copied personal info from her Facebook profile to create an unwanted online profile seeking a mate, leading to a flood of unexpected responses from amorous single males.

In 2014, It's Just Lunch International was the target of a New York class action alleging unjust enrichment as IJL staff relied on a uniform, misleading script which informed prospective customers during initial interviews that IJL already had at least two matches in mind for those customers' first dates regardless of whether or not that was true.

In 2014, the US Federal Trade Commission fined UK-based JDI Dating (a group of 18 websites, including Cupidswand.com and FlirtCrowd.com) over US$600000, finding that "the defendants offered a free plan that allowed users to set up a profile with personal information and photos. As soon as a new user set up a free profile, he or she began to receive messages that appeared to be from other members living nearby, expressing romantic interest or a desire to meet. However, users were unable to respond to these messages without upgrading to a paid membership ... [t]he messages were almost always from fake, computer-generated profiles — 'Virtual Cupids' — created by the defendants, with photos and information designed to closely mimic the profiles of real people." The FTC also found that paid memberships were being renewed without client authorisation.

On June 30, 2014, co-founder and former marketing vice president of Tinder, Whitney Wolfe, filed a sexual harassment and sex discrimination suit in Los Angeles County Superior Court against IAC-owned Match Group, the parent company of Tinder. The lawsuit alleged that her fellow executives and co-founders Rad and Mateen had engaged in discrimination, sexual harassment, and retaliation against her, while Tinder's corporate supervisor, IAC's Sam Yagan, did nothing. IAC suspended CMO Mateen from his position pending an ongoing investigation, and stated that it "acknowledges that Mateen sent private messages containing 'inappropriate content,' but it believes Mateen, Rad and the company are innocent of the allegations". In December 2018, The Verge reported that Tinder had dismissed Rosette Pambakian, the company's vice president of marketing and communication who had accused Tinder's former CEO Greg Blatt of sexual assault, along with several other employees who were part of the group of Tinder employees who had previously sued the Match Group for $2 billion.

In 2017 Darlene Daggett, QVC's president for U.S. commerce from 2002 to 2007, filed a lawsuit against matchmaking agency Kelleher International. The company, owned by Amber Kelleher-Andrews agreed to settle within hours of Daggett filing the lawsuit. Neither talked about the case, citing a non-disclosure agreement, but Daggett's lawsuit gives plenty of detail about her grievances with the California-based company. 'Due to her senior level position in a local firm, [she] felt that social dating sites did not provide her with the degree of screening and privacy she was looking for,' the lawsuit states. She opted in for the company's most expensive plan, the $150,000 CEO level, which guaranteed her matches from around the world and the personal attention of Kelleher-Andrews. But Daggett says she did not get what she paid for. Instead, she suffered brief romantic entanglements with increasingly disastrous men.

== Government regulation ==
U.S. government regulation of dating services began with the International Marriage Broker Regulation Act (IMBRA) which took effect in March 2007 after a federal judge in Georgia upheld a challenge from the dating site European Connections. The law requires dating services meeting specific criteria—including having as their primary business to connect U.S. citizens/residents with foreign nationals—to conduct, among other procedures, sex offender checks on U.S. customers before contact details can be provided to the non-U.S. citizen. In 2008, the state of New Jersey passed a law which requires the sites to disclose whether they perform background checks.

In the People's Republic of China, using a transnational matchmaking agency involving a monetary transaction is illegal. The Philippines prohibits the business of organizing or facilitating marriages between Filipinas and foreign men under the Republic Act 6955 (the Anti-Mail-Order Bride Law) of June 13, 1990; this law is routinely circumvented by basing mail-order bride websites outside the country.

Singapore's Social Development Network is the governmental organization facilitating dating activities in the country. Singapore's government has actively acted as a matchmaker for singles for the past few decades, and thus only 4% of Singaporeans have ever used an online dating service, despite the country's high rate of internet penetration.

In December 2010, a New York State Law called the "Internet Dating Safety Act" (S5180-A) went into effect that requires online dating sites with customers in New York State to warn users not to disclose personal information to people they do not know.

In the United Kingdom, Ofcom formally classified dating apps as "user-to-user" services under the Online Safety Act 2023 in guidance issued in January 2025. From July 2025, services such as Tinder, Bumble, Hinge and Grindr were required to implement what Ofcom termed "highly effective age assurance", with acceptable methods including photo-identification checks, facial-age estimation, credit-card verification and open-banking data. Non-compliance carries potential fines of up to 10% of global revenue or £18 million, whichever is greater.

In the European Union, the Digital Services Act, which entered into force for all online platforms in February 2024, applies to dating apps as it does to other user-to-user services. Guidelines published by the European Commission in July 2025 under Article 28(1) of the Act set expectations around age assurance, safer-by-default design, the labelling of commercial content and content-moderation systems aimed at protecting minors.

Australia, following its Online Safety Act 2021, developed an age-verification roadmap through 2023 and 2024 that resulted in phased obligations for dating services taking effect during 2025 and 2026. The Australian framework is technology-neutral, requiring providers to demonstrate that their chosen verification method is effective, privacy-preserving and accessible rather than mandating a single technique.

== See also ==
- Comparison of online dating websites
- FOSTA-SESTA
- List of social networking services
- Matrimonial website
- Mobile dating
- Online dating applications
- Online identity
- Timeline of online dating services
- Burned Haystack Dating Method
- Sexual selection in humans
- Dating agency
- VIDA Select
