= Transnational marriage =

Marriage between two people from different countries

A transnational marriage or international marriage is a marriage between two people from different countries or nationalities. It can either be a marriage between two people of the same ethnicity from two countries living in the same country, or marriage between two people from two countries of different ethnicities.

== History ==
Transnational marriage has been attested since ancient times, often in instances where royal families sought to form alliances with one another. For example, Hermodike I (c. 800 BC) and Hermodike II (c. 600BC), Greek princesses from the house of Agamemnon, married kings from Phrygia. These unions resulted in the introduction of ground-breaking technology to the Ancient Greeks. Hermodike the First's marriage introduced Greece to the Phoenecian written script while Hermodike the Second's marriage introduced Greece to the use of coinage (to use a token currency, where the value is guaranteed by the state). Both inventions were rapidly adopted by surrounding nations through trade and cooperation and have been of fundamental benefit to the progress of civilization.

More recently, transnational marriages have resulted from increasing globalization. Globalization has resulted in increased labour migration, increased communication, and more situations where foreigners come into contact with one another. Transnational marriage is increasingly common in areas where class and tribal separations are becoming less strict.

There are many barriers and restrictions to cross-cultural, inter-tribal, or interracial marriages, however, particularly transnational marriages. People tend to marry those similar to them, with cultures accepting and some laws permitting marriage between first cousins. Surprisingly, international arranged marriages between cousins (and other relatives) occur more often in countries with migration and family reunification policies. This form of transnational marriage is between nations but within cultures, allowing ethnic communities to remain viable even when far from their homelands.

In the United States, data on intermarriage rates of immigrants has been collected since the early 20th century. Sociologist Julius Drachsler collected data on 100,00 marriages in New York City between 1908 and 1912. He found that less than one in ten foreign-born grooms married a bride born in America to American-born parents. In 2007, about one in four married immigrants had a spouse born in the United States. There are higher intermarriage rates for immigrants from more developed nations, suggesting greater capacity for cultural assimilation.

== Historical and religious attitudes ==
According to the biblical account, Abraham's God instructed the Israelites to avoid marrying individuals from the seven nations inhabiting the land of Canaan. This was due to the fear that such unions would lead them to worship the gods of those nations.

Intermarriage with other nations was permissible. There are several instances of transnational marriages in the Bible, such as Joseph being given an Egyptian wife by Pharaoh, Rahab, the prostitute from Jericho, marrying Salmon - becoming an ancestor of Christ, Ruth the Moabite married Boaz - also becoming an ancestor of Christ, and King Solomon marrying Pharaoh's daughter. King Solomon was punished by God for facilitating his wives' worship of their gods in Israel and then worshipping alongside them. Samson married a Philistine. The book of Ezra tells the Jewish exiles to separate from the foreign wives they had married in Babylon. Moses' sister, Miriam, criticizes him for marrying a Cushite but is then cursed by God because of her criticism.

The Laws of Manu, a religious document for the Indo-Aryan Brahmins invading India, speaks of how to keep oneself clean but also intermarry with the indigenous peoples in order to create a caste system. A Nepali anthropologist writes on how a Brahmin man might marry four wives of different castes, and keep all the eating and living quarters of his different caste wives and children separate. His children and grandchildren, born to women of lower castes, will have even lower status and not be taught the laws. The only social mobility is downward.

A distinct aspect of intermarriage or cross-cultural unions pertains to those who choose to marry their cousins. They engage in such marriages to maintain social and economic cohesion within their family. Recently, this practice has become technically transnational due to differences in citizenship. An example of transnational marriage that kept the family together was among European royalty. Queen Victoria had grandchildren in many European states, connecting royal dynasties, and she was referred to as the "grandmother of Europe." More recent examples derive from mass migration from the less developed regions of the world to the more developed regions, helped by the policies of family reunification. A fairly common practice among South Asian immigrants to the UK or USA is to have arranged marriages to someone back "home" in order to keep the culture and traditions within their family.

== Modern attitudes ==
Transnational marriage has become a controversial topic in some areas due to the increase in its prevalence. Host countries have implemented family reunification policies, which have led to concerns regarding cultural assimilation. Marrying someone from their home country enables immigrants to preserve their cultural heritage and identity, which some believe is a hindrance to assimilation. Moreover, there are concerns about the authenticity of some transnational marriages. Some are suspicious that non-citizen spouses may use the marriage as a means to obtain legal status in the host country. Another significant issue is the separation of families due to legal issues such as deportation or detention of one spouse. There are various legal challenges associated with transnational marriages, including the right to remain in the same country.

=== International marriages and Internet ===
The Internet has contributed over the last decades to the increase of transnational marriages and registered partnerships of international couples.

Internet based services, be they marriage agencies or mail-order bride sites specialized in international weddings and marriages can be regrouped in two main categories:

a) Country-specific sites and applications, where persons from other countries are looking for partners from a particular country covered by the service. For instance, there are several sites which allows people to order brides from Eastern Europe (Countries like Ukraine, Moldova), Russia, South East Asia and Latin America. These sites are popular among grooms having a profound affinity with a particular country, with its culture and its language or happened to like how people, especially women, from these countries look.

b) Non-country-specific sites where people have a chance to meet persons from various countries.

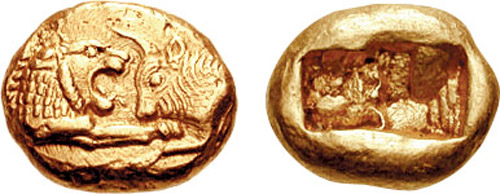
Gold croeseid of Croesus c.550 BC, depicting the Lydian lion and Greek bull - partly in recognition of transnational parentage.

== Debate ==
There is some debate about whether national laws should discourage or encourage transnational marriage. Currently, it can be legally difficult to have a transnational marriage. There are many barriers, for example in Indonesia it can be very difficult for the married couple if the husband is not Indonesian. As a result of increasing transnational marriage, policymakers in various countries are starting to consider whether they should discourage or encourage transnational marriage.

The grounds given for discouraging transnational marriage are that:

- False marriages occur to gain citizenship or conduct human trafficking.
- The marriages are cross-cultural and thus children or spouses may not be as loyal or patriotic to the new country.
- There is a lack of assimilation and creation of ghettos if second and third generation immigrants are still marrying persons from the country of their ancestors.

The grounds given for encouraging transnational marriage are that:

- Transnational marriage reconnects extended families or even persons of similar backgrounds that are living all over the globe.
- In a more and more globalized world, they contribute increasing cultural and professional diversity and creativity.
- It helps relations between countries by strengthening trade and contact, or in case of war, enables one country to know more about the other (case of Kibei or Japanese-Americans during WWII).
- People are increasingly marrying across national boundaries and harsh laws just tear families apart.

== By country ==
=== Pakistan, Afghanistan ===
Frequent among Pashtun and Baloch tribes near the Durand Line where marriage between transborder corresponding cultures is frequent. The straddling of people between the border has been a contentious ongoing issue between the two countries.

=== Japan ===
Approximately 2.25% of Japan's residents are foreigners, many of whom have married with Japanese nationals as a result of spending time living and working in Japan.

=== Switzerland ===
When it comes to marriage, foreigners in the country do not face too many legal restrictions. Both residents and non-residents in Switzerland can get married with relative ease.

=== United States ===
In the United States federal law, International Marriage Broker Regulation Act regulates international marriage, primarily to restrict misuse of the institution of marriage to immigrate to the country.

=== Singapore ===
It's common to see Chinese marrying Indians, resulting in a new ethnic culture called Chindians. however, the children of said union reported to face bullying and depression as they don't know to which culture they should lean into.

== See also ==
- Inequality within immigrant families in the United States
- International child abduction
- Interfaith marriage
- Interracial marriage
- Interethnic marriage
- Interdenominational marriage
- Inter-caste marriage
- Gay marriage
- Mail-order bride
- Naturalization
