= Jack Reeves =

American serial killer (born 1940)

- Born: Jack Wayne Reeves; June 20, 1940 (age 86); Wichita Falls, Texas, U.S.
- Convictions: Murder (2 counts); Manslaughter
- Penalty: 99 years imprisonment

Details
- Victims: 3-4
- Span of crimes: 1967–1994
- Country: Italy and the United States
- State: Texas
- Imprisoned at: Wallace Pack Unit

Jack Wayne Reeves (born June 20, 1940) is a convicted murderer serving a 99-year prison sentence for killing his second and fourth wives.

== Early life ==
Reeves was born in Wichita Falls, Texas, on June 20, 1940. He retired from the Army in 1985 as a master sergeant.

== First wife ==
Reeves' first marriage was at 18 to a 15-year-old. The marriage was annulled in 1960.

== Manslaughter ==
In 1967, while stationed with his second wife in Italy, Reeves killed a man and served four months in prison for manslaughter. After his release, the couple returned to the U.S. and settled in Copperas Cove, Texas.

== Second wife ==
In 1961, Reeves married his second wife, Sharon Vaughn, and they were together for 18 years. They had two sons, Ricky and Randall, while in Italy. In 1977, Sharon pursued an affair with John Behneman. She filed for divorce in February 1978 while Reeves was stationed in South Korea. On July 20, 1978, a week after divorcing Reeves, she died of a shotgun wound to her chest that was originally believed to be self-inflicted. The case was re-examined in 1994 and it was determined that she was murdered. The prosecution demonstrated in court how difficult it would have been for her to shoot herself. A blood spatter expert concluded that Sharon wore a bra and underwear at the time of her death, but when her body was found, she was naked. She was 34.

== Third wife ==
Reeves married Myeong-hi Chong on December 31, 1980, in South Korea. She drowned in Lake Whitney in Texas in 1986. Her family said Myeong-hi was unable to swim and had a strong aversion to water. Bruises on her face made her sister suspicious and she requested an autopsy. Reeves had Myeong-Hi cremated.

== Fourth wife ==
Reeves met his fourth wife, Emelita Villa, through a mail-order bride service when she was 18. Reeves was 28 years her senior. Emelita was reportedly reluctant to marry him, but felt obligated due to monthly payments he sent to her family in the Philippines. When she became pregnant, Reeves sent her back to her family as he believed he was not the father. He changed his mind when she sent him a photograph of their son. She was last seen alive on October 11, 1994. She disappeared shortly after telling friends of her intent to divorce Reeves. In October 1995, her remains were found by a hunter in a shallow grave near Lake Whitney, where Reeves' third wife drowned eight years before.

== Investigation and arrest ==
Emelita's friend reported her missing. Police grew suspicious when they found out Reeves had two dead wives, both of whom died after making plans to leave Reeves and complaining to friends of mistreatment by him. He was arrested on March 21, 1995, for the murder of his second wife and bail was set at $500,000.

== Trial ==
He was convicted on January 3, 1996, for the 1978 murder of Sharon Reeves and received a 35-year prison sentence. On August 20, 1996, he was convicted of murdering Emelita Reeves and sentenced to an additional 99 years. Reeves appealed both convictions but was rejected. His sentences are being served concurrently. He was eligible for parole in 2026. His parole application in 2026 was rejected, and he will be eligible again in 2031.

== Media coverage ==
The case was covered in episodes of Exhumed, Forensic Files and 'Mail Order Murder' by Patricia Springer.

== See also ==
- List of serial killers in the United States
