= Inequality within immigrant families in the United States =

Inequality within immigrant families in the United States are usually due to variations of legal status, employment and education opportunities, cultural differences, and assimilation within the same immigrant family. Members of the same immigrant family often have differing access to resources in the United States. Much literature focuses on inequality between families, but inequality often exists within families as well. Though within-family inequality is not unique to immigrant families, the processes of migration and assimilation into American society provide new channels through which such inequality may emerge.

== Legal status ==
Immigrants to the United States vary widely in terms of their citizenship status. Some immigrants may lack documentation altogether. An individual's legal status in the United States determines many of the resources available to him or her. Legal status can thus provide the basis for many inequalities in the home.

=== Mixed-status families ===
The Citizenship Clause of the Fourteenth Amendment to the United States Constitution guarantees citizenship status to anyone born on United States soil "and subject to the jurisdiction thereof". This means that, regardless of parents' citizenship status, their children who are born in the United States are full citizens and are eligible for the rights and privileges that such status confers; this is called a mixed immigrant status family. Thus, within mixed-status families are a range of documentation patterns involving siblings: some born in the U.S. with birthright citizenship, some in the process of attempting to obtain documentation, and some fully undocumented.

U.S. immigration policies shape the opportunities for 16.6 million mixed immigrant families. The experiences of mixed immigrant status families need to be in sharper focus, especially the effects on children growing up in these families. There are an estimated 5.5 million children with unauthorized immigrant parents, about three-quarters of whom are U.S. born citizens. The nature of immigration policy dehumanizes individuals in mixed status families through practices that threat and harm, such as deportation procedures, which is when a migrant is formally removed from the United States and is banned from reentering. Immigration policies and practices do not only affect the undocumented population itself. However, U.S. born children growing up in families where there are undocumented members living are negatively impacted by these policies.

Children living in mixed immigration status households live with fear of deportation threats of parents or themselves. They often feel scared, sad and worried about possible separation. This can be traumatic and have negative effects on the children's well-being. As a result, children may interpret their reality as depriving and cruel. They may process their experiences with a consciousness that mirrors that of their undocumented parents, even though many are U.S. born citizens with all of the benefits rights, and privileges that U.S. citizenship carries.

Immigrant children—defined as those children under age eighteen who are either foreign-born or U.S.-born to immigrant parents—now account for one-fourth of the nation's 75 million children. By 2050 they are projected to make up one-third of more than 100 million U.S. children. This highlights that children of immigrants in mixed status families are growing in the United States. Therefore, it is of high importance to understand their experiences in this country and the impact that a mixed status has on the children growing up in these families facing unique needs and challenges. Mixed immigrant families' rights are being violated. When there is family separation through immigration practices, children in mixed status household are denied the right to grow up with their families. They are dehumanized, based on status of their parents.

Legal status can thus lead to a restructuring of traditional family roles. Family members who may have previously been the primary breadwinners in the country of origin may be unable to find gainful employment due to their undocumented status. Family members who are legal citizens and thus have access to a wider range of employment opportunities may therefore hold a greater measure of power within the family. When these family members are children, who might traditionally be expected to defer to their elders, such an imbalance in legal status may create an upheaval in the traditional familial relations.

Such unequal access to resources can create a power imbalance between family members who have citizenship status and those who do not. An individual's legal status may be used to keep him or her subjugated within the home and, in extreme cases, may prevent him or her from leaving an abusive situation.

=== Access to resources ===
Individuals who hold legal status in the United States enjoy many advantages over those who do not. Differences in legal status are also associated with differing access to various resources such as employment opportunities, as well as a host of social benefits. In addition, children in mixed-status families are at-risk and precisely the types of clients targeted by many social services, social workers, and public health organizations. For example, Hispanics in general are less likely to be insured, within the pan-ethnic Hispanic population, immigrants without legal authorization are less likely to have employer coverage and are currently excluded from purchasing coverage from the federal exchange in the Affordable Care Act.

==== Employment opportunities ====
Even when undocumented individuals are employed, their positions are often precarious. Approximately 40% of immigrant workers in low-wage jobs are undocumented. A lack of formal documentation means that many of these individuals must find work in the informal economy where there is a lack of protection for worker rights. Undocumented workers may have difficulty obtaining justice in cases of mistreatment since employers can easily threaten them with deportation. This leaves these immigrant workers vulnerable to exploitation. Exploitation may take many forms, one of these being wage theft. While there are regulations to protect the rights of workers, such as laws that cover private domestic work, these policies are often underutilized since workers may be unaware of their existence. Individuals who lack formal documentation may also feel less empowered to seek legal recourse because of fear of having their undocumented status made known.

Family members with legal status are more likely to have access to jobs with higher pay and benefits. Second generation immigrants in the United States, who are most likely full citizens, tend to have higher earnings and are less likely to be in poverty than first generation immigrants, some of whom lack formal legal status. Thus, the unequal access to employment opportunities can generate inequality among family members of different legal statuses.

==== Social benefits ====
Citizens of the United States are entitled to a host of social benefits. Government programs such as Food Stamps and Medicaid can provide support for low-income families. However, children who are U.S. citizens may not always be able to fully enjoy these benefits. Immigrant parents with limited English language ability may be unaware they are eligible for such benefits, or may not know how to take advantage of social welfare programs. Even legal non-citizens may find that their access to social supports is restricted due to welfare reforms. In addition, parents who are undocumented may be afraid to deal with government agencies, even if their citizen children are eligible for such assistance programs. When there is risk of deportation, it affects the likelihood of a mixed-status mother's use social services. The anti-immigrant sentiment increases this and then would deter mixed-status mothers not to participate in government programs which their U.S. born children are eligible to receive.

==== Health care ====
Undocumented immigrants in mixed status families tend to work in jobs that do not provide employee based health insurance and/or employed in occupations that pay off the books. Moreover, we can also expect that poor noncitizen children whose parents lack job-based coverage have lower rates of participation than poor citizen children of U.S. citizens. The lack of insurance for citizen children in mixed-status families means that these children are less likely to receive timely care for acute conditions, and less likely to have their chronic conditions diagnosed and appropriately managed.

== Gender ==
Inequality in the family may occur along gender lines. This is not an issue unique to immigrant families. In many cultures around the world, men have traditionally held more power than women. Among families in the United States alone, gender inequality often exists, which is evident in the unequal sharing of household labor. The process of immigration entails a move to a new country, whose culture may have values that differ greatly from those of the home culture. In this transition from one geographical and social context to another, new forms of gender inequality can arise.

=== Shifts in gender roles ===
The United States prides itself on being a society that supports gender equality. While, in reality, much gender inequality persists, there are indeed laws in place to protect the equal rights of everyone, regardless of gender. Depending on the home country, U.S. society may contain a much higher level of gender equality than immigrants are accustomed to, particularly if immigrants come from a traditionally patriarchal society. The disparity in gender norms between different cultures may cause gender roles in the family to shift.

Immigrants may find that they are a part of a lower socioeconomic status group in the United States than they were in their home country. Immigration research shows that it is rarely the poorest citizens of the sending countries that immigrate to the United States, simply because they cannot afford the associated costs. This is particularly true when they come from countries where the cost of living is not as high as in the United States. Individuals who may have held professional occupations in their country of origin may find themselves in low-paying jobs if their certifications are not recognized by the United States. When families migrate to the United States from a country with a patriarchal society, men in particular may experience a loss of status.

While women are also affected by the family's loss of status, they may simultaneously experience a boost in their own status relative to men because of the greater gender equality present in American society. Men, who may have been accustomed to filling the role of sole "breadwinner" in their home country may find themselves unable to do so in the United States. This is due both to restricted access to jobs and to prevalence of new immigrants in the low-wage sector. Immigrants in these jobs are unlikely to be able to support their entire families solely on their earnings. The increase in the number of female-dominated industries in the United States means that there are often more employment options for women in the low-wage sector than for men. If women begin to take a more active role in financially providing for their family, this is generally accompanied by enhanced status within the family.

=== Domestic violence ===
While the rate of domestic violence among immigrant groups does not differ from that of the general population, immigrant victims of domestic violence may face additional challenges. While victims can be of either gender, women may be especially vulnerable. The process of immigrating to another country and adjusting to American culture can be stressful, increasing the likelihood of domestic violence. Factors such as limited English language ability, legal status, and lack of social ties may create additional barriers for those trying to escape such situations. Even when a woman does have access to social services that could help her escape an abusive situation, cultural norms may make it difficult for her to leave. If a woman decides to leave an abusive spouse she may run the risk of social ostracism and of bringing shame to her family. Thus, a woman may choose to stay and suffer abuse rather than face the social consequences of leaving her husband.

On the other hand, some individuals may actually find it easier to escape situations of abuse in the United States than they would have in their countries of origin. Among some immigrants there is much criticism of the way in which women in particular have been changed by American culture. Women may be seen as too Americanized because of the way they dress or their lack of deference to men. The general support for gender equality within American society can undermine traditional power hierarchies within the family in which men had control over the actions of women. One of the ways that such power is undermined is through the presence of laws against domestic violence. In some patriarchal societies, husbands may have complete control over their wives, including control over their bodies. U.S. laws do not support this sort of arrangement and women who are aware of their rights can utilize formal legal institutions to combat such gender imbalances within the family. The ability of government authorities to intervene in the realm of the family can undermine the traditional power balance and leave men feeling dispossessed.

=== Relationships across national borders ===
Families do not always immigrate as one unit. Given the various legal and economical factors associated with transnational migration, certain family members may find it easier to immigrate to the United States than others. In other cases, individuals may immigrate to the United States as an employment strategy, with no intention of permanently relocating their family to the U.S. The distribution of family members across national borders can generate unique forms of inequality within the families of immigrants.

==== Global relationships as a strategy to uphold gender roles ====
Some immigrants, particularly those from cultures in which women are subordinate to men, may express disapproval about the influence of American culture on girls and women. Men in particular may perceive women from their own cultural heritage who have assimilated into American society as too "independent" and thus incompatible with the traditional family structures that such men may wish to uphold. This may cause men to seek out spouses from their home countries, believing these women will be more willing to take on the traditional household duties of a wife. When these women come to the United States they may experience isolation, particularly if they do not have family members or friends already in the U.S. In such instances, men often control women's access to outside resources and support systems, creating a power imbalance within the home. In instances of domestic violence, this isolation may make it difficult for women to find the help they need.

==== Transnational families ====
Migration is often used as an employment strategy. Although many individuals choose to migrate permanently to another country, others may migrate on a more temporary basis or do so seasonally. When families do not all migrate together, they must negotiate family relationships across national borders. Which family members migrate and which stay behind can be important determinants of how inequality may manifest itself in these transnational families. Among families from Latin American countries, it is often the case that men will travel abroad to work. This means that the women in these families do the bulk of the day-to-day caring for the family.

In more recent years, scholars have noted a shift in the demographics of migrant workers. Particularly in Asian countries, but also in Latin American countries, a growing number of women are traveling abroad for jobs as domestic and service workers. In many of these cases, women take on jobs caring for the children of families in wealthier nations, while leaving their own children in the country of origin. This can mean that their own children are not well-cared for and may suffer as a result.

=== Distribution of household labor ===
Although women may take a greater role in providing for the family financially, this does not always mean that men take on a greater share of the housework. Studies on Taiwanese and Korean immigrants in New York found that the distribution of household labor in the home varied with class. In general, husbands in families belonging to the professional class were more likely to take on household work than in those belonging to the working class. Among Chicano families belonging to the professional class, a study found that husbands took on an even greater share of the household labor when compared to professional-class families from other ethnic groups. These studies found, however, that even among immigrant families in the professional class, wives still did the bulk of the work. Among many Vietnamese immigrant families, reproductive labor is still seen as the responsibility of women. In the United States, the scope of this household work is expanded to include dealing with larger institutions like schools, utility companies, and the health-care system. Women may also take over the task of finding housing and dealing with landlords. Language barriers and the threat of feeling powerless may lead men to avoid interactions with such bureaucracies, leaving the job of navigating these complex systems to women. This results in women having superior knowledge of the workings of such systems. Among Vietnamese immigrants, women are often thought of as experts on health-care, and men may defer to women since they have more knowledge of how the health-care system operates. In the case of Vietnamese immigrants, although women were still expected to take responsibility for a disproportionate amount of household-related labor, the change in the nature of such labor gives them the skills and the confidence to know how to deal with societal institutions. This knowledge provides women with a certain amount of leverage within the household and provides them with a greater amount of social and cultural capital relative to men.

== Generation ==
Inequality may exist between members of different generations within a family. Assimilation into American society may create changes in the traditional family structure, particularly among immigrants who come from cultures in which age is a strong determinant of status and power. American culture places a high value on individuality. The high importance placed on self-determination in American culture may go against the traditional values of cultures in which children are expected to obey and respect the wishes of their parents in all facets of their lives. The migration process is often stressful and can lead to conflicts between family members, particularly those of different generations.

=== Degree of assimilation ===
Among many immigrant families, members of the younger generation tend to assimilate to American culture at a faster rate than members of older generations. This can create divides along generational lines. Members of the older generation may dislike the influence that American culture has on the younger generation, particularly shifts from communal values to a more individualistic mindset. On the other hand, members of the younger generation may view their elders as too set in their ways and out of touch with American society. Such sentiments can lead to conflict between family members. Points of contention include clothing, speech, displaying respect for elders, and dating practices.

Family members who identify more with the culture of their home country may experience frustration when they attempt to instill their cultural values into younger family members. Popular media, schools, and peers act as powerful socializing agents and members of the older generation may feel that they cannot compete with these pervasive cultural and social forces. Parents may blame television and magazines for the unwanted change they see in their children and if they decide to act by cracking down on their children's access to popular media, this may lead to further generational schisms.

These divides can also occur between members of the same generation, particularly between older siblings who may identify more strongly with their home country and younger siblings who may identify more with American culture. This is especially likely to occur when older siblings belong to the 1.5 generation, meaning that they were born abroad, and younger siblings were born in the United States. In many societies, older siblings are given greater responsibilities and may feel more pressure from parents to set a good example for their younger siblings by performing well in school and obtaining success. At the same time, this greater responsibility often affords older siblings a greater degree of power within the family. Older siblings may therefore also be more likely to uphold their parents' traditional values because of the power it affords them within the family. In America's more egalitarian culture, power hierarchies based on age are less likely to be accepted. Younger siblings may therefore reject the authority of their older siblings, fostering tensions within the family. The migration process can therefore destabilize traditional power hierarchies within the family based on age and in some cases may lead to a reversal of such hierarchies. Regardless of whether tension exists among members of different generations or members of the same generation, degree of assimilation may pave the way for divisions within the family.

==== Language proficiency ====
In many immigrant families, members of the younger generation have greater English language proficiency than their elders. In families where parents may know little to no English, children may act as interpreters. Young children may therefore be involved in important family matters, including finances. In cases where children are in charge of paying bills, they may be in a position to take a portion of their parents' money for their own use. Even when this is not the case, the role of interpreter gives a particular family member a certain measure of control over other family members who are unable to communicate as well in English.

==== Cultural capital ====
An interesting aspect of cultural capital that sometimes comes into play in immigrant families is familiarity with American laws. Parents may find that U.S. law is in conflict with their traditional means of disciplining their children. While parents may be accustomed to certain parental rights in their home country, these rights may not be protected in American society. There may be cases in which outside agents—either school officials, police officers, or government officials—become involved in conflicts between parents and children. This is particularly true in cases of alleged physical abuse. Children, who may be more familiar with American laws, can use this knowledge to gain assistance from individuals outside of the family. The involvement of outside agents may tip the traditional power balance within the family and affords family members who are more familiar with the rules and norms of the United States a certain degree of power over family members who are not as familiar with these laws. Among immigrants who come from cultures with strict hierarchies based on age, such interventions can be devastating to parents who may feel that their authority has been undermined. Family members who are better assimilated into American culture are more able, and probably more likely, to utilize their knowledge of American laws to change the dynamics of family relations. This generates inequality based on degree of assimilation since those who are less assimilated are more likely to lose face as the result of the penetration of such laws into the traditionally private domain of the family.

==== Duality of exclusion ====
Nichollas Walter in his study of youth immigrants reveal that the young immigrants constantly encounters the duality of exclusion and inclusion in their life. They often define themselves as Americans because their philosophies and mindsets are no different from other contemporary Americans. However, at the same time, they feel excluded in real life because they cannot easily debunk their undocumented immigrant status. This experience often hampers a stable formation of identity among these young second-generations. Consequently, due to their discouraging youth period, these young immigrants are often discouraged to participate in the politics even after they gained appropriate legal status for residency in the United States. Recently, there have been #DREAMers online movements on different social media platforms such as Facebook and Twitter. In fact, social media has become a key tool for the younger immigrant population in their process of assimilating into the U.S. society. By publicly sharing their narratives as undocumented immigrants, these young immigrants could successfully increase their political representation and solidify a sense of personal identity.

=== Social mobility and resources ===
Parents may feel that their authority over their children is weakened because there are greater resources available in the United States and children are thus less dependent upon their parents for financial support. Some parents believe that children's greater independence also makes them less likely to heed parent's teachings and advice. In particular, children in immigrant families may have greater access to education and work opportunities. These, in turn, can help facilitate social mobility, raising the socioeconomic status of subsequent generations of immigrants relative to first generation immigrants (see Second generation immigrants in the United States).

==== Education ====
In many immigrants' countries of origin, education is not free. Children therefore rely on their parents for the fees necessary to obtain an education. In some cases, this means that children are unable to complete their education because their parents are unable to pay the school fees or would rather invest that money someplace else, perhaps in another child's education. Girls, in particular, may be unlikely to complete their education because of many cultures' preference for boys. After immigrating to the United States, all children have access to free education through high school, and can apply for scholarships to help fund a college education as well. While parental contributions are still important, especially in the case of college tuition, this removes many of the barriers to educational achievement and also means that parents no longer have as much control over their children's access to educational opportunities.

Among some immigrant groups, especially those who come from origin countries in which education is not free or widely available, first-generation immigrants may have had little formal schooling. Immigrant parents tend to have lower levels of formal schooling than U.S.-born parents. Low levels of education among parents can have a negative impact on their children's ability to succeed in school. On the other hand, the effort that these immigrant parents put into trying to help their children do well in school can have a significant impact on the academic achievement of students. Parents thus have some measure of control over the likelihood that their children will succeed in school. If children perceive their parents as supportive, they will be more likely to do well in their academic endeavors, regardless of the practical help their parents are actually able to provide. If parents are not invested in their children's success in school—or if they create barriers to children's education by asking children to work rather than attend school—this lack of emotional support can have a negative impact on children's likelihood of educational success.

Children who were born before the family immigrated to the United States may have more difficulty succeeding academically than children who were born after the move to the United States, or who were very young at the time of immigration. This is likely due to the fact children who were born in the United States, or immigrated at a very early age, are more likely to be assimilated into American culture and to possess greater levels of English language ability than children who were born before the family immigrated. Other research confirms the fact that second generation groups tend to have higher levels of academic achievement than first generation groups.

==== Employment opportunities ====
First generation immigrants may be more likely to hold "ethnic 'niche' occupations" as well as occupations in low-wage sectors. This occupational concentration provides few opportunities for advancement beyond relatively low-wage service-sector jobs. The employment opportunities available to immigrants are often dependent on their English language proficiency. Recent immigrants are less likely to be fluent in English which may only give them access to low-wage jobs where English proficiency is not as important. Recent immigrants are thus overrepresented in low-wage occupations. Subsequent generations, however, are less likely to be so occupationally concentrated by ethnicity and nationality. Members of later generations generally have access to a wider range of jobs which provide them with greater opportunities for upward social mobility.

== See also ==
- Birthright citizenship in the United States
- Care work
- Educational inequality
- Gender inequality in the United States
- Gender role
- Healthcare availability for undocumented immigrants in the United States
- Immigrant health care in the United States
- Immigration to the United States
- Income inequality in the United States
- Intra-household bargaining
- Migrant worker
- Second-generation immigrants in the United States
- Social inequality
- Social mobility
- Sociology of the family
- Transnational marriage
- Women migrant workers from developing countries
- Work–family balance in the United States
