= PositiveSingles =

PositiveSingles.com
- Type: Private
- Website: PositiveSingles.com
- Founded: 2001
- Headquarters: Vaughan, Ontario
- Alexa US rank: 12,556 (October 2014)

PositiveSingles is a friendship, social, and dating website that specifically caters to people who are living with sexually transmitted diseases (STD), including herpes, HIV, HPV, and others. Its services are mainly provided in North America and Europe. PositiveSingles was founded in 2001 and its headquarters are in Vaughan, Ontario. The company is privately held.
