= Second-generation immigrants in the United States =

Second generation immigrant is a misnomer for Second-generation Americans in the United States who are individuals born and raised in the United States who have at least one foreign-born parent. Data collectors originally used long terms like "Second generation of the immigrant family lineage" and this eventually got exhausting to use, so overtime they shortened it to “Second-generation immigrant”. This created an oxymoron since being an immigrant requires moving from ones native born country.

As the Fourteenth Amendment to the United States Constitution guarantees citizenship to any individual born in the U.S. who is also subject to the jurisdiction of the U.S., second-generation Americans are currently granted U.S. citizenship by birth. However, political debate over repealing this right has increased in recent years. Advocates of this motion claim that this right attracts unauthorized immigration to the U.S. The repeal of birthright citizenship would have the greatest impact on future Mexicans born in the United States, as Mexico is the country of origin for the majority of undocumented immigrants in the U.S.

The growing presence of first-generation immigrants in the U.S. has led to a growth in the percentage of the population that can be categorized as second-generation Americans. This is due to immigrants being more likely than native born adults to have children. In 2009, immigrants, both legal and unauthorized, were the parents of 23% of all children in the U.S. The process by which second-generation Americans undergo assimilation into U.S. society affects their economic successes and educational attainments, with the general trend being an improvement in earnings and education relative to the parental generation. Second-generation Americans have an increasingly important impact on the national labor force and ethnic makeup. People are likely to overestimate the population size of second-generation Americans due to fear of their growing economic success and hold discriminatory attitudes towards them.

== Statistics ==
In 2009, 33 million people in the United States were second-generation immigrants, representing 11% of the national population. There are significant differences in income and education levels between the second generation immigrant population and the first generation immigrant population in the United States. Second-generation immigrants are doing better overall and are assimilating more successfully into U.S. society.

=== Income ===
In comparison to first generation immigrants, second-generation immigrants are more likely to achieve higher earnings. In 2008, the median annual earnings for second-generation immigrants were $42,297 while the median annual earnings for first generation immigrants were $32,631. In the same year, the U.S. Census Bureau found that second-generation immigrants had higher earnings overall, with 42% of the second generation immigrant population earning above $50,000 compared to just 31% of the first generation immigrant population. Second-generation immigrants are also less likely to live in poverty relative to their first generation counterparts.

=== Education levels ===
Population by generational status and educational attainment in the US, 2009

Second-generation immigrants are more educated compared to first generation immigrants, exceeding parental education in many instances. A greater percentage of second-generation immigrants have obtained a level of education beyond a high school diploma, with 59.2% having at least some college education in 2009. Also in 2009, 33% of the second generation immigrant population had a bachelor's degree. The following graph depicts the data collected by the U.S. Census Bureau on educational attainments for immigrant generations in the year 2009.

In earlier studies, migration is shown to be a risk factor in child development. On the contrary, many immigrant adolescents perform equally or even better than national adolescents, specifically in school. Reports have shown that immigrant adolescents earn better grades in school than their national contemporaries, despite their lower socio-economic status. However, as immigrant youth assimilate into United States culture, their developmental and educational outcomes become less optimal. This phenomenon is known as the Immigrant Paradox. There are a couple explanations for this phenomenon, first of all being the free public education system of the United States. For Latino immigrants, free access to education is a major factor in deciding to immigrate to the U.S. and once they arrive, they stress upon their children the importance to succeed academically in order to make their lives better. Another factor increasing the initial educational success of immigrants is the fact that many of them are bilingual. Native bilingualism allows immigrants a distinct advantage in the completion of composite tasks.

== Theories on cultural assimilation ==
The majority of immigrants in the United States are non-white. Immigrants come from diverse backgrounds and have unique cultures taken from their native countries. The children of such immigrants in the U.S., also known as "second-generation immigrants," experience a cultural conflict between that of their parents and that of mainstream U.S. society. The process by which these second-generation immigrants assimilate into society is increasingly being researched, and multiple theories on the cultural assimilation of second-generation immigrants have been proposed.

=== Segmented assimilation ===
The theory of segmented assimilation for second-generation immigrants is highly researched in the sociological arena. Segmented assimilation focuses on the notion that people take different paths in how they adapt to life in the United States. This theory states that there are three main paths of assimilation for second-generation immigrants. Some immigrants assimilate smoothly into the white middle class of America, others experience downward assimilation, and others experience rapid economic success while preserving the values of their immigrant community.

This theory also includes the concept of modes of incorporation, which are the external factors within the host community that affect assimilation. These factors are created by the underlying policies of the government, the strength of prejudice in the society, and the makeup of coethnic communities within the society. These modes of incorporation affect how a child will assimilate into U.S. society, and determine how vulnerable the child will be towards downward assimilation. Factors that enhance such vulnerability include racial discrimination, location, and changes in the economy that have made it harder for intergenerational mobility.

In addition, differing modes of incorporation make available certain resources that second-generation immigrants can use to overcome challenges to the process of assimilation. If the child belongs to a group that has been exempt from the prejudice experienced by most immigrants, such as European immigrants, they will experience a smoother process of assimilation. A second generation immigrant can also make use of established networks in the coethnic community. These networks provide these children with additional resources beyond those offered by the government, such as gateways into well paying jobs in businesses established by the ethnic community.

Children of middle class immigrants have a greater likelihood of moving up the social ladder and joining American mainstream society than children of lower class immigrants, as they have access to both the resources provided by their parents and to the educational opportunities afforded to the middle class in the U.S.

==== Downward assimilation ====
Multiple factors affect the likelihood of downward assimilation, including race, location, and absence of mobility ladders. Generally, immigrants enter the sectors of the labor force that experience low pay, commonly through jobs in the service sector and manufacturing. Such jobs seldom offer chances for upward mobility. The lack of good pay and resources available to immigrant parents affects the likelihood of their U.S.-born children being able to rise out of poverty. Children born to low skilled immigrants may experience assimilation into the impoverished groups of the United States. Instead of adapting to the mainstream values and expectations of U.S. society, they take on the adversarial stance of the poor, entering the vicious cycle of poverty. According to the theory of segmented assimilation, second-generation immigrants are less likely to experience downward assimilation when their race does not align with groups that experience prejudice and discrimination, such as African Americans. Also, immigrant families can enter well established ethnic groups in the United States to increase their pool of resources, lowering the possibility of downward assimilation for their children.

==== Criticism ====
Not all studies coincide with the theory of segmented assimilation. Other studies have found that second generation immigrant groups' earnings are in line with native born groups. Arrest rates indicate similarities in the engagement of deviant behavior between second-generation immigrants and the white population in the U.S., contradicting the theory of segmented assimilation since these similarities support the idea of assimilation towards the dominant norm of mainstream U.S. society.

Despite the barriers that come from being born to immigrants who are generally low skilled, have little education, and have less knowledge of the English language compared to U.S. natives, second-generation immigrants are doing better than U.S. native groups of comparable racial backgrounds, contradicting the concept of downward assimilation. A major factor that contributes to second-generation immigrants doing so well is the drive to succeed and do better than their predecessors that is commonly instilled in these immigrants from childhood by their families. The theory of segment assimilation undermines such early socialization. Second-generation immigrants of minority status in terms of ethnicity can also move up the social economic ladder via minority rights and resources available through programs directed at the betterment of minority groups in the U.S. Second-generation immigrants are also entering the labor force with higher levels of education compared to their parents, which helps balance the negative effects associated with having low skilled immigrant parents.

Another major criticism of segmented assimilation is that it predicts downward mobility for children of low skilled immigrants when studies have shown that upward mobility is more likely due to the children already starting off at the bottom.

=== Other theories ===
The theory of "straight line" assimilation, also known as linear assimilation or simple assimilation, was developed based on the experiences of European immigrants to the U.S. in the early 20th century. This theory claims that as time passes and second-generation immigrants are exposed longer to the culture of mainstream U.S. society, the likelihood of assimilation into mainstream U.S. society increases. This theory predicts that each succeeding immigrant generation exhibits greater assimilation into mainstream society. With greater assimilation exhibited by each succeeding immigrant generation, unique ethnic characteristics that were clearly evident in the first generation fade away. The skin color of these immigrants led to them experiencing a smooth and straight line type of assimilation as they did not have to overcome the race barrier in their attempt to enter mainstream society.

Another theory on cultural assimilation centers on the racial/ethnic disadvantage model. This theory emphasizes that the process of assimilation for certain immigrant groups is blocked due to their race or ethnicity, meaning that discrimination in society and in the workplace hinders assimilation into mainstream U.S. society. The major critique of this theory is that it overstresses social barriers along racial and ethnic lines without providing adequate explanations for why many second-generation immigrants overcome these barriers and experience socioeconomic mobility.

== Differences within the second generation immigrant population ==
There is a great deal of diversity in terms of ethnicities and races within the second immigrant generation population. This diversity among immigrants can be seen in language use, as the majority of second-generation immigrants are bilingual, with 2/3 speaking a language other than English in their homes. In addition, differing ethnicity and racial groups have experiences that are unique to their group. Hispanics, Asian Americans, and Caribbean Americans are three of the major groups that make up the population of second-generation immigrants in the United States.

=== Hispanic and Latino Americans ===
In 2003, the Pew Research Center projected that in the next twenty years, second generation Latinos would account for the largest percentage of the U.S. population. In 2003 it was also projected that, if current trends continue, over the next 20 years, 1/4 of the growth in the labor force would be due to second-generation immigrants who are Latino. 1/7 of new students enrolling in schools within this same time period will also be second generation Latinos. The increasing representation of second-generation immigrants who are Latino in the areas of work, school, and the larger population can be attributed to the continuing influx of Latino immigrants and the high fertility rate of Latino immigrants, which is higher than any other segment of the national population.

As the number of second generation Latinos grows, so will their political and economical influence. In relation to educational achievement, second generation Latinos follow the general trend for second-generation immigrants in the United States. In comparison to first generation Latino immigrants, second generation Latinos are more likely to intermarry with members of other racial groups. These higher rates of racial intermarriage leads to an increase in the birthrates of interracial children, aiding in the elimination of disparities in the U.S. that exist along ethnic lines.

Currently, Mexican Americans constitute the largest percentage of second-generation immigrants in the United States. Among male high school graduates, the employment rates are comparable to those experienced by native born whites. When location is controlled for, the employment rate of Mexican American second-generation immigrants surpasses that of native born, non-Hispanic whites. Among male Mexican American second-generation immigrants who have less than a high school diploma, employment rates are also higher than those of native born, non-Hispanic whites. Mexican second generation women experience an employment rate slightly below that of native whites. This gap in labor participation increases for those with less than a high school diploma. Similar levels of labor force participation does not necessarily mean similar earnings, as part-time is considered employment and Mexican Americans are more likely to take on jobs with lower pay.

=== Asian Americans ===
The use term Asian American in the U.S. was cultivated during the time of the Civil Rights era, when minorities alike endeavoured to be heard, and since then the Asian American identity has continued to develop. However, it is suggested that this umbrella term was created as a political construct to compartmentalise and control minorities. Within Asian Americans, those of East Asian descent have been described as Orientals and those of South Asian descent as Hindoos (regardless if they were of the Hindu religion or not), however these terms are historical and are considered derogatory. Historically the predominant Asian ethnicities in the U.S. has been Chinese, Japanese, Indian, Filipino, and Korean, though among second generation Asian Americans ethnic diversity has increased considerably.

27% of the Asian population in the U.S. can be categorized as second-generation immigrants. The cultural assimilation of second generation Asians is diverse, coinciding with the theory of segmented assimilation. The diversification of the pool of Asian immigrants, where many are highly educated, plays a pivotal role in the assimilation of the second generation. Second generation Asian immigrants are therefore more likely to be born into a middle-class family than second-generation immigrants from other racial groups. Highly skilled Asian immigrants tend to settle in suburbs upon their arrival to the United States, further promoting the assimilation of their children into white middle class society. According to acculturation theory, the higher the self-esteem of an Asian and the closer they are to their parents, the less likely they are to internalise racism and more likely they are to maintain ethnic pride, desiring to associate with members of their own race.

Many of the negative stereotypes associated with Asian culture can be tied into critical race theory, and stereotypes are largely exaggerated and misrepresented in attempt to marginalise minorities and maintain ruling class hegemony to preserve existing Western power structures. These stereotypes are so powerful that some Asians come to believe them and internalize racism. Parallels can be drawn between Asians and Jews, as whilst very different, both achieved success despite marginalisation - the derogatory stereotype of an Asian tiger mum, for instance, is similar to the political stereotype of a Jewish mother. Asians are not monolithic, just like any other racial group, and it is political to generalise their background in this way. Similarly, there is the idea that Asians are not creative and are just focused on STEM. This again can be considered as a political construct aiming to dehumanise and 'peck down' members of a foreign race in a manner of tall poppy syndrome because it fails to explain the fact that success in the maths and sciences requires a high degree of lateral thinking alongside an innovation mindset.

There is the popular notion that Asians are more likely to study STEM at university to make more money, but it should also be considered that they are less likely to gravitate towards the humanities and social sciences because a lot of the material in these subjects have been created in response to political pressures that ultimately serve against them. For instance, much of History is taught from a Eurocentric perspective and is biased towards the West, and Drama frequently reflects an ethnocentric perception of Asians rather than realistic and authentic depictions of Asian cultures, colours, customs, and behaviors (Portrayal of East Asians in American film and theater). Whilst politics exists in the academic world of STEM, in general the subject material in these subjects are more objective and thus provides a less racist training ground for the development of critical thinking and analysis at university level. In addition, a career in STEM involves less discrimination and racism, and microagressions whilst existent are less common.

According to stereotype content model, Asians are viewed to be high in the 'competence' dimension, but low in the 'warmth dimension'; whereas the dominant White group are viewed to be high in the 'competence' dimension and also in the 'warmth' dimension'. This suggests that White people are more emotionally intelligent, compassionate and mature than Asian people - and thus morally superior. It implies that Asians are selfish and not very charitable, and thus undeserving of their high status in society, making them more likely to be scapegoated in times of threat. However, research shows that Asian and minority ethnic (BAME) volunteers and disabled people are more likely to have a less positive experience of volunteering and BAME volunteers have lower levels of satisfaction as volunteers. The collectivist culture of Asian countries makes Asian people helpful and considerate of their neighbour but does not encourage one to seek external rewards from moral acts.

According to the authoritarian and authoritative models of parenting, Asians are more likely to be raised under an Authoritarian parenting style, which is related to the fact that the Humanities ethnocentrically labels Asian societies and cultures as Authoritarian. This psychological model of understanding children's upbringing has a political spin, as it suggests that White parents - and thus White people - are morally superior, and Asian parents - and thus Asian people - are morally inferior. The reality is that just as there a great diversity in the way White people are raised, there is great diversity in the way different Asian people are raised, and it is political to compartmentalise the upbringing of an entire minority racial group in this way. The model contradicts itself, and states that children of Authoritarian parents are more likely to have an unhealthy relationship with drugs and alcohol, and worse health. Yet Asians have a high life expectancy and are also less likely to misuse drugs and alcohol in comparison to their counterparts from other ethnic groups. Moreover, the model states that children raised under an Authoritarian upbringing are more anxious due to a desire to succeed. Science shows that anxiety has evolutionary purpose, as whilst it can be unpleasant on a day to day basis, it is also what makes people more likely to take responsibility for their life outcome and have better health in the long run. Furthermore, children of immigrants are special in that, as their parents immigrated out of their country - in comparison to the ones who did not, they are probably more likely to have this genetic component for anxiety that aids their survival. Denigrating Asians (similar to Jews) in the West as anxious and neurotic through this authoritative vs authoritarian parenting model is political because it aims to deter them from taking responsibility for their life outcomes, making them believe they are mentally ill and that something - attributable to their upbringing and parents - is inherently wrong with them (psychiatry is political). This leads to lower self-esteem in Asian children. The authoritative vs authoritarian parenting model also suggests that children of Authoritarian parents do less well academically, because they have a less close relationship with their parents and worser critical thinking skills, but then appears to make an exception for Asian children who manage to do well academically. This parenting model also suggests that children with Authoritarian parents, i.e., "Asian kids", have worser communication skills, but this fails to take into consideration that most children of immigrants have to learn a language that is not the same as the mother tongue of their parents so naturally they are not as good as communicating in the language of the majority and also have a different way of relating to others that is more natural to them. This can help explain why Asians are generally known for doing better in, and gravitating towards, quantitative subjects rather than qualitative subjects, and also why there exists a separate test for measuring Intelligence Quotient - which Asians do better in - called the Cattell Culture Fair Intelligence Test ("an attempt to measure cognitive abilities devoid of sociocultural and environmental influences"). Through academic propaganda that is constructed by Western academics who work within Western research institutions, cultural hegemony attempts to socialise children of Asian youth into disliking their family and culture. This suggests that it is important to apply critical thinking to biased academic theories widespread in society such as the authoritarian vs authoritative parenting model which links Asian people to Authoritarianism, and has the audacity to imply that there is something less human - a moral defect - about an entire racial group that is foreign in relation to the dominant majority. This psychological model allows White parents, and their children, to have higher self esteem than Asian parents, and their children. The theory constantly makes contradictions and exceptions when Asian children do not fit into the model, without explaining this further, and is ultimately inconsistent and thus biased. It also encourages some Asian youth to focus on disproving political stereotypes applied to their youth culture (namely that they are boring, antisocial, studious and quantitative) to appear 'popular', 'not Asian', 'a cool Asian', 'an Asian accepted by Whites', 'a non-academic Asian', failing to reflect on how much of their behaviour is a rebellion designed by cultural hegemony and deters them from achieving positions of power, wealth, charity, status and influence.

In the educational system, according to Critical race theory Asians are more likely to be unfairly accused of cheating because teachers have unconscious bias towards them. Additionally, Asians are stereotyped as being uncreative, with people linking their high grades with a conformist personality that lacks critical thinking and soft skills. Asians are more likely to hold an internal locus of control and believe that hard work pays off, learning to dismiss and navigate (racist) workplaces in their journey upwards.

Asian second-generation immigrants, like their Hispanic counterparts, tend to be bilingual. Children of Asian immigrants often attend language schools on the weekend to learn and maintain their cultural heritage, but are likely to have their proficiency in their parents' native language weakened while maintaining an emotional attachment to their family and heritage, which helps them develop their identity. While second generation Asian immigrants strive for the middle class white status, as many of their parents do, they develop a sensitivity to issues of race and ethnicity, which can be a major factor in the process of assimilation.

This assimilation is also known to create "intergenerational family conflict", however this is generally a natural way of the child to individuate from their parents and integrate into society as an adult and is prevalent in families across all races; the focal theme of the conflict, culture and race, is often the path of least resistance for an adolescent to generate momentum to construct themselves into adult society. Asians later come to be very close with their families, as they usually are with the expected exception of adolescence - and are more likely to help ageing parents. In contrast to their parents, second generation Asian Americans are less likely to tolerate racial stereotyping and racial discrimination, are more likely to marry non-Asians and are more aware of their minority status and the disadvantages associated with it. This has been linked to racism and discrimination experienced by minorities in the U.S. as this heightened sensitivity is common among all second generation groups of minority status, and this heightened sensitivity evokes an enhanced drive for success. This focus on achievement helps explain the high educational successes seen by second generation Asian immigrants. College graduation rates are relatively high among second generation Asian Americans, with the two highest rates seen among the Chinese and Indian second generation.

Partly due to jealousy and envy related to their high socioeconomic success and a fear of what is different, Asians experience unique layers of discrimination in many aspects of their life, however these attitudes primarily come from White people and other minorities from lower socioeconomic backgrounds who have greater reason to feel threatened by their success. Currently, there is a prevailing idea that whilst Asians are successful at the entry level workplace, it is much rarer for them to take on leadership positions - and this is sometimes attributed to their 'lack of social skills'. However, the application of critical thinking suggests that this again is a negative stereotype. As more Asians learn how to navigate the political structures of the workplace and acquire confidence from seeing their co-ethnic network succeed as well, it is suggested that they will fully assimilate into existing Western power structures and become part of the new power elite. However, this does not rule out the importance of socioeconomic class, as like any type of social mobility in a society, the highest echelons of immigrant success is generally achieved by Asians whose parents immigrated from relatively high socioeconomic backgrounds from their home countries rather than those who immigrate due to a life threatening need. Currently, there is a lack of Asian representation in society, particularly for females. Asians are stereotyped to be submissive and neotenous, and whilst there may be a genetic and cultural component to this personality description, it can also be interpreted as a political construct to keep them subservient to White people and morally dependent. Asian American men are stereotyped as not masculine and effeminate and sensitive. Asian American women are often stereotyped to be submissive and petite, waiting 'to be saved'. Asians who are better at impression management are more likely to find success in the Western workplace. Many Asians, whose families are well educated and could have stayed in their home countries immigrate due to a desire to live in a culture which is more developed and better to raise their children in, for instance one which has a better education system.

Asian Americans have been characterized as a panethnicity of various groups or individuals. These generalizations are mostly based on outward appearance but just as the French are very different to the English, the Japanese are very different to Korean. Today, however, because of awareness made known by second generation Asian Americans, people are learning to associate and recognize the diverse cultures that exist under the umbrella term of Asian Americans. Aspects of different Asian cultures are considered favourably across the globe - for instance, Kpop and Chinese food. Whilst different types of Asians who live in their home countries are not always allies with each other, within the West, different Asians are more likely to get along with each other due to a shared understanding of life.

=== Afro-Caribbean Americans ===
Generally, first generation black immigrants of Caribbean origin in the United States tend to hold on tightly to their ethnic identities and resist the social pressures of identifying themselves as African Americans. Children born to these black Caribbean immigrants can easily enter the category of African Americans as they tend to lack the accents exhibited by their parents. A popular destination for these black immigrants is New York City, where the second generation black immigrant population is significant. Another popular destination is Florida, where in Miami there exists a strong Haiti community. In this community, also referred to as "Little Haiti", the Caribbean influence is clear as shops are decorated in bright Caribbean colors and decorations.

Further studies reveal that the identification of second-generation immigrants, of Caribbean heritage, as African Americans leads these children to be more aware of racial discrimination in the U.S. In addition, the assimilation into black society and black culture in the U.S. by these children is hindered by their parents' oppositional stance to American black culture, contributing to identity conflict. In the case of Haitians, first generation Haitians hold on strongly to their foreign identity, as they associate the preservation of their culture with stronger solidarity in the community. These first generation Haitians attempt to instill this same Haitian pride in their children as they want the children to succeed on the basis of ethnic solidarity and the preservation of Haitian culture, and not by giving in to American culture. This creates a clash between the ideas and values these children learn at home, and from their peers and the non-Haitian black community. Thus, these children face conflicting pressures from family, non-second generation immigrant peers, and discrimination by the larger society.

Racism is an important deterring factor to the process of assimilation for black second-generation immigrants, as it is for other second-generation immigrants of ethnic minorities. Children of middle class black immigrants undergo assimilation that coincides with one of the pathways theorized by segmented assimilation, in which they assimilate into mainstream society while attempting to hold on to their black culture. These children make use of the resources available to the middle class in the U.S. to prosper alongside their white counterparts, but are still affected by racial discrimination. They make use of so-called "black spaces," which are spaces exclusive to the black community, such as networks and ethnic enclaves designed for African Americans. Thus these spaces are free of racism and are used to connect with other African Americans and reconnect with the cultures of their parents. Similar to Asian second-generation immigrants born into the middle class, these black second-generation immigrants of middle class status are also aware of their inferior position and the disadvantages associated with being an ethnic minority in the United States.

== See also ==
- Immigrant generations
- Immigration
- Immigration to the United States
- Illegal immigration to the United States
- Immigrant health care in the United States
- Inequality within immigrant families in the United States
- Race and ethnicity in the United States census
