= VIDA Select =

Matchmaking and online dating services company

- Industry: Online dating, matchmaking
- Founded: June 2009
- Headquarters: Atlanta, Georgia
- Key people: Scott Valdez (CEO)
- Services: Matchmaking
- Website: www.vidaselect.com

VIDA Select is a virtual dating and matchmaking service that creates and manages online dating profiles on behalf of its members. The company was founded by CEO Scott Valdez in 2009, under the name Virtual Dating Assistants.

== History ==
VIDA Select was founded by Scott Valdez in response to his personal frustration with online dating. According to Valdez, he once sent 47 messages on dating platforms without receiving a single response. He hired a friend who was a professional writer to assist him in managing his profile and engaging with prospects. Others in his circle requested similar help, and he established the company as a service.

Originally operating on a small scale, the company expanded significantly after Valdez placed a job advertisement on Craigslist seeking creative writers with a talent for online communication.

== Services ==
VIDA Select offers a range of online dating services including profile creation, writing personalized messages, and matching with potential dates on apps such as Tinder, Bumble, and Hinge. The service is staffed by ghostwriters, matchmakers, and virtual dating assistants who work on behalf of clients to increase their chances of finding a romantic partner. The service also provides "a targeted search for matches who fit all the qualities you're seeking in an ideal partner", and "a professional matchmaker to guide you through every step in the dating process". One VIDA ghostwriter described the work as creatively fulfilling and emotionally rewarding, likening it to "trying on new shoes and seeing myself in another life". Employees are paid hourly wages, with rates adjusted based on experience and local cost of living.

Ghostwriters adopt clients' communication styles and preferences, often writing as if they were the client themselves. Relationship writer Jon Birger compares VIDA Select's use of "keyboard charmers" to land first dates to a modern-day version of Cyrano de Bergerac. VIDA has been the subject of criticism because of this, with some calling such a service as a misrepresentation in dating. The company itself reportedly advises its customers to not disclose to any potential matches that they used VIDA's services. A scholarly examination referenced the company as an example of deliberate "signaling" behavior, constructing an idealized self-image through curated profiles and photos.

== Clientele ==
Clients span a wide range of demographics, though some ghostwriters specialize in particular segments, such as divorced men in their 40s and 50s. Employees work remotely and set their own schedules. Ghostwriters often manage multiple client profiles simultaneously, relying on detailed interviews to authentically represent the client’s personality. As of March 2024 VIDA Select's writing team consisted of 36 ghostwriters trained to adapt their tone and language to match client needs. The company has stated that nearly 80% of clients leave the service within three months, usually because they have met someone.

The online platform originally had primarily male members but later on women started joining the platform as well. As of 2018, VIDA reported that approximately a third of VIDA members were women.

Valdez has commented on the persistence of age-related preferences in modern dating. In an article in Woman's Own, he was noted as saying that many of VIDA Select's male clients in their 50s and 60s request matches in their early 30s, while also expressing a desire that their wealth not play a central role in their attractiveness, finding it "fascinating to see this combination of wanting youth and beauty while hoping money isn't part of the equation".

VIDA Select has provided industry commentary on algorithmic age filtering in dating platforms.

VIDA Select advises clients that if they desire partners significantly younger or older, and therefore outside the algorithmically permitted age ranges, they should try niche dating platforms that cater specifically to such preferences. The company emphasizes the importance of aligning one's dating strategy with the underlying mechanics of each platform and selecting dating services that are flexible enough to accommodate their specific relationship goals.
