= K-1 visa =

Type of American visa

A K-1 visa is a visa issued to the fiancé or fiancée of a United States citizen to enter the United States. A K-1 visa requires a foreigner to marry his or her U.S. citizen petitioner within 90 days of entry, or depart the United States. Once the couple marries, the foreign citizen can adjust status to become a lawful permanent resident of the United States (Green Card holder). Although a K-1 visa is legally classified as a non-immigrant visa, it usually leads to important immigration benefits and is therefore often processed by the Immigrant Visa section of United States embassies and consulates worldwide.

In 2014, the Department of State issued a total of 35,925 K-1 visas to fiancées of U.S. citizens. Including derivative categories—mostly for children of fiancées—a total of 41,488 visas in the K category were issued.

In 2018, the total cost for all parts of the K-1 Visa was US$2,025.

== Background ==
The K visa category was established in 1970, during U.S. involvement in the Vietnam War. The U.S. military required that Vietnamese citizens who wished to marry a U.S. soldier obtain both an exit visa from the Vietnamese authorities and an immigrant visa from the U.S. Embassy. Obtaining these documents was a time-consuming process and involved acquiring medical and police clearances for the Vietnamese citizen, and notarized embassy certificates from the American. Many couples could not complete the process before the soldier had to depart for the U.S. When this happened, the Vietnamese citizen would be ineligible to receive a visitor visa to America as an intending immigrant. Immigrant visa numbers were also unavailable. In 1970, about 100 American-Vietnamese couples found themselves in this situation, resulting in considerable Congressional correspondence with the embassy. On April 7, 1970, Congress passed Public Law 91-225, which amended the Immigration and Nationality Act of 1952 and created the K visa category.

Today, U.S. law allows several ways for an American citizen to petition for a foreign loved one to immigrate to the United States. Immigrant visas are available for an American to marry his or her spouse in a foreign country and then petition the spouse to immigrate to the United States. Spouses of U.S. citizens receive immediate preference to immigrate to the United States. However, in some cases a foreign citizen and an American citizen cannot legally marry in a foreign country, even though the marriage would have no legal impediments in the United States. For example, some countries require a parent's permission to marry even for adults, or to marry outside of one's religion or ethnic group. Additionally, some couples prefer to have their wedding in the United States. In these circumstances, a K-1 visa is especially useful.

== Process of applying for a K-1 visa ==
Before filing for a K-1 Visa a couple must have seen each other in person within 2 years prior to the filing. No attorney or other intermediary is necessary to petition someone for a K-1 visa, however some choose to hire an attorney or document preparation agency to help with the paperwork and/or facilitate the process. Approval of the petition does not ensure that the visa will be granted. After this, the foreign fiancé(e) has four months to apply for a K-1 visa. The embassy or consulate will schedule a medical exam with the panel physician and a visa interview at the embassy. Typically, Embassies request that fiancé(e)s bring evidence of their relationship to the interview, such as photographs together, correspondence between the two, phone bills showing calls to each other, etc. As of 2017, the income of the petitioner must meet or exceed the US poverty guidelines.

Once the interview is finished the consular officer can issue the visa, if the officer is convinced of a bona fide relationship that meets all legal requirements. A K-1 visa is printed on a label placed into the fiancé(e)'s passport. It is valid for one entry into the United States within six months of the date of issuance. The total time from filing of the initial petition to the actual issuance of a visa can vary. As of 2017 it averaged around 15 months.

== Requirements for a K-1 visa ==
Both fiancés must be eligible to be lawfully married in the jurisdiction where the marriage will take place. For example, at the time the visa petition is filed, as well as at issuance, they must both be of legal marriageable age and not already married to each other or to anyone else.

The petitioner must be a U.S. citizen.

Both fiancés must have met in person at least once within two years prior to filing the visa petition. This requirement may be waived by the Department of Homeland Security, but only for cases with extreme hardship or if their culture forbids a man and a woman to meet in person before marrying.

The fiancés must be in a bona fide relationship and intend to live together after marrying.

The visa applicant is required to demonstrate to the consular officer that they are unlikely to become a public charge in the United States. Generally, this is accomplished by the petitioner filing an Affidavit of Support (Form I-134) showing they have income or assets that are above that of the poverty line in the petitioner's state of residence.

Both fiancés may be required to submit certain documents, such as birth certificates and identification cards, to prove their identity, as well as divorce decrees/ or annulment records, if applicable, to prove they are eligible to marry. The precise documents required are set by the embassy in each country to reflect the documents commonly used in that country.

Some individuals, such as those with certain untreated communicable diseases, those who have committed crimes of moral turpitude, those who are addicted to illegal drugs, persons who were previously deported from the US, and those who have engaged in acts of terrorism or are members of a designated terrorist organization are ineligible.

== Conditions of a K-1 visa ==
After marrying their fiancé in the US, the K-1 visa holder should apply to adjust their status to permanent resident by using Form I-485.

If a K-1 visa holder does not marry their fiancé within 90 days of entering the US on the K-1 visa, they are required to leave the US before the end of the 90-day period.

A K-1 visa may only be used once to enter the US.

After marrying their fiancé in the US and applying to adjust their status to permanent resident but before becoming a permanent resident, the person may temporarily leave the US by applying for advance parole using Form I-131.

== Related visa categories ==
If a K-1 visa beneficiary has unmarried children under age 21, they may be eligible to enter the US with their parent with a K-2 visa. The child may be a natural-born child, stepchild, or adopted child of the K-1 visa beneficiary. These children may either immigrate at the same time as their parent, or they may follow to join the parent up to one year after the issuance of the parent's K-1 visa.

Two additional "K" categories of visas exist. The K-3 visa is for the spouse of a US citizen. It was created to allow a foreign spouse of a US citizen the opportunity to enter the US as a non-immigrant and adjust status to a lawful permanent resident by filling out the I-485 form to the USCIS. It is similar to the IR1/CR1 category which are also for the spouse of a US citizen. The only practical difference is that a K-3 visa is a non-immigrant visa, thus the foreign spouse must adjust to immigrant status after arrival in the US. The IR1/CR1 visa categories are immigrant visas thus require no adjustment of status once the beneficiary has arrived in the United States. A K-4 visa is a derivative visa issued to the child of a K-3 visa holder.

== Fraud considerations ==
Because the K-1 visa leads to immediate immigration, and eligibility for employment, in the United States, it is considered to be a high fraud visa category. To partially address these concerns, Congress passed the Immigration Marriage Fraud Amendments of 1986, which placed a two-year conditional period on a foreign spouse's permanent residency. Dissolution of the marriage within those two years can lead to removal of the foreigner's permanent residency status.

Lenni Benson has stated that, although the K-1 visa program is widely associated with sham marriages, "It is not true in the majority of cases."

Detecting marriage fraud is of utmost importance to the USCIS. Government officials are specially trained to detect any fraud. Attributes of a bona fide relationship, which proves validity, can be common language or religion, shared vacations, events, and holidays, combined finances and property and more, but most of all, it is the intention to have a real marital relationship.

A survey completed by the United States Immigration and Naturalization Service (INS) in the 1980s found approximately 30% of these marriages are under suspicion of fraud. Fraudulent marriage is any marriage that has been entered into with the sole purpose of circumventing the law. According to the Immigration and Nationality Act (INA), Act 255 (8 U.S.C. § 1325), the consequences of entering into a marriage in order to evade the law include incarceration for up to five years, a fine of up to $250,000, or both.

Other fraud concerns include routine romance scam or romance fraud, usually victimizing the American petitioner, as well as attempts by foreigners to pay an American to knowingly enter into a sham marriage.

== International Marriage Broker Regulation Act ==
In response to concerns about domestic violence, Congress passed the International Marriage Broker Regulation Act in 2005. The act requires that persons granted a K visa be given a brochure detailing the rights and protections for foreign spouses in the United States, and requires that American petitioners who have been convicted of certain crimes of violence, abuse or multiple crimes involving drugs declare this on the petition, among other things. If two or more K-1 visa petitions were filed at any time in the past or if a petitioner previously had a K-1 visa petition approved within two years prior to the filing of another petition, the petitioner must apply for a waiver. To request a waiver a written request must be submitted with the new petition accompanied by documentation of the claim to the waiver. If the petitioner has a history of violent offenses, the adjudicator may not waive the filing limitations unless extraordinary circumstances exist in the petitioner's case.

Additionally, under the Adam Walsh Child Protection and Safety Act of 2006, any person convicted of a felony sex crime involving children is ineligible to petition a foreigner to immigrate to the United States, including on a K-1 visa. The Secretary of the Department of Homeland Security can issue a waiver of this Act at his or her sole discretion.

== See also ==
- 90 Day Fiancé, a show where K-1 visa applicants are documented
