= Anti Mail-Order Spouse Act =

The Anti Mail-Order Spouse Act of 2016

Congress of the Philippines
- Long title: An act providing stronger measures against unlawful practices, businesses and schemes of matching and offering Filipinos to foreign nationals for purposes of marriage or common law partnership, repealing for the purpose Republic Act No. 6955, also referred to as the "Anti-Mail Order Bride Law".
- Citation: Republic Act 10906
- Territorial extent: Philippines
- Enacted by: House of Representatives
- Enacted by: Senate

Legislative history

First chamber: House of Representatives
- Bill title: Same title as final law
- Introduced: July 21, 2016
- Status: In force

The Anti Mail-Order Bride Law of 1990

Congress of the Philippines
- Long title: An Act to Declare Unlawful the Practice of Matching Filipino Women for Marriage to Foreign Nationals on A Mail Order Basis and Other Similar Practices, Including the Advertisement, Publication, Printing Or Distribution of Brochures, Fliers and Other Propaganda Materials in Furtherance Thereof and Providing Penalty Therefore
- Citation: Republic Act 6955
- Territorial extent: Philippines
- Enacted by: House of Representatives
- Enacted by: Senate

Legislative history

First chamber: House of Representatives
- Bill title: Same title as final law
- Introduced: June 13, 1990
- Status: Repealed

The Anti Mail-Order Spouse Act, officially designated as Republic Act 10906, is a Philippine law that prohibits the business of organizing or facilitating marriages between Filipinas, colloquially called "mail-order brides", and foreign men.

It replaced a 1990 law, the Anti Mail-Order Bride Law, enacted by the Congress of the Philippines as a result of stories in local media about Filipinas being abused by their foreign husbands. In practice, it was readily circumvented by basing matchmaking agencies outside the Philippines as no law prohibits their operation in destination countries such as Japan, the United States of America or South Korea. In 2009, the Commission on Filipinos Overseas (CFO) had just three active cases open against marriage brokers; there were no cases between 2003 and 2007. It has been used occasionally to combat forced marriage and human trafficking; while its penalties are weaker than those of Republic Act 9208 (the Anti-Trafficking in Persons Act of 2003), cases under it may be easier to prove in the often slow and inefficient Philippine judicial system. Because of this, Filipinas often use "reverse publications"—publications in which men advertise themselves—to contact foreign men seeking marriage.

In April 2009, Philippine ambassador to South Korea Luis Cruz estimated that 6,000 Filipinas had met South Korean spouses through matchmaking agencies. Some of these brides have complained of domestic violence or having received false information regarding their partner's background. Philippine embassies have issued warnings regarding international matchmaking agencies that violate local laws in their own country and use deceptive advertising.

In August 2013, a bill was introduced in the House of Representatives of the Philippines to extend the law to internet services. Rep. Cinchona Gonzales (CIBAC), who filed the bill, said "A new era of professional prostitution or high-end pornography through the web was born which downgrades the integrity not only of Filipino women, but of the country as a whole."

== Legislative text ==
=== Republic Act 10906 ===
RA 10906 lapsed into law on July 21, 2016, without the signature of then-president Benigno Aquino III. It declared illegal all of the following: [to]

(a) Engage in any business or scheme for money, profit, material, economic or other consideration which has for its purpose the matching or offering of a Filipino to a foreign national for marriage or common law partnership on a mail-order basis or through personal introduction, email, or websites on the internet; [to]
(b) Exhibit, advertise, publish, print, or distribute, or cause the exhibition, advertisement, publication, printing, or distribution of brochures, flyers, or propaganda materials which are calculated to promote the prohibited acts in the preceding paragraph, or to post, advertise, or upload such materials through websites on the internet; [to]
(c) Solicit, enlist, or in any manner, attract or induce any Filipino to become a member in any club or association whose objective is to match Filipino nationals to foreign nationals for the purpose of marriage or common law partnership for a fee; and
(d) To use the postal service or any website on the internet to promote the prohibited acts under this section.

However, "the above notwithstanding, legitimate dating websites, which have for their purpose connecting individuals with shared interests in order to cultivate personal and dating relationships, are not covered by this Act." With this Act, the Congress of the Philippines extended the law to criminalize the running of matchmaking businesses online with the sole purpose of connecting Filipina women and foreign men (or Filipino men and foreign women), whether for a fee or not.

In a De La Salle University primer on the law and its place in the related Magna Carta for Women, they note that the law sees websites that are intended only for foreigners to meet Filipinas as illegitimate; while general dating sites may be allowed depending on the other circumstances of the case.

=== Republic Act 6955 ===
RA 6955 was approved on June 13, 1990 and repealed on July 21, 2016, when it was replaced by RA 10906. It declared illegal:

(a) For a person, natural or juridical, association, club or any other entity to commit, directly or indirectly, any of the following acts:

(1) To establish or carry on a business which has for its purpose the matching of Filipino women for marriage to foreign nationals either on a mail-order basis or through personal introduction;

(2) To advertise, publish, print or distribute or cause the advertisement, publication, printing or distribution of any brochure, flier, or any propaganda material calculated to promote the prohibited acts in the preceding subparagraph;

(3) To solicit, enlist or in any manner attract or induce any Filipino woman to become a member in any club or association whose objective is to match women for marriage to foreign nationals either on a mail-order basis or through personal introduction for a fee;

(4) To use the postal service to promote the prohibited acts...

(b) For the manager or officer-in-charge or advertising manager of any newspaper, magazine, television or radio station, or other media, or of an advertising agency, printing company or other similar entities, to knowingly allow, or consent to, the acts prohibited in the preceding paragraph.

== See also ==
- List of Philippine laws
