= Mail-order bride =

Woman who advertises for marriage

A mail-order bride is a woman who lists herself in catalogs and is selected by a man for marriage. In the twentieth century, the trend primarily involved women living in developing countries seeking men from more developed nations. Men who list themselves in such publications are referred to as "mail-order husbands", although this is much less common. As of 2002, there were an estimated 100,000–150,000 mail order brides worldwide.

The term mail-order bride has been criticized by international marriage agencies, who nevertheless continue to use it as an easily recognizable term. Women of Asian descent have also criticized the term, which they consider stigmatizing to women in such relationships. Consequently, some researchers have rejected the term.

== Demographics ==
Around 100,000 to 150,000 women advertised themselves as mail-order brides globally in 2002. Of these, around 4,000 to 6,000 are married to American men every year, according to CIS estimates. More mail-order brides originate from the Philippines than any other country, in spite of the illegality of mail-order brides in the Philippines.

According to Robert Scholes, in a sample of over 6,000 mail-order brides, 4,600 were of Asian origin, of which 3,050 were from the Philippines, while 1,700 originated from former Soviet Union countries such as Russia and Ukraine. A smaller number were from Latin America. The majority of the American men who married foreign wives were white and upper-class.

Of the foreign brides given residence status in the United States in 2002, 50% were from East Asia (mainly China, Vietnam and the Philippines), 25% were from European countries (mainly Russia and Ukraine), and 5% were from Latin America.

Owing to the large number of single men in rural Japan, mail-order brides from the Philippines became common in the 1990s, and in 2006, the number of such marriages peaked at 12,150. Although the number of marriages has dropped to less than 4,000, Filipinas still make up the largest number of foreign brides in Japan.

Due to the rising cost of paying for a bride in China, some Chinese men from working class communities have paid marriage brokers for wives from Vietnam, Laos or Cambodia. Although many of the women from Vietnam willingly marry for love or economic reasons, some are kidnapped and sold by human traffickers. According to China's Ministry of Public Security, 17,746 women were rescued from human traffickers in a period of less than two years.

== Motivations ==
=== East and Southeast Asia ===
Many international brides come from developing countries in East Asia and Southeast Asia, and occasionally from South Asia as well. The countries the women come from are faced with unemployment, malnutrition and inflation. However, economic factors are not the only driving factor for women in Asia to enter the mail-order industry. In some cases women were recruited based on their physical appearance, with an emphasis placed on youth and virginity. This is found among boutique agencies, most of which cater to wealthy men from other Asian nations. During the 1990s, the majority of Asian mail-order brides came from the Philippines, Thailand, Vietnam, Malaysia, Indonesia, Sri Lanka, India, Taiwan, Macau, South Korea, Hong Kong, and China.

In 2022, Monica Liu published findings which question the common assumption that mail-order brides in East Asia are often seeking marriage to escape poverty. She found that many marriage agencies in China cater to women from wealthy backgrounds that were primarily middle-aged and divorced. Liu found that in many cases, wealthy Chinese women sought Western men because of a Chinese dating culture not accommodating for middle-aged and older single women. However, for the wealthiest Chinese women, the lower income of their foreign boyfriends was sometimes an impediment to marriage.

According to Ericka Johnson, in Taiwan, many Taiwanese men seek Southeast Asian women as mail-order wives because they prefer hard-working women who will accept the drudges of daily housewife chores, while Taiwanese women reject this traditional view of a woman's role in marriage. For this reason, Taiwanese women seek to marry Western mail-order husbands.

==== Indonesia ====
Indonesian women, mainly sex workers, enter the mail-order bride industry in hopes of escaping poverty in Indonesia. The Indonesian government has warned its citizens against mail-order bride schemes rampant in the country, which are often fronts for illegal human trafficking activities. Still, mail-order bride activities persist in Indonesian society today, especially in the country's impoverished and provincial areas. In April 2025, Indonesian news agency Antara revealed in a report that incidents of mail-order bride schemes used as fronts for prostitution, human trafficking, and other illegal activities have seen a steady increase in the country.

==== Philippines ====
Filipina women often entered the mail-order industry in the hope of marrying abroad, and then sponsoring their family for immigration.

=== Eastern Europe ===
Economic and social conditions for women in Russia and other Post-Soviet states are a motivational factor in finding foreign arrangements. The rise of Russian mail-order brides happened immediately after the collapse of the Soviet Union. In 2004, testimony before the United States Senate, Professor Donna Hughes said that two-thirds of Ukrainian women interviewed wanted to live abroad and this rose to 97% in the resort city of Yalta.

==== Russia ====
In 1999 it was reported that women in Russia earned 43 percent of what men did. Marriage is a substantial part of Russian culture, with 30 years being the age at which a woman is considered an "old maid".

== International marriage agencies ==
An international marriage agency (also called an international introduction agency or international marriage broker) is a business that endeavors to introduce men and women of different countries for the purpose of marriage, dating, or correspondence. Many of these marriage agencies are based near women in developing countries (such as Colombia, China, Thailand, and the Philippines). International marriage agencies encourage women to register for their services, and facilitate communication and meetings with men from developed regions of Europe, North America, Japan, South Korea, and Australia. This network of smaller international marriage agencies is often affiliated with web-based international dating sites that are able to market their services on a larger scale, in compliance with regulations such as the USA's International Marriage Broker Regulation Act. Experian, a market research firm, reports that the top 10 international dating sites attracted 12 million visitors in March 2013, up 29% from March 2012. International dating sites provide a wide variety of online communication, including instant messaging, email letters, webchat, phone translation, virtual gifts, live games, and mobile-based chat. International marriage agencies are frequently referred to as "mail-order bride" agencies. However, many consider the term "mail-order bride" derogatory and feel it demeans foreign women by comparing them to commodities for sale and by falsely implying that (unlike local women), they exercise no judgment over the men they meet and would marry anyone from a relatively wealthy country.

Services offered by marriage agencies typically include:

- Offering a catalog with verified women's profiles
- Introductions
- Platform for communication and interaction
- Translation of correspondence between clients not speaking a common language
- Excursions, in which a man is introduced to several women interested in marriage

== History ==
=== 17th and 18th centuries ===
==== British colonies ====
In 1620, the Virginia Company recruited mail-order brides for the Jamestown colony, sponsoring the emigration of 140 women in hopes of reducing desertion by the settlers and to avoid the men marrying women from the local Native American tribes. They were sometimes referred to as "tobacco wives", because each male colonist who married a mail-order bride had to reimburse the company for her passage at a cost of 120 pounds of "good leaf tobacco". The women who were brought over by the company were free to marry whomever they chose, even men who were too poor to pay their passage fee. The average age of these brides was 20.

==== French colonies ====
France took a similar tactic in the mid-1600s, recruiting and sponsoring approximately 800 women to immigrate to New France. These mail-order brides were known as the filles du roi (filles du roi or filles du roy in the spelling of the era). The New France colony followed the same patterns as Jamestown: male settlers returned home or married Native American women and left the colony to live with their wives' tribes. For the filles du roi, the government not only paid to recruit and transport them, it also provided each woman with a dowry of at least 50 livres. As with the "tobacco wives" of Jamestown, the filles du roi had the right to choose their partners and could refuse any suitor. Genetic studies of French Canadians have suggested that millions of people in Canada today are descended from the filles du roi.

When New France began its Louisiana colony in 1699, it requested more mail-order brides. These were known as Pelican girls (for the first ship that brought women to the colony, Le Pélican). This program was not successful; the women had been recruited with false descriptions of the struggling colony and had many complaints about their treatment. When women in France heard of the terrible conditions and of how the Pelican girls had been treated, the government was unable to recruit many more mail-order brides. France had to resort to shipping over thieves and prostitutes, known as "correction girls".

==== Portuguese colonies ====
The Órfãs do Rei (orphans of the king) were Portuguese girl orphans who were sent from Portugal to overseas colonies during the Portuguese Empire as part of Portugal's colonization efforts. The orphans were married to native rulers or Portuguese settlers. Their fathers were Portuguese men who died in battle for the king. Both noble and non-noble girls were in the órfãs do rei. Many were sent to the colony of Brazil, and they ranged from 12 to 30 years of age.

=== 19th and early 20th centuries ===
There are at least two historical roots of the mail-order bride industry that emerged in the 1800s in the American frontier: Asian workers in the frontier regions (although Asian workers were scattered throughout the world), and American men who had headed west across the United States to the frontier.

==== Asian immigrants ====
Asian men worked through mail-order agencies to find wives as they worked overseas in the 1800s. Key variables determining the relationship between migration and marriage were demographics, legal policies, cultural perceptions and technology. Imbalances between the number of available women and the number of men desiring partners created a demand for immigrant women. As a result of this imbalance, a new system of "picture brides" developed in predominantly male settlements. In the early 20th century, the institution of "picture brides" developed due to immigration restrictions. The Japanese-American Passport Agreement of 1907 allowed Japan to grant passports to the wives of immigrants to America. As immigration of unmarried Japanese women to America was effectively barred, the use of "picture brides" provided a mechanism for willing women to obtain a passport to America, while Japanese workers in America could gain a female helpmate of their own nationality.

==== European immigrants ====
European American men sought financial success in the migration West, but few women lived there at this time, so it was hard for these men to settle down and start a family. During the California gold rush in 1849, there were at least three men for every woman, and by 1852, the ratio had increased to nearly seven men for every woman. They attempted to attract women living back East; the men wrote letters to churches and published personal advertisements in magazines and newspapers. In return, the women would write to the men and send them photographs of themselves. Courtship was conducted by letter, until a woman agreed to marry a man she had never met. Many women wanted to escape their present way of living, gain financial security and see what life on the frontier could offer them. Most of these women were single, but some were widows, divorcées or runaways. Mail-order marriages gave Black women an escape from the crushing racial restrictions in the South. In 1885, a group of married Black women in Arizona Territory formed the Busy Bee Club to advertise for wives for Arizona miners, hoping to reduce violence in the mining camps and encourage Black women to move to the area.

To recruit mail-order brides for Oregon, area bachelors combined funds to send two brothers east. The Benton brothers began their search in Maryland, posting "Brides Wanted" flyers. They held meetings at which they described the territory and promised free passage west. More than 100 women accompanied the Bentons back to Oregon. Asa Mercer performed a similar recruiting role for Seattle. Only 11 women accompanied Mercer back on his first trip, but his second was more successful, with more than 100 women travelling to Seattle, accompanied by a New York Times journalist to chronicle the journey. These prospective brides were known as Mercer Girls.

British Columbia welcomed sixty women from Britain, mail-order brides recruited by the Columbia Emigration Society, in 1862. Another twenty women from Australia were bound for Victoria but were convinced to stay in San Francisco when their ship docked there.

In the early 20th century, answering matrimonial ads was a route to entering the United States after immigration limits became more restrictive. It was also a means of escaping war-torn regions. In 1922, two ships docked in New York with 900 mail-order brides from Eastern European countries such as Turkey, Romania, Armenia, and Greece, fleeing the Greco-Turkish War.

== Country-specific legal history ==
=== Belarus ===
In 2005, President Alexander Lukashenko attempted to regulate "marriage agencies" in Belarus and make it difficult for them to operate. However, since he failed to address the economic problems which have been the root cause of the issue, he has been unable to stop (or otherwise regulate) this activity.

=== Cambodia ===
Thousands of women from Cambodia were mail-order brides to men in South Korea. Viewing the practice as a form of human trafficking, in the 21st century, the Cambodian government passed a number of laws, such as prohibiting marriage between Cambodian women and men over the age of 50, a ban on marriage between Cambodian women and Korean men, and a ban on marriages with foreigners (which was rescinded after six months).

=== Canada ===
Canadian immigration laws concerning mail-order brides have traditionally been similar to (but slightly less restrictive than) their U.S. counterparts; for instance, previously not requiring the Canadian citizen to prove minimum-income requirements (as has been a long-standing requirement of United States immigration laws). While there is still no formal requirement for a minimum salary, the sponsor must provide evidence of income (such as the T4 income tax slip from an employer) with their IMM 5481 Sponsorship Evaluation. Until 2001, Canada's immigration policy designated mail-order brides under the "family class" to refer to spouses and dependents and "fiancé(e)" class for those intending to marry, with only limited recognition of externally married opposite-sex "common law" relationships; same-sex partners were processed as independent immigrants or under a discretionary provision for "humane and compassionate" considerations. In 2002, the Canadian Immigration Law was completely revised. One of the major changes was conjugal partner sponsorship, available for any two people (including same-sex couples) who have had conjugal relations, with "a significant degree of attachment" and "mutually interdependent relationship", for at least one year.

There have been reported instances in which foreign spouses have abandoned their Canadian sponsors upon arrival in Canada or soon thereafter, often collecting welfare, which the sponsor is obligated to repay. In some of the cases, federal immigration authorities have made no attempt to revoke fraudulently-obtained landed immigrant status or deport the claimants, treating cases where one spouse is duped by the other as low-priority and difficult to prove.

A two-year conditional residence requirement (like that in force in Australia and the United States) was proposed in 2011 and is now applied to new arrivals.

=== China ===
China is one of the main source countries of East Asian mail-order brides. Vietnamese women are traveling to China as mail-order brides for rural Han Chinese men to earn money for their families and a rise in the standard of living, matchmaking between Chinese men and Vietnamese women has increased and has not been affected by troubled relations between Vietnam and China. Some Vietnamese women from Lào Cai who married Han Chinese men stated that among their reasons for doing so was that Vietnamese men beat their wives, engaged in affairs with mistresses, and refused to help their wives with chores while Han men actively helped their wives carry out chores and care for them. Cambodian women also travel to China as mail order brides for rural men. In the majority of cases, young women are persuaded by friends and relatives with an offer, and at least 5 percent of Vietnamese women in marriages to Chinese men are victims of human trafficking. There is no established bilateral cooperation between China and Vietnam to deal with the problematic aspects of undocumented, transnational marriages, since the Chinese marriage market crisis has been significantly alleviated by female immigrants. Despite prohibition, illegal border crossing and de facto marriage are common and uncontrollable.

=== Colombia ===
According to immigration statistics from the United States Department of Homeland Security, Colombia has ranked in the top 10 of countries since 1999 from which fiancées have emigrated for the United States. As well, the number of Colombians being admitted to the United States between 1999 and 2008 using fiancé visas (including children) has increased 321 percent.

A dissertation by Jasney E. Cogua-Lopez, "Through the Prisms of Gender and Power: Agency in International Courtship between Colombian Women and American Men", suggests various reasons for this growth, including continuing cultural inequality between the sexes despite equality being codified in the country's laws (honor killings were not made completely illegal until 1980).

Because of the large number of Colombians wishing to leave their country by marrying foreigners, a black market for marriages to foreigners has developed, with some people allegedly paying as much as 20 million pesos ($10,000) to illegal groups.

According to Colombia Decrees No. 2668/88 and 1556/89, passed in 1988, foreigners are allowed to marry nationals in the country provided they supply the proper paperwork, including a birth certificate and proof that both parties are not already married. A notary is required, but because the laws are open to interpretation, the requirements can vary from notary to notary.

=== Japan ===
During the 1980s and 1990s, local authorities started government-led initiatives encouraging marriage between women from other Asian countries and Japanese farmers due to the lack of Japanese women who wanted to live in the countryside. These Asian brides came from the Philippines, Sri Lanka, Thailand, China and South Korea. The phenomenon of marrying women from other Asian countries later spread to urban parts of Japan as well.

=== Philippines ===
The Philippines prohibits the business of organizing or facilitating marriages between Filipinas and foreign men. The Philippine congress enacted the Anti Mail-Order Bride Law on 13 June 1990, as a result of stories in the local media about Filipinas being abused by their foreign husbands. Because of this, Filipinas often used "reverse publications" – publications in which men advertise themselves – to contact foreign men for marriage to Filipina women.

Successful prosecution under this statute is rare or non-existent as widespread deployment of the Internet in the mid-1990s brought a proliferation of websites operating outside the Philippines which legally remain beyond the reach of Filipino law. One Montana site profiled in an ABS-CBN News and Current Affairs report entitled "Pinay Brides" circumvented the restrictions by characterising its role as that of a travel agency. Thousands of Filipina women marry Americans each year.

=== South Korea ===
The New York Times reports, "Every month, hundreds of South Korean men fly to Vietnam, the Philippines, Nepal and Uzbekistan on special trips. An agent escorts each man to see many women in a single day, sometimes all gathered in the same hall". Although these marriages can be successful, in some cases immigrant wives are mistreated, misunderstood and separated from their Korean husbands. One method men use when choosing young girls as wives is "Like a judge in a beauty pageant, the man interviews the women, many of them 20 years younger than he, and makes a choice". The British newspaper The Independent reports, "Last year it was reported that more than 40,000 Vietnamese women have married South Korean men and migrated there." Cambodian women are also popular with Korean men seeking foreign brides, but in March 2010 the Cambodian government temporally banned marriages to South Korean men.

The Korea Times reports that every year, thousands of Korean men sign up for matches with Filipina brides through agencies and by mail order. Based on data from the Korean government, there are 6,191 Filipinas in South Korea who are married to Koreans. After contacting a mail-order agency, the majority of Filipina mail-order brides met their husbands by attending "show-ups", a meeting in which a group of Filipina women are brought to meet a Korean man who is looking for a wife. At the show-up the Korean man picks a prospective wife from among the group, and in a matter of days they are married.

An anthropological study on Filipina wives and Korean men by professor Kim Min-jung of the Department of Cultural Anthropology at Kangwon National University found that these Korean men find it difficult to marry Korean women, so they look for girls in poorer countries with difficult economic circumstances. The Korean men feel that because of the difficult circumstances from which the Filipina women come, cultural differences and the language barrier, they "will not run away". Further, she said, Korean men characterize Southeast Asian women as friendly, hardworking (due to agrarian backgrounds), "docile and obedient, able to speak English, and are familiar with Korean patriarchal culture".

A recent study by matchmaking firm Bien-Aller polled 274 single South Korean men through its website concerning motivations for marrying non-Korean women and found that men choose foreign brides primarily for one of four reasons. "According to the poll, 32.1 percent of the men said they felt the biggest benefit of marrying foreign women is their lack of interest in their groom's educational background and financial or social status. The next best reason was their belief that foreign brides would be submissive (23 percent), make their lives more comfortable (15.3 percent), and that the men would not have to get stressed about their in-laws (13.8 percent)."

The majority of mail order brides from China to South Korea consist of Chinese citizens of Korean ethnicity.

==== Violence against foreign brides in South Korea ====
In June 2013, The Philippine embassy in Seoul reported that it had received many complaints from Filipinas who have married Korean men through mail-order, frequently becoming "victims of grave abuses". The Philippine police rescued 29 mail-order brides on their way to marry South Korea men whom Chief Superintendent Reginald Villasanta, head of an organised crime task force, says were "duped into promises of an instant wealthy life through marriage with Korean gentlemen". The women were advertised in online and offline "catalogs" to South Korean men. In many cases however, victims were fed false information about the background of their future spouse and family, and suffered abuse from the South Korean men, which led to "abandonment of the marital home, separation and divorce", Villasanta said.

There have been several murders of mail-order brides in South Korea. On 24 May 2011, one South Korean man "stabbed his Vietnamese wife to death while the couple's 19-day-old baby lay next to her. The man, a farmer, had been matched up with his foreign bride through a broker. In 2010, another Vietnamese woman was killed by her husband a week after they were married. In 2008, a Vietnamese woman jumped from an apartment building to her death after being abused by her husband and mother-in-law."

In November 2009, Philippine Ambassador to South Korea Luis T. Cruz warned Filipina women against marrying Korean men. He said in recent months that the Philippine Embassy in Seoul has received complaints from Filipina wives of abuses committed by their Korean husbands that caused separation, divorce and abandonment. As language and cultural differences become an issue, the Filipina women are regarded as commodities bought for a price.

=== Malaysia ===
Mail-order brides travelled to Malaysia to marry Malaysian men. Mail-order brides include women from Vietnam, Indonesia, and China.

=== Singapore ===
Singapore has received Vietnamese women as mail order brides.

=== Taiwan ===
Vietnamese and Uzbek mail order brides have gone to Taiwan for marriage. Domestic violence and other problems that Vietnamese women faced during the marriages in Taiwan.

=== Turkmenistan ===
On 4 June 2001, Turkmenian President Saparmurat Niyazov (also known as Turkmenbashi) authorized a decree that required foreigners to pay a $50,000 fee to marry a Turkmen citizen (regardless of how they met), and to live in the country and own property for one year. Authorities indicated that the law was designed to protect women from being duped into abusive relationships. In June 2005, Niyazov scrapped the $50,000 and the property-owning requirements.

=== United States ===
U.S. immigration law provides protection for brides once they arrive. "In 1996, Congress passed the Illegal Immigration Reform and Responsibility Act... Section 652 of this legislation specifically addresses the mail-order bride industry".

On 6 January 2006, President George W. Bush signed the International Marriage Broker Regulation Act (IMBRA) as part of the Violence Against Women Act. In enacting IMBRA, Congress was responding to claims by the Tahirih Justice Center (TJC), a woman's advocacy group, that mail-order brides were susceptible to domestic abuse because they are unfamiliar with the laws, language and customs of their new home. The TJC insisted that special legislation was needed to protect them. The TJC asked Congress to consider several notable cases mentioned in the Congressional Record. Critics of IMBRA claim that the TJC failed to ask Congress to consider the relative amount of abuse between mail-order bride couples and other couples (including the thousands of spousal murders that occurred in the US over the past 15 years).

Two federal lawsuits (European Connections & Tours v. Gonzales, N.D. Ga. 2006; AODA v. Gonzales, S.D. Ohio 2006) sought to challenge IMBRA on constitutional grounds. The AODA case was terminated when the plaintiffs withdrew their claim. The European Connections case ended when the judge ruled against the plaintiff, finding the law constitutional regarding a dating company.

On 26 March 2007, U.S. District Judge Clarence Cooper dismissed with prejudice a suit for injunctive relief filed by European Connections, agreeing with Attorney General Alberto Gonzales and TJC that IMBRA is a constitutional exercise of Congressional authority to regulate for-profit dating websites and agencies where the primary focus is on introducing Americans to foreigners. Additionally, the federal court specifically found that: "the rates of domestic violence against immigrant women are much higher than those of the U.S. population". According to a compilation of disaggregated samples of Asian ethnicities from local communities, Asian women in the United States reported intimate physical and/or sexual violence of 21 to 55 percent in 2015. The judge also compared background checks on American men to background checks on firearm buyers by stating, "However, just as the requirement to provide background information as a prerequisite to purchasing a firearm has not put gun manufacturers out of business, there is no reason to believe that IMBs will be driven from the marketplace by IMBRA".

==== Legal issues ====
Marriage agencies are legal in almost all countries. On 6 January 2006, the United States Congress enacted IMBRA, which requires certain actions of some businesses prior to selling a foreign woman's address to a US citizen or resident or otherwise facilitating contact, including the following:

- The man must complete a questionnaire on his criminal and marital background
- The business must obtain the man's record from the United States National Sex Offenders Public Registry database
- The questionnaire and record must be translated into the woman's native language and provided to her
- The woman must certify that she agrees to permit communication
- A lifetime limit of two K-1 visas is imposed, with a waiver required for the approval of any subsequent fiancée visa

===== Visa regulations =====
To bring a spouse into the United States, Form I-130 must be filed, which is an immigrant petition on behalf of a relative. After that, a K-3/K-4 & V-1/V-2 Entry Visa for Spouse must be filed. The Immigration and Nationalization Service advises that "in some cases, it may be to a couple's advantage to pursue a K-1 fiancée visa before getting married. In other cases, applicants may find that it is more cost effective to get married abroad and then apply for an immigrant visa overseas. In many cases, the K-1 visa application process takes just as long as the immigrant visa process". The cost of the visa may be around $2000. Couples must remain together at least two years. There were 849,000 female naturalized citizens between the ages of 20 and 29 and 2,084,000 women of the same age living without U.S. citizenship in 2016, accounting for 13.3% of the female population of that age bracket. "Despite well over 2,000 mail-order marriages a year, there is no information on the amount of mail-order brides entering the United States. The purpose of this law is two-fold: to protect the safety of mail-order brides and to prevent fraud".

== See also ==
- Passport bro, typically a Western man who conducts his dating activity abroad
- Picture bride
- Romance scam
- Cherry Blossoms (marriage agency)

== Bibliography ==
- Boyajian, James C. (12 December 2007). Portuguese Trade in Asia Under the Habsburgs, 1580–1640. Baltimore, Maryland: Johns Hopkins University Press. ISBN 978-0-8018-8754-3.
- Coates, Timothy J. (2001). Convicts and Orphans: Forced and State-sponsored Colonizers in the Portuguese Empire, 1550-1755. Redwood City, California: Stanford University Press. ISBN 978-0-8047-3359-5.
- Constable, Nicole (2015). "Mail order brides". The International Encyclopedia of Human Sexuality. pp. 721–817. doi:10.1002/9781118896877.wbiehs276. ISBN 978-1-4051-9006-0.
- The Indonesian Quarterly. Vol. 2. Jakarta, Indonesia: Yayasan Proklamasi, Centre for Strategic and International Studies. 1973.
- Journal of Indian History. Vol. 58. Trivandrum, India: Department of History, University of Kerala. 1980.
- Maria, Bernard Sta (1982). My People, My Country. Malacca, Malaysia: Malacca Portuguese Development Centre Publications.
- More, J. B. Prashant; Manickam, M. (2001). Freedom movement in French India: the Mahe revolt of 1948. Kannur University, India: Institute for Research in Social Sciences and Humanities of MESHAR. ISBN 978-81-900166-9-8.
- Portuguese Studies Review (in Portuguese). Vol. 14. International Conference Group on Portugal. 2006.
- Sarkissian, Margaret (15 December 2000). D'Albuquerque's Children: Performing Tradition in Malaysia's Portuguese Settlement. Chicago: University of Chicago Press. ISBN 978-0-226-73498-9.
- Stephen, S. Jeyaseela (2006). Literature, Caste and Society: The Masks and Veils. Delhi, India: Kalpaz. ISBN 978-81-7835-448-4.
- Telfer, William (1932). The treasure of São Roque: a sidelight on the counter-reformation. London, UK: Society for Promoting Christian Knowledge.
