= International Marriage Broker Regulation Act =

2005 United States federal statute

The International Marriage Broker Regulation Act of 2005 (Subtitle D of Title VIII (Sections 831–834) of United States Public Law 109–162), or IMBRA, codified at 8 U.S.C. § 1375a(d), is a United States federal statute that requires background checks for all marriage visa sponsors and limits serial visa applications. Additionally, the law requires background checks for US citizens using marriage brokerage services focused primarily on providing dating services between US citizens or residents and foreign nationals for a fee. The impetus for its introduction were the Susanna Blackwell case in 1995 and the Anastasia King case in 2000, in which foreign women had been abused and murdered by men who had used a K-1 fiancée visa issued by the U.S. State Department to bring them to the United States. In the King case, the husband had physically abused a previous foreign bride before murdering Anastasia. King had met Anastasia through his own advertisement in a Moscow newspaper (not through an international marriage broker). In the Blackwell case, the husband had a clean record, therefore IMBRA would not have prevented her murder. It was intended to stop abuse of mail order brides by prospective husbands with criminal histories. IMBRA met with opposition from international dating companies when it was first introduced. Some industry executives claim the industry has grown to appreciate it to ensure the safety of its female clients.

Executives from industry leader A Foreign Affair have remarked that these changes have been beneficial for men and women.

== Key provisions ==
=== Marketing of children prohibited ===
International marriage brokers (IMBs) are prohibited from providing personal contact information, photographs, or other information about anyone under the age of 18 to any individual or entity (section 833(d)(1)).

=== Duty to disclose criminal history and marital history and obtain written consent ===
For a fee, before an international marriage broker provides a foreign national client's personal contact information to a United States client, the international marriage broker must:

1. search sex offender public registries for information regarding the United States client;
2. collect certain criminal and marital background information through documentation or an attestation from the United States client;
3. provide to the foreign national client any records retrieved from the sex offender public registry search and the background information collected in the foreign client's primary language;
4. provide to the foreign national client a government-prepared information pamphlet about the legal rights and resources available in the U.S. to immigrant victims of domestic violence and other crimes; and
5. obtain the foreign national client's signed, written consent to the release of the foreign client's information to the United States client (sections 833(d)(2) and (3)).

=== Penalty for misuse of information ===
Any person who knowingly misuses any information obtained by an international marriage broker under IMBRA (i.e., uses that information for any unauthorized purpose other than IMBRA's required disclosures) is subject to a fine or imprisonment of not more than 1 year, or both, in addition to other possible penalties that may be imposed under federal or state law (sections 833(d)(3)(C)).

=== Penalties for other violations/nonpreemption ===
An international marriage broker is subject to a civil penalty of between $5,000 and $25,000 per violation or attempted violation of its obligations under IMBRA, and criminal penalties for not more than five years in prison. This is in addition to other possible penalties and remedies that may be provided for under federal law or state law (sections 833(d)(5) and (6)).

=== Definition of an international marriage broker ===
"International marriage broker" is defined as an entity (whether or not U.S.-based) that charges fees for providing matchmaking services or social referrals between U.S. citizens/permanent residents and foreign nationals. The definition also exempts non-profit religious or cultural matchmaking services, and dating services that do not match U.S. citizens/residents with aliens as their principal business and that charge comparable rates and offer comparable services to all clients, regardless of gender or country of citizenship.

=== Informational pamphlet about legal rights and resources ===
IMBRA requires the U.S. Department of Homeland Security (DHS), in consultation with the Departments of State (DOS) and Justice (DOJ) and nongovernmental organizations with specialized expertise, to develop a pamphlet for foreign fiancé(e)s and spouses about the K visa immigration process, the legal rights and resources available to immigrant victims of domestic violence and other crimes, the illegality of marriage fraud (i.e., knowingly entering a marriage solely to obtain an immigration benefit) and U.S. legal obligations regarding child support. The pamphlet will also include a warning concerning the potential use of K visas by U.S. citizens with a history of violence, whose acts may not have resulted in a criminal record; as well as a notification regarding international marriage brokers' obligations to disclose U.S. clients' violent criminal records.

=== Criminal background disclosure to foreign fiancé(e) or spouse ===
IMBRA requires U.S. citizens petitioning to sponsor K visas to disclose convictions for a list of violent crimes on the "I-129F" petition form that they file with the Department of Homeland Security, including convictions for domestic violence and assault & battery, as well as convictions for elder abuse, child abuse or neglect, and stalking; and multiple (three or more) convictions for offenses related to alcohol/controlled substances. The Department of Homeland Security must provide the Department of State with a copy of the petitioner's I-129F petition form, together with any criminal background information (including information on protection orders) that the Department of Homeland Security has gathered on the petitioner under existing authority. The Department of State must provide these materials to the foreign fiancé(e) or spouse. The U.S. consular officer conducting the K visa interview overseas must inform the foreign fiancé(e) or spouse that this information may not be complete, and ask him or her whether an international marriage broker facilitated his or her relationship with the petitioner and, if so, which one, and whether the international marriage broker complied with IMBRA by providing him or her with the required disclosures and information (sections 832(a), 833(a)(5), and 833(b)(1)).

=== Limits placed on number of fiancé(e) visa petitions ===
IMBRA limits a U.S. petitioner's sponsorship of K-1 fiancé(e) visas to 2 total, with no less than 2 years between the filing of the last approved petition and the current petition. A petitioner may seek a discretionary waiver of these limits from the Department of Homeland Security. However, the Department of Homeland Security cannot ordinarily waive the limits if the U.S. petitioner has a record of violent criminal offenses (section 832(a)(1); 8 U.S.C. § 1184(d)(2)).
