= One-e-App =

One-e-App is a Web-based system that lets families and individuals apply for multiple health, social service and other support programs from one location. One-e-App is used by consumers themselves or by staff who assist families and individuals at community clinics, hospitals, state and county agencies, food banks and other locations. The system allows individuals to apply for a range of programs such as Medicaid, CHIP, Food Stamps (SNAP), Earned Income Tax Credit, Child Tax Credit, utility assistance, local health insurance expansion programs and more. One-e-App uses Mashup technology to integrate with county, state and other systems to permit electronic submission of applications, supporting documents and signatures.

== History ==
One-e-App is used in Arizona (launched as Health-e-Arizona in 2002), California, Indiana (launched as Ind-e-App in 2003) and Maryland (launched in Howard County in 2008 as Health-e-Link, changed to Healthy Maryland in 2011). One-e-App is used in 14 California counties: Alameda, Fresno, Humboldt, Los Angeles, Napa, Orange, Sacramento, San Diego, San Francisco, San Joaquin, San Mateo, Santa Clara, Santa Cruz, and Sonoma. Nine million applications for public and private benefits have been generated in Arizona, California, Indiana, and Maryland.

An independent study of One-e-App conducted by The Lewin Group, found One-e-App reduces the time it takes to complete and process an application, increases efficiency for application assistors, and increases assistor satisfaction.

One-e-App technology is built on service-oriented architecture (SOA), which is consistent with the direction being promoted by the Federal government through the Medicaid Information Technology Architecture (MITA).

Enrollment programs One-e-App currently supports applications for the following programs:

- Medicaid
- Children's Health Insurance Program
- My Health LA (MHLA)
- Food Stamps (SNAP)
- Earned Income Tax Credit (EITC)
- County Indigent Care Programs
- Hospital Charity Care and Sliding Fee Scale Programs
- Early Periodic Screening Diagnosis and Treatment
- Kaiser Permanente Child Health Plan and Bridge Program
- Supplemental Nutrition for Women, Infants, and Children (WIC)
- Temporary Assistance for Needy Families (TANF)
- Medicare Cost Sharing Program
- CaliforniaKids (CalKids)
- Low Cost Auto Insurance Program
- Child Tax Credit
- Utility assistance programs

One-e-App is developed and managed by Social Interest Solutions (SIS), which rebranded as Alluma in 2019. Alluma is a non-profit organization creating solutions that are web-based and self-service, enabling their clients to offer applications online for a range of public supports and services.
