= Healthy Way LA =

Health care program

Healthy Way LA (HWLA) was a free public health care program available to underinsured or uninsured, low-income residents of Los Angeles County from 2007 until 2014. The program, administered by the Los Angeles County Department of Health Services (LADHS), was a Low Income Health Program (LIHP) approved under the Section 1115 Medicaid Waiver. HWLA was succeeded by My Health LA, a no-cost health care program which ran from 2014 until 2024, when access to Medi-Cal was expanded.

HWLA helped to narrow the large gap in access to health care among low-income populations by extending health care insurance to uninsured LA County residents living at 0 percent to 133 percent of the Federal Poverty Level (FPL). Individuals eligible for HWLA were assigned to a medical home within the Department of Health Services or its partners, thus gaining access to continuous primary care, preventive and specialty services, mental health services, and other support systems. HWLA was one of the few sources of coordinated health care for disadvantaged adults without dependents in LA County.

== History ==
California's LIHP was a health care coverage program for low-income, uninsured adults. The program began in 2010 and was an extension of the original 2007 Coverage Initiative from the previous Section 1115 Medicaid Waiver. LIHPs operate at the local level and are administered by the LADHS.6 As the country awaits the full implementation of the Patient Protection and Affordable Care Act (PPACA) in 2014, LIHPs in California assist counties in providing insurance for their uninsured population. HWLA was the local LIHP for those eligible in LA County. It began enrollment in 2007 in accordance with the terms of the previous Section 1115 Medicaid Waiver, as part of the “Coverage Initiative” for low-income uninsured adults. HWLA provides health care coverage expansion to uninsured individuals and attempts to stabilize safety net provider systems. With the insurance mandate included in the PPACA, HWLA was scheduled to end upon the implementation of the PPACA in 2014. HWLA and other LIHPs receive funding from California's “Bridge to Reform” Section 1115 Medicaid Demonstration Waiver. The waiver produces up to $7.7 billion in federal matching funds for Medicaid available over 5 years. LIHPs have two program components: the Medicaid Coverage Expansion (MCE) and the Health Care Coverage Initiative (HCCI). Each county has the option of either choosing to cover only MCE individuals who are below 133 percent of FPL or both MCE and HCCI adults who have family incomes between 133 percent and 200 percent of FPL (or a lower limit determined by the county).8 When the PPACA's health care coverage expansions come into effect, MCE adults will transition to Medicaid with 100 percent of federal matching. Most HCCI adults will be covered under Covered California, the State's Health Benefit Exchange.

== Program features ==
HWLA enables enrollees to choose a medical home from a list of clinics and health centers operated by the LADHS or its community partners. Patients receive continuous and coordinated care by a team of providers within their medical home and have access to both primary and specialty care services. As HWLA members, enrollees may also receive health care services at other Los Angeles health centers, hospitals, ambulatory care centers, and clinics within the HWLA network. Nonemergency care received outside of the HWLA network or outside Los Angeles County was not covered by HWLA.

Patients meeting the following requirements are eligible for HWLA:

- Uninsured health status
- US citizenship or legal permanent residence for at least 5 years
- Los Angeles County residency
- Age of 19 to 64
- Monthly family income at or below 133 percent FPL
- Not currently pregnant
- Not eligible for Medi-Cal or Healthy Families

Individuals receiving health care services and HIV care by Ryan White (RW) or the AIDS Drug Assistance Program (ADAP) may also be eligible to enroll in HWLA.

=== Healthcare benefits ===
HWLA enrollees have access to both outpatient and inpatient services at no cost. Primary care and preventive services are provided, as well as access for referrals to a range of specialty services, a nurse support telephone line, interpreter services and acute care services. A large emphasis has been placed on providing access to mental health services, which are also available to enrollees.

Summary of HWLA benefits:

- Regular and continuous access to health care providers
- Comprehensive care via a medical home in a preferred geographic location
- Primary care services
- Specialty clinic referrals
- Comprehensive preventive services
- Care Management Services for chronic illnesses
- Emergency care
- Urgent care services
- Access to Drug prescription pharmacies
- Health education and information
- Mental health Services
- Translation services
- Access to nurse support telephone services
- Access to up-to-date health information

Health services not covered by HWLA include dental services, cosmetic and plastic surgery, infertility treatments, immunizations for work or travel, non-medical devices, physicals for work or sports, and investigational treatments.

=== HWLA clinics ===
HWLA clinics can be found in the following regions within LA County: Antelope Valley, East L.A, Metro/Downtown LA, Northeast LA, San Fernando Valley, San Gabriel Valley, South Bay, South LA, Southwest LA, and Westside.

== Program enrollment ==
HWLA does not have an enrollment cap. As of October 2012, kHWLA had 205,442 enrollees, which was approximately a quarter of LA County's uninsured population at the time. Of these enrollees, 205,257 were MCE enrollees and 185 were HCCI enrollees. The gender distribution of HWLA membership has changed substantially since 2009, when women constituted almost 70% of all HWLA members. The largest age subgroups in HWLA as of January 2013 were the 45-54 and 55-64 age groups, which together constitute over 50% of all HWLA members. In early 2013, the ethnic and racial composition of HWLA members was 39.1% Latino, 25.7% African American, 14.7% White, 5.3% Asian, 0.3% Native American, and 15.1% other or unknown. The racial and ethnic distribution of HWLA membership differs considerably from the expected enrollment as outlined in the Los Angeles County Coverage Initiative Proposal. The Department of Health Services anticipated a greater number of Latino enrollees and significantly underestimated the enrollment of African Americans. As of August 2012, the DHS had processed 667,130 primary care visits for HWLA members. Compared to previous years, community partner clinics experienced an increase in the total number of clinic visits and in reimbursements from the DHS. Overall, the DHS and community partners succeeded in enrolling and serving the health care needs of more individuals than in previous years.

== HWLA and Ramsell Partnership ==
Ramsell is a provider of solutions for institutions that offer services for the underserved. Ramsell was a HWLA partner and has implemented 340B drug pricing programs and pharmacy administration services for individuals living with HIV/AIDS.

Ramsell has employed a comprehensive 340B solution to assist HWLA and its HIV focused clinics, patients, and medical homes. 340B drug pricing programs require drug manufacturers to provide outpatient drugs to eligible health care organizations at reduced prices. Ramsell has also built a specialized contract pharmacy network that ensures access and significant savings on HIV/AIDS medications whose average costs per year are between $12,000 to $20,000. These savings allow LA County to manage the expenses associated with HIV medications and increase access to additional medical services not provided by the state ADAP. The use of a contract pharmacy model aims to address challenges eligible providers faced in the past to provide patients with adequate access to discounted drug programs.

== HWLA and The Mental Health Integration Program (MHIP) ==
The Mental Health Integration Program (MHIP) is a county-wide patient-centered, integrated program that serves clients with mental health needs. MHIP is a mandated component of LIHP and is available to all individuals in HWLA who meet the mental health requirements. The program provides mental health screenings and treatments and uses an evidence- and outcome-based model of collaborative care to treat mental health conditions. Mental health is delivered through an existing network of directly operated and contracted specialty mental health clinics in LA county in three “tiers” of care. The first tier offers a full range of rehabilitation services and is intended for clients with serious mental illness. The second tier offers evidence-based practices, short-term treatment plans, and psychiatric consultations intended for individuals seen in primary care settings. The third tier offers psychiatric consultations for individuals who receive and desire only medication management. Patients in need of more intensive services are treated in community mental health centers that collaborate with primary care clinics in order to provide person-centered integrated mental health care.

== Challenges ==
When the implementation of HWLA began in September 2007, initial enrollment in the program was lower than projected. As of February 21, 2009, HWLA enrollment totaled only 25,858 individuals, about 23 percent of their initial goal. One of the factors contributing to the early low enrollment was the Deficit Reduction Act (DRA), which required the verification of an applicant's citizenship and income levels for HWLA enrollment. Clinics voiced concern that potential applicants would be deterred by the DRA requirements and would not enroll despite their need for care. As a result of the DRA requisites, HWLA organizers had to lower the enrollment goal from 114,000 to 94,000 and allocate funds to aid applicants in obtaining birth certificates.

In addition, administrative difficulties have made the enrollment process more daunting for potential HWLA enrollees. The unavailability of translated documents, challenges arranging medical appointments, and overwhelming patient and provider paperwork have been cited as aspects of HWLA in need of improvement.

Finally, the County's weak health information technology (HIT) infrastructure has caused poor coordination and continuity of care. Responsible for creating an electronic medical records (EMR) system, HIT is tasked with improving the coordination and continuity of health information. However, there have been inconsistencies in the methods used by clinics to identify patients and record medical information. As a result, the process of creating a unified county health network has been slowed, physicians are not able to access medical records efficiently, and the delivery of care is delayed.

== Public health implications of HWLA ==
HWLA was one of the primary methods to prepare Los Angeles and the California Medi-Cal system at large for upcoming expansions related to the PPACA. In 2014, HWLA, along with other similar programs in LIHP, will transition its enrollees into a health insurance product specified under the PPACA. MCE enrollees will transition into Medi-Cal (California's Medicaid program), and HCCI enrollees will transition to Covered California (California's Health Benefit Exchange). An estimated 2.13 million Californians will be newly eligible for Medi-Cal under the PPACA in 2014, which includes HWLA enrollees. HWLA was viewed as a key strategy to integrate the health care safety net in Los Angeles into the post-PPACA landscape. The program increases the likelihood of continuous care when MCE individuals enroll in Medi-Cal as these individuals are more likely to use DHS and community partner services after 2014. Community partners include medical clinics that have collaborated with HWLA to provide services to members. Members are expected to continue using HWLA providers because they have developed better methods of providing culturally and linguistically sensitive care. Providers have also improved coordination with other social safety net services, such as housing and transportation assistance.

HWLA aims to assist safety net providers in improving care delivery and in becoming partners with Medi-Cal and the California Health Benefit Exchange in 2014. There is evidence that HWLA has resulted in enhanced care management and utilization among high-needs individuals with specific chronic conditions, homeless individuals, and frequent emergency department users.

HWLA has health implications outside of the PPACA as well. According to LADHS, enrolling MCE eligible individuals into HWLA improves their current access to services, results in additional federal funding for their care, and helps the county develop strategies for accessing these individuals.

== See also ==
- Healthcare in California
- Healthcare availability for undocumented immigrants in the United States
- Immigrant health care in the United States
- Los Angeles County Department of Health Services
