= Undocumented youth in the United States =

Minors without legal immigration status

Young illegal aliens in the United States of America are young people living in the U.S.A. illegally. An estimated 1.1 million undocumented minors resided in the U.S. as of 2010, making up 10% of the undocumented population of 11 million. By 2012, it had increased to approximately 16% of the undocumented population. Undocumented students face unique legal uncertainties and limitations within the United States educational system. They are sometimes called the 1.5 generation (as opposed to first- or second-generation), as they have spent a majority of their lives in the United States.

Children have the legal right to a public K–12 education regardless of immigration status due to the 1982 US Supreme Court ruling in Plyler v. Doe. After navigating through primary education, undocumented youth transition into an early adulthood that does not grant them those provisions. Although some undocumented students find their way to legal status, many remain undocumented. Undocumented youth experience a period of adapting to a new identity (being "illegal") that is stigmatized. Coming of age, many undocumented minors become negatively distinguished from their peers because of their inability to work legally, obtain a driver's license, or participate in post-secondary education. These limitations with regard to citizenship frequently prove to be obstacles to the person's opportunity for social and civic engagement. Deferred Action for Childhood Arrivals (DACA) is a program that gives undocumented individuals the ability to be legally present in the United States, giving them an SSN and a work permit.

== Legislation affecting undocumented youth ==
The undocumented population of the United States faces unique legal uncertainties and limitations, especially in the pursuit of education. Undocumented students have been awarded some rights due to the 1982 Supreme Court ruling on Plyler v. Doe, but post-secondary education remains uncertain for many undocumented minors. The Personal Responsibility and Work Opportunity Reconciliation Act and the Immigration Reform and Immigrant Responsibility Act, both of the Clinton administration, added more barriers for undocumented minors attempting to receive post-secondary education. The Development, Relief, and Education for Alien Minors Act in 2010, on the other hand, gave undocumented minors a path towards legal immigration status. Deferred Action for Childhood Arrivals followed close behind in 2012; President Obama signed an executive branch memorandum deferring immigration enforcement for minors meeting specific requirements. Some minors benefit from these legislative efforts, eventually gaining legal immigration status, while many remain undocumented.

=== Plyler v. Doe ===
The Court found that where states limit the rights afforded to people (specifically children) based on their status as immigrants, this limitation must be examined under an intermediate scrutiny standard to determine whether it furthers a substantial goal of the state.

Prior to 1975, all students in Texas were able to attend public elementary and secondary school. The state government provided funding to schools based on the number of students enrolled. In May 1975, the state legislature amended the Texas Education Code to provide that only U.S. citizens or lawfully admitted non-citizens would be counted for financial aid purposes. Schools were given the option to allow or reject undocumented students and to charge tuition if they chose to accept them. School officials in Tyler, Texas, under the direction of Superintendent James Plyler, began charging $1,000 annual tuition to all undocumented students—about 60 from a student body of 1,600. In September 1977, the Mexican American Legal Defense and Educational Fund (MALDEF) filed a class action on behalf of sixteen undocumented Mexican students of the Tyler district.

The trial court found that the Texas law violated the Equal Protection Clause of the Fourteenth Amendment to the United States Constitution because it amounted to a total deprivation of education without a rational basis. The court rejected the state's arguments regarding the cost of educating undocumented children, finding that the federal government largely subsidized the additional costs that the education of these children entailed and that "it is not sufficient justification that a law saves money."

In order to comply with Plyler, education policy analysts have suggested that schools may not:

- deny admission to a student on the basis of undocumented status;
- treat a student fundamentally differently from others when determining residency;
- engage in practices that frighten undocumented students and their families away from school access;
- require students or parents to disclose or document immigration status;
- make inquiries of students or parents that may expose their undocumented status;
- require Social Security numbers from any student.

Plyler does not extend to post-secondary education but guarantees undocumented students the opportunity to receive a high school degree or equivalent certification.

=== Personal Responsibility and Work Opportunity Reconciliation Act of 1996 (PRWORA) ===
The Personal Responsibility and Work Opportunity Reconciliation Act of 1996 (PRWORA) was President Bill Clinton's major welfare reform. PRWORA is most known for the creation of the Temporary Assistance for Needy Families (TANF) program. Additionally, PRWORA set the standards for how courts and institutions determined the eligibility of federal, state, and local benefits and services. The reform states those who are not "qualified aliens" are ineligible for federal public benefits. The act also gives states the discretionary power to determine the tuition rates of publicly funded schools and the authority to provide state financial aid. If states do not pass specific legislation regarding these matters, then federal legislation supersedes and inherently prohibits state financial aid for unauthorized immigrants.

=== Immigration Reform and Immigrant Responsibility Act of 1996 (IIRIRA) ===
In 1996, to expand the restrictions of PRWORA, Congress approved the Immigration Reform and Immigrant Responsibility Act of 1996 (IIRIRA) to tighten immigration law in the United States. Section 505 of IIRIRA prohibits public higher education institutions from making eligible those who are unlawfully present in the United States for post-secondary education benefits that U.S. citizens or nationals, regardless of state residency, are also eligible for. The act was enacted in 1997. States complied with the mandates while overcoming the restrictions by basing eligibility for in-state tuition on factors other than state residence. For example, whether the student had attended a high school in the state as opposed to being a legal resident of the state.

=== Development, Relief, and Education for Alien Minors Act (DREAM) ===
The Development, Relief, and Education for Alien Minors (DREAM) Act is a federal bill that would permit states to determine state residency for higher education or military purposes. This bill was first introduced in the Senate on August 1, 2001, and was most recently reintroduced in Congress on March 26, 2009. A Senate filibuster blocked it on December 18, 2010. It would provide a mechanism for undocumented students of good moral character to become legal permanent residents. The DREAM Act initially allowed beneficiaries to qualify for federal student aid but was changed into the 2010 version of the bill. In order to be eligible, individuals must have come to the U.S. as children (under the age of 16), graduated from a U.S. high school, and be a long-term resident (at least 5 years). An age cap of 35 was also set. The latest version of the DREAM Act does not grant legal immigrant status to anyone for at least two years. Previous versions of the act would have immediately granted legal immigrant status to eligible individuals. Many other limitations were also included in this latest version, among them the removal of access to healthcare benefits and limits to chain migration.

=== Deferred Action for Childhood Arrivals (DACA) ===
On June 15, 2012, the Department of Homeland Security (DHS) announced the executive (President Obama and his administration) decision to defer immigration enforcement for undocumented youth who meet specific requirements set under the Deferred Action for Childhood Arrivals (DACA) plan. This order provided temporary relief from immigration enforcement and deportation proceedings, as well as the authorization to work. The Secretary of Homeland Security, Janet Napolitano, released a memorandum to the U.S. Customs and Border Patrol, U.S. Citizenship and Immigration Services, and U.S. Immigration and Customs Enforcement, stating that immigration laws should be enforced sensibly and with consideration to the individual situation. In the case of these young people living in the U.S., she stated that they had no intent on breaking any law and should have the opportunity to be productive people in this country.

Individuals may request DACA if they meet the following requirements:

- Under the age of 31 as of June 15, 2012 (at least 15 years or older at the time of application);
- Came to the United States before the age of 16;
- Have continuously lived in the United States since June 15, 2007, up to the present time;
- Were physically present in the United States on June 15, 2012, and at the time of making a request for consideration of deferred action with USCIS;
- Had no lawful status on June 15, 2012;
- Are currently in school, have graduated or obtained a certificate of completion from high school, have obtained a general education development (GED) certificate, or are an honorably discharged veteran of the Coast Guard or Armed Forces of the United States; and
- Have not been convicted of a felony, significant misdemeanor, or three or more other misdemeanors, and do not otherwise pose a threat to national security or public safety.

Applicants who meet the guidelines are granted a two-year reprieve and are granted work authorization. An estimated 1.8 million undocumented youth are eligible for deferred action. As of August 2013, 557,000 immigrants applied for deferred action, and 400,562 have been approved. In reaction to the executive order, some states, such as Arizona and Nebraska, announced that they would not prescribe state benefits, such as granting driver's licenses to recipients. The majority of states announced that they would grant driver's licenses to recipients, along with Michigan and Iowa, who reversed their decisions to deny state benefits. Without permanent residence, youth granted deferred action still cannot receive federal financial aid. Access to secondary education is still limited, but youth who are granted the ability to work have the potential for increased wages and the ability to pay tuition costs.

According to the Migration Policy Institute, approximately two million people are eligible for the DACA program, as the program's rules currently stand. In 2014 President Obama announced an expansion of DACA, removing the maximum age limit, changing the entry date to 2010, and extending the deferment period to three years. This extended program could potentially allow an additional 300 thousand people eligibility. As of 2016, the expansion was placed on hold due to a court injunction in United States v. Texas.

Although DACA is thought of as legislation that provides a pathway to citizenship or as a way of receiving lawful immigration status, neither is true. The deferment only provides the qualified recipients with a lawful presence, meaning the authorities cannot force them to leave the country although they still lack legal immigration status. DACA statuses can be terminated or not renewed based on the discretion of DHS, as it is not a law. DACA is an executive branch memorandum, which also means that it can change based on future presidents. Therefore, DACA creates open space for undocumented students to qualify for post-secondary education benefits. As of June 18, 2020, the Supreme Court has ruled that the Trump Administration cannot legally repeal the program, writing that the "DHS's decision to rescind DACA was arbitrary and capricious".

=== Uncertain Future for Undocumented Youth ===
It is estimated that there are about 3.6 million Dreamers in the United States, but only 533,00 Dreamers who are DACA recipients. As of December 2025, USCIS is accepting new applications for DACA, but those applications are not being processed; these DACA cases are on pause, awaiting a judge to rule in favor of DACA. It is estimated that about 100,000 dreamers have applied for DACA, but their cases have not been processed. At this time, USCIS is only processing renewal applications for individuals who are already DACA recipients. USCIS is not processing new applications because there is currently a court case in which the state of Texas and other states are suing and arguing that DACA is a financial burden to their state. Therefore, until a resolution is reached, there are new DACA recipients, and current DACA recipients await to see what the future holds for them.

== Demographics ==
According to Analysis of Undocumented Life written by Shannon Gleeson and Roberto Gonzales, in 2010 there were an estimated 1.1 million undocumented minors residing in the U.S., making up 10% of the total undocumented population of 11 million. By 2012, that number had increased to 16% of the total population.

It can be inferred that statistics would be very closely related to those for the unauthorized immigrant population as a whole. Since 2014, approximately 11.1 million such immigrants live in the United States, which has seen only a small increase since 2007. Approximately 16-17%, roughly two million, of these immigrants are under the age of 18; about 65 thousand graduate from high school each year, and only 5–10% of them continue to higher education.

While the undocumented student population comes from all over the world, a majority come from Mexico and other Central American countries, with approximately 6.7 million coming from Mexico. The second-largest demographic is students from Asia. In 2012, the Philippine undocumented population in the U.S. consisted of approximately 310,000 people, and there were 260,000 such immigrants from India. Although regularly left out of the conversation, Asians are a significant population in the undocumented community. The cultural expectations of immigrants in these communities often influence a more silenced and hidden existence than other cultures. There tends to be a heavier stigma against those who are undocumented, even within the culture.

== Impact of immigration enforcement ==
Karla Cornejo Villavicencio's book Undocumented Americans documents the struggles faced by the undocumented youth in the United States and the undocumented community at large when dealing with physical and psychological distress. The undocumented community may not be able to obtain health insurance through their employers or have the ability to purchase private health insurance. They rely heavily on alternative forms of medicine, including medicinal herbs or attending Vodou or Santeria rituals. The undocumented community also depends on certain local pharmacies that provide medication at discounted prices. In Cornejo's book, she highlights instances where undocumented individuals faced terminal illnesses and were turned away by medical institutions due to being uninsured and unable to pay out of pocket. Subsequently, forcing them to rely on alternative forms of medicine as a last resort.

These obstacles show how urgently supportive, inclusive learning environments and policies that address the wider social and health effects on undocumented students as well as access to higher education are needed.

=== Stigma ===
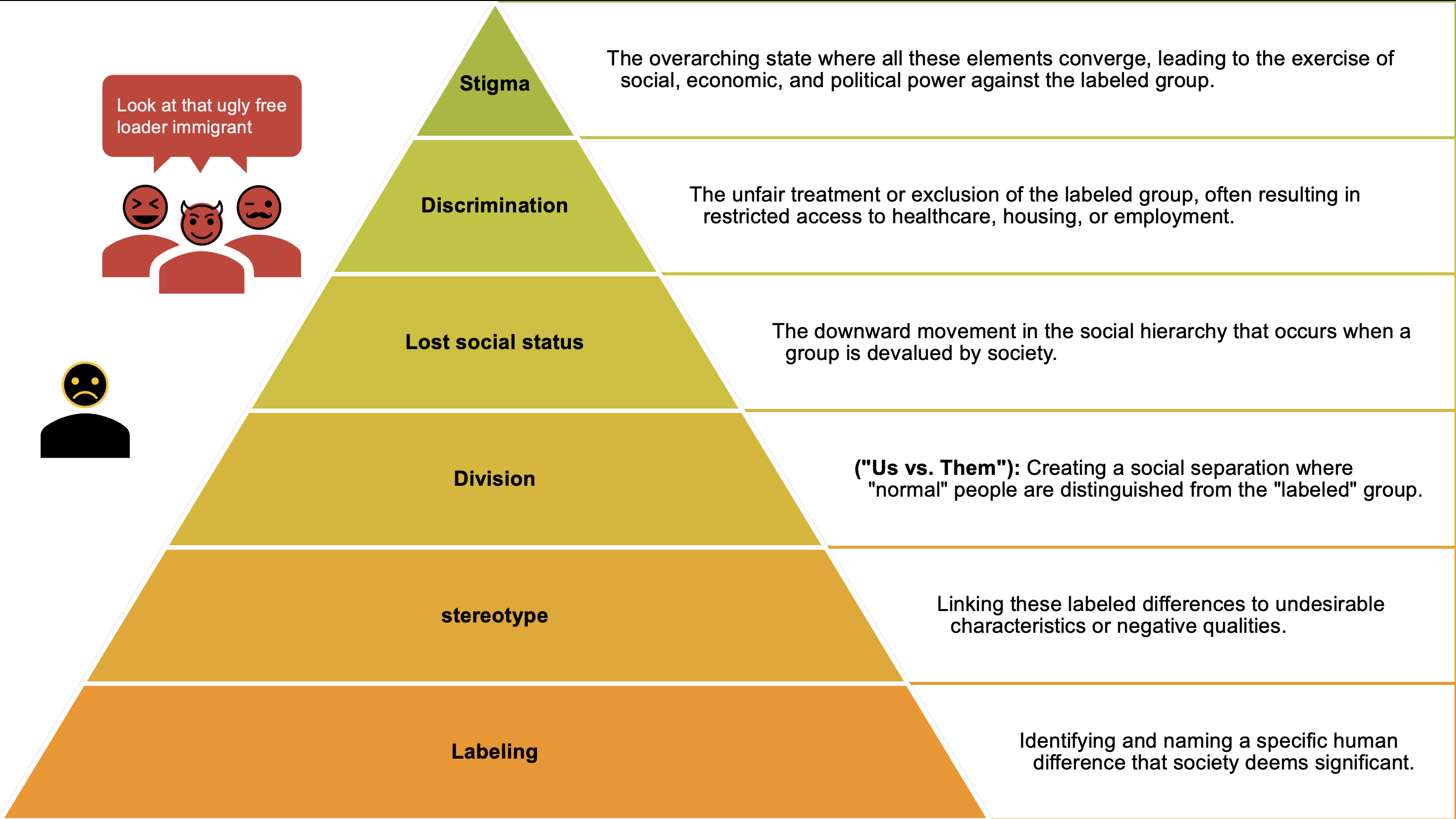
Social stigma and its mechanics

Stigma affects undocumented youth in the United States significantly. The stigma that undocumented youth face, starting from a very young age, has been shown to have serious effects on their well-being. An immigrant's "transition from the world of youthful innocence—of school and friends, clubs, sports, and dances—to the tenuous circumstances of clandestine adult life was jarring." Undocumented youth are excluded from driving, traveling, or getting a job, which would usually be normal and relatively easy life experiences for someone who was born in the United States. For undocumented youth, it causes a significant amount of stress.

By knowing the stressors that immigrant youth are confronted with, it can help us understand how these stressors affect their mental and overall well-being in the short term and the long term. The mental well-being of undocumented immigrants is impacted by the amount of "ontological security" they have or lack thereof. According to Vaquera, ontological security is the confidence that most people have in the consistency of their social and physical surroundings, which, unfortunately, is not something that most undocumented immigrants have access to. Most undocumented youth have no choice but to go through life with minimal social support. They often face judgment for seeking any assistance, as they are usually seen as outsiders.

Even just "perceptions of discrimination" are closely tied to mental strain and pressure. The more they lack social resources, the more likely they are to endure the challenges that perceived discrimination can cause. Undocumented youth face challenges such as dealing with housing, community, and job market situations. As well as being unable to access social support systems like healthcare. These obstacles can cause psychological, chronic stress at a young age, which is extremely dangerous. Many undocumented immigrants describe "the mental and emotional distress of verbal abuse, name-calling, and financial stress; and difficulties escaping these conditions."

== Youth activism ==
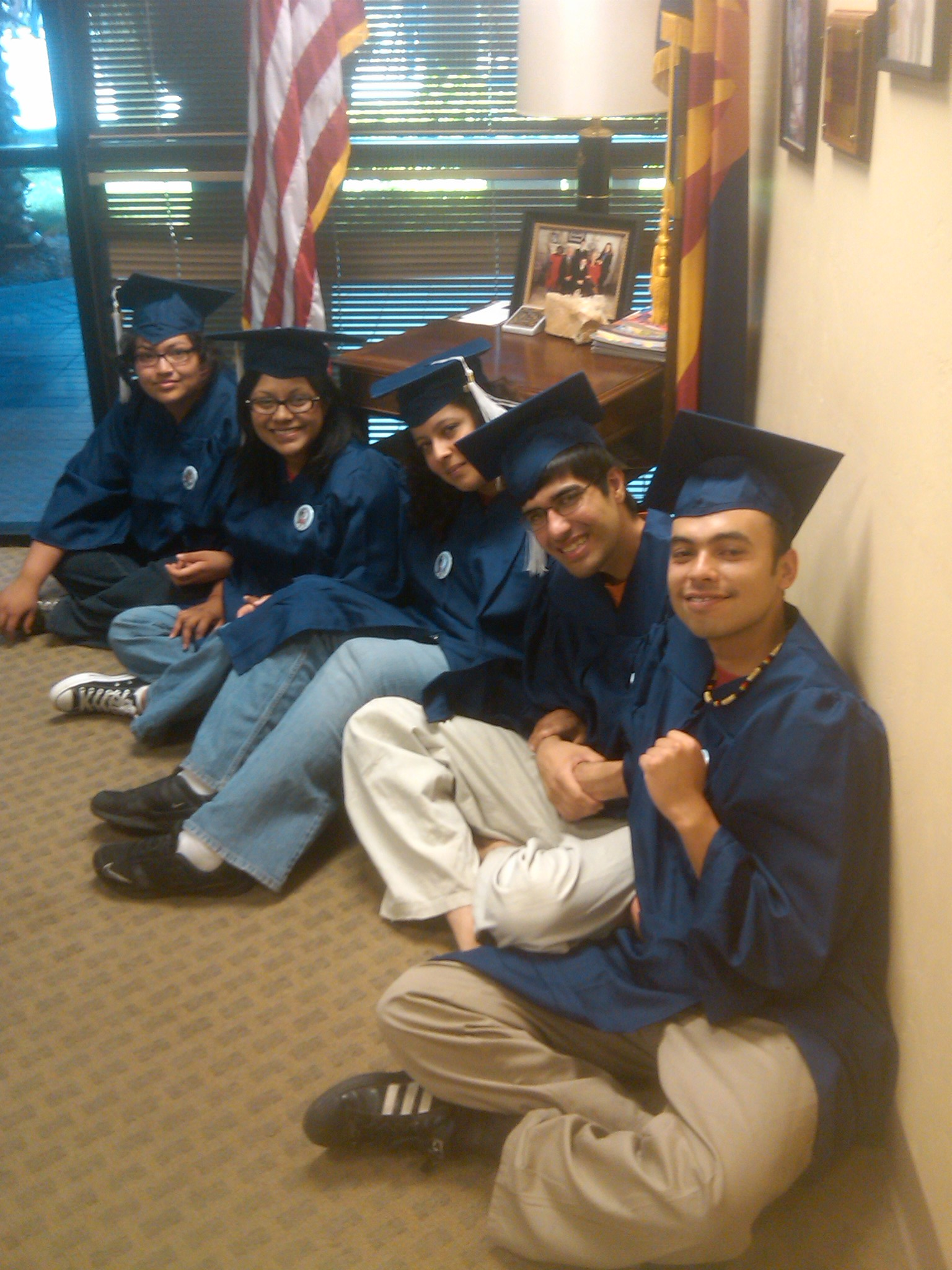
Students protesting on behalf of the DREAM Act in Senator John McCain's office, May 2010

In recent years, undocumented youth have gathered to lobby for legislative action. Organizations such as the Education Not Deportation (END) Our Pain Organization have been established to demand a moratorium for youth eligible for the DREAM Act. The act would grant conditional legal status to those brought here under the age of 16 if they attend college or join the military. Throughout 2009 and 2010, a number of sit-ins, hunger strikes, marches, and social media campaigns were conducted by many activist organizations. United We Dream organized 500 youth to participate in a National DREAM Act graduation in Washington combined with 15 more ceremonies nationwide. Between September and December 2010, pro-immigrant groups generated over 840,000 calls, faxes, and emails in favor of the DREAM Act, as well as 81,000 petitions delivered to targeted Senate offices. Youth activists often invoke a feeling of coming out, relating to the same action experienced by the LGBTQ community, to protest for protection of their rights despite threats of arrest, imprisonment, and deportation.

=== UndocuAlly training through undocumented student programs ===
Research shows that undocumented students are well served by programs that are based on UndocuAlly training, and oftentimes these programs are started through student-led initiatives. Undocumented student programs provide a foundation for community building and access to resources unique to undocumented students, such as low-cost legal services, mental health workshops, and career-building opportunities. Although such programs are new, they have had a significant impact on the retention and recruitment of undocumented students in higher education. UndocuAlly training is aimed at reducing the stigmas and prejudices towards immigrants. Workshops in which staff and faculty are informed on the struggles faced by undocumented students pursuing a higher education are offered, as well as training on different ways in which they can support said students. Workshops consist of student panels where undocumented students share their stories and struggles as they navigate higher education. These workshops also contain information on laws and legislation that directly and indirectly affect undocumented students across the United States. Through these trainings, staff and faculty can better serve their undocumented students by enabling them with career-building opportunities along with the establishment of support services/centers specifically for undocumented students.

== Education ==
=== Education access ===
Public schooling allows undocumented youth to assimilate into society. Youth from K-12 are protected by the Family Educational Rights and Privacy Act. This specific act prevents schools from releasing any information from students' records to immigration authorities. However, especially in areas with strict immigration enforcement policies, undocumented students continue to express emotions of fear and vulnerability. Graduation for these youth serves as a traumatic change in status and identity from student to "illegal alien" and "illegal worker." This "state of shock" causes depressed motivation and financial anxiety, causing youth to drop out of high school. 40 percent of undocumented adults ages 18–24 do not complete high school. Of those that complete high school, only 49 percent attend college. Many youths reported a feeling of falling through the cracks, instances where they were not able to get assistance from their educational institutions. The inability to receive federal and state student financial aid, as well as low family incomes, limits access for undocumented youth to attend post-secondary schooling. In 2006, Hispanic youth had the lowest educational attainment out of any ethnic or racial group. Parents can often not provide financial assistance, and immigrant youths carry financial burdens within their households.

Access to a college education can help improve the status of undocumented youth. Graduating college allows a person to improve labor market skills and makes them eligible for jobs where employers might potentially sponsor a temporary legal visa. A college education also increases marriageability, increasing the chances for youth to marry a legal citizen and obtain legal status through familial relationships. The majority of undocumented children are growing up with legal access to public education but face legal barriers to higher education. Abrego interviewed a girl named Alisa who came to the United States at the age of five from Guatemala; she encountered the difficulties of higher education. She was a student who excelled academically in high school and was admitted to the University of California. Alisa became disheartened due to her status and was unable to be given financial aid. Some researchers explain that undocumented children face an economic barrier when pursuing a higher education and find that because of this, they are unable to attend a university.

=== Undocumented students ===
Undocumented students may not know how to navigate the higher education system in their state, and this often leads to students not attending college. Undocumented students might assume that it is out of their financial means or not available to them due to their residency status. This leaves undocumented students in a vulnerable place because they are not gaining the educational experience and are not eligible for legal work. These difficulties are made harder by the lack of transparent information on financial aid and college applications, which leaves many students confused about their options. According to Human Rights Watch, supporters of the Development, Relief, and Education for Alien Minors Act (DREAM) acknowledged that undocumented students should not be punished for being in the United States illegally. They pointed out that more often than not, the child entered the United States at the behest of their parents. Undocumented students also experience challenges while attending college in the United States. A lot of undocumented students have trouble trusting people within their community. Due to their classification as aliens in the United States, undocumented immigrants often experience a sense of isolation. They feel like they don't belong in the country due to the way they are treated.

Undocumented immigrants, particularly students, are a difficult subgroup of the population to research; there is not much current statistical data available. As a result of their precarious legal and social situation, undocumented immigrants are hesitant to identify themselves, and the process of estimating statistics and drawing conclusions can be lengthy and cumbersome. While exact numbers are not known, there has been an increased emphasis on the challenges facing undocumented students nationwide.

Many undocumented students, despite being brought to the country at a young age, do not have DACA status. A significant portion arrived before age 10 or between the ages of 10 and 16. However, one obstacle to obtaining DACA status is the requirement that individuals had to arrive in the U.S. before 2007, which excludes some otherwise eligible students brought after this cutoff date. In 2021, immigrant students (both documented and undocumented) accounted for 31% of all college students, showing an increase from 20% in 2000.

=== Engagement of undocumented students ===
Even though there are several barriers undocumented students encounter in higher education, they continue to have high academic aspirations. A quantitative study described that Latino students see higher education as a road to better themselves. Their stories of aspirations are geared towards helping others and giving back to their community. Giving back helps to affirm their social citizenship, their existence, and validates their access to higher education.

Educational institutions play a role in promoting civic engagement among students. When schools provide volunteer opportunities and require community service to graduate, there is a higher chance that students will be civically engaged after graduation. In a qualitative study, Munoz found that undocumented female Mexican college students expressed frustration, helplessness, and fear because of their lack of legal status. However, they also disclosed being very involved in college extracurricular activities to feel a sense of belonging and validation. Munoz's qualitative study also indicates that 40% of undocumented students chose to be involved by participating in community service or mentoring activities to assist undocumented youth like themselves.

Due to their unclear legal status, some youth do generate feelings of being an outsider and dissociate from civic engagement. Through an online survey of open-ended questions, Perez, Espinoza, Ramos, Coronado, and Cortes reported that in elementary school, 38% of undocumented students were civically engaged. In middle school, rates increased to 41%. In high school, 73% participated in civic engagement, with 34% reporting spending more than 40 hours per year doing volunteer work. Also, 7% participated in social services, 3% were engaged in activism, 29% tutored other students, and 55% operated administrative work. In general, 86% of all respondents also participated in extracurricular activities during high school. In addition to college, 55% participated in some form of civic engagement. Even though undocumented Latino students had a high percentage in civic engagement, they also reported higher levels of feeling rejection because of their undocumented status. Ultimately, Perez, Espinoza, Ramos, Coronado, and Cortes identified that feelings of rejection were not correlated with lack of involvement and that most undocumented Latino youth going to college are engaging in U.S. civic life.

Undocumented youth change and acculturate to multiple circumstances that surround them by studying hard, following the codes of conduct, and acting as good citizens of the United States. Chang, Torrez, Ferguson, and Sagar conducted a qualitative study of 18 students, ages 18 and above, who identified as undocumented or were once undocumented. They found that students often had to be involved and engaged in the community to feel accepted. Undocumented students navigate as well as they can between social and cultural intrusions. Students often create a foundation to keep moving forward and not give up by taking advantage of their community's cultural wealth as a mechanism to keep hope.

Even though there are political restrictions for undocumented students to self-advocate, multiple students remained hopeful because they stood by the ideal of cultural citizenship even if it seemed unattainable. Chang, Torrez, Ferguson, and Sagar's study showed the participants' process of interpreting, integrating, and interjecting themselves as valuable objects in different cultural worlds to achieve the American dream. All this despite their social positions. Undocumented students keep high aspirations and participate in civil engagement, disregarding the barriers they may face due to their undocumented status in the United States.

=== Higher education ===
The Pew Hispanic Center estimates that 1.5 million undocumented students currently reside in the United States. Of these students, about 765,000 arrived in the United States before turning sixteen. It is also estimated that there were 360,000 undocumented high school graduates between the ages of eighteen and twenty-four in the United States in 2006. Some are able to continue their studies, but because of their unauthorized status, they frequently do so under a great deal of financial and mental stress. However, it is estimated that each year only 5 to 10 percent of undocumented high school graduates—about 65,000 nationwide—are eligible to attend college. In 2005, only about 50,000 undocumented students enrolled in U.S. colleges and universities. Of these college students, 18,000 were enrolled in California community colleges in the 2005–2006 school year as a result of financial accessibility. According to Roberto Gonzalez, Professor of Sociology at the University of Washington, "Given the opportunity to receive additional education and move into better-paying jobs, undocumented students would pay more in taxes and have more money to spend and invest in the U.S. economy."

==== Admission and enrollment ====
There is no federal law that prohibits the admission of undocumented immigrants to U.S. colleges and universities, public or private, nor does federal law require students to prove citizenship in order to enter U.S. institutions of higher education. However, every institution has its own policies on admitting undocumented students. For example, following a 2003 recommendation by the state attorney general, many 4-year state colleges in Virginia require applicants to submit proof of citizenship or legal residency and refuse admission to students without documentation. This policy is not, however, a state law. South Carolina and Alabama do not allow undocumented students to apply to public universities.

==== Tuition and financial aid ====
As of 2015, there were 11 million unauthorized immigrants in the United States, a small decline from the Pew Research Center's estimate of 11.3 million for 2009. In 2014, about 3.9 million students in kindergarten through 12th grade in U.S. public and private schools were children of unauthorized immigrants. While 3.2 million of this population were U.S.-born, approximately 725,000, or 1.3%, were unauthorized students themselves and potentially not receiving the financial resources they need to pursue higher education in the United States.

Programs such as the Deferred Action for Childhood Arrivals (DACA) create open space for undocumented students to qualify for post-secondary education benefits discussed in policies such as IIRIRA. Tuition is still quite expensive in spite of these initiatives, especially for students in states where in-state tuition rates are not available. The language in the Personal Responsibility and Work Opportunity Reconciliation Act (PRWORA) still bars DACA recipients from receiving public benefits since they are not "qualified aliens". The language in both PRWORA and IIRIRA are vague enough that they allow states to decide how to address tuition rates and state financial aid for their students. Although many states use these statutes as the reason to deny federal and state financial aid, many others argue that the definition of public benefits does not include offering in-state tuition to undocumented students. Furthermore, programs like Immigrant Rising, The Dream.US, and DCPS offer scholarships to aid undocumented students navigating financial aid and tuition costs.

There is no federal or state law that prohibits the admission of these immigrants to U.S. colleges and universities. Non-permanent residents and undocumented students are treated differently from one state to the next, resulting in no cohesive process and potential confusion for undocumented students. Research has found that immigrant students lack information about financing college and are thus less likely to apply for and take advantage of student loans. With access to the necessary information, support, and financial resources, however, higher education – and the opportunities that come with it – is certainly a viable option for undocumented students.

According to the uLead Network, as of 2017, there are 16 states that offer in-state tuition rates to undocumented students who meet specific criteria, with several of these offering state-funded financial aid as well:

State	Policy	In-state tuition eligibility requirements	Additional notes
California	AB540 AB130 & AB131 (see additional notes)	Must have attended a California high school for at least three academic years; Must have graduated from a California high school, attained a G.E.D., or received a passing mark on the California High School Proficiency Exam (CHSPE); Must enroll at an accredited institution of public higher education in California; Must file a "Non-Resident Tuition Exemption" Affidavit with the school and have filed or will file an application to legalize their immigration status as soon as possible	Per AB130 & 131, students who qualify for in-state tuition under AB540 are also eligible for state-funded financial aid.
Colorado	SB33	Must have attended a public or private high school in Colorado for at least three years immediately preceding graduation; Must have been admitted to or already attend a public college or university in Colorado within 12 months of graduating or completing a GED; Must sign an affidavit stating that they have applied for lawful presence or will apply as soon as they are able	
Connecticut	H6390	Must be a permanent resident in Connecticut; Must have attended at least two years of high school in the state of Connecticut; Graduated from a high school or received the equivalent of a high school diploma in Connecticut; Register as an entering student, or be enrolled at a public university in Connecticut; Must file an affidavit with the institution of higher education stating that the student has filed an application for legal immigration status or will file an application when eligible to do so	
Florida	HB851	Attended a Florida secondary school for 3 consecutive years immediately before graduating from a Florida high school; Applied for enrollment in an institution of higher education within 24 months after high school graduation; Submitted an official Florida high school transcript as evidence of attendance and graduation	
Illinois	HB60	Resided with his or her parent or guardian while attending a public or private high school in Illinois; Graduated from a public or private high school or received the equivalent of a high school diploma in Illinois; Attended school in Illinois for at least 3 years as of the date of graduating from high school or receiving the equivalent of a high school diploma; Provides the university with an affidavit stating that the individual will file an application to become a permanent resident of the United States at the earliest opportunity the individual is eligible to do so	
Kansas	HB2145	Attended an accredited Kansas high school for at least three years; Graduated from either an accredited Kansas high school or earned a general educational development (GED) certificate issued within Kansas; Has filed an affidavit stating he/she will apply for legal residency when eligible	
Maryland	S167 / H470	Students must first attend a community college in order to be eligible for in-state tuition at a four-year institution. Eligibility requirements for receiving in-state tuition at a community college: Must have attended a secondary school in Maryland for at least three years; Must have graduated from a high school in Maryland or received the equivalent of a high school diploma in Maryland; Must provide documentation that the individual or the individual's parent or legal guardian has filed a Maryland income tax return annually for the three years while the individual attended a high school in the state, during any period between high school graduation and registration at a community college, and during the period of attendance at the community college; Must register at a community college within four years of high school graduation; To then be eligible to receive in-state tuition at a four-year college, the student: Must have met the requirements for an exemption from paying the out-of-state tuition rate at a community college; Must have attained an associate degree or achieved 60 credits at a community college in Maryland; Must provide the institution a copy of the affidavit stating that the individual will file an application to become a permanent resident within 30 days after becoming eligible to do so; Must provide documentation that the individual or the individual's parent or legal guardian has filed a Maryland income tax return annually while the individual attended a community college, during any period between graduation from or achieving 60 credits at a community college and registration at a public four-year institution, and during the period of attendance at an institution; Must register at a public four-year institution within four years of graduating from or achieving 60 credits at a community college	
Minnesota	SF1236	Attended a Minnesota high school for at least 3 years; Graduated from a Minnesota high school or earned a GED in Minnesota; Registered with the U.S. Selective Service (applies only to males 18 to 25 years old); Provide documentation to show they have applied for lawful immigration status, but only if a federal process exists for a student to do so (does not include applying for Deferred Action for Childhood Arrivals). There is currently not a federal process in place, so this documentation is not currently required.	Students who qualify for in-state tuition under SF1236 are also eligible for state-funded financial aid.
Nebraska	LB239	Reside in Nebraska for at least three years prior to high school graduation/obtaining a GED; Graduate from a Nebraska public or private high school or obtain a GED; Live with a parent or guardian while attending high school; Provide an affidavit stating their intention to become a permanent resident at their earliest opportunity. If the parent ceases to reside in Nebraska, the student can retain resident status if the student has a bona fide intention to reside in Nebraska	
New Jersey	SB2479	Attend high school in New Jersey for three or more years; Graduate from a high school in New Jersey or receive the equivalent of a high school diploma; File an affidavit with the institution of higher education stating that the student has filed an application to legalize his or her immigration status or will file an application as soon as eligible to do so; Meets the Department of Homeland Security's eligibility criteria and has applied for or received Deferred Action for Childhood Arrivals (DACA) status	
New Mexico	SB582 SB82 (see additional notes)	Attended New Mexico middle or high school for at least one year; Graduated from a high school or received their GED in the state of New Mexico	Per SB82, students who qualify for in-state tuition under SB582 are also eligible for state-funded financial aid.
New York	SB7784	Attend at least two years of high school in New York; Graduate from a New York high school or receive a GED; Apply for attendance at an institution within 5 years of receiving a diploma; Show proof of residence; File an affidavit declaring that you will file for legal status when able	
Oregon	HB2787	Demonstrate three years of attendance at an Oregon primary and secondary school prior to receiving a high school diploma or equivalent; Enroll in a public university in Oregon within three years of earning a high school diploma or equivalent in Oregon; Shows intention to become a citizen or lawful permanent resident in the United States	Students who qualify for in-state tuition under HB2787 are also eligible for state-funded financial aid.
Texas	SB1528	Graduate from a public or private high school, or receive a GED, in Texas; Reside in Texas for at least the 3 years leading up to high school graduation or receiving a GED; Reside in Texas for the 12 consecutive months right before the semester the student is enrolling in college; Provide the institution an affidavit stating that they will file an application to become a U.S. permanent resident as soon as they are eligible to do so	Students who qualify for in-state tuition under SB1528 are also eligible for state-funded financial aid.
Utah	HB144	Must have attended high school in Utah for three or more years; Must have graduated from a high school in Utah or received the equivalent of a high school diploma in Utah; Must file an affidavit with the institution of higher education stating that the student has filed an application to legalize his immigration status or will file an application as soon as possible	
Washington	HB1079	Earned a diploma or equivalent (GED) from a Washington high school; Resided in Washington for at least three consecutive years as of the date the person received a diploma or GED; Continually lived in Washington since receiving a diploma or GED; Filed an affidavit verifying that he or she qualifies to pay resident tuition and will seek legal permanent residency when legally permitted to do so	Per SB6523, students who qualify for in-state tuition under HB1079 are also eligible for state-funded financial aid.

In addition to these 16 states, Hawaii, Michigan, Oklahoma, and Rhode Island allow this through the school system, their Board of Regents. Virginia only allows in-state tuition for DACA students.

While some states opt to pass their own legislation allowing in-state tuition for undocumented students, it does not fully bridge the gap for financial aid. Some states, like Georgia, have worked against education for undocumented students by forbidding enrollment in some colleges.

Outside the aforementioned states offering state financial aid, undocumented students are not eligible for federal financial aid, which makes the cost of tuition and fees an even greater obstacle to higher education. Undocumented students must rely primarily on private scholarships as a source of funding for their post-secondary education. There are a few private scholarships that do not require the student to be a U.S. citizen or resident or have a social security number in order to apply. The Mexican American Legal Defense and Education Fund (MALDEF) maintains the most comprehensive listing of such scholarships.

Private colleges and universities set their own financial aid policies. Some offer financial aid in the form of grants and scholarships to undocumented students.

==== Additional barriers ====
Understanding how to navigate the higher education labyrinth is a learned social practice, a skill acquired through social networks, parental understanding, and access to the information. The opportunities to learn about college access are inequitably taught to undocumented students. Most undocumented students come from working-class or working-poor families. This leads to their families living in communities where they become vulnerable to crimes, poor housing conditions, high unemployment, and under performing schools. Many of the schools they attend face high teacher turnover, overcrowding, and inadequate teacher preparation. Many of the students are placed into language development courses, which often do not provide the rigorous coursework needed for college preparation. These students also may struggle with their schoolwork due to the discontinuity in their education. Some students arrive in the United States after attending schools in their country of birth. Adjusting to the education system in the United States can be a challenge for students. Some may be behind because their previous schools were not teaching the same curriculum, or if their schools were ahead of the curriculum, students might lose interest in their new schools. Undocumented students can also struggle with their need to contribute money to their household. Some students work as migrant farmers alongside their parents; this economic need can set them back in their education and in their path to understanding the steps to higher education. All of these things can inhibit undocumented students from successfully preparing for higher education.

Another barrier undocumented students face in their access to higher education is the lack of resources and adequate support from school professionals. Many school professionals—teachers, counselors, other personnel—are not always aware of their state's policies regarding admission, tuition, and financial aid for undocumented students. Some school professionals are even unaware which students on their campus are undocumented. School professionals, often, do not receive training about policies that affect students, and some have acknowledged that they only learned because of interactions with students or what they have learned through the media. Undocumented students, who have been surveyed regarding their educational experience, claimed to feel as if they "lucked out", having someone to mentor them in college access. Unfortunately, not all students feel this way. Although some students do acknowledge having an influential teacher or college counselor, many students feel unsupported or feel as if they were given incorrect information.

A way that places of higher education can overcome these barriers for undocumented students is through the establishment of an Undocumented Student Program or having UndocuAlly training. UndocuAlly trainings are aimed at reducing the stigmas and prejudices towards immigrants. They offer workshops in which staff and faculty are informed on the struggles faced by undocumented students pursuing a higher education and different ways in which they can support said students. Workshops consist of student panels where undocumented students share their stories and struggles as they navigate higher education. Aside from the student panels, these workshops also contain information on laws and legislation that directly and indirectly affect undocumented students across the United States. Through these trainings, staff and faculty can better serve their undocumented students by enabling them with career-building opportunities along with the establishment of support services/centers specifically for undocumented students.

Having college access information available to support undocumented students is not only a tool that undocumented students can use for themselves; it is information that they can then pass down to others. Many parents of undocumented students do not have the knowledge to help their child pursue higher education. These families have strong family networks, and with accurate information, students will then be able to share it with the younger children in their networks. If community groups and school professionals reach out to undocumented students in ways that work within their culture, these students can have an increased chance of attending higher education.

== Employment and transitions into adulthood ==
Youth brought to the United States as adolescents are at greater risk for adjustment difficulties. Many undergo acculturated distress: poor mental health, depression, anxiety, a feeling of alienation, and identity confusion. Markers in the transition into adulthood, such as finding work, applying for college, and obtaining a driver's license, all require legal status to obtain. Youth undergo three transition periods as they enter into adulthood: discovery, learning to be undocumented, and coping. The first, discovery (ages 16–18), is the time when youth first discover that they are undocumented. Within this period, key transitional markers such as obtaining a driver's license and applying for college are experienced. These markers often become the first time many youth learn that they are undocumented. The second period, learning to be undocumented (ages 18–24), is a series of life alterations in which youth learn to live as an undocumented immigrant. This includes finding work as an undocumented immigrant and postponing secondary education. The third, coping (ages 25–29), is adjusting to lower expectations and realizing the true limits of their rights. This leads many youth to follow into the same job pool as their undocumented parents.

This gap still exists between higher education and financial aid for undocumented students. Since undocumented students are not eligible for most forms of financial aid, merit scholarships are not feasible, as they most often restrict their eligibility to U.S. citizens or permanent residents. Undocumented students are not eligible for federal aid; thus, benefits that come from FAFSA or Pell Grants do not apply to these students. Most state-based aid is also out of reach for undocumented students, so grants, work study, and loans are not options. States opt to pass their own legislation allowing in-state tuition for undocumented students; while this is an important step for undocumented students, it does not fully bridge the gap for financial aid. Some states, like Georgia, have worked against education for undocumented students by forbidding enrollment in some colleges. Statistics show $11.64 billion in taxes each year comes from undocumented immigrants (Tax Contributions). Findings also show that there would be $805 million in tax revenue with the Obama Administration's executive action that includes the implementation of DACA and its expansion. These findings also show that a full immigration reform would increase tax revenue by $2.1 billion. Giving these groups the availability for higher education aid would only increase these benefits through their consumption and investment in the economy.

== See also ==
- Undocumented immigrant population of the United States
