= Immigrant health care in the United States =

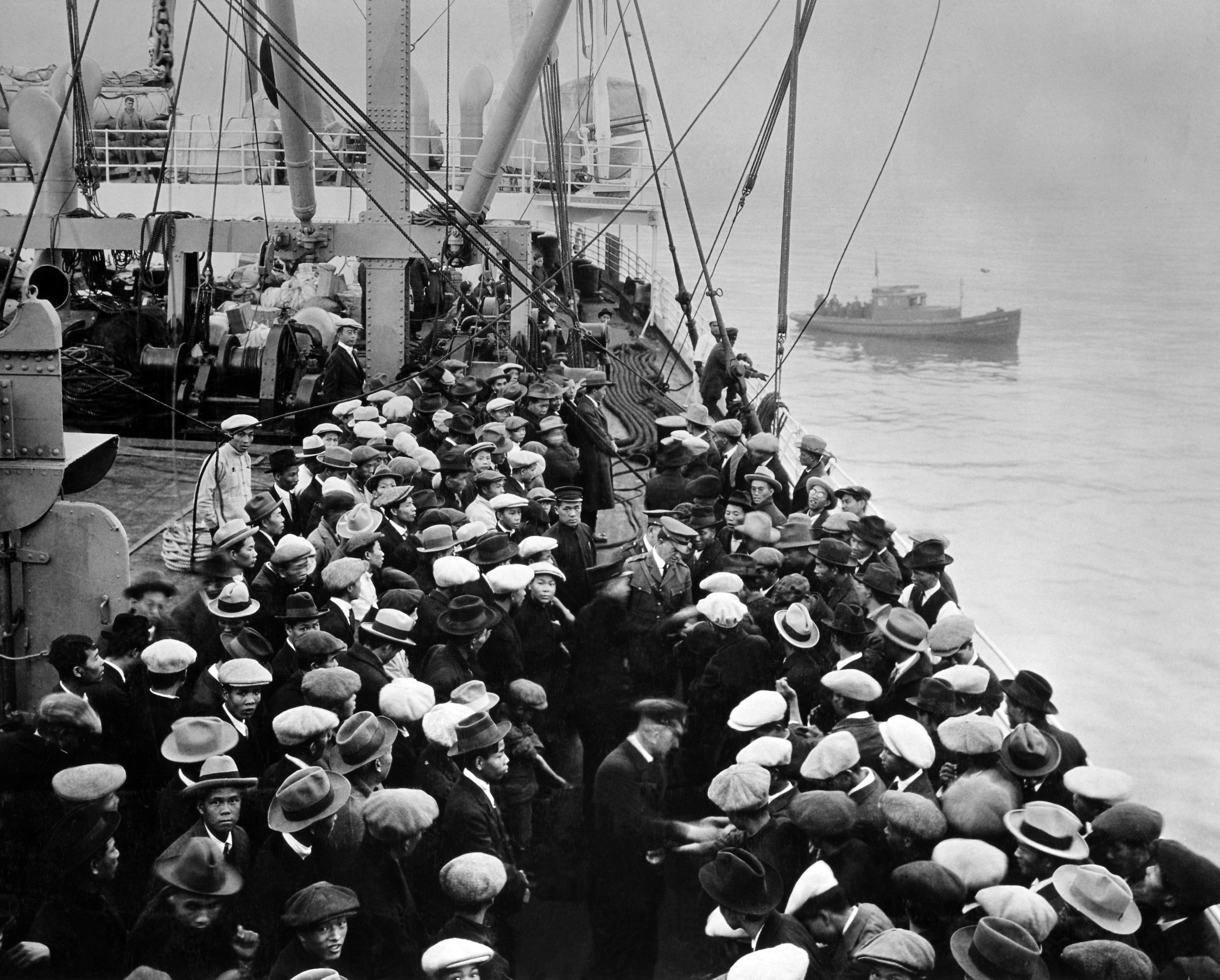
Immigrants at Ellis Island undergoing mandatory health inspections, 19th century

Immigrant health care in the United States refers to the collective systems in the United States that deliver health care services to immigrants. The term "immigrant" is often used to encompass non-citizens of varying status; this includes permanent legal residents, refugees, and undocumented residents.

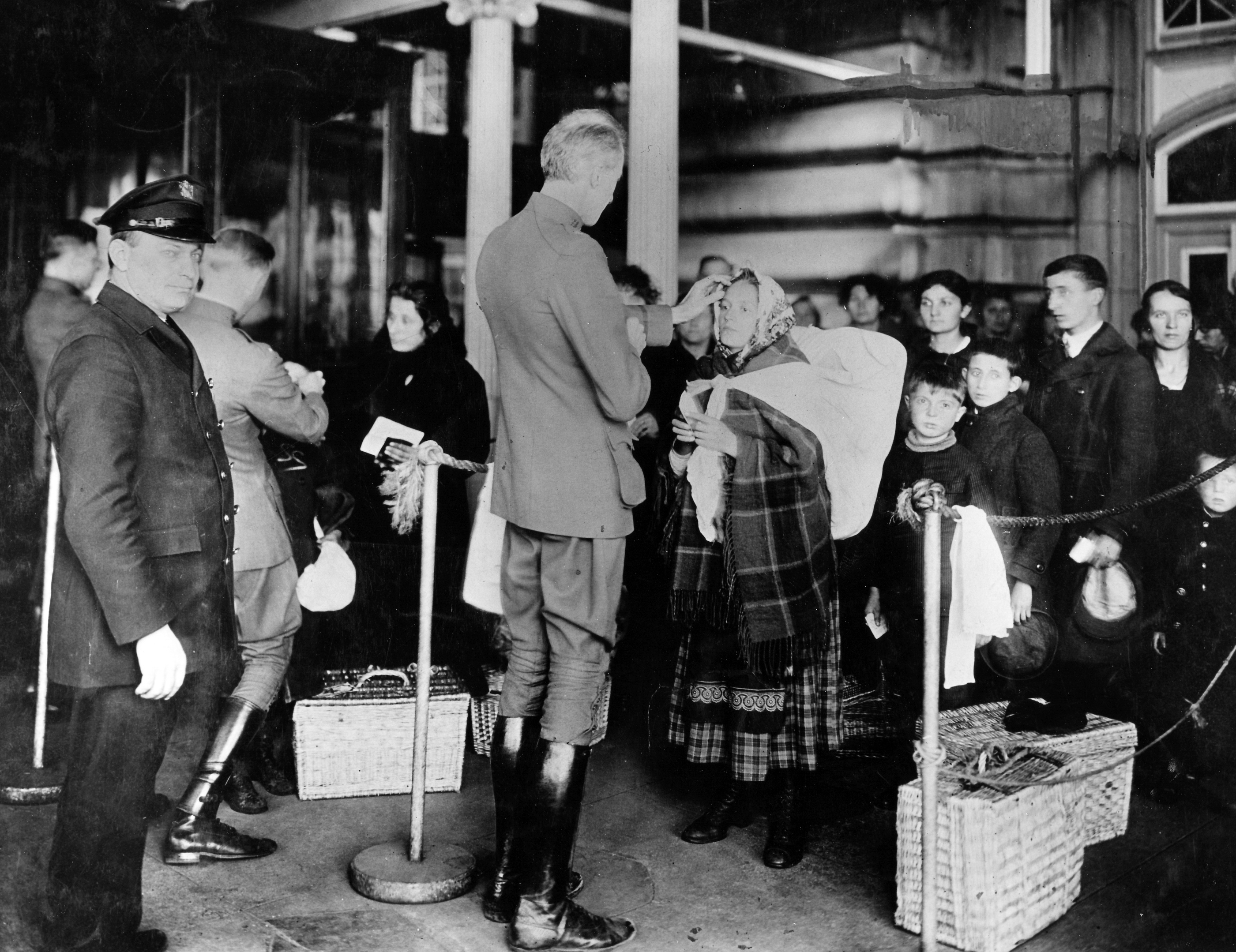
Doctors inspecting immigrants for trachoma at Ellis Island, 1910

Immigrant health care is considered distinct from citizen health care, due to intersecting socioeconomic factors and health policies associated with immigration status. Disparities in health care usage, coverage, and quality are also observed, not only between immigrants and citizens but also among immigrant groups as well. Existing studies have revealed strong correlation of these disparities with a combination of structural and social factors, including lack of insurance, high costs of care, restrictions associated with undocumented status, perceptions of discrimination, and language barriers. Intersections of health and immigration policies also create distinctive outcomes for immigrants, such as medical deportations and delivery of medical services in immigration detention centers.

Policy efforts at reforming the health care system in regards to treatment of immigrants have varied in the past decade. The subject of health care benefits for immigrants has become increasingly popular in political discourse.

== Overview ==
According to the United States Department of Homeland Security, the influx of immigrants into the States has been 1.7 million in 2014, indicating a constant flow of immigrants. Furthermore, the United States Census Bureau projects that this number will continue to increase in the next decade. In addition to its impact on the country's demographics and labor market, this rise in the immigrant population has had a disparate impact on the United States' health care system and its surrounding dialogue.

=== Accessibility ===
Accessibility of health care services is contingent on factors such as insurance coverage, socioeconomic status, language proficiency, and familiarity with the United States health care system. Overall, analyses indicate that after factors such as health status, income, and race and ethnicity are controlled for, citizenship status plays a significant role in determining one's medical care access. Since the enactment of the Personal Responsibility and Work Opportunity Act (PRWORA), colloquially known as "welfare reform," in 1996, the gap in health coverage between immigrants and citizens has grown considerably. Immigrants and their children are less likely to be insured, and the lack of insurance consequently reduces their ability to receive care. Naturalized citizens, on the other hand, generally receive the same level of health care access as U.S.-born citizens, implying that health care usage becomes more available with acculturation.

==== Healthcare providers ====
The health care system in the United States is made up of both public and private insurers, with the private sphere generally dominating in providing coverage. Despite this, the federal government remains important given its role in determining public health benefits—for instance, Medicaid, the United States health program for families and individuals of low income.

Following the enactment of PRWORA, colloquially known as welfare reform, in 1996, gaps in health care coverage between immigrants and citizens increased significantly. PRWORA created stricter requirements for immigrants' eligibility for Medicaid and similar federal insurance programs. This legislative move largely shifted responsibility for immigrant health care from the federal government to the state and local levels; as such, its impact varies across states. Generally, the provisions of PRWORA prevent immigrants from accessing federal benefits like the State Children's Health Insurance Program (SCHIP) until after they have held lawful permanent residency for five years (except in cases of emergency). However, several states have responded by fully funding Medicaid-covered services, thus expanding eligibility; among these are Illinois, New York, the District of Columbia, and some counties in California. These services differ accordingly, with some providing the same coverage as Medicaid or SCHIP, while others limit coverage to specific categories of immigrants. Conversely, other states like Arizona, Colorado, Georgia, and Virginia, have implemented laws that further restrict noncitizens' access to health care. Legislation of similar nature include the Deficit Reduction Act of 2005, which requires proof of identity and U.S. citizenship from all those applying for/renewing Medicaid coverage.

In contrast to PRWORA, the Emergency Medical Treatment and Active Labor Act (EMTALA) of 1986 mandates that anyone who enters a hospital emergency department be screened and medically stabilized, without any requirements of insurance, proof of citizenship, or residency. The right to emergency screening and stabilization under EMTALA is not directly supported by federal funding; uninsured patients receive a bill for their care. Those who are unable to pay can be covered under Emergency Medicaid programs in some states, or the care is uncompensated. Immigrants are more likely to rely on emergency departments due to lack of access to preventative care.

In some areas like Washington D.C., uninsured immigrants receive outpatient care from public clinics and community health centers. However, the services offered by this type of health care tends to be uneven; for example, specialty services like Pap smears may be offered but not blood pressure tests or follow-up treatments. Several municipalities in the United States also offer health care coverage for undocumented immigrants, including Los Angeles County's My Health LA program.

Immigrant usage of complementary and alternative medicine (CAM) is also comparatively lower than usage by U.S.-born citizens. A study by Bilikisu Elewonibi and Rhonda BeLue found that overall CAM usage is more likely with health insurance coverage, the latter of which tends to be less common among immigrants.

==== Patient Protection and Affordable Care Act ====
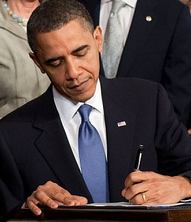
President Barack Obama signing the Affordable Care Act, 2010

On March 23, 2010, the Patient Protection and Affordable Care Act (PPACA) was signed into law by President Barack Obama. This legislation, joined with the Health Care and Education Reconciliation Act of 2010, seeks to expand coverage and improve access to the health care system while simultaneously managing its costs. Among PPACA's provisions are: the requirement that all U.S. citizens and legal residents possess health insurance; the creation of refundable tax credits for households between 100% and 400% of the federal poverty line; the expansion of Medicaid eligibility; the provision of free preventative services; the extension of dependent coverage to age 26; new funding to support community health centers; and more.

PPACA's creation of subsidies to make insurance more affordable notably benefits legal residents. In contrast, undocumented immigrants are denied these subsidies and further prohibited from participating in federal or state health insurance exchanges, though their lawfully present children will be eligible.

Views on the act's contributions to the immigrant population vary. Some argue that the reform has immense benefits by addressing coverage gaps and extending more benefits to naturalized citizens. Others argue that substantial disparities still exist, with an estimated 3.7 million adults remaining uninsured due to their undocumented status. Furthermore, because the act does not address the five-year waiting period placed by PRWORA, more recent low-income legal immigrants may not seek insurance.

=== Quality of care ===
Studies on immigrant health care more commonly focus on accessibility, compared to quality. Collected data indicates lower levels of heart disease, arthritis, depression, hypertension, asthma, and cancer among immigrants than U.S.-born citizens. Speculation behind this phenomenon looks towards the fact that the immigrant population is generally younger than the native-born population as a whole; others believe that these medical conditions simply have not yet been detected given immigrants' lower rates of health coverage.

While aggregate health data may suggest immigrants experience lower rates of certain conditions, this likely reflects under-diagnosis rather than true health advantages. Research found that unawareness of cardiovascular disease risk factors tends to be higher among foreign-born participants than among US-born participants, and that after adjusting for demographic factors and access to health care, foreign-born participants are more likely to be unaware of their hypertension and overweight. With this lack of awareness immigrants may be less likely to seek treatment and modify their behavior to prevent negative cardiovascular outcomes. This diagnostic gap is worsened by structural barriers to care as without the right to federally funded health insurance, undocumented immigrants face significant difficulties accessing primary care or specialty services, making the emergency department the only point of access in the U.S. healthcare system obligated to provide them care, a setting not designed to manage chronic conditions.

A literature review by Kathryn Derose, Jose Escarce, and Nicole Lurie indicates that immigrant health outcomes appear to worsen as levels of acculturation increase. This may be attributable to a combination of personal behavioral changes and systemic factors, the latter of which includes disparate deliveries of medical care and public health services such as immunizations. Uninsured immigrants typically seek outpatient care from public clinics or community health centers. Such services tend to perform more poorly in rural areas.

Research also demonstrates that immigration status is strongly correlated with the perception of being targets of discrimination by health care providers. Foreign-born Asians and Latinos reported higher frequencies of discriminatory experiences compared to their US-born counterparts. Undocumented Latino immigrants also reported more negative experiences overall. Undocumented patients are less likely receive regular, scheduling for life-saving treatments such as dialysis, despite the higher efficacy of scheduled treatments compared to emergency-only. Overall, immigrants report more displeasure with their health care experiences than US-born patients do.

=== Costs of health care ===
Compared to accessibility and quality, there is significantly less research on the costs of immigrant health care in the United States. In general, immigrants have less interaction with the health care system, though incidences in which they do tend more likely to be through emergency departments. On average, immigrants report lower usages of healthcare services. As such, their per capita spending on health care is lower than that of the US-born population. In their research, Dana Goldman, James Smith, and Neeraj Sood find that health care costs are largely influenced by health insurance coverage. In the year 2000, immigrants' healthcare costs comprised 8.5% of total expenditures on medical care in the United States, while undocumented immigrants' costs were estimated to be approximately 1.5%. Lower costs and degrees of medical care usage may be attributable to existing barriers to care, better health outcomes as described by the "healthy immigrant effect," and reluctance to report health problems.

== Demographics ==
=== Children ===
Studies indicate that, even if born in the United States, children of non-citizens tend to have poorer health than children of citizens. Not only are they more likely to be uninsured, but they also have less access to both medical and dental care. Children of immigrants are also less likely to have received proper immunizations than their U.S.-born peers.

A 2001 study by Sylvia Guendelman indicates that foreign-born children are less likely than American-born children to have consistent access to a reliable source of health care. Additional findings show that foreign-born children make less ambulatory and emergency visits to hospitals; however, they have considerably higher costs on average when they do, suggesting that immigrant children are sicker or more severely affected during emergencies. This inference is drawn from their lower rates of outpatient and office-based visits.

Another study done in Los Angeles County in 2000 found that how children with undocumented parents encountered greater obstacles when trying to access and utilize health care resources.

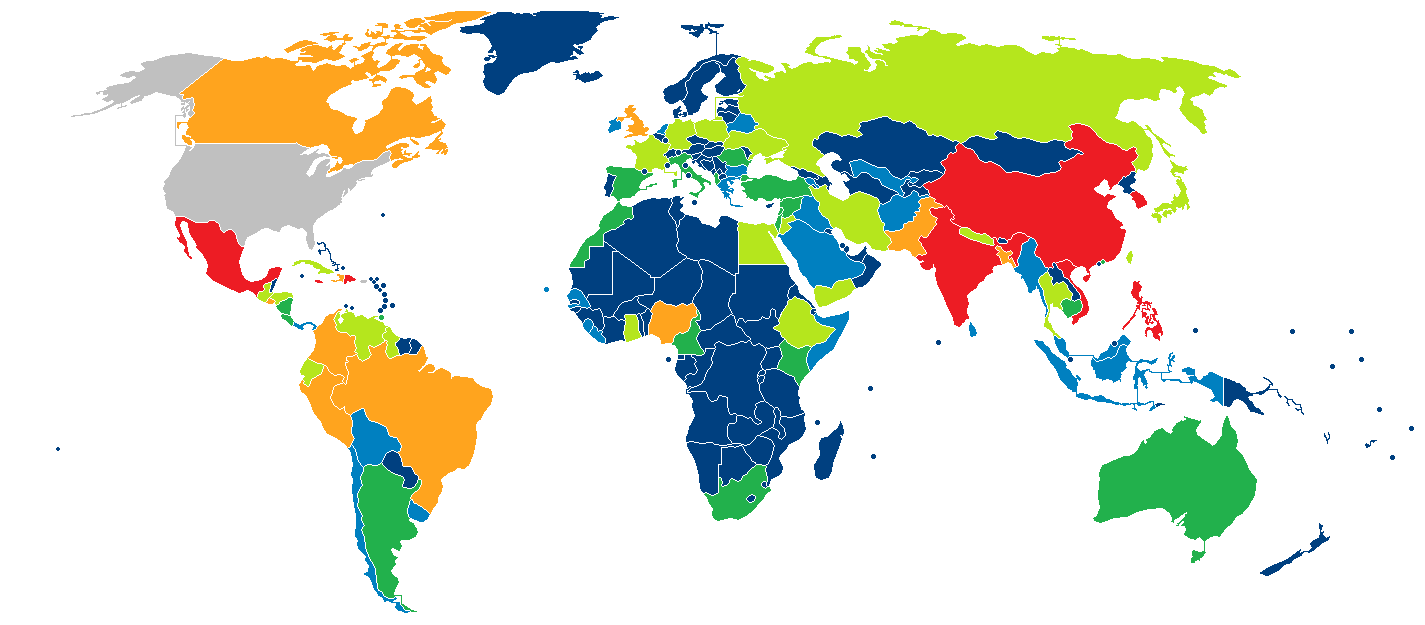
Distribution of new immigrants to the United States from 2013 to 2017, by country of origin

=== Hispanics and Latinos ===
Though no precise data on the undocumented immigrant population is available, estimates in 2009 suggest that 70% are from either Mexico or Central America.

A study conducted by Pew Hispanic Center in 2007 indicated that factors that determined quality of care included years of residency in the United States, income level, education status, health insurance coverage, and health literacy. Among many immigrant groups, Latino communities tend to undergo challenges in healthcare settings and receive lower quality of care than other ethnic groups.

Data indicates that, in 2002, Latinos had an uninsured rate of 33% compared to the national average of 15%. Compared to citizens with similar wages, hours, or occupations, Hispanic non-citizens were half to two-thirds less likely to be offered health coverage in the workplace. Further studies show that regardless of immigration status, non-white Hispanics have less access to health care services than white citizens overall.

Findings indicate that a large body of Hispanic and Latino Americans have similar or better outcomes than the average population—a phenomenon that has been labeled the Hispanic paradox. Further research indicates that this paradox exists only on some health measures; for example, Hispanic immigrants are healthier in terms of blood pressure and heart disease than non-immigrant non-Hispanic whites, but are more likely to be overweight or obese and have diabetes.

=== Asians ===
Health insurance coverage rates vary among Asian immigrant subgroups; some Asian subgroups match those European immigrants but others, like Vietnamese and Korean immigrants, had uninsured rates of over 30%.

Additional research indicates that, compared to children of other ethnic groups, Asian children receive the poorest quality of primary care. Despite the tendency for less health care access than non-Hispanic white citizens, data reviews find that Asian ethnicities and immigrant status are correlated with better health and higher school attendance among children. However, this observation of "better health" may potentially be attributed to less diagnoses as a result of less health care utilization. Others also suggest that the higher rates of school attendance among Asian children may result from cultural values that prioritize education.

Asian immigrants may practice alternative medicine after migration. For example, Vietnamese, Chinese, and Indonesian immigrants use healing techniques such as gua sha, also known as coin rubbing, and fire cupping.

Culture assimilation and English literacy have been observed to be major determinants in frequency of health care usage. A study of Asian immigrants by Huabin Luo and Bei Wu found that longer residencies in the United States and English proficiency were correlated with more regular visits to dental clinics. Another cross-sectional study among Chinese immigrants has shown that English proficiency as well as print health literacy is crucial in determining immigrants' health status. In addition to language barriers, some Asian subgroups emphasize a higher level of trust between health care practitioners and patients, and as a result, may feel alienated using the more formalized American health care system.

=== Africans ===
A study by Jacqueline Lucas, Daheia Barr-Anderson, and Raynard Kington indicates that black male immigrants demonstrate better health outcomes than US-born black men. This finding comports with the "healthy immigrant effect," which describes the idea that those who immigrate to 'developed countries' tend to enjoy better health than the native-born populations. Multiple studies also demonstrate that black immigrants are less likely to have insurance than US-born black and white counterparts. Insurance rates of black male immigrants do not significantly vary with income, employment status, or health status. Foreign-born black men also use physician and hospital services less frequently than US-born black and white men.

Project MUSE's report on African refugee and immigrant health needs reveals that African immigrants struggle with accessing health care services due to lack of information concerning providers, costs, and unfamiliarity with the U.S. health care system. Communications with health care providers are also complicated by language barriers, differing degrees of English literacy, and immigration status. Mental health services tend to be less frequently utilized due to stigma concerning mental health disorders and social pressures to characterize mental and emotional struggles as offshoots of stress.

Homer Venters and Francesca Gany found that cultural perceptions of disease models and illness can impede effective communications between African immigrants and health care providers. Specifically, hypertension, diabetes, coronary artery disease, and other chronic conditions are considered to be less understood due to their relative greater prevalence in nations such as the United States.

=== Women ===
Studies have found that immigrant men demonstrate greater health outcomes than immigrant women; gendered health disparities are observed to be greater among immigrant populations than US citizens. Whether an immigrant woman is legally documented or not, there are many constituents in laws that prevent immigrant women from qualifying for health insurance that can intercept them from getting standard medical services and causing the negative outcomes.

Immigrant women who become ill in the United States face multiple levels of marginalization from their immigration status, health status, and gender status. In a survey by Carol Pavlish, Sahra Noor, and Joan Brandt, Somali women in Minnesota reported encountering obstacles with unfamiliar healthcare systems, inefficiencies of diagnosis and treatment processes, and ineffective communication with medical professionals. Religious beliefs and practices of immigrant women may also play a role on the medical decisions of immigrant women and their families which can affect their health. There are instances when health care professionals might think that a mother or a woman is well-rounded on personal health, which may lead to the lack of giving supplemental or further information to the patient when there is a possibility that many immigrant women are not educated enough on medicine. Scientific or medical myths may also influence the opinions of immigrant women, mothers in particular, that may be the cause of their decisions regarding health that can lead to mistreatment or undiagnosed illnesses. Some immigrant women may find themselves struggling to balance their health with their culture and traditions that may dictate what they want to decide for their health, while also learning American health culture.

Compared to women born in the United States, immigrant women do not have the same access to health care services and insurances. Without these, immigrant women are at a higher risk for health complications and illnesses, particularly in the area of sexual and reproductive health. Whether immigrant women have medical insurance or not, immigrant women are reluctant to seek help because some might fear that it may negatively affect their immigration status. Immigrant women are less likely to get mammograms, Pap tests, and other sexual and reproductive health services. About one in five immigrant women who have medical insurance do not use it. Statistical data from Kaiser Family Foundation and National Immigration Law Center in 2018 showed that 34 states permit lawfully residing immigrant children without 5-year wait (Medicaid or Children's Health Insurance Program/CHIP), 25 states permit lawfully residing pregnant women without 5-year wait (Medicaid or CHIP), and 16 states permit pregnant women regardless of status (CHIP). Current research also indicates that immigration status in the United States affects all aspects of sexual and reproductive health of a woman. The reported level of postpartum depression is twice as high for Arabic US immigrant women than comparators in their birth country. Birth countries might not recognize postpartum depression or mental health as an important area of health and wellbeing compared to the United States, so it may be unreported in other countries.

Immigrant women who endure intimate partner violence (IPV) may encounter difficulties in obtaining medical help. In a focus group by Heidi Bauer and her colleagues, abused Asian and Latina immigrant women expressed hesitance to seek health care. due to linguistic obstructions, lack of kinship and social networks, and fear of jeopardizing their relationship or their children's safety. Immigrants coming from English-speaking countries may face less issues in the health care system because the language barrier is not as wide compared to countries whose primary language is not English.

Many studies on immigrant women in the United States conclude that advanced research and studies are needed to be done to obtain more statistical data on immigrant women's health. The missing substantial evidence can be linked to immigrant women's reluctance to finding health care and the insufficient and unavailable services that are difficult to acquire. Without evidence and statistical data, it is difficult to track and label the reasons for the higher health complications of immigrant women compared to women born in the United States.

== Barriers to care ==
=== Structural barriers ===
==== Lack of health insurance ====
Having health insurance is one of the first steps for an older immigrant to access health services in the new country. Lack of health insurance has been cited as a major reason behind immigrants' low usage of the United States health care services. The Survey of Income and Program Participation (SIPP) indicated that in 2002, 13.4% of native-born citizens were not insured compared to 43.8% of foreign-born adults. In order to be eligible for Medicare Parts A and B, individuals must be citizens of the United States or an LPR, also known as "green card" holders, in the United States with 5 years of continuous residence in the country.

Reasons for lack of insurance vary, but the findings of a 2005 study suggest that personal characteristics as well as the types of jobs immigrants have factor largely into the lack of coverage. There is a high concentration of immigrants in low-paying jobs and other jobs that do not offer health insurance. Personal characteristics that stem from structural obstacles include education; both immigrants and native-born citizens who have lower levels of education tend to be uninsured. High uninsured rates are also often correlated with greater difficulties in accessing and retaining insurance. Because of the eligibility criteria for Medicare, late-life immigrants are much less likely to have Medicare, more likely to have Medicaid, and less likely to have a regular source of care compared to their native-born and early-life immigrant counterparts.

Undocumented immigrants and those with Deferred Action for Childhood Arrivals (DACA) deferments are not eligible for many of the coverage options offered through the Patient Protection and Affordable Care Act. Coverage for U.S. born individuals is 12 percent, while immigrants with less than five years' residency in the United States have an uninsured rate of nearly 50 percent.

==== Citizenship status ====
Many immigrants report that distrust prevents them from actively seeking out health services. Although the Immigration and Naturalization Service has stated that receiving Medicaid or SCHIP benefits (with the exception of long-term care) does not jeopardize residency status, many lawful permanent residents are unaware and perceive otherwise. The New York Times reported that fear of deportation or detention causes immigrants, especially those who are undocumented, to refrain from seeking medical care. This includes screenings, picking up prescriptions, and participation in federal nutrition programs. A study by Russell Toomey and his colleagues similarly confirmed that Mexican-born teenagers and mothers decreased their usage of preventive health care and public assistance programs after the implementation of SB 1070 in Arizona. Prolonged fear of deportation has also been observed to exacerbate mental health conditions such as stress, depression, and anxiety.

The chilling effect of immigration enforcement radiates outward through entire households and communities regardless of legal status. Research published in BMC Public Health found that an increase in the risk of deportation is associated with a decrease in Medicaid use even among mixed-status families, in which some members are U.S. citizens while others are undocumented. A 2025 survey of 691 healthcare workers across 30 states conducted by Physicians for Human Rights found that 84 percent reported significant or moderate decreases in patient visits since January 2025 executive orders on immigration, and that health care providers observed children presenting at later disease stages with preventable complications and delayed diagnoses, with parents making impossible choices, seeking care only when legally mandated or only when illness severity became life-threatening, while routine immunizations, developmental screenings, and preventive interventions were being sacrificed. A 2025 Kaiser Family Foundation and New York Times survey further documented that challenges now affect people who are lawfully present and even naturalized citizens, contributing to declines in insurance participation, reduced clinic visits, and worsening health outcomes, with immigrants delaying or skipping medical care rising from 22% in 2023 to 29% in 2025. This correlation between spikes in enforcement activity and measurable drops in healthcare utilization is well-documented. One Chicago community health organization reported that following the start of a new presidential term, 30% of patients did not attend their appointments, and there was a 40% reduction in medication pickup at their pharmacy. When analyzing legal status disparities among Latino immigrants in California, it was seen that legally vulnerable immigrants were deterred from seeking hospital-based care due to fear of detection and deportation, thus contributing to disparities in preventive care.

Overall, undocumented immigrants are likely to be uninsured due to lack of employer-sponsored insurance and ineligibility for Medicare, Medicaid, CHIP, and PPACA Marketplaces. Health benefits are largely contingent on immigrant parents in that although a child may be born in the U.S., the naturalization process for adults can take between 5 and 10 years. Since welfare reform initiatives like the Personal Responsibility and Work Opportunity Reconciliation Act have been enacted, states have seen an overall decline in the number of children being vaccinated.

In August 2019, the United States Citizenship and Immigration Services announced the discontinuation of the medical deferred action policy that grants temporary protection from deportation to immigrants undertaking major, life-saving procedures. However, in September 2019, this decision was reverted after drawing substantial criticisms from advocacy groups.

==== Financial costs ====
Financial costs of health care are cited as a barrier to access, especially as they can be complicated by immigration status. A study by Nathan Gray and his colleagues found that immigrants who cannot access hospice care often must rely on more expensive choices such as hospitalization or emergency services instead. Bureaucratic procedures, such as extensive paperwork, may deter immigrants from seeking health care due to both the cost of completion and lack of familiarity.

The financial costs of health coverage are also often correlated with lack of insurance. Studies have shown a connection between the lack of coverage and higher poverty rates. In their research, Julia Prentice, Anne Pebley, and Narayan Sastry reported that immigrants are less likely to be insured than native-born citizens. Prentice, Pebley, and Sastry also found that immigrants tend to share more characteristic qualities of those who are uninsured and often of lower socioeconomic status. These include lower levels of education attainment, income, and ownership of non-housing assets. Additionally, lack of enrollment in public programs or health plans has been observed to disproportionately affect those in low-income families. Low-income immigrants are over two times more likely to lack health insurance than low-income citizens.

Systemic Bias

Immigration Policy implemented at several levels of governance and perceptions that develop due to those policies have more than negative physical impacts on immigrant health, but systemic effects as well. Given that citizenship status decides who has access to civic and political representation, immigrants tend to be denied access to numerous resources that promote health, as well as tools used to enact structural change and increase access. For instance, the decennial census, utilized to provide "legislative representation, resource allocation, and public health surveillance," regardless of citizenship status, is now excluding undocumented and mixed-status households, due to efforts by the Trump administration. Additionally, the threat of detention and deportation systemically deters engagement in any health services remaining. It leads to the criminalization of immigrants and thus a multitude of negative impacts, including social exclusion and systemically racist perceptions of the healthcare field and within the healthcare field.

Effect of Immigration policy on patient response and provider treatment:

Research indicates that physician trust in the United States has decreased in the last 50 years. A key correlation for this relates this finding to the support for lowering immigration numbers to the United States and a number of physician trust metrics. It can be argued that restrictive and biased immigration policies may shape not only public perceptions but also the climate in which it is delivered. Restrictive views on immigration correlate with diminished trust in physicians' competence, honesty, and commitment to patient welfare. Conversely, patient response can be influenced by increased immigration policy restrictions. Patients may reduce care-seeking behavior, preventive services, or increase distrust in providers due to fears of discrimination or legal consequences.

=== Social barriers ===
==== Language ====
A study by Janice Tsoh reported that immigrants with limited English proficiency (LEP) and health literacy were more likely to rate their health status as poor. LEP is often correlated with experienced discrimination in medical care, as well. Studies have found that perceptions of discrimination have decreased among immigrants with LEP from the early 2000s to 2017. However, LEP patients may experience greater difficulties than English-proficient patients with communicating information with their practitioners. Furthermore, language proficiency can determine the types of treatments, exams, and other health services that Latino immigrants receive. Studies demonstrate that Latina patients were more likely receive recommendations for Pap smears and similar screenings from their doctors if their level of English proficiency was higher.

Moreover, a study in Greater Boston revealed that language barriers proved it extremely challenging for immigrants to get medical care. It was found that immigrants at various stages of engagement with the healthcare system, such as the coverage enrollment process, use of the coverage, and provider interactions, all encountered some type of language-related barrier.

Additionally, those who identify as having limited language proficiency are less likely to have a usual place to go when ill or for preventative check-ups. According to a study that looked at self-reported health status among Hispanic adults in the U.S., it was found that Mexican, Puerto Rican, Cuban, Dominican, and other Hispanic individuals who opted to answer a survey in Spanish were more likely than their English-speaking counterparts to report a poor/fair health status. Limited language proficiency can also lead to barriers obtaining health information, following prescription instructions, and using preventative services.

Linguistic difficulties can prevent immigrants from completing health insurance and medical forms. A study of Korean immigrants demonstrated that language barriers and uninsured status were major obstacles to utilizing healthcare in the United States. Additionally, LEP can limit employment to a small range of certain jobs, often those that are less likely to provide job-based insurance.

==== Social and cultural familiarity ====
Unfamiliarity with the U.S. health care system has been repeatedly cited as a barrier to health care for undocumented immigrants. Hesitance to seek health services may also result from the perceived stigma associated with immigrants' utilization of welfare. A 2003 study found that Asian and Latino immigrants who seek healthcare are more likely to report discrimination than U.S. nationals, even when adjusted for ethnicity.

Additionally, some research indicates that barriers may exist according to a group's cultural beliefs. For example, a 1992 study of Southeast Asian refugees revealed that participants tended to be less forthcoming in seeking health care due to perceived relative urgencies of pain and discomfort. Values of stoicism and differences in disease etiology were also considered as potentially in conflict with perceptions of practicality of Western health care. Additionally, in a 2016 study of Asian immigrants, Luo Huabin found that participants with higher levels of acculturation were more likely to seek routine oral health care.

== Health care in immigration detention centers ==
According to a 2018 report by the American Immigration Council, the number of immigrants detained by U.S. Immigration and Customs Enforcement (ICE) has increased by over five times within twenty years. Immigration detention has been cited for repeated violations of human rights, including physical and sexual abuse, insufficient or denial of medical care, and substandard living conditions. Health conditions and medical services have also received increasing attention in news coverage due to reports of premature deaths of those who had been held in detention.

=== Hygiene and sanitation ===
A report from the Office of Inspector General at the Department of Homeland Security found that, out of five officially inspected detention facilities, four failed to meet proper standards for medical care and sanitary conditions. Inspectors noted that several detention center bathrooms had mold in the showers. Multiple detention facilities in Texas were similarly cited for poor hygienic conditions. Specifically, children did not have regular opportunities to shower or use soap to wash their hands while distributed clothing was also inadequate or dirty, with some children having to wear only diapers. Furthermore, detainees reported that some were not provided with hygiene supplies, such as soap, toothpaste, and toilet paper, and did not have access to hot water.

An inspection of two detention centers in Georgia indicated that food and water conditions were deemed unsanitary. Specifically, detainees reported that provided food was often spoiled, under-cooked, rancid, or found to contain objects such as bugs, debris, hair, teeth, and mice. Many detainees also observed malnutrition and rapid weight loss. As well, according to the 2011 Performance-Based National Detention Standards published by ICE, detainees with diabetes or other health conditions are to be provided with an appropriately suited diet. However, multiple detainees received meals that were not adjusted to compensate for medical dietary restrictions.

=== Medical services ===
Investigative journalists and advocacy groups such as the American Civil Liberties Union (ACLU) have expressed concerns of systemic sub-standard and neglectful medical treatments in detention centers, reporting that detention facilities often deliver medical services with long wait times and delays. Medical experts report that detainees with serious conditions such as pneumonia are similarly subjected to long wait times and do not receive proper care nor pain management. Detainees often report receiving insufficient treatments and services, as well. Patients in various detention centers stated that they were denied surgeries due to delays by ICE or other forms of care such as physical exams and biopsies, receiving only pain killers instead.

CNBC reported that, as of August 2019, detention facilities do not currently nor plan to administer vaccines to detained individuals. Health professionals have criticized this policy, attributing it to outbreaks among detainees. In 2019, at least three detained children died from complications of contracting influenza while in detention. A study by Aiden Varan and his colleagues also found that ICE detainees were particularly susceptible to contracting chicken pox due to increased exposure in facilities. A study in the Center for Disease Control's Morbidity and Mortality Weekly Report indicated increasing outbreaks of mumps in facilities, as well. Both studies concluded that health initiatives that incorporated targeted vaccination efforts could mitigate the frequency of outbreaks.

The Center for Immigrants' Rights Clinic reported that medical units in detention facilities were also severely understaffed, requiring some patients to travel to off-site centers for their treatments. The Human Rights Watch also reported that there had been cases where medical staff had treated patients in capacities outside of the scope of their training and licenses. Additionally, many medical practitioners in detention facilities are not multi-lingual, which impedes effective communication by patients who do not speak English. Various detention centers provide phone translation services for this purpose. Laura Redman, the director of the Health Justice Program at New York Lawyers for the Public Interest, reported that numerous detained clients were never instructed on how they could make sick calls if needed.

In August 2019, a class action lawsuit was filed against ICE and the U.S. District Court for the Central District of California. The suit alleged that ICE and other federal officials were cognizant of the conditions and quality of medical care inside detention facilities yet took no action to remedy this.

=== Mental health ===
A report from the Office of Inspector General has also indicated substandard treatment of detainees' mental health. Unsafe or isolating conditions can exacerbate mental health conditions such as depression or trauma, yet distrust, due to being forcibly detained, also prevents many immigrants from seeking mental health services.

Studies show children are particularly vulnerable to adverse impacts on mental health. A review by the American Academy of Pediatrics indicated that young detainees may demonstrate emotional problems and post-traumatic symptoms, which can negatively impact development. Charles Baily and his colleagues also found that negative experiences in detention centers, supplemented by difficulties encountered in migration, can increase children's risk for post-traumatic stress disorder (PTSD), anxiety, and depression.

Adults also report experiencing depression, self-harm, and post-traumatic symptoms. A review conducted by Kristen Ochoa found that detained immigrants with specific mental health needs were subjected to prolonged solitary confinement, restricted contact with family and friends, insufficient monitoring for detainees expressing suicidal ideation, and refusals to supply appropriately prescribed medications. In many reports, detainees with mental disabilities were observed as often physically restrained, shackled, or heavily medicated. The Center for Immigrants' Rights Clinic report indicated that most detainees were not informed of existing mental health services or how to file grievances. Many also expressed fear of being held in solitary confinement and thus did not express mental health concerns.

=== Reproductive and sexual health ===
==== Reproductive and sexual health access for immigrants ====
Immigrant women of reproductive age in the U.S. face significant challenges obtaining comprehensive and affordable health insurance coverage and care. Immigrant women are less likely to have coverage and use sexual and reproductive health services than U.S.-born women, which may increase their risk of negative outcomes.

Clinicians should explain that in the United States, women and adolescent girls have the right to access sexual and reproductive health services, including contraception. Education should be provided so that all new male arrivals understand that women (including adolescents) have a right to make independent decisions about their health (including sexual and reproductive health), and that these decisions are protected by US law.

==== Reproductive and sexual health violations within detention facilities ====
Despite healthcare being a human right, immigrants being held at detention facilities within the United States face additional barriers to reproductive and sexual health access.

A report by the Southern Poverty Law Center indicated that immigrants at LaSalle Detention Facility in Louisiana received insufficient menstrual products, such as sanitary pads and tampons. Media outlets such as The Daily Beast and Rewire News report that miscarriages and stillbirths amongst individuals in ICE custody have increased. Pregnant immigrants who suffered vaginal bleeding, breast pain, and ovarian cysts stated that they faced delays and neglect by medical personnel as well. The ACLU, American Immigration Council, and other immigration advocacy groups compiled a report of complaints regarding the treatment of multiple pregnant immigrants by ICE. This included inaccurate pregnancy tests, stress-inducing conditions, vaginal bleeding, denied requests for parole, insufficient nutrition, and shackling.

In interviews conducted by the Human Rights Watch, participating immigrants within detention facilities stated that they had been denied forms of gynecological care such as Pap smears, hormonal contraceptives, and mammograms.

Studies have found that detention facilities typically do not provide adequate screenings for HIV. Additionally, immigrants with HIV in detention centers reported that they had been denied proper and timely medication, which can allow the virus to develop resistance to drug treatments. Restricting or delaying HIV treatment can lead to a weakened immune system, thus making immigrants with HIV more susceptible to further infections in unsanitary conditions without sufficient care.

=== Public exposure of rights violations in detention centers ===
==== Demonstrations and protests ====
The barriers that immigrants face in health care settings are similar to the barriers that they face in communicating their health circumstances when detained in detention facilities. An article from The New York Times Magazine, describes the story of how detained immigrants located in a south Georgia detention center were able to devise and communicate a plan to protest against the facility and their officials during the COVID-19 pandemic. Although the women and men in this detention center were separated into different units, a collection of women wrote a letter that was then placed into an article of clothing that was being moved to the men's section of the facility. They wanted to stage this protest in order to demand safer protective measures against the virus and request that ICE "release the sick, elderly and high-risk among them." Not only were these individuals able to find ways to communicate with one another within the detention facility, but they also had a means of communicating with an investigative reporter who then wrote about their efforts to mobilize a protest and try to fulfill their requests. This particular detention center had a video visitation system which detainees utilized to speak with the investigative reporter who was then able to witness the unhealthy conditions that these people were forced to live in (such that these individuals were creating their own face masks because they were not granted any, as well as the ways guards would not wear masks when moving through the facility).

==== Whistleblowers ====
Whistleblowers are individuals who have played a significant role in communicating the unjust and illicit treatment of immigrants held within detention centers. An example includes a news article from The Guardian, which depicts the story of an immigrant woman who underwent a dilation and curettage (D&C) procedure after expressing to the doctor at the center her concerns about her menstrual health. After her procedure, the doctor explained how one of her tubes were tied and how she may not be able to have children in the future. The woman was emotionally distraught and expressed how she had not given consent for the procedure to be done. A nurse by the name of Dawn Wooten filed a whistleblower report that claimed the doctor at the center was performing "an alarmingly high-rates of hysterectomies... on Spanish-speaking women" which herself and others nurses felt did not fully understand the procedures were being done to them. It is through the efforts of whistleblowers that these kinds of injustices are brought to the attention of the public and because of their reports, the general masses are able to become more informed on the living conditions and health matters of immigrants within these detention centers which they do not have direct access to.

== Public opinion ==
=== Support for immigrant health care benefits ===
Proponents of immigrant health care reform contend that children of immigrant families are like native-born children in their need for security in health and nutrition; as such, they argue that the current state of health care access does not appropriately reflect national interest. Proponents also argue that, because immigrants can also join the health sector's work force, their inclusion in receiving benefits is necessary in servicing the expanding population. Additionally, other arguments of support note that limited accessibility of care requires immigrants to seek care through emergency services, which ultimately results in delays in major diagnoses until the later stages of an affliction, thereby increasing a community's level of disease.

A fact report published by the Immigration Policy Center in 2009 also suggests that increased immigrant participation in the United States' health care system yields monetary benefits. Proponents argue that expanding eligibility to include immigrants in the health care system would spread the costs of sustaining public benefits, creating more available tax dollars to alleviate the financial costs of Social Security and Medicare.

=== Opposition to immigrant health care benefits ===
Opponents argue that immigrants to the United States intend to take advantage of public benefits and therefore favor legislation that implements more restrictions. Alternatively, others statethat health care benefits should be limited given their burden on the federal budget. There is some concern that legislative acts like EMTALA, in ensuring emergency medical care to all, lack clarity in defining what constitutes an "emergency". As such, minor health issues such as migraines—as opposed to emergencies like gunshot wounds and cardiac arrest—are included and hurt hospitals due to the lack of additional government compensation.

==== Healthy Migrant Theory ====
Although immigrant populations have increasingly become the foci for analyzing health disparities, the issue of providing care within the context of the patient's cultural background was contested by studies that completely denied the presence of rising health issues in immigrants due to inadequate health services. In 1986, theorists Kyriakos Markides and Jeannine Coreil developed the idea of the Healthy Migrant theory that thought of migration to include an inherent selection process due to the physical and psychological demands of travel, searching for employment, and adjusting to new cultural norm. This paradox theorized that despite the social disadvantages of transitioning into a new country especially for ethnic minority groups, there is an inherent physical and psychological robustness in immigrants compared to populations in both their home country and the United States, this is known as the Healthy Migrant Theory.

Although the data that supported the Healthy Migrant Theory converged on the idea that general immigrants arrived to the United States healthier than native-born Americans, the theory does not take into consideration the populations that immigrate to the United States for necessity, such as refugees, undocumented immigrants, or families looking for academic or financial opportunity. The Healthy Migrant Theory assumes that immigrants are able to successfully transition their lives in America, become fluent in English, or retain their health status. Consequently, continuous studies have found evidence of the uniform decline of immigrants' health advantage as the number of years in the U.S. increases until about 10 years in when health conditions align with the level of native born populations, the presence of cultural barriers could perpetuate the decline especially in immigrant populations that suffer from acculturative stress in their new country.

== Policy reform and proposals ==
In 2003, the federal government created a proposal to fund hospitals over a four-year period to cover emergency treatment for uninsured and undocumented immigrants, but required asking for patients' citizenship statuses. This proposal was ultimately withdrawn due to the belief that such a policy would delay immigrants from actively seeking care unless in extreme need, thereby contributing to overall higher incidences of medical problems in a community.

In 2005 and 2006, the Senate and House of Representatives proposed bills to criminalize health care providers who service undocumented immigrants. The American Medical Association passed a policy called "Opposition to Criminalization of Medical Care Provided to Undocumented Immigrant Patients" in response.

Policy proposals to expand health care benefits focus on allocating more funds to community health centers and to SCHIP and/or state programs. Similarly, another proposal specifically targets increased funding for prenatal care, with studies showing that preventative care acts as a cost-effective solution to overall health care costs. Finally, policies to enhance insurance affordability for workers have been proposed to potentially reduce coverage disparities, given that a large proportion of immigrants are less likely to be covered than native-born citizens. Studies indicate the overall effectiveness of state-funded coverage programs can reduce the immigrant-citizen health care disparities when compounded with other efforts such as health promotion and reduced enrollment barriers.

Public health scholars have acknowledged that certain marginalized groups, including immigrants, experience a lower quality of healthcare. Laura Uba proposes that culturally competent healthcare for immigrants can be delivered through improved provider education on communication patterns, others' perceptions of health and fatality, and traditional folk medicines. Narrative medicine is a growing field that seeks to better educate medical professionals to see patients as complex individuals rather than an isolated set of symptoms. Proponents believe this practice can reduce the discrimination immigrants face at the hands of healthcare providers, but implementation remains an obstacle. Proposals vary from the employment of "cultural translators" to mandating cultural education and listening practice by medical professionals. Patient-centered care, which primarily focuses on improving communication between providers and marginalized patients, is considered a more feasible approach. This is achieved through preparing medical professionals to be attentive listeners, ask open-ended questions, and practice power-sharing during patient interactions.

== See also ==
- Emergency Medical Treatment and Active Labor Act
- Healthcare availability for undocumented immigrants in the United States
- Healthcare reform debate in the United States
- Illegal immigration to the United States
- Immigration reform
- Immigration to the United States
- Inequality within immigrant families in the United States
- Multiculturalism
- Naturalization
- Personal Responsibility and Work Opportunity Reconciliation Act
- State Children's Health Insurance Program
- United States immigration statistics
