= Undocumented immigrant population of the United States =

The undocumented immigrant population of the United States is the number of resident unauthorized immigrants living on United States territory. The number of such immigrants, and their specific countries of origin, has always been difficult to determine, and the U.S. federal government has never undertaken an official count of such individuals. Estimates of this population, derived from national surveys, administrative data, and other sources of information, vary widely. By all measures, the population of undocumented immigrants in the U.S. declined substantially from 2007 until at least 2018. The Pew Research Center reported that the number of border apprehensions declined considerably after 2000, reaching a low in 2017. However, apprehensions rebounded to reach a new peak level in 2021. In a 2025 report, Pew estimated that the population of undocumented immigrants in the U.S. had risen to 14 million in 2023.

A Pew report estimated that about 9% of all births in 2023 were to unauthorized or temporary immigrant mothers.

== Size ==
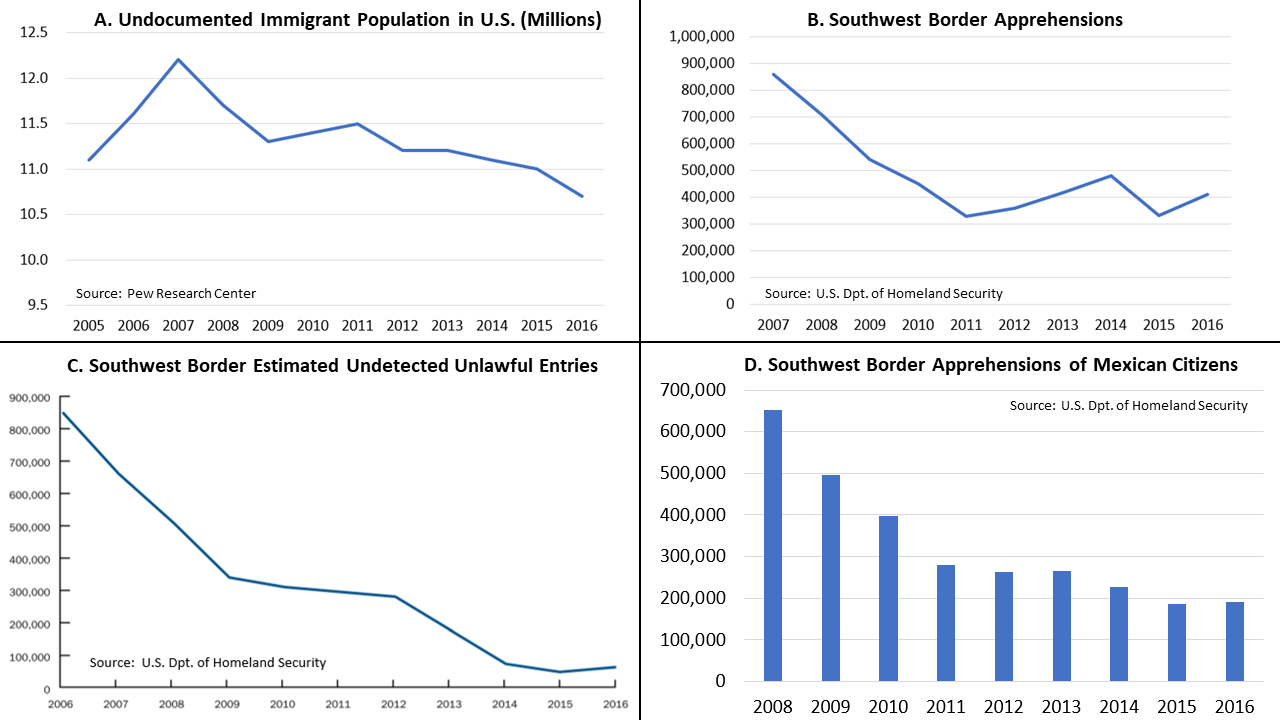
Until the last few years, the population of undocumented immigrants in the U.S. and southwestern border apprehensions had declined significantly over the previous decade; since then border apprehensions have exceeded 2007 levels.

In 1980 the undocumented immigrant population was estimated at 2.06 million and "at least fewer than 6 million", half were from Mexico in this year. During the 1990s, according to the nonpartisan Pew Research Center, the number rose rapidly; "from an estimated 3.5 million in 1990 to a peak of 12.2 million in 2007," then dropped sharply during the Great Recession before stabilizing in 2009. Pew estimated the total population to be 11.1 million in 2014, or approximately 3 percent of the U.S. population. This "is in the same ballpark" as figures from the United States Department of Homeland Security (DHS), which estimated that 11.4 million undocumented immigrants lived in the United States in January 2012. The estimate and trends are also consistent with figures reported by the Center for Migration Studies, which reported that the U.S. undocumented immigrant population fell to 10.9 million by January 2016, the lowest number since 2003. A 2018 paper by three Yale School of Management professors estimated that the undocumented immigrant population was in the range of 16 million to 29 million; however, the methodology presented in the Yale study has been criticized as leading to vastly overstated results. In a 2016 report, the Pew Research Center had estimated that some 11.1 million undocumented immigrants were living in the U.S. in 2014. In 2025, Pew announced that "the number of unauthorized immigrants in the United States reached an all-time high of 14 million in 2023 after two consecutive years of growth".

=== Estimation method ===
The "residual method" is widely used to estimate the undocumented immigrant population of the U.S. With this method, the known number of legally documented immigrants to the United States is subtracted from the reported U.S. Census number of self-proclaimed foreign-born people (based on immigration records and adjusted by projections of deaths and out-migration) to obtain the total undocumented immigrant (residual) population. This methodology is used by the U.S. Department of Homeland Security, the Pew Hispanic Center, the Center for Immigration Studies, and the United States Census Bureau. Since undocumented immigrants have many reasons for not answering the U.S. Census correctly and since penalties for answering the U.S. Census incorrectly are rarely enforced, it is accepted that it under-counts the number of undocumented immigrants. The users of this methodology assume that 10% of undocumented immigrants are not counted by census takers. The 10% assumption is based on a 2001 University of California survey asked of 829 people born in Mexico and living in Los Angeles whether they responded to census interviewers in the 2000 census with 40% of queried households refusing to answer the survey. Critics claim that the estimate is unreliable for a number of reasons: figures for outmigration are not tracked by the federal government; the proportion of undocumented immigrants who respond to the Census is unknown; the estimate that 10% of undocumented immigrants do not respond to the census is arbitrary and unsupported by a sufficient sample size and geographic spread; and that the self-reporting of where one was born relies on the honesty of the person being questioned.

Estimates of this population are generally based on modeling using data from the American Community Survey (ACS) or the Current Population Survey conducted each year by the United States Census Bureau.

A 2018 paper by three Yale School of Management professors yielded similar trajectories of the undocumented immigrant population, with peak growth in the 1990s and early 2000s followed by a plateau from approximately 2008 onward. However, their model yielded an estimate of the numbers of undocumented immigrants of 22.1 million — roughly twice as great as the estimates based on the ACS. Moreover, according to the three authors, their estimate has a 95 percent probability range of 16 million to 29 million. That result, however, was criticized for vastly overstating the true number and for failing to account for the circular flow rate.

== Impact of the Great Recession ==
The Great Recession had a large impact on the United States. The construction sector and other areas where undocumented immigrants traditionally seek employment shrank. The recession also led to a surplus of American labor, driving down the benefit of hiring undocumented immigrants. According to the Pew Research Center, in 2007 the number of unauthorized Mexican immigrants peaked at 6.9 million and has dropped by more than 1 million to an estimated 5.6 million in 2014.

After the Great Recession, more immigrants actually returned to Mexico rather than migrated to the United States. From 2009 to 2014, 1 million Mexicans and their families left the U.S. for Mexico. U.S. census data for the same period show an estimated 870,000 Mexican nationals left Mexico to return to the U.S. It is hard to track of this because there is no official number of immigrants going to the United States or returning to Mexico every year.

== Characteristics ==
Since about 2014, most undocumented immigrants living in the U.S. have been long-term residents. In 2014, about two-thirds (66%) had been in the U.S. for ten years or more, while just 14% had been in the U.S. for less than five years.

Just as the total population of undocumented immigrants in the U.S. has declined since 2007, the proportion of undocumented immigrants in the workforce has also declined; in 2012, undocumented immigrants made up 5.1% of the United States' civilian labor force. Unauthorized immigrant workers are over-represented in certain economic sectors, making up 26% of farming, fisheries, and forest workers; 17% of cleaning, maintenance, and groundskeeping workers; 14% of construction workers; and 11% of food preparation workers.

== Undocumented Mexican Immigrants ==
As of 2017, the majority of undocumented immigrants are not Mexicans, with the percentage of undocumented immigrants that are Mexican steadily declining over recent years.

The number of Mexican legal and undocumented immigrants in the United States grew quite rapidly over the 35 years between 1970 and 2004; increasing almost 15-fold from about 760,000 in the 1970 Census to more than 11 million in 2004—an average annual growth rate of more than 8 percent, maintained over more than three decades. On average the net Mexican population, both documented and undocumented, living in the United States has grown by about 500,000 per year from 1995 to 2005 with 80 to 85 percent of the growth attributed to unauthorized immigration. There was a net gain of 2,270,000 Mexican immigrants to the U.S. between 1995 and 2000; a net loss of about 20,000 between 2005 and 2010; and a net loss of 140,000 between 2009 and 2014.

The total number of Mexicans residing in the U.S., with and without authorization, was 11.7 million in 2014, down from the peak of 12.8 million in 2007. The drop is primarily the result of the decrease in the number of unauthorized migrants—which make up 48% of the Mexican population in the U.S. in 2014, down from 54% in 2007.

== Undocumented APIDA/A Immigrants ==
Asian Pacific Islanders Desi Americans/ Asians (APIDA/As) are the largest racial/ ethnic group of immigrants in the U.S., making up 40% of the migrant population. Similar to other racial and ethnic groups in the United States, APIDA/A's have been subjected to racial discrimination through the Geary Act which was a law that extended the Chinese Exclusion Act prohibiting Chinese from legally immigrating to the United States. Additionally, APIDA/A's have been weaponized as the model minority and still to this present day viewed as perpetual foreigners which has affected society's views on undocumented immigrants in the United States. Although Mexican Americans have a long history regarding immigration that significantly contributes to the documented/ undocumented migration population in the United States; it is important to acknowledge APIDA/A immigration and their significance to the U.S. demographic.

The United States first saw a rise in Chinese immigration in the 1860's during the recruitment of the Central Pacific Railroad seeking cheap labor to build the Transcontinental Railroad. During this time labor became very competitive between white labor and Chinese labor which resulted in Yellow Peril – this racist depiction viewed (in this case) Chinese laborers as a danger/ threat to the Western world. However, this was only the beginning of racial discrimination for APIDA/A's. In 1882 congress passed the Chinese Exclusion Act, a federal law that prohibited immigration of Chinese laborers for 10 years and in 1892, congress passed the Geary Act as an extension of the Exclusion Act by adding additional requirements such as mandating Chinese Americans to carry a resident permit, failure to do so would result in deportation. It wasn't until 1943 when Chinese immigrants could be eligible for citizenships and at the very least could be naturalized. Although there were many other laws that contributed to racial discrimination against Asian immigration, these historical events set a precedent subjecting APIDA/A's to being continuously portrayed as the perpetual foreigner.

According to the Center of Migration Studies (CMS), there are approximately 1.7 million undocumented APIDA/A immigrants in the United States. Based on AAPI Data, between the years 2000 and 2015 the population of undocumented immigrants based on regions of origin has significantly increased with immigrants from Asia increasing its population by 3.5x in the 15 years span. In contrast, the increase of undocumented immigrants from Central America (3x), Africa (2.6x), Caribbean (1.9x), South America (1.4x), and finally Mexico (1.2x). To go further into detail CMS reported India and China having the highest population of undocumented immigrants in the United States in 2015. More specifically, India being the origin country of 458,663 undocumented individuals, following China with 387,369 and the Philippines (247,304), South Korea (174,677), Vietnam (123,060), Pakistan (49,555), and "other Asian countries" (297,007). To put these numbers into a better perspective; 1 out of every 7 APIDA/A immigrants is undocumented.

Living all throughout the U.S., the majority of undocumented APIDA/As reside in California (463, 310), New York (166, 806), Texas (148, 612), New Jersey (115, 680), Illinois ( 71, 403), Virginia (58, 218), Florida (58, 184), and Washington (56, 987) according to CMS. Furthermore, the Pew Research Center conducted a survey between 2022–2023 and asked APIDA/A's why they chose to immigrate and as a result, 28% stated that they came to the U.S. to reunite with family, 27% sought out economic opportunities, 26% immigrate to pursue education, and 7% sought refuge. As these reasons somewhat explain the increase in undocumented immigrants in the APIDA/A community, stereotypes such as the model minority myth; the monolithic belief that all Asians are the model other immigrants must abide by pin APIDA/A's against other immigration movements and communities (such as Black and Mexican American immigrants). In addition, these racial stereotypes and perceived identities erase the true stories of undocumented APIDA/A's.

== 2014 status ==
1. Out of the entire workforce in the United States, 8 million were undocumented immigrants. This number includes immigrants who either found work illegally or are working in people's households under their order. Five percent of those immigrants were unemployed and looking for work.
2. Mexicans made up 52% of all undocumented immigrants in 2014. There were 5.8 million Mexican undocumented immigrants living in the U.S. that year, down from 6.4 million in 2009, according to the latest Pew Research Center estimates.
3. California, Texas, Florida, New York, New Jersey and Illinois accounted for 59% of undocumented immigrants in 2014. Of the entire U.S. population, 40% lived in those states.

== See also ==
- Illegal immigration to the United States
- Undocumented youth in the United States
