= My Health LA =

No-cost health care for Los Angeles County residents

My Health LA (abbreviated MHLA) was a no-cost health care program of the Los Angeles County Department of Health Services, designed to benefit between 400,000 and 700,000 Los Angeles County residents who were ineligible for Medi-Cal at the time, most of those being undocumented immigrants. It was launched on October 1, 2014 and ran until January 31, 2024, after access to Medi-Cal was expanded. MHLA succeeded the County's previous program, Healthy Way LA, which ran from 2007 until 2014.

The program established a network of community clinics who provided primary care needs for enrolled patients under the medical home model, with incentives to providers to coordinate care and manage utilization. The Los Angeles County Board of Supervisors allocated US$55,000,000 in annual funding to support the program.

As of September 2016, MHLA had enrolled 147,314 patients.

== See also ==
- Healthcare in California
- Healthcare availability for undocumented immigrants in the United States
- Immigrant health care in the United States
- Los Angeles County Department of Health Services
