= Janice Tsoh =

Chinese-American clinical psychologist

- Born: Hong Kong, China
- Education: Binghamton University (B.A.); University of Rhode Island (M.A., Ph.D.)
- Scientific career
- Fields: Clinical psychology
- Workplaces: University of California, San Francisco; Langley Porter Psychiatric Institute

Janice Y. Tsoh is a Chinese-American clinical psychologist and a professor of psychiatry at the University of California, San Francisco Weill Institute for Neurosciences.

== Early life and education ==
Tsoh is from Hong Kong, completed a B.A. in psychology from Binghamton University in 1990. In 1993, Tsoh earned an M.A. in clinical psychology from University of Rhode Island (URI). She conducted a residency in clinical psychology from 1994 to 1995 at University of Mississippi Medical Center. She earned a Ph.D. in clinical psychology from URI in 1995. She conducted postdoctoral studies in cancer prevention at University of Texas MD Anderson Cancer Center from 1995 to 1997. Tsoh was a postdoc studying substance abuse at University of California, San Francisco (UCSF) from 1997 to 1999. She completed a certificate in clinical research from UCSF in 2001 to 2002.

== Career ==
Tsoh began her UCSF career as an assistant research psychologist in 1999. Her current work focuses on promoting health equity by empowering individuals to make informed health decisions, such quitting tobacco use or obtaining needed cancer screenings. Her teaching and mentorship focuses on groups underrepresented in the field of tobacco control or other health disciplines, and many focus on diverse populations. She is an attending medical staff at the Langley Porter Psychiatric Institute.
