= Healthcare availability for undocumented immigrants in the United States =

Healthcare availability for undocumented immigrants in the United States varies by area and other factors. Undocumented immigrants face significant barriers to healthcare, including low socioeconomic status, difficulty negotiating time off of work, lack of transportation, and language barriers. Having medical insurance coverage—whether private or through Medicaid—significantly influences the actual utilization of healthcare services.

Only a handful of municipalities in the United States offer health care coverage for undocumented immigrants, including Los Angeles County's My Health LA program, and San Francisco's Healthy San Francisco. The lack of coverage of undocumented immigrants has shown increases in spread of preventable diseases. The lack of funding of prenatal care in undocumented women has also been calculated in being more expensive in the long run. A considerable portion of the United States' population is foreign-born. Undocumented immigrants make up about 28% of the foreign-born residents. A model analyzing data from 1990-2016 estimates the number of undocumented immigrants in the United States range from 16.7 million to 22.1 million.

== Overview ==
Estimates suggest as of 2010 there are approximately 11.2 million undocumented immigrants living in the United States, some of whom have U.S. citizen family members. This has resulted in a number of "mixed status" families concentrated in states such as California, Florida, New York and Texas, as well as newer immigrant destination states such as Illinois and Georgia. Within these mixed-status families there are often inequalities in access to a variety of resources, including healthcare.

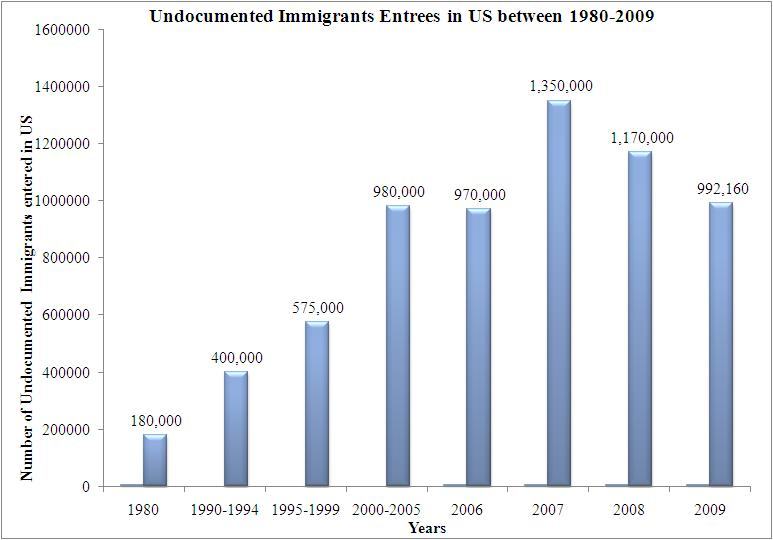
Undocumented Immigrant Entrees in U.S. between 1980-2009

== Health care usage ==
Many undocumented immigrants delay or do not get necessary health care, which is related to their barriers to health insurance coverage.

According to study conducted using data from the 2003 California Health Interview Survey, of the Mexicans and other Latinos surveyed, undocumented immigrants had the lowest rates of health insurance and healthcare usage and were the youngest in age overall. In fact, the study found that overall undocumented Mexicans had 1.6 fewer physician visits and undocumented Latinos had 2.1 fewer physician visits compared to their U.S.-born counterparts. Some scholars have attributed this lower usage of healthcare services to the "Hispanic Epidemiological Paradox" where the health outcomes of Hispanic and Latino Americans have been found to be comparable or better than white Americans, paradoxical to their lower socioeconomic status. However, others point to the negative experiences of undocumented groups when seeking medical treatment or other forms of healthcare service. For example, this same study from the 2003 California Health Interview Survey found that both undocumented immigrants—Mexican and other Latinos—were more likely to report negative experiences with healthcare providers and less likely to have a regular source of care because of such experiences. Meanwhile, US-born Latinos with U.S. citizenship were more likely to self-report their health as good or excellent and more likely to have visited a physician in the last year.

Findings on the use of specific healthcare services by undocumented immigrants have been more varied. For example, this same California 2004 study found that undocumented immigrants are significantly less likely than naturalized citizens and U.S.-born-citizens to visit the emergency department. These findings are supported by a study conducted in 2000 using data from a 1996 survey of undocumented Latino immigrants in four U.S. cities: Houston and El Paso, Texas and Fresno and Los Angeles, California. This study found that undocumented immigrants obtain fewer ambulatory physician visits than other Latinos or the rest of the U.S. population collectively. Additionally, for those undocumented immigrants who did regularly visit a physician, their rates at three or four visits per year were still lower than those of Latinos at six visits per year. In regards to Medicaid, this study found that "With approximately 2 million undocumented immigrants in California, even 10 to 15 percent of them on Medicaid would represent only 4% of total Medicaid eligible statewide." On the other hand, findings from the 2009 California Health Interview Survey indicate that no significant differences have been found in the diagnoses of undocumented immigrants for diabetes, heart disease, or high blood pressure compared to documented immigrants, naturalized citizens or U.S.-born citizens.

=== Expenditures ===
While there is less information available on undocumented immigrants, research shows that immigrants have substantially lower overall healthcare expenditures than U.S.-born persons. In 1998, the per capita total health care expenditure amount spent on immigrants was 55% lower than that spent on their U.S.-born counterparts and 74% lower for their children. Moreover, immigrant healthcare expenditure totaled $39.5 billion that year constituting only 7.9% of the U.S. total. These lower expenditures have raised a number of questions about the accessibility of health care services and insurance to both documented and undocumented immigrants.

=== Barriers to access ===
Undocumented immigrants face a number of economic, social and political barriers in accessing healthcare services. In a literature review about health care for undocumented immigrants, it documents 3 major areas that act as barriers for healthcare: Policy, health system, and individual related issues. We can see in the following table how they divided these sections, as well as what percent of articles in the literature review discussed these issues.

Barriers to health care experienced by undocumented immigrants
Category	Subcategory	Number of articles (%)
Policy arena	Law/insurance	76
	Need for documentation	27
Health system	External resource constrains	36
	Discrimination	33
	Bureaucracy	26
Individual level	Fear of deportation	65
	Communication ability	36
	Financial resources	45
	Shame/stigma	11
	Knowledge of the health care system	33

==== Employment factors ====
From an economic standpoint, undocumented immigrants in the United States are often employed in jobs in either the secondary or informal sectors of the labor market. Subject to influences of the larger international economic system, firms in the secondary sector often offer undocumented immigrants a sense of ethnic solidarity and opportunities for upward economic mobility in exchange for few social benefits and lower pay. Similarly, undocumented immigrants employed in the informal sector after often provided scarce health benefits, if given medical insurance at all while simultaneously relying on temporary contract work or other self-employment or small-business employment opportunities. Given their wages, these limited employment options also limit the ability of undocumented immigrants to meet financial requirements for accessing private healthcare coverage. All of these factors combined result in the unlikelihood that undocumented immigrants will have government-funded health insurance, have private medical insurance, or be able to cover medical costs through their own financial resources. In fact, even for work-related injuries, it is often difficult for undocumented immigrants to receive or gain access to treatment.

==== Socioeconomic status ====
The U.S. Department of Health and Human Services provided new federal guidelines to determine financial eligibility for social service benefits for those living below the poverty line. These guidelines, though slightly different are comparable to those in 2007 in regards to household income. While most Hispanics have some sort of employment, the largest group of Mexicans and Latinos living below the federal poverty level in 2007 was the undocumented immigrants at 50 percent of their population, followed by green-card holders, naturalized citizens, and U.S.-born Mexicans. In comparison, in 2007 approximately five percent of U.S.-born whites were living at less than 100% of the federal poverty level. These patterns speak to the long-term influence of legal status on access to healthcare services.

==== Language barriers and ethnicity ====
Socially, undocumented immigrants also confront language barriers daily and other cultural barriers in accessing healthcare. In the 2003 analysis from the California Health Interview Survey they found of all Mexican and Latino immigrants, undocumented immigrants had the highest rates of noting difficulty understanding their physician during their last visit. During these visits these undocumented immigrants also felt they would receive better care were they of a different race or ethnicity. Every race, including European-Americans say that. As a result of the language barrier, there were notable disparities in the health of children of ethnic minorities. Some notable differences were, but are not limited to: increases in mortality rates, decreased quality of care, use of services, organ transplants, and decreased chronic disease care.

=== Federal Policy Exclusions ===
The policy environment governing access to healthcare for undocumented immigrants has long been complex and has become increasingly restrictive due to the defunding of public health agencies and safety net programs.

In 1952, Congress passed the Immigration and Nationality Act (INA), which formally codified the "public charge" ground of inadmissibility to the United States (INA §212(a)(4)). The public charge rule states that a foreign national is inadmissible if they are likely to become primarily dependent on the government for subsistence. The interpretation of this rule has varied significantly by administration. Under President Clinton, it was narrowly defined to include only cash assistance or long-term institutional care. Under President Trump (2019), it was broadened to include non-cash benefits such as Medicaid. Under President Biden, it reverted to the narrower Clinton-era interpretation.

In 1996, the Personal Responsibility and Work Opportunity Reconciliation Act (PRWORA) prohibited undocumented immigrants from accessing most federal public benefits, including Medicare, non-emergency Medicaid, and the Children's Health Insurance Program (CHIP) (8 U.S.C. §1611(a)). PRWORA allowed undocumented immigrants access to emergency Medicaid only for treatment necessary to prevent death or serious harm (8 U.S.C. §1611(b)(1)(A)). This restriction aligns with the Emergency Medical Treatment and Labor Act (EMTALA), which requires hospitals to provide emergency medical care regardless of immigration status or ability to pay.

The Affordable Care Act (ACA), passed in 2010, significantly expanded healthcare coverage, reducing the uninsured rate from 16% in 2010 to 8% by 2021. However, the ACA explicitly prohibited undocumented immigrants from purchasing insurance through ACA marketplaces, even at full cost without subsidies (42 U.S.C. §18032(f)(3)).

== Political debate ==
The use of public services by undocumented immigrants, including healthcare, has been tied into the larger national debate over immigration while simultaneously lying at the intersection of two contentious debates involving health reform and immigration reform. Proponents of more restrictive service use policies have argued that lax immigration policies will encourage more undocumented immigrants to relocate to the United States. They also argue healthcare policies which make insurance, coverage, and treatment more accessible to all populations will encourage undocumented immigrants to overuse services without contributing their fair share to the tax base, ultimately placing an unjust burden on the general public. Meanwhile, both taxpayers and politicians point to state welfare and Medicaid programs as specific areas of concern when it comes to such healthcare use by undocumented populations.

Research has found that because immigrants come to the United States primarily in search of employment, excluding undocumented immigrants from receiving government-funded healthcare services will not reduce the number of immigrants. Those who support more inclusive healthcare policies argue such provisions would ultimately harm the well-being of U.S.-born children living in mixed status households, since these policies have made it more difficult for these children to receive care. Impeding undocumented immigrants from receiving health care has been shown to increase the spread of preventable diseases through communities. Financial justification for withholding services does not appear feasible. A study from the UCLA School of Public Health showed that eliminating public funds for prenatal care for undocumented pregnant women led to greater use of public funds for the health care of these women and their children in the long run. The National Research Council concluded that immigrants collectively add as much as $10 billion to the national economy each year, paying on average $80,000 per capita more in taxes than they use in government services over their lifetimes, and these patterns of expenditures and usage also extend to undocumented immigrants. The ongoing debate and subsequent policy-decisions have important implications for the healthcare of undocumented immigrants residing in the United States.

== Policy context ==
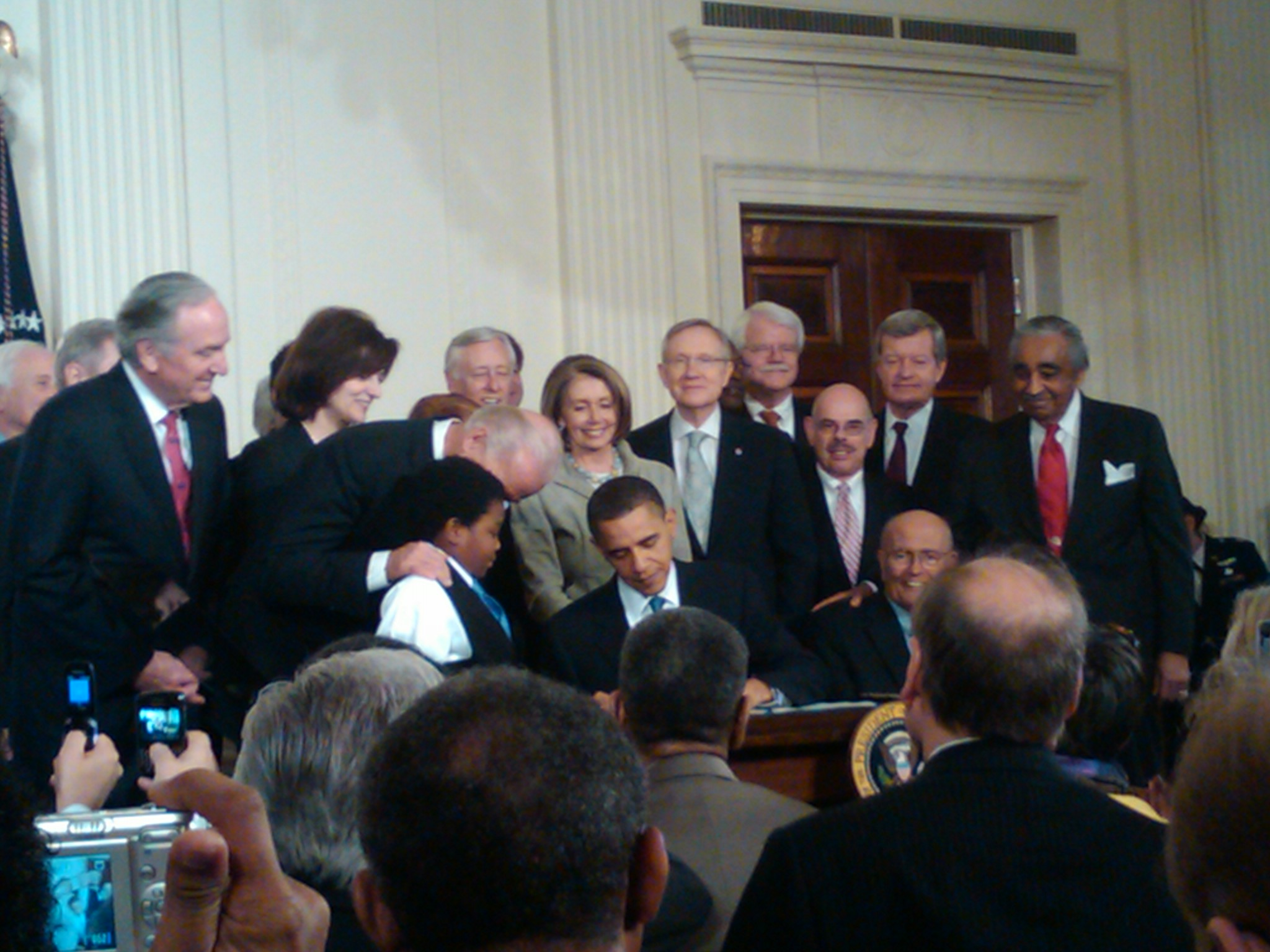
President Obama signing the Affordable Care Act in 2010.

=== Federal legislation ===
In 2010, President Barack Obama signed the Patient Protection and Affordable Care Act (ACA) into law. To match public opinion and boost popularity for the legislation, the ACA contains language that explicitly excludes undocumented immigrants from being able to purchase health insurance coverage. Community health centers and clinics play an integral role in implementing provisions of the ACA and are heavily relied upon by undocumented immigrants. The ACA does provide additional funding for these "safety-net" services, but many physicians are expected to leave these clinics as a result of the higher demand for doctors working with the increased number of insured persons. The Gruber MicroSimulation Model estimates that the rise in uninsurance rates of undocumented immigrants will be negligible nationwide with higher coverage rates for the rest of the population under the ACA. At a state level, the impacts of the ACA will vary depending on the percentage of uninsured undocumented immigrants among their statewide population. The ACA was modeled after a 2006 Massachusetts health care reform but the state's intention to provide health care for undocumented immigrants was not met in the federal legislation. The Massachusetts Health Safety Net (HSN) program was established to provide health coverage with no premiums and low co-pays to low-income individuals regardless of immigration status. After the ACA took effect in 2014, the state lowered HSN funding from hospital revenue tax as a result of the reduction in uninsured persons.

The Personal Responsibility and Work Opportunity Reconciliation Act (PRWORA) and the Illegal Immigration Reform and Immigrant Responsibility Act (IIRIRA) of 1996 redefined the social membership of immigrants by restricting their access to social services, representing a federal shift in immigration policy. PRWORA draws a distinction between benefits—most significantly Temporary Assistance to Needy Families (TANF), food stamps, and Medicaid—accessible to citizens, but not to noncitizens, including lawfully present immigrants. Moreover, while undocumented immigrants have never been eligible for these benefits, these laws result in even greater barriers to access in the form of higher financial burdens placed on states which want to offer substitute programs, and stricter federal enforcement and outlining of restrictions. For example, IIRIRA mandates a legally binding "affidavit of support" where state or local governments may sue the sponsors or petitioners of immigrants for the value of the public benefits or services acquired while ineligible. Such provisions also place greater strains on relatives in "mixed status" households who may wish to help undocumented immigrant members of their family or extended family.

=== State-Level Programs ===
In response to federal restrictions, several states have implemented their own healthcare programs to provide medical insurance to undocumented immigrants. As of April 2025, fourteen states and the District of Columbia provide comprehensive, state-funded health insurance for all income-eligible children, regardless of immigration status.

Two states—including New Jersey—provide state-funded health insurance to income-eligible pregnant individuals, regardless of immigration status.

As of April 2025, seven states and the District of Columbia offer fully state-funded health coverage to income-eligible adults regardless of immigration status.

However, the 2025 administration enacted several executive orders cutting federal support for state-administered public benefits. As a result, states including California, Illinois, and Minnesota have rolled back coverage for undocumented immigrants by freezing enrollment, raising premiums, or capping program participation.

In July 2025, Congress passed the "Big Beautiful Bill," which penalizes states offering public insurance to undocumented immigrants by reducing the federal Medicaid matching funds from 90% to 80%. The law also further restricts ACA and Medicaid eligibility to lawful permanent residents, immigrants from Haiti and Cuba, and immigrants from specific Pacific Island nations.

=== International perspective ===
Other foreign countries are also wrestling with questions related to the access of undocumented immigrants to national healthcare services and insurance programs. In particular, physicians who are often the point of contact in providing care have become increasingly vocal in these discussions. In Europe, pediatricians have been advocating for the extension of the UN convention to immigrants, refugees, and "paperless" children. Swedish pediatricians have openly opposed statewide policies excluding asylum-seeking children from gaining access to medical care and worked to create an alternative state-funded health program for these children in particular. Since 2000, Sweden has allowed asylum-seeking children the same access to medical care as Swedish citizens.

The Videla Law of 1981 barred immigrants lacking documentation from receiving health care in Argentina. In 2004, new legislation reversed this policy and stated that all immigrants should have the same access to health as Argentinian nationals. This includes free emergency care for all undocumented immigrants and free non-emergency care for those who are pregnant women or children. In practice, barriers to healthcare remain for undocumented immigrants. Individual provinces and providers have interpreted the law differently, and many require that patients provide official identification.

Single-payer healthcare has recently entered the debate in the United States, most notably as part of the platform of 2016 presidential candidate Bernie Sanders. Sanders' plan was estimated to allocate $77 billion to health services for undocumented immigrants. Israel's universal single-payer healthcare system allows full access to health services for undocumented immigrants, but a 2014 report notes that there remain heavy discrepancies in healthcare utilization across socioeconomic strata.

A 2012 study was conducted on the 27 members of the European Union about the extent of rights that undocumented immigrants have to healthcare in those countries. The range of healthcare rights differed widely from country to country, but could be broken down into three major groups. In ten countries, they offered less than minimal care, including emergency care (Finland, Ireland, Sweden, Austria, Bulgaria, Czech Republic, Latvia, Luxembourg, Malta, and Romania). In twelve countries, undocumented immigrants received minimal care, including emergency care (Germany, Hungary, Cyprus, Estonia, Denmark, Lithuania, United Kingdom, Poland, Slovak Republic, Slovenia, Belgium and Greece). In five countries, undocumented immigrants had more than minimal rights, including primary and secondary care (Italy, Netherlands, Portugal, Spain and France). The study also found that most member states did not meet the human rights standards in terms of health care.

== See also ==
- Healthy Way LA
- My Health LA
- Immigrant health care in the United States
