= NYC Care =

NYC healthcare program

NYC Care is a health care access program launched in 2019 by New York City, with the stated goal of providing "universal health care" in the city. As of fiscal year 2021, enrollment had increased to 69,000 people; in fiscal year 2022, enrollment passed 100,000 people. To be eligible for the program, a person must not qualify for any insurance on the government's guidelines, and not qualify for any available state insurance. Prior to April 20, 2022, members were required to have been living in New York City for more than six months, but the requirement was eliminated. The program provides no-cost or low-cost medical services at any hospitals or clinics run by NYC Health + Hospitals. The cost to patients of medical services depends on the member's income and family size. NYC Care has no membership fees, monthly fees, or premiums, and it seeks to ensure that all newly enrolled members meet with a primary care doctor within two weeks. Members may also be screened for depression and other mental health issues.

The program grants its members a membership card, a primary care doctor, 24-hour customer service line, and discounts on medications. NYC Care does not pay for ambulance services, long-term care (including skilled nursing), or cosmetic surgery. It also does not offer medical services its members may need while outside of New York City.

== History ==
Modeled after San Francisco's Healthy San Francisco initiative, and overseen by former Healthy San Francisco CEO Mitchell Katz, the plan was designed to provide access to care to the city's uninsured residents, including undocumented immigrants. Prior to the creation of NYC Care, public hospitals in New York provided 52% of the state's uncompensated medical care, yet only received 15% of the state's charity care dollars. In 2016, then-Mayor de Blasio had to reallocate hundreds of millions from the city budget into the public hospital network to remain solvent. In 2017, amid a spat between the city and state over federal funding for the hospital network, its interim head said Health + Hospital had just 18 days' worth of cash on hand.

De Blasio's Republican 2017 mayoral opponent Nicole Malliotokis criticized the mayor's proposal for NYC Care, saying "Our citizens have a hard enough time covering their own health care costs and now Mayor de Blasio also wants them to pay for the healthcare of 300,000 citizens of other countries. The mayor must stop abusing the middle class and treating us like his personal ATM". However, arguing for the creation of NYC Care, Mayor de Blasio said that since uninsured people were already guaranteed health care at the city's public hospitals, the new program would allow them to maintain their health and catch diseases in their early stages, thus preventing costly emergency room visits.

Originally launched in the Bronx in August 2019, NYC Care expanded its coverage to all of NYC's boroughs by September 2020. As part of the NYC Care program, New York City's government is providing $100 million annually to NYC Health + Hospitals to hire more primary care physicians and cover the cost of treating patients, in addition to funding for its outreach campaign.
