= Hotel Mark Twain =

Hotel in Hollywood, Los Angeles, California

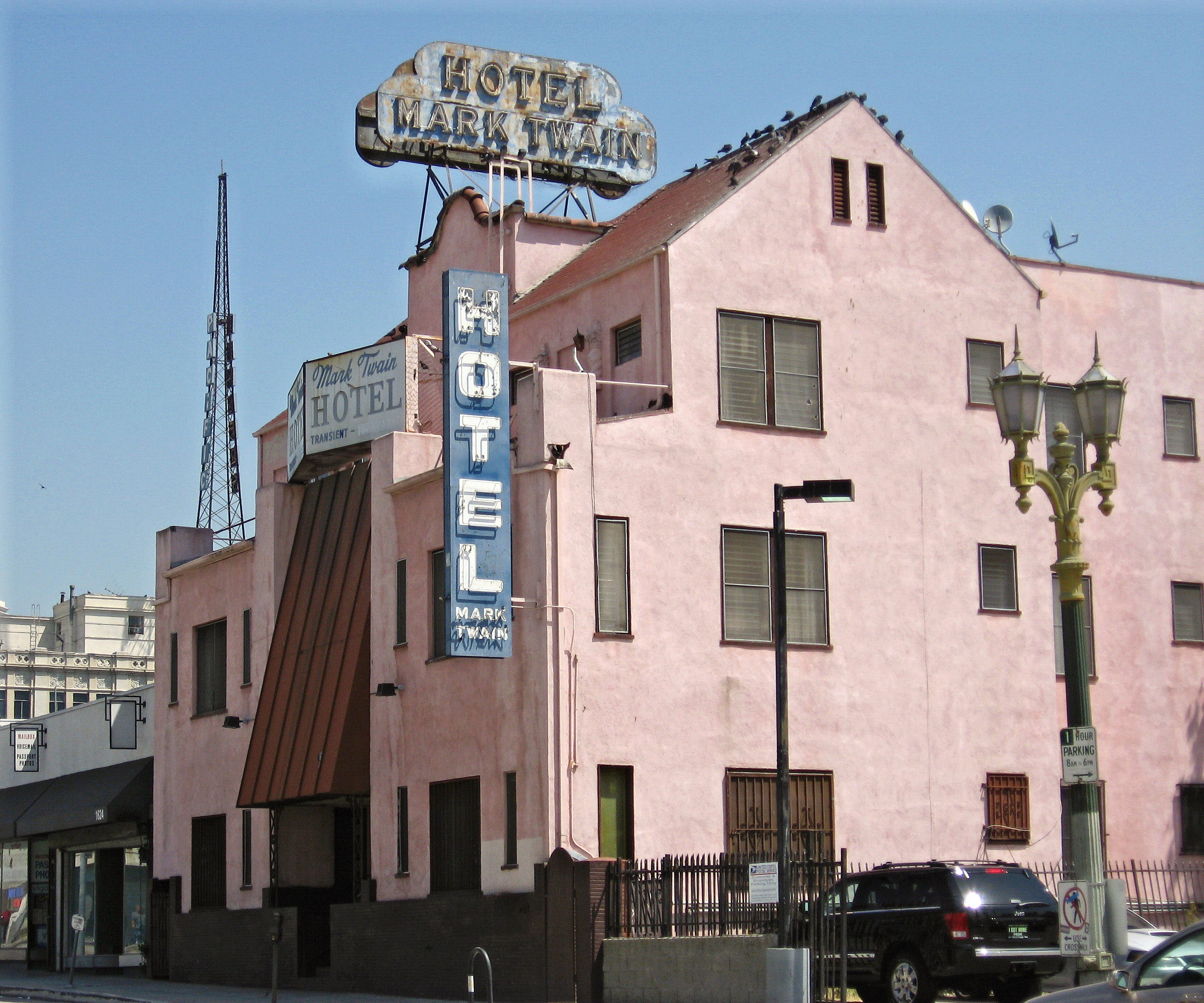
- The building in 2008

- Location within the Los Angeles metropolitan area

General information
- Location: 1622 N. Wilcox Avenue, Hollywood, California, US
- Coordinates: 34.1005°N 118.3306°W
- Completed: 1923
- Opening: 1924

Technical details
- Floor count: 3

Other information
- Number of rooms: 62

Website
- https://www.apaitssg.org/

Hotel Mark Twain, also known as Mark Twain Hotel, is a historic hotel located at 1622 N. Wilcox Avenue in Hollywood, California, United States. The Los Angeles County Department of Mental Health was using the building as an interim housing site as of 2023.

== History ==
Hotel Mark Twain was built in 1923 and opened the following year. The hotel had three owners in its first three years and four in its first seven; even so, it continued to operate as an affordable single room occupancy hotel. It was regarded as "somewhat of a flophouse" by the early 1930s.

Hawkins Way Capital announced plans to upgrade the hotel to a boutique inn in 2016. John Kaliski Architects was in charge of the renovations.

The property was leased to the Musicians Institute for use as a student dormitory as of 2021 and the Los Angeles County Department of Mental Health was using the building as an interim housing site as of 2023.

== Notable visitors and guests ==
Hotel Mark Twain was included to the Green Book, a guidebook used by African American motorists, between 1949 and 1961. Its guests included Marie Saltus, who lived here while working on the biography of her husband, Edgar Saltus, and Joe Barbera, who compared the hotel to a prison.

In his book Call it Experience: The Years of Learning how to Write, author Erskine Caldwell recalls being denied a room in this hotel because he was a writer.

== Architecture and design ==
Hotel Mark Twain is three stories in height and features a Spanish Colonial Revival design with a smooth stucco exterior and a flat built-up composition roof. The building's primary elevation faces west and was constructed flush with the sidewalk line, while its secondary north and south elevations do not feature any decorative elements. The building also features a rooftop sign that has been described as iconic.

The building's interior features 62 units, a shared kitchen, laundry facilities, and a lobby with office space and a vending area.

== In popular culture ==
Harry Bosch stayed in this hotel in the novel The Overlook.
