= Mitchell H. Katz =

Physician and civil servant

President and CEO of New York City Health and Hospitals
- Incumbent
- Assumed office September 25, 2017
- Mayor: Bill de Blasio; Eric Adams; Zohran Mamdani
- Preceded by: Ramanathan Raju

Director of the Los Angeles County Health Agency
- In office November 24, 2015 – September 25, 2017

Director of the Los Angeles County Department of Health Services
- In office January 3, 2011 – November 24, 2015

Director of the San Francisco Department of Public Health
- In office 1997–2010
- Preceded by: Sandra Hernandez
- Succeeded by: Barbara A. Garcia

Personal details
- Born: Mitchell Howard Katz; December 29, 1959 (age 66) Brooklyn, New York, U.S.
- Domestic partner: Igael Gurin-Malous
- Children: Maxwell and Roxie
- Education: Yale University (BA); Harvard Medical School (MD)
- Occupation: Physician and civil servant

Mitchell H. Katz (born December 29, 1959), also known as Mitch Katz, is the president and CEO of New York City Health and Hospitals, the largest public health care system in the United States.

== Early life and education ==
Katz was raised in Brooklyn, New York, the third eldest of four children. He has a brother and sister who are developmentally disabled.

Katz received a Bachelor of Arts degree in psychology at Yale University and received a medical degree at Harvard Medical School. In 1989, he completed his residency in internal medicine at University of California, San Francisco.

== Career ==
After his residency, Katz remained in San Francisco. In 1991, he joined the San Francisco Department of Public Health (SFDPH), serving as chief of research and director of the AIDS Office, director of the Emergency Medical Services Agency and director of the department's health and safety branch.

From 1997 to 2010, Katz served as the director of health and health officer for the San Francisco Department of Public Health, where he implemented the Healthy San Francisco program, which is the United States' first municipal universal health care system.

During his tenure, Katz also served as a medicine, epidemiology and biostatistics professor at the University of California, San Francisco, while operating an outpatient practice at San Francisco General Hospital's Positive Healthcare Practice.

In 2010, Katz was recruited by the Los Angeles County Chief Executive Officer William T Fujioka to lead the Los Angeles County Department of Health Services.

In 2012, Katz was awarded the National Center for Healthcare Leadership's Gail L. Warden Leadership Excellence Award for his contributions to the health care field.

On November 24, 2015, the Los Angeles County Board of Supervisors appointed Katz as the director of the Los Angeles County Health Agency.

Mitchell Katz is deputy editor of the scientific journal JAMA Internal Medicine.

== Personal life ==
Katz and his partner, Rabbi Igael Gurin-Malous have two children, Maxwell and Roxie. Maxwell and Roxie were adopted from an orphanage in Vietnam.
