= Hollywood Citizen-News Building =

Historic commercial building in Hollywood, California. U.S.

General information
- Type: Commercial
- Architectural style: Art Deco
- Location: 1545-1551 North Wilcox Avenue, Hollywood, Los Angeles, California, U.S.
- Coordinates: 34°05′59″N 118°19′52″W
- Completed: 1931
- Renovated: 2006

Technical details
- Floor count: 2
- Floor area: 49,000 square feet (4,600 m^{2})

Design and construction
- Architect: Francis D. Rutherford

Los Angeles Historic-Cultural Monument
- Designated: December 5, 2018
- Reference no.: 1173

Hollywood Citizen-News Building is a historic two-story commercial building located at 1545-1551 North Wilcox Avenue in Hollywood, California. It housed Hollywood Citizen-News from 1931 to 1970 and was declared Los Angeles Historic-Cultural Monument No. 1173 in 2018.

== History ==
Hollywood Citizen-News Building was designed by Francis D. Rutherford for Ira C. Copley, owner of Hollywood News. Construction began in October 1930 and was completed on July 1, 1931, at which point the newspaper moved into the building. Copley sold the building and newspaper to Harlan G. Palmer later that year, after which Palmer merged the newspaper with his own Hollywood Citizen, creating the Hollywood Citizen-News.

Hollywood Citizen-News and the Hollywood Citizen-News Building were owned by Palmer until his death in 1956, at which point Palmer's son Harlan Palmer Jr. assumed ownership. In 1961, Palmer Jr. sold the newspaper and building to David Heyler, who in turn sold them to Lammot du Pont Copeland Jr. in 1964. Copeland Jr. filed for bankruptcy in 1970, at which point the building was seized by the Internal Revenue Service and the newspaper ceased to exist.

The building was renovated in 2006. In 2014, it was sold by Brentwood Capital Partners to S. E. Edinger for $14.5 million ($19.7 million in 2025); the building was 94% occupied at the time. Relevant Group, owners of both properties that abut this building, bought it from Edinger three years later.

The building was declared Los Angeles Historic-Cultural Monument No. 1173 on December 5, 2018.

== Architecture and design ==
Hollywood Citizen-News Building is rectangular in plan, two stories tall, and made of concrete with a steel frame. The building features an Art Deco design, its primary Art Deco elements including smooth cement plaster wall cladding, a flat roof with a parapet, metal-frame fixed windows, glazed terra cotta tiles, decorative geometric motifs, and an emphasis on verticality.

The building's front facade faces east and is clad in cement plaster with a continuous granite veneer base. The facade is symmetric and consists of thirteen bays framed by fluted piers, each pier supporting a flat frieze that contains fretwork terra cotta panels, the friezes topped by a continuous decorative cornice. Both outside bays feature open vehicle portals that lead to covered driveways on the ground floor. Ground floor fenestration is primarily fixed, metal-framed picture windows with multi-lite transoms and geometrically patterned transom bars, while second story fenestration consists of multi-lite, metal-sash awnings and fixed windows with projecting plaster sills. All of the windows are recessed, and the roof also contains skylights.

The building's primary entrance is centered in the facade's center bay and features two glazed, metal doors framed by a projection clad in glazed terra cotta tile. Above the entrance, the projection also features a tile mural depicting a Gutenberg press and roller press. The terra cotta panel in the fireze above the entrance reads "Hollywood News Bldg" and an additional neon blade sign that reads “Citizen News” is mounted on the wall immediately north of the entrance bay. The building's non-front facing elevations are asymmetrical and utilitarian in design.

The building contains 49,000 square feet (4,600 m^{2}) of floor area. The lobby features a granite base, glazed tile flooring, a coffered wood and plaster ceiling, and a stair that is tiled and topped by metal balustrade. Other interior elements include pendant lights and decorative cast metal.

The building has undergone numerous alterations since its construction, including: ground floor flooring replaced in 1936, first-floor mezzanine added in 1947, parapet modified in 1957, second-floor mezzanine added in 2006, exterior roll-up doors replaced with a glass system in 2007, and some of the building's openings were infilled at an unknown date.
