= Los Angeles County Department of Health Services =

Municipal health system in Los Angeles County, California, US

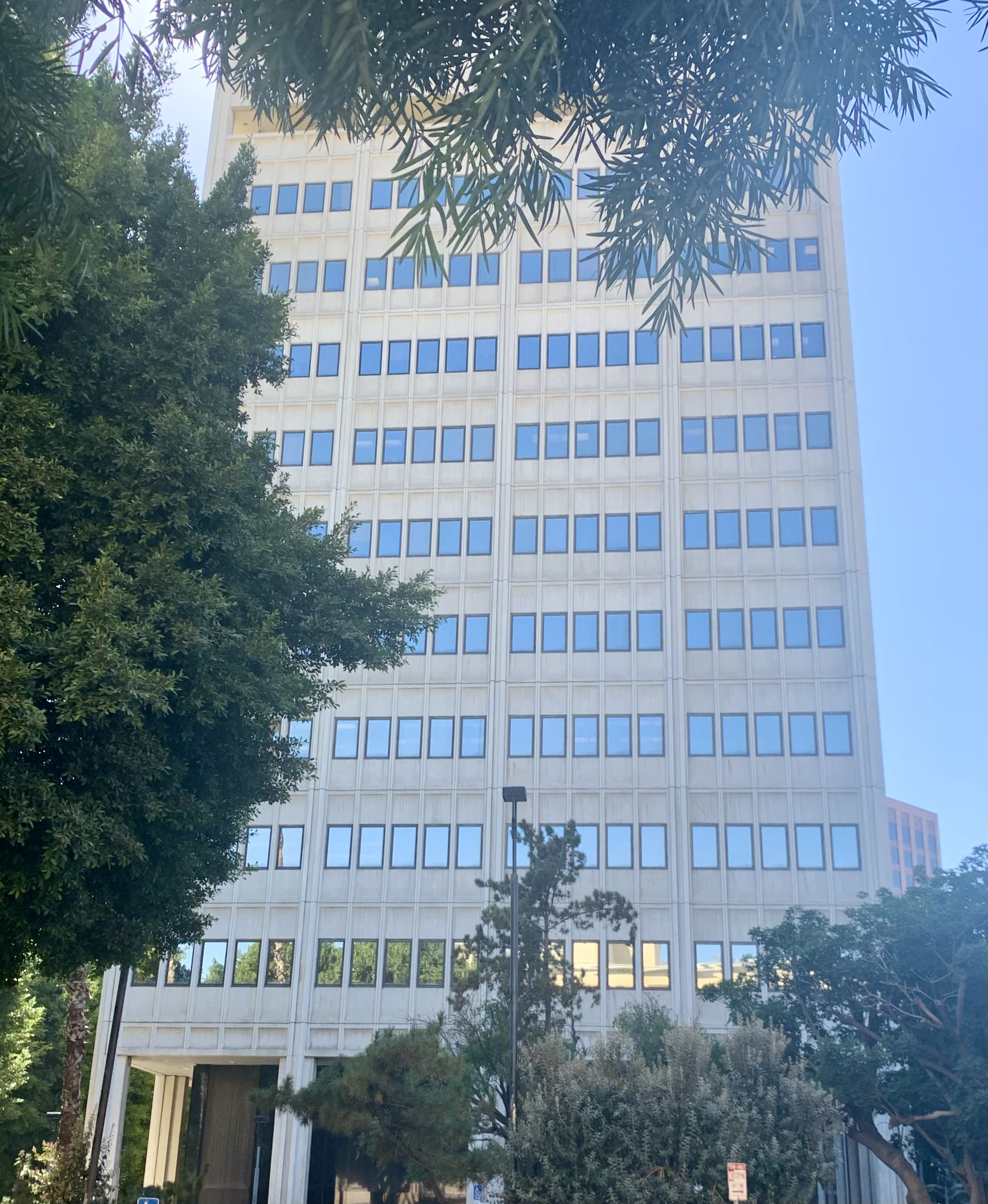
- DHS' administrative headquarters in Downtown Los Angeles

Agency overview
- Formed: 1972; 54 years ago
- Preceding agency: Los Angeles County Health Department
- Jurisdiction: Los Angeles County
- Headquarters: 313 N. Figueroa Street, Los Angeles, California; 34.0599°N 118.25°W
- Employees: 22,085 (2016)
- Annual budget: US$4,215,331,000 (2016)
- Agency executives: Dr. Christina Ghaly, MD, Medical Officer; Dr. Aries Limbaga, DNP, MBA, Deputy Director; Dr. Sylvia Martin, DNP, RN, NEA-BC, System Chief Nursing Officer
- Child agencies: LAC+USC Medical Center; Harbor–UCLA Medical Center; Olive View–UCLA Medical Center; Rancho Los Amigos National Rehabilitation Center; High Desert Regional Health Center; Martin Luther King, Jr. Outpatient Center
- Website: dhs.lacounty.gov

Health Services Los Angeles County, officially the Los Angeles County Department of Health Services, operates the public hospitals and clinics in Los Angeles County and is the United States' second largest municipal health system, after NYC Health + Hospitals.

The department (sometimes abbreviated as DHS or LADHS) operates an extensive healthcare network made up of Los Angeles General Medical Center, Harbor–UCLA Medical Center, Olive View–UCLA Medical Center, Rancho Los Amigos National Rehabilitation Center, and numerous outpatient clinics, including two ambulatory care centers and 16 local health clinics. Health Services ran the free health care programs Healthy Way LA and My Health LA from 2007 until 2024, when eligibility and access to California's health care program, Medi-Cal, was expanded. In Fiscal Year 2015–16, Health Services provided healthcare services to over 643,856 unique patients during 2,457,174 patient visits. For Fiscal Year 2015–16, Health Services had an annual budget of US$3,832,724,000. The County funds less than 15% (US$635,492,000) of Health Services' total annual budget.

The department's administrative headquarters is located in Downtown Los Angeles's Civic Center, at the corner of Figueroa and Temple Streets. The department works with the County's two other health departments, the Los Angeles County Department of Mental Health and the Los Angeles County Department of Public Health, in a cooperative healthcare integration effort.

== History ==
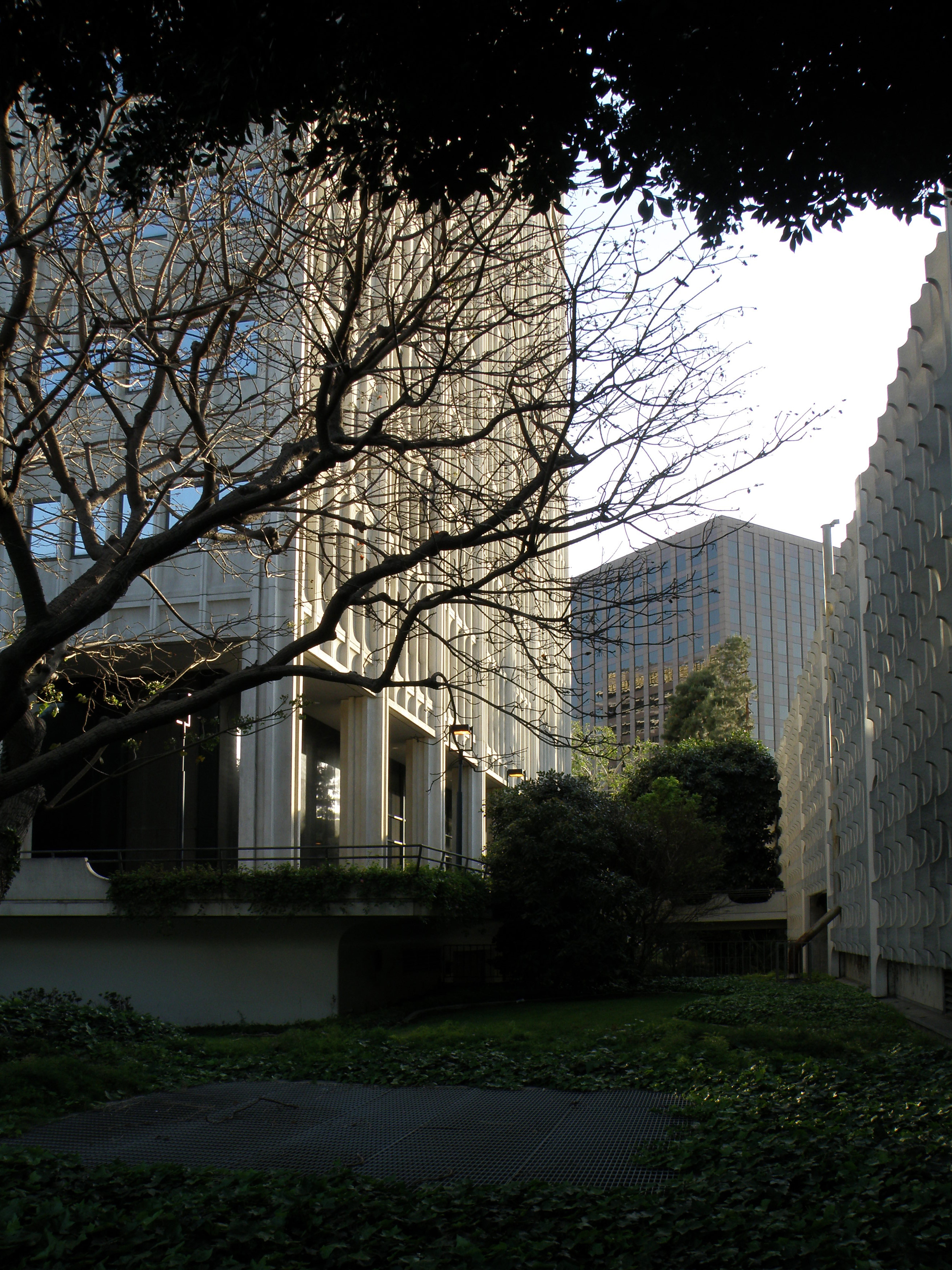
The administration building in 2009.

Municipal governments, under Section 17000 of California's Welfare and Institutions Code, are responsible as safety net health care providers. In the 1860s, Los Angeles County appointed a County Physician, and a small hospital for the poor in Los Angeles was established. The Department of Charities was formed in 1913 and included five Divisions: County Hospital, County Farm, Outdoor Relief, Olive View Sanatorium, and Cemetery Divisions. The wide range of responsibilities of the Department of Charities eventually proved unwieldy, and in 1966 the department was split into the Departments of Hospitals and Public Social Services. Several institutions were acquired or established, including Rancho Los Amigos Poor Farm (now Rancho Los Amigos National Rehabilitation Center) in 1890, the General Hospital (now LAC+USC Medical Center) in 1932, two military hospitals, including the Harbor General Hospital (now Harbor–UCLA Medical Center, after World War II, Olive View Sanatorium (now Olive View–UCLA Medical Center) in 1970, and the Martin Luther King Medical Center (now Martin Luther King, Jr. Outpatient Center) in 1972, in response to the Watts Riots

In the 1960s, the Los Angeles City Health Department merged into the county's Department of Health. In 1972, the Los Angeles County Departments of Hospitals and Health, along with the Los Angeles County Veterinarian's Office, were merged into the Department of Health Services, to consolidate and integrate health services.

On May 30, 2006, the Los Angeles County Board of Supervisors tentatively approved the establishment of Los Angeles County Department of Public Health (DPH) as a separate department, primarily to buffer DPH from DHS' recurring budget shortfalls and to separate public health functions, including enforcement of laws, from DHS. DPH was formally established on July 7, 2006. The department was formally separated on July 6, 2006.

On January 3, 2011, Mitchell H. Katz, a physician, was appointed Director of Health Services for DHS. Katz served 13 years as director of public health for the San Francisco Department of Public Health, where he designed and implemented the "Healthy San Francisco" program covering all San Franciscans with health care. From 2008 to 2011, John F. Schunhoff, Ph.D. served as an interim director following Bruce Chernoff's resignation in May 2008.

In 2011, DHS began enrolling hundreds of thousands of uninsured LA County residents in a publicly funded health program called Healthy Way LA (HWLA) and began a major overhaul of its health care system to increase emphasis on primary care instead of acute care. These reforms are set to take place before the Patient Protection and Affordable Care Act takes effect in 2014. Healthy Way L.A. provides a primary care provider team to members and expanded access to primary, preventative and specialty services, as well as access to hospital-based inpatient and outpatient services. It is a county implementation of the state Low Income Health Program (LIHP). In the 2010-2011 fiscal year, DHS reported a budget surplus of $13.2 million.

== Facilities ==
LADHS comprises a network of medical facilities throughout Los Angeles County, including four hospitals, two ambulatory care centers, six Comprehensive Health Centers (CHC), and 10 Health Centers (HC). DHS' Ambulatory Care Network, which was created to provide primary care, outpatient specialty care, and ambulatory surgery, consists of DHS outpatient clinics (Multi-Service Ambulatory Care Centers, Comprehensive Health Centers, and Health Centers).

=== Medical Centers ===
LADHS operates three academic teaching hospitals and one rehabilitation hospital:

1. Harbor–UCLA Medical Center (H-UCLA MC)
2. Los Angeles General Medical Center (LAC+USC MC)
3. Olive View–UCLA Medical Center (OV-UCLA MC)
4. Rancho Los Amigos National Rehabilitation Center (RLANRC)

Harbor-UCLA Medical Center, Los Angeles General Medical Center, and Olive View-UCLA Medical Center each provides inpatient, outpatient, and emergency services for men, women, and children. The Rancho Los Amigos National Rehabilitation Center provides physical therapy services to individuals around the country.

=== Outpatient Care Centers ===
LADHS, through its Ambulatory Care Network (ACN), operates two outpatient care centers, which comprise an urgent care center as well as primary care and specialty care clinics:

1. High Desert Regional Health Center (HD RHC)
2. Martin Luther King, Jr. Outpatient Center (MLK OC)

=== Comprehensive Health Centers and Health Centers ===
LADHS' Ambulatory Care Network operates a network of comprehensive health centers and health centers, which are community-based clinics that provide primary care to patients at their medical homes, throughout the county.

These include six comprehensive health centers (CHCs):

1. Long Beach Comprehensive Health Center
2. Edward R. Roybal Comprehensive Health Center
3. El Monte Comprehensive Health Center
4. H. Claude Hudson Comprehensive Health Center
5. Hubert H. Humphrey Comprehensive Health Center
6. Mid-Valley Comprehensive Health Center

LADHS also operates 16 health centers (HCs):

1. Antelope Valley Health Center
2. Bell Health Center
3. Bellflower Health Center
4. Curtis R. Tucker Health Center
5. Dollarhide Health Center
6. East Los Angeles Health Center
7. Glendale Health Center
8. Lake Los Angeles Community Clinic
9. La Puente Health Center
10. Little Rock Community Clinic
11. Northeast Health Center
12. San Fernando Health Center
13. South Valley Health Center
14. Torrance Health Center
15. West Valley Health Center
16. Wilmington Health Center

== Governance ==
The Los Angeles County Board of Supervisors oversees the Department of Health Services. Christina Ghaly, M.D., leads DHS as the Director of Health Service and reports to the LA County Board of Supervisors.

DHS leadership also includes: Hal F. Yee Jr., M.D., Chief Deputy Director of Clinical Affairs; Nina J. Park, M.D., Chief Deputy Director of Population Health; Clemens Hong, M.D., Director of Community Programs; Shari Doi, Director of Patient Access; Allan Wecker, Chief Financial Officer; Kevin Lynch, Chief Information Officer; and Elizabeth Jacobi, Administrative Deputy

== Quality of Care ==
=== Rankings ===
Two hospitals in the DHS system, Harbor-UCLA Medical Center and the Rancho Los Amigos National Rehabilitation Center, were ranked "best" in the 2012-13 rankings of U.S. News & World Report's America's Best Hospitals:

- Harbor-UCLA Medical Center was ranked #26 in the Los Angeles metropolitan area and #45 in California. The hospital's nephrology program was also ranked "high-performing".
- Rancho Los Amigos National Rehabilitation Center was ranked #26 in the Los Angeles metropolitan area and #45 in California. The hospital's rehabilitation program was also ranked "high-performing."

Rancho Los Amigos National Rehabilitation Center has consistently been ranked as one of "America's Best Hospitals" since 1989.

=== Accreditation ===
All four hospitals in the DHS system are currently accredited by the Joint Commission:

1. Harbor–UCLA Medical Center (H-UCLA MC)
2. Los Angeles General Medical Center (LAC+USC MC)
3. Olive View–UCLA Medical Center (OV-UCLA MC)
4. Rancho Los Amigos National Rehabilitation Center (RLANRC)

Harbor-UCLA Medical Center has consistently received the Joint Commission's Medal of Honor for Organ Donation. Most recently, it received a silver medal in 2012.

== Volume of Services ==
DHS provides health services to over 800,000 patients including many uninsured patients. LAC+USC Medical Center provides care for half of HIV/AIDS and sickle cell anemia patients in Southern California.

In 2012, the DHS system had a hospital bed capacity of 1,465. DHS hospitals had 74,811 admissions, 1,251,553 outpatient visits, and 4,850 births. Over the past 20 years, the number of births performed at DHS hospitals has declined substantially since Medi-Cal expanded coverage for pregnant women in the 1990s.

In Fiscal Year 2011–2012, the DHS system (inclusive of MACCs) received over 300,000 emergency department admissions, over 2.6 million ambulatory care admissions and nearly 230,000 urgent care admissions. DHS hospitals recorded 295,000 emergency department visits, 1.1 million outpatient hospital visits and 76,000 urgent care visits.

Medical Center	Primary Service	Total Beds	Admissions	Outpatient Visits	Births	Personnel	Total Expenses
Los Angeles General Medical Center	Acute care	633	35,636	571,245	2,055	6,050	$1,440,644,952
Harbor–UCLA Medical Center	Acute care	350	22,064	418,435	939	3,199	$675,671,267
Olive View–UCLA Medical Center	Acute care	275	13,913	225,760	1,856	2,218	$499,333,490
Rancho Los Amigos National Rehabilitation Center	Rehabilitation	207	3,198	36,113	0	1,704	$230,674,268

== Healthcare Programs ==
=== Healthy Way LA ===
Healthy Way LA (HWLA) was a free public health care program available to underinsured or uninsured, low-income residents of Los Angeles (LA) County. The program was a Low Income Health Program (LIHP) approved under the 1115 Waiver. HWLA helped narrow the large gap in access to health care among low-income populations by extending health care insurance to uninsured LA County residents living at 0 percent to 133 percent of the Federal Poverty Level (FPL). Individuals eligible for HWLA are assigned to a medical home within the LA County Department of Health Services (LADHS) or its partners, thus gaining access to continuous primary care, preventive and specialty services, mental health services, and other support systems. HWLA was one of the few sources of coordinated health care for disadvantaged adults without dependents in LA County.

As a part of the Affordable Care Act, Medicaid Expansion will phase out the Healthy Way LA program. As a result, 252,379 Healthy Way LA members will automatically be transitioned into Medi-Cal on January 1, 2014.

=== Community Partner Program ===
The Community Partners Program is a collaboration between the LADHS and private, community-based providers (Partners) to provide quality health services in a culturally and linguistically appropriate environment to low income and uninsured communities. This program is part of a Medicaid Demonstration Project designed to provide LADHS with federal fiscal relief to preserve vital community clinic capacity, to increase access to primary, dental, and specialty care services, and to develop Community Partners for the provision of these services. The Community Partner Program provides Primary, specialty, and dental care services are available to people of all ages who reside in Los Angeles County and whose net family income is at or below 133-1/3% of the Federal Poverty Level (or are General Relief (GR) Recipients), and who do not qualify for Medi-Cal or any other government or third-party assistance programs. Patients are strongly encouraged to make an appointment at one of the Partner sites to find out if they are eligible for Community Partners or other funded health care services.

=== Housing for Health ===
Housing for Health is a LADHS program that provides chronically homeless patients with housing. A chronically homeless person is defined as a homeless individual with at least one disabling condition that has been continuously homeless for one year or has had at least four episodes of homelessness in the past three years. Housing for Health began enrolling participants on March 1, 2007 and is funded by LA County Homeless Prevention Initiative.

The Housing for Health program reduced emergency room visits by 77%. Inpatient visits were also reduced by 77% and there was an 85% reduction the number of days of these visits. Participants in the Housing for Health program used an average of $32,000 less of DHS acute medical services. DHS will operate a primary care clinic and a supportive housing development lab in the Star Apartments, which is a 100 unit apartment complex in Downtown Los Angeles' Skid Row under construction for the chronically homeless by the Skid Row Housing Trust.

== See also ==
- Los Angeles General Medical Center
- Harbor–UCLA Medical Center
- Olive View–UCLA Medical Center
- Rancho Los Amigos National Rehabilitation Center
- My Health LA
- Healthy Way LA
