= Palmer Building =

Building in Los Angeles, California, U.S.

- U.S. Historic district – Contributing property
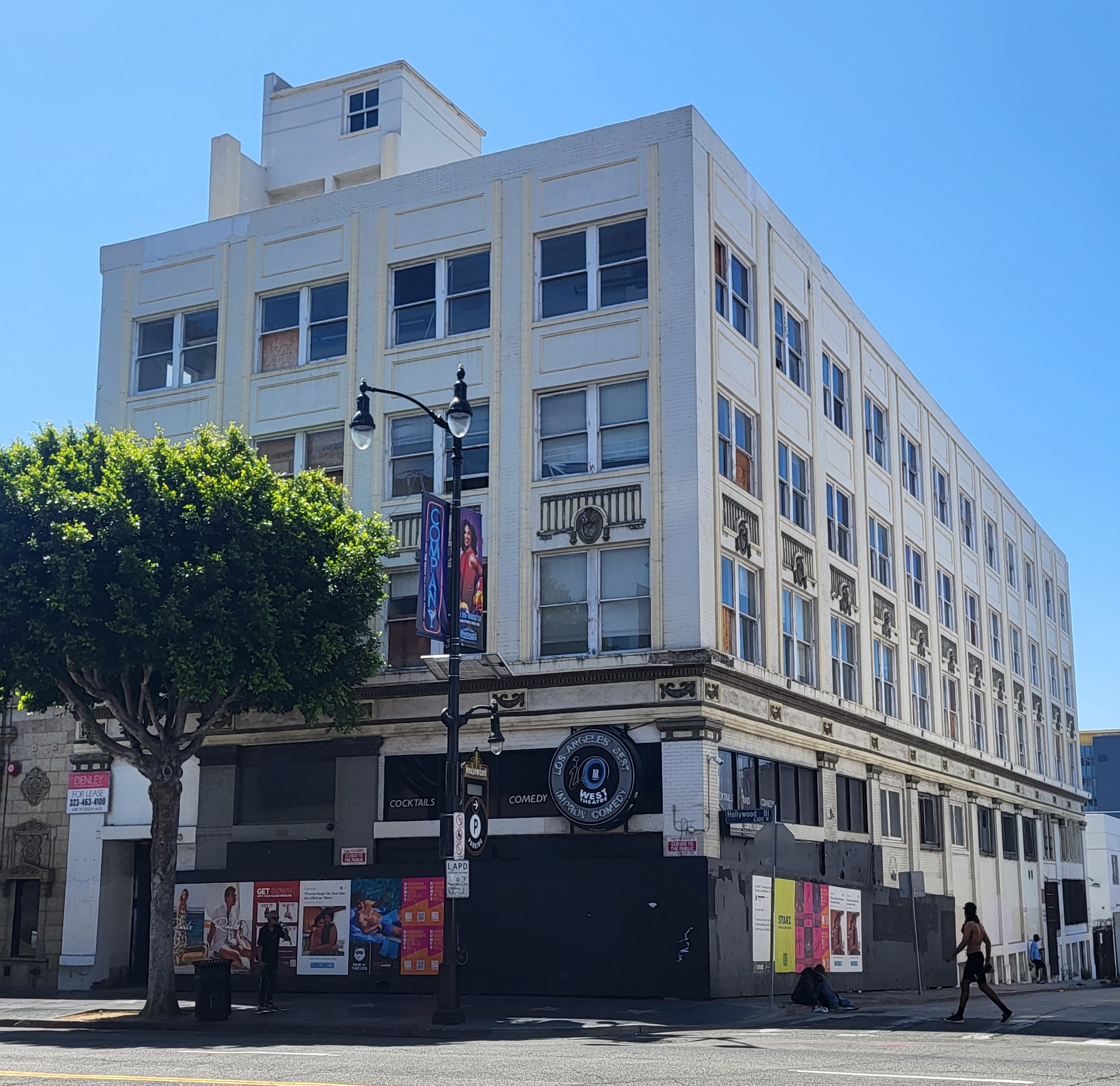
- The building in 2024

- Location within the Los Angeles metropolitan area
- Location: 6360-6366 W. Hollywood Blvd. and 1646 Cosmo St., Hollywood, California
- Coordinates: 34.101°N 118.329°W
- Built: 1922
- Architect: Edward T. Flaherty
- Architectural style: Renaissance Revival
- Part of: Hollywood Boulevard Commercial and Entertainment District (ID85000704)
- Designated CP: April 4, 1985

Palmer Building is a historic four-story building at 6360-6366 W. Hollywood Boulevard and 1646 Cosmo Street in Hollywood, California. It is one of a pair of commercial office structures on its intersection, the other being Palmer Building II.

== History ==
Palmer Building was built in 1921 by Edward T. Flaherty for the Palmer family, creators of the Hollywood Chamber of Commerce and owners of the newspaper Hollywood Citizen. The newspaper moved into the building shortly after the building's completion. In 1940, the Associated Press opened its Los Angeles bureau in this building as well, and the building was also home to the headquarters of Betty Blanc Company and Tailwagger Guide Dog Institute, with Betty Blanc Company also operating a retail store on the ground floor.

In 1985, the Hollywood Boulevard Commercial and Entertainment District was added to the National Register of Historic Places, with Palmer Building listed as a contributing property in the district.

According to Los Angeles's Building and Safety Department, residents started complaining about the state of Palmer Building in 2017. Violations included a failure to comply with orders to seal the building, illegal occupancy, electrical work done without permits, unapproved construction, unapproved partitions in the basement, and unapproved use of the basement as living spaces, music studios, and a barbershop.

In February 2018, Palmer Building tenant iO West closed after twenty years in operation. After, most of the other tenants left the building as well. Throughout the year, multiple police raids evicted non-leased tenants, and in September 2018, a final raid evicted everyone from the building, which was supposed to be vacant but was found to have 66 individuals inside, four or six of whom were minors, all 66 of whom were cited for trespassing and ten of whom were arrested for parole violations or other unrelated crimes. Also in September 2018, the City Attorney's office filed a 25-count criminal case against the owner of the Palmer Building, the charges alleging various building and fire code violations. In response, City Councilman Mitch O'Farrell called the building owner a "stereotypical slumlord."

In 2020, Artist Guild Hotels announced their plan to turn Palmer Building into a ten-story, 87-room hotel, complete with a rooftop pool, terrace decks, and numerous food-and-beverage venues. The plan also included restoring and preserving the building's character defining features, and a seismic retrofit. In 2022, the plans were scaled back to a four-story, 57-room hotel with rooftop dining.

== Architecture ==
Palmer Building was built with concrete, with upper floors that feature Renaissance Revival detailing, including full entablature with architrave and friezes, dentils, spandrels, and shields. The ground floor originally featured bays defined by pilasters with molded capitals, and while the Hollywood Blvd. ground floor facade was removed, the Cosmo St. facade remains.

== Palmer Building II ==
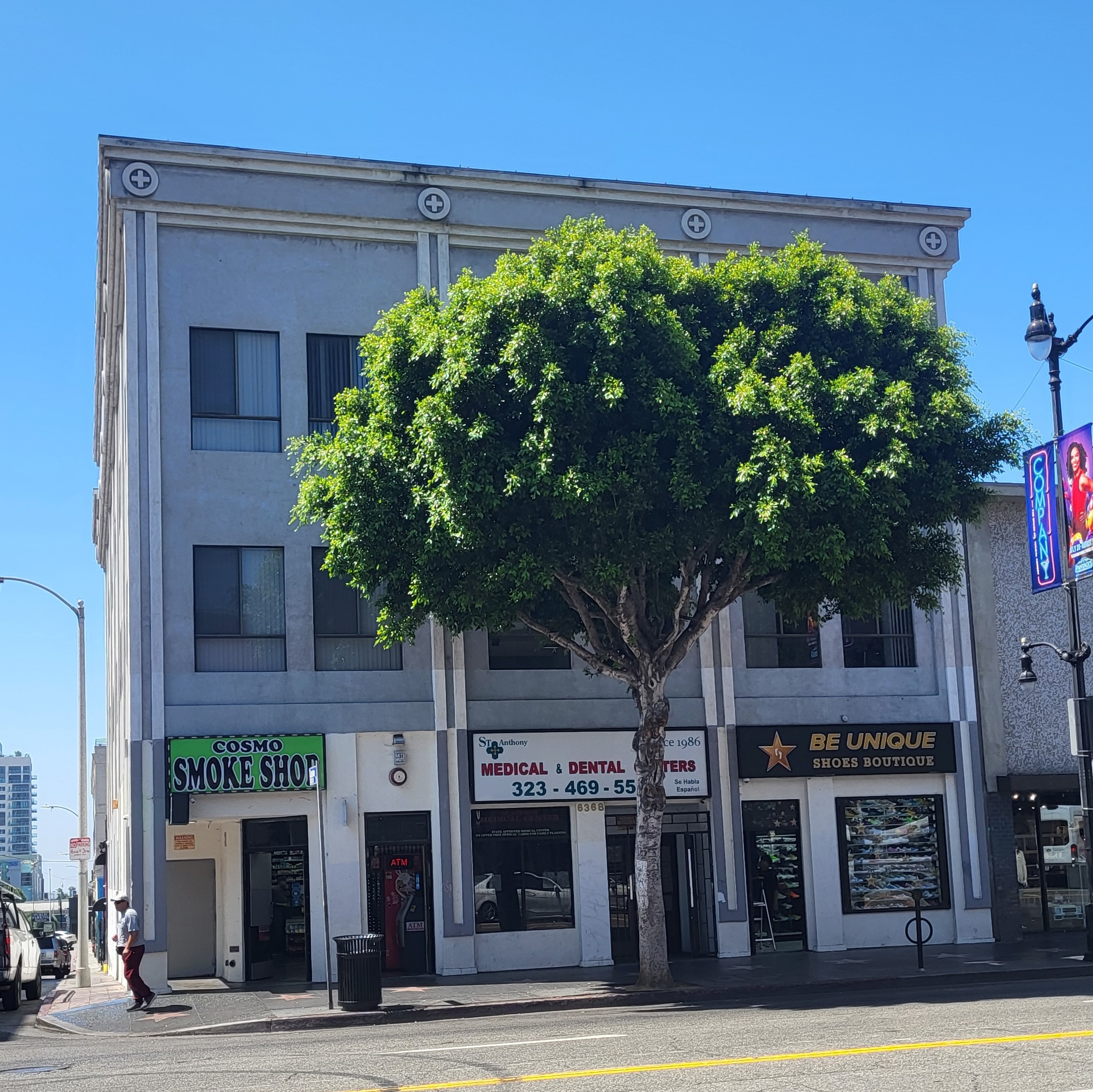
Palmer Building II

Palmer Building II is the second in a pair of office buildings, the first being Palmer Building. The two buildings are located across Cosmo St. from each other, and while Palmer Building was declared a contributing property to the Hollywood Boulevard Commercial and Entertainment District, Palmer Building II was not. This building, built in 1921, is a four-story brick and stucco commercial structure whose primary facade has been stripped of ornament and refaced, and whose fenestration has been changed. Because of this, the building was deemed to not contribute to the character of the district.

== Filming location ==
Palmer Building has been featured in many films, particularly during the silent era, including Cops, Safety Last!, and The Last Edition.

== See also ==
- List of contributing properties in the Hollywood Boulevard Commercial and Entertainment District
