= Mayfair Apartments (Los Angeles) =

Historic apartment complex in Hollywood, California. U.S.

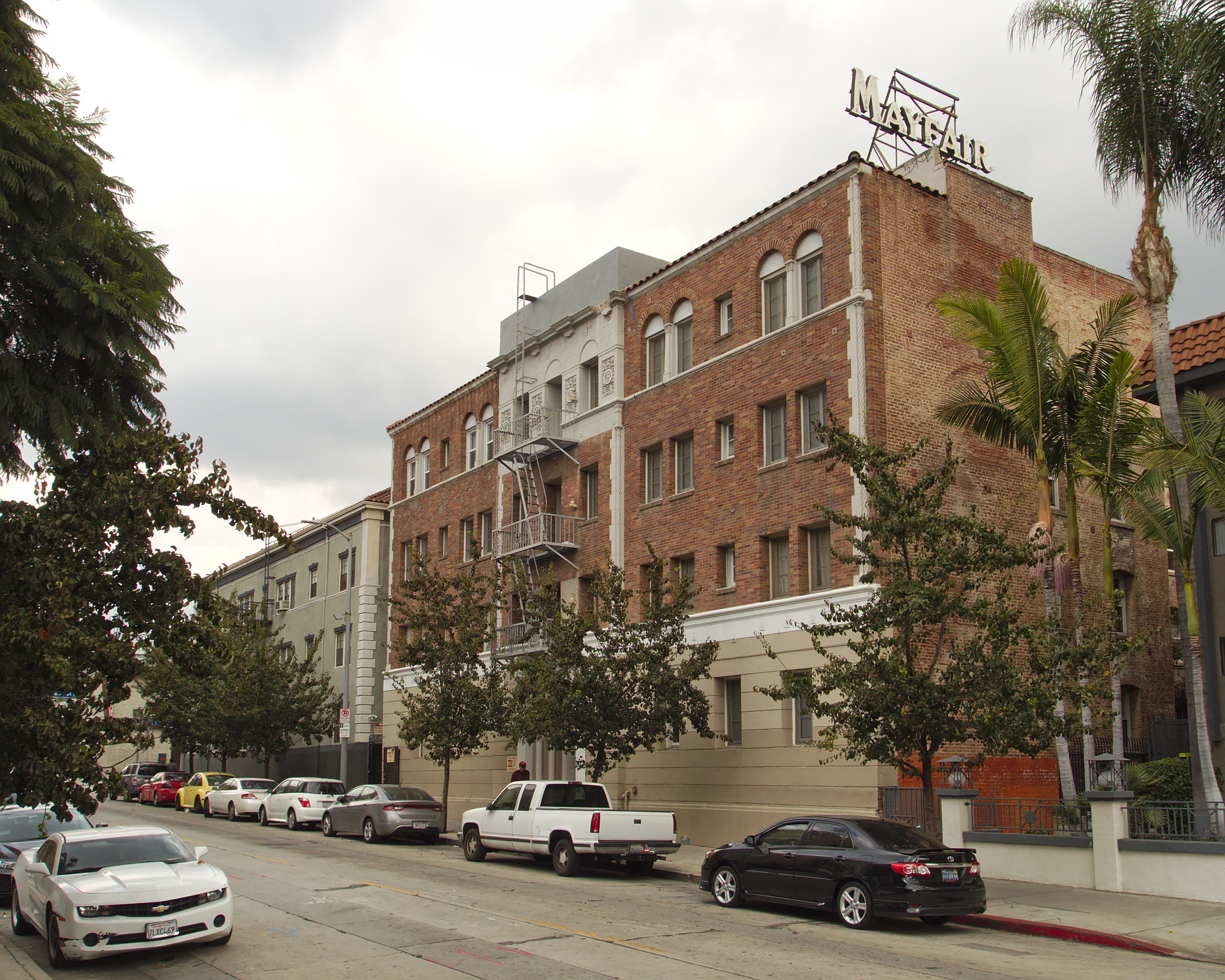
- The building in 2015
- Interactive map of the Mayfair Apartments area

General information
- Type: Apartment building
- Architectural style: Mediterranean Revival
- Location: 1760 North Wilcox Avenue, Hollywood, Los Angeles, California, U.S.
- Coordinates: 34°06′13″N 118°19′51″W
- Completed: 1925

Design and construction
- Architect: William Allen

Los Angeles Historic-Cultural Monument
- Designated: April 27, 2007
- Reference no.: 867

Mayfair Apartments, also known as The Mayfair, is a historic apartment building located at 1760 North Wilcox Avenue in Hollywood, California. It was declared Los Angeles Historic-Cultural Monument No. 867 in 2007.

== History ==
Mayfair Apartments was designed by William Allen and built by the Arthur Bard Company in 1925. The building’s post-construction renovations include: a neon rooftop sign added in 1933, addition of a manager’s office and modification of an adjacent staircase in 1933, alteration of the parapet in 1952, fire code compliance modifications in 1974, roof replaced in 1987, and interior units renovated in 2001.

The building was declared Los Angeles Historic-Cultural Monument No. 867 on April 27, 2007.

== Architecture and design ==
Mayfair Apartments is four stories in height and features a Romanesque Revival/Mediterranean Revival/Renaissance Revival design. It is “I” shaped in plan with courtyards on each side. The building’s interior features a double-loaded corridor on each floor and a lobby on the ground floor.

The building’s façade is rectangular and features two bays that flank a narrow center bay. The façade's base is horizontally oriented and features rusticated scored plaster. The center bay features an arched entry with a parapet with decorative cornice above. The façade also features recessed windows, fourth floor arched and paired windows with decorative columns, additional rectangular windows with projecting brick windowsills, variegated brickwork, an arched and stepped entrance flanked by decorative columns and relief detailing, decorative quoining, patterned panels, and additional spiraled columns. Shed roofs flank the central bay, with flat roofs beyond them.

The building also features a rooftop neon sign displaying the name “Mayfair”.
