= Los Angeles County Health Agency =

Agency overview
- Formed: November 5, 2015; 10 years ago
- Jurisdiction: Los Angeles County
- Employees: 31,887 (2016)
- Annual budget: US$6.942 billion (2016)
- Agency executive: Earl Fred Leaf, Director (2019)
- Child agencies: Los Angeles County Department of Health Services; Los Angeles County Department of Mental Health; Los Angeles County Department of Public Health
- Website: healthagency.lacounty.gov at the Wayback Machine (archived September 16, 2019)

Los Angeles County Alliance for Health Integration
- Formation: February 18, 2020; 6 years ago
- Type: Alliance
- Parent organization: Los Angeles County Department of Health Services; Los Angeles County Department of Mental Health; Los Angeles County Department of Public Health
- Staff: 0 (2023)
- Website: ceo.lacounty.gov/healthcare-integration/

The Los Angeles County Alliance for Health Integration is the term used by Los Angeles County to refer to the ongoing integration efforts of its three health departments. Previously, the Los Angeles County Health Agency (sometimes stylized as Health Agency of Los Angeles) was the title of a Los Angeles County agency composed of the Los Angeles County Department of Health Services, the Los Angeles County Department of Mental Health, and the Los Angeles County Department of Public Health and tasked in 2015 by the Los Angeles County Board of Supervisors with the coordination of all health related activities in the County. These health departments, sometimes collectively referred to as the Health Agency, remain among the United States' largest and the agency was established to coordinate and streamline the county's physical health, behavioral health, and public health care services, programs, and policies under a single integrated system of care.

Beginning in 2020, integration efforts between the departments continued through the newly-formed Alliance for Health Integration. Since March 2023 the AHI office has not been independently staffed although integration efforts of the three health departments remain a Board-Directed Priority and are still referred to as AHI efforts. The continuing AHI reports made to the Board are now delivered by the Department of Health Services.

== Structure ==
The Health Agency was led by Mitchell H. Katz from 2015 to 2017. Fred Leaf began serving as interim director in December 2017 and was appointed director beginning January 22, 2019.

On February 18, 2020, the Los Angeles County Board of Supervisors directed the three health departments to continue integration efforts through the Alliance for Health Integration. The staffing and infrastructure costs of the Alliance were pooled with 50% from the Department of Health Services, 35% from the Department of Mental Health, and 15% from the Department of Public Health with the chair of the Alliance rotating annually between the three health department directors. On March 1, 2023, the seven Alliance for Health Integration staff were transferred to the Department of Mental Health. The Alliance for Health Integration remains the term used by the County for a current Board-Directed Priority directing its three Health Departments to cooperate "on key health integration activities".

== Budget and Employees ==
In FY 2015–16, the three departments comprising the Los Angeles County Health Agency had a combined annual budget of US$6,942,989,000, constituting about 25% of the county's total annual budget. The county's 31,887 health employees were tasked to the County Health Agency.

== History ==
From 1972 to 1978, the Los Angeles County Department of Health (now the Department of Health Services) provided the full continuum of physical, mental and public health services and functions. However, in 1978, the county established the Department of Mental Health to provide behavioral health services, amid concerns that funding for mental health services was being diverted to the county's hospitals. In 2006, the Department of Public Health was separated from the Department of Health Services, during a major budget deficit.

On January 13, 2015, the Los Angeles County Board of Supervisors publicly directed the Chief Executive Office to assess the feasibility of consolidating the county's three health departments into a single unified health agency. This was preceded by correspondence between the Board and Mitchell Katz, the then current director of Health Services, who had submitted a confidential proposal to integrate the three departments on January 2, 2015.

On October 6, 2015, the Board adopted an ordinance to create the Health Agency, effective November 5, 2015. The proposal was criticized by community advocates, providers, and labor unions, who have argued that physical health services would be prioritized above mental and public health services, and potential conflicts of interest. The Health Agency is led by the Health Agency Director, who oversees, manages, coordinates, monitors and evaluates the Agency's programs and services.

During the COVID-19 pandemic the department was criticized for its handling of nursing homes.

== See also ==
- Los Angeles County Department of Health Services
- Los Angeles County Department of Mental Health
- Los Angeles County Department of Public Health
