= Wilcox Avenue =

Street in Los Angeles, California, United States

Coordinates: 34°5′55″N 118°19′51″W

- Interactive map of Wilcox Avenue
- Namesake: Harvey H. and Daeida Wilcox
- Maintained by: Bureau of Street Services, Los Angeles Department of Water and Power
- Length: 2 mi (3.2 km)
- North end: Cerritos Place
- Major junctions: SR 2
- South end: Rosewood Avenue

Wilcox Avenue is an avenue in Los Angeles, running north–south through Hollywood west of Cahuenga Boulevard.

== Name ==
Wilcox Avenue is named after Harvey H. and Daeida Wilcox, the founders of Hollywood.

== Route ==
Wilcox Avenue runs north-south for 2 miles (3.2 km) between Cerritos Place near Cahuenga Boulevard north of Franklin Avenue to Rosewood Avenue south of Melrose Avenue. It crosses Hollywood Boulevard, Sunset Boulevard, Fountain Avenue, and Santa Monica Boulevard.

== History ==
Wilcox Avenue grew primarily as an affluent residential road in the early 20th century, with the building of expensive luxury apartments. Silent actress Rosemary Theby lived at 1907 Wilcox Avenue.

== Landmarks ==
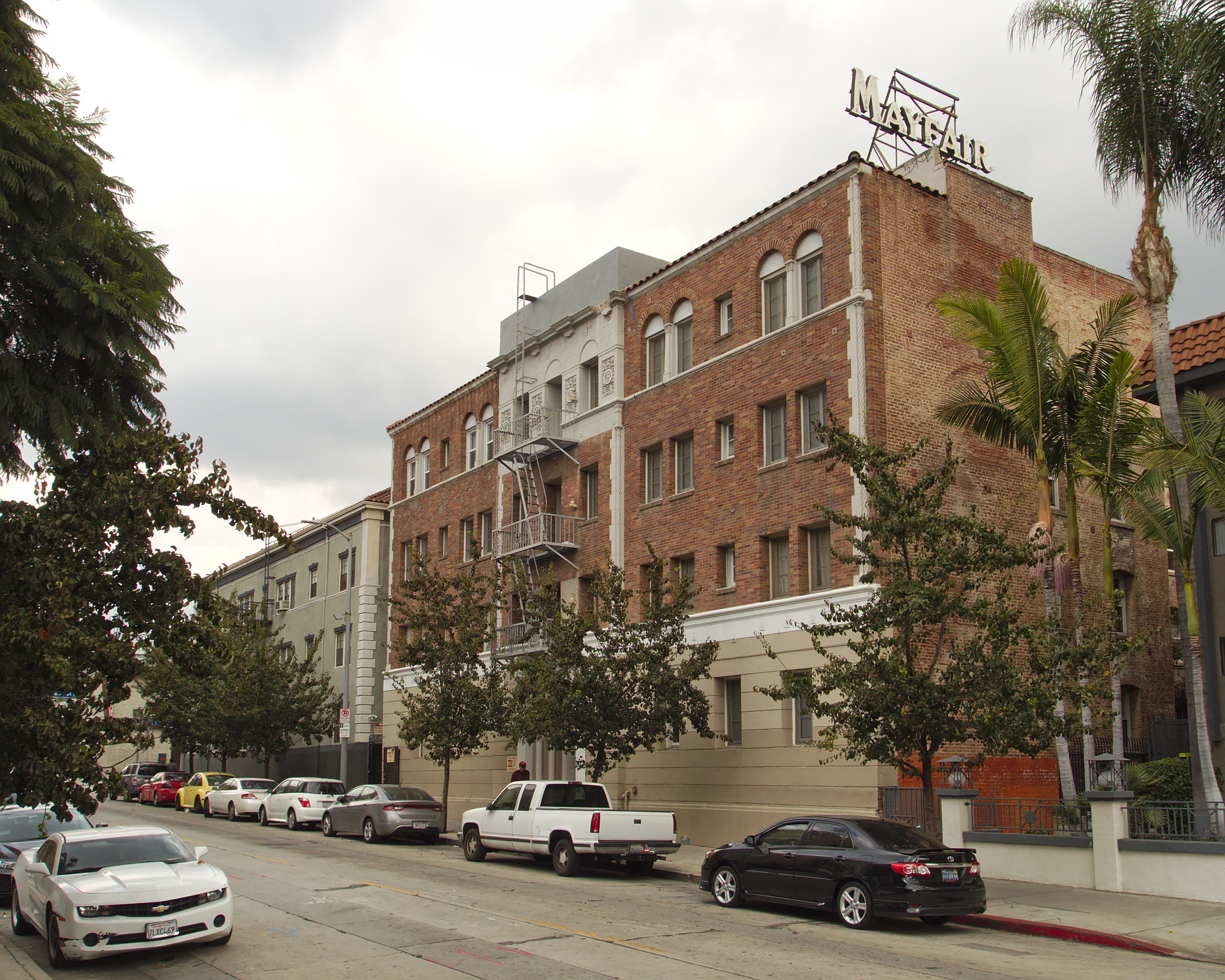
Mayfair Apartments

Several Los Angeles Historic Cultural Monuments are located on Wilcox Avenue: NRHP-listed Warner Brothers Hollywood Theater Building, McDonnell Residence Founder's Home: Urban Academy, Orchard Gables Cottage, Mayfair Apartments and Rooftop Neon Sign, Hollywood Citizen-News Building, The Complex, and Amasis Apartments. NRHP-listed Attie Building and Hollywood Post Office are located on Wilcox Avenue as well, as is Hotel Mark Twain.

Several bars and restaurants are located on Wilcox Avenue, including Paladar, a Cuban restaurant and bar at 1651 Wilcox Avenue, and The Nacional, a Havana-style cocktail bar next door at 1645.
