= William Allen (California architect) =

Jewish American architect

- Born: August 29, 1901
- Died: March 22, 1986 (aged 84)
- Occupation: Architect
- Spouse: Suzanne Allen
- Parent(s): Abraham and Bessie Allen
- Buildings: Burbank City Hall; Mayfair Apartments; Alhambra City Hall

William Allen (August 29, 1901 – February 22, 1986) was a Jewish-American architect known for his work in and around Los Angeles, California. He is best known for designing Burbank City Hall with William George Lutzi.

== Early life ==
William Allen was born on August 29, 1901, to Abraham and Bessie Allen. According to US Census data, Abraham immigrated from Russia to the United States in 1888, was naturalized in 1896, and his four children were all born in Illinois; however, other sources state William was born in Russia. The entire family was Jewish.

William attended Cook Engineering School in Chicago, Illinois from 1921 to 1924.

== Career ==
By 1925, William was working as an architectural designer in Los Angeles, California. He partnered with Allen Kelly Ruoff c. 1928–1929 and William George Lutzi from 1939 to 1953.

== Personal life and death ==
William Allen married Suzanne, 20 years his junior, in 1950. Suzanne was French and William had traveled to France that year.

William died on February 22, 1986.

William was an avid traveler, having reportedly visited Mexico, Italy, Germany, Belgium, Holland, Norway, and throughout North America, South America, and Africa. He visited France multiple times; on one trip he returned to the US via the RMS Queen Mary and on another via SS Île de France.

== List of works ==
Notable Allen works include:

=== With Lutzi ===
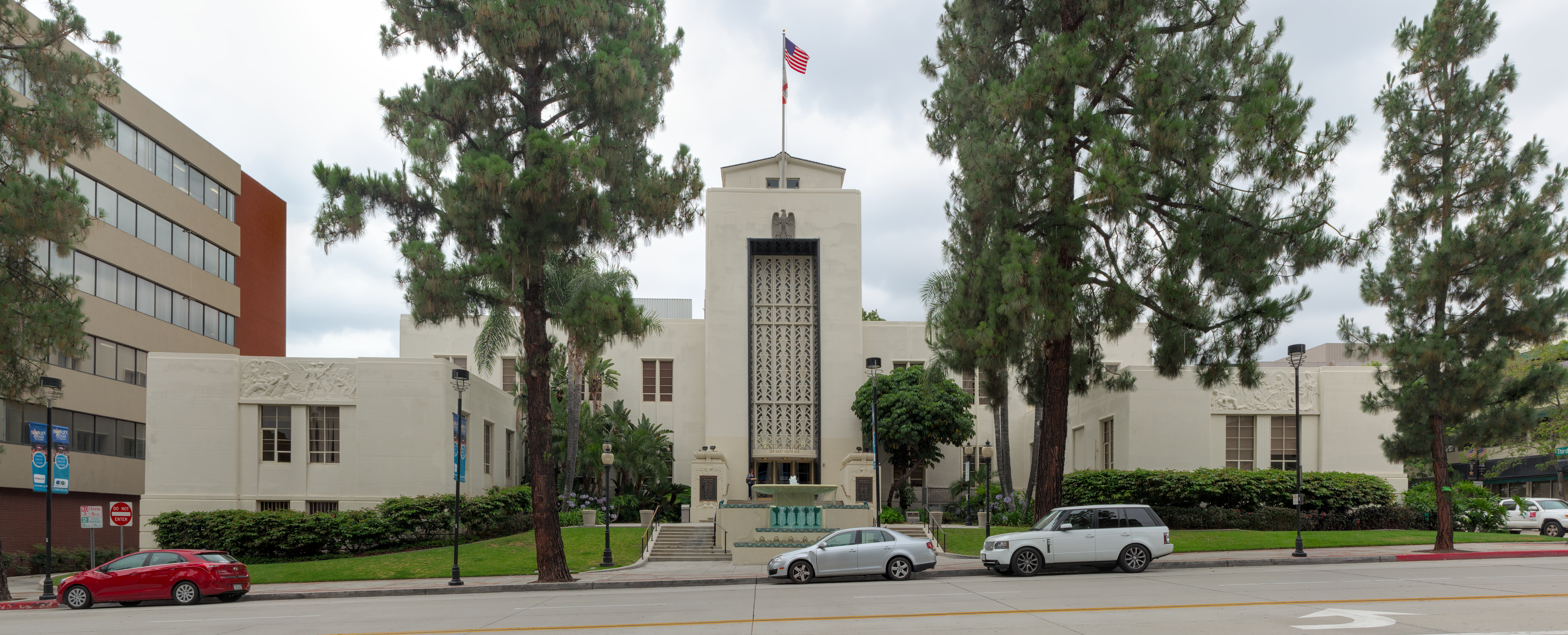
Burbank City Hall

- Los Angeles Brick Exchange Building (1939)
- Burbank City Hall and courtyard fountain (1941) NRHP-listed
- South Gate Civic Center (1941–1942)
- South Gate City Hall (1947)
- South Gate Swim Stadium (1947)
- South Gate Municipal Auditorium (1948)
- Banning's War-Time Auto Court homes (1940s)
- Los Angeles Fire Station #7 (post 1947)

=== Other ===
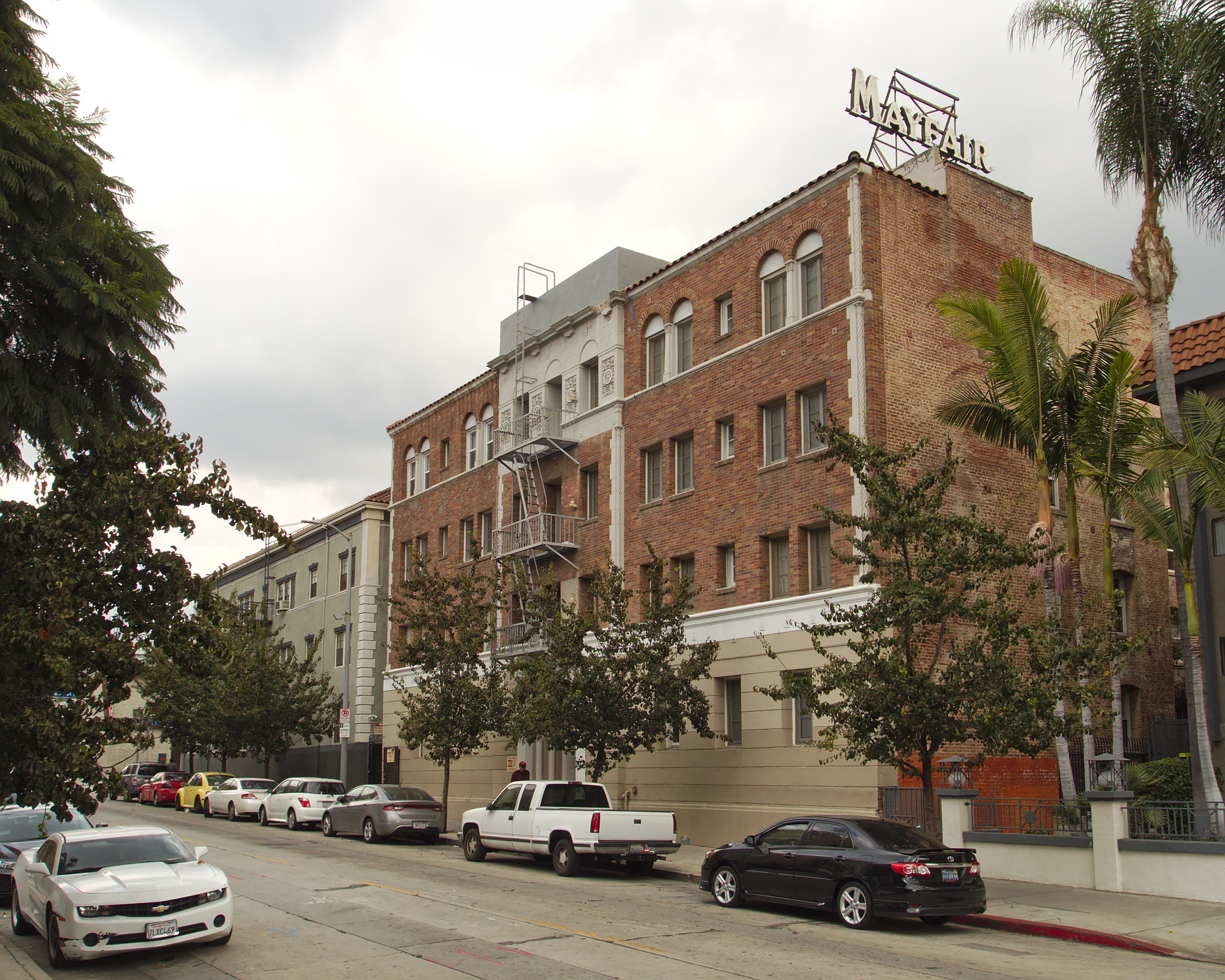
Mayfair Apartments

- Mayfair Apartments, Los Angeles (1925), LAHCM No. 867
- American Legion Memorial Building, Los Angeles (1925)
- Apartment building at 1825 N. Cahuenga Blvd (1925)
- Shelton Apartments, Los Angeles (1920s)
- Avondale Apartments, Los Angeles (1920s)
- Weston Apartment Hotel, Los Angeles (1920s)
- Los Angeles County Huntington Park Courthouse (1955)
- Los Angeles County Courthouse #4 (1956–1958)
- Alhambra City Hall (1960)
- Hollywood Sixty Club

== See also ==
- List of American architects
- List of people from Los Angeles
