= Barbara Ferrer =

American health official

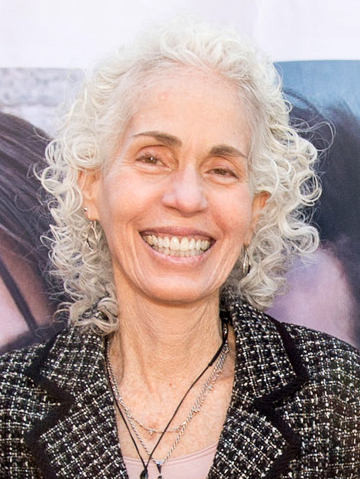
- Ferrer in 2020

Director of the Los Angeles County Department of Public Health
- Incumbent
- Assumed office January 10, 2017
- Preceded by: Jonathan Fielding

Personal details
- Born: Puerto Rico
- Children: 2
- Education: University of California, Santa Cruz (BA); Boston University (MS); University of Massachusetts, Boston (ME); Brandeis University (PhD)

Barbara Ferrer is an American health executive, serving as the Director of Los Angeles County Department of Public Health. She was highly visible in Los Angeles County during the COVID-19 pandemic.

== Early life and education ==
Ferrer was born in Puerto Rico and moved to Ohio to attend college, later dropping out after a year.

After graduating with a Bachelor of Arts in community studies from the University of California, Santa Cruz, Ferrer went on to earn a Master of Public Health from Boston University and a Master of Education from the University of Massachusetts, Boston. Ferrer earned her PhD in social welfare from Heller School for Social Policy and Management at Brandeis University in 1994.

== Career ==
Ferrer began with leadership roles in public health with five years at the Massachusetts Department of Public Health, where she was director of Health Promotion & Chronic Disease Prevention and later director of the Division of Maternal & Child Health. She also served as the executive director of the Boston Public Health Commission (2007-2014) and the chief strategy officer for the W.K. Kellogg Foundation.

In January 2017, Ferrer was appointed to the Los Angeles County Department of Public Health to replace interim director Cynthia Harding after previous director Jonathan Fielding retired in 2014. As director of L.A. County Department of Public Health, Ferrer has been prominent during the COVID-19 pandemic.

Ferrer currently sits on the advisory board of The Network for Public Health Law, a nonprofit offering legal support to public health officials across the U.S.

=== COVID-19 pandemic response ===
In March 2020, Ferrer responded to the COVID-19 pandemic in Los Angeles by ordering some of the most severe restrictions in the US, which resulted in countless businesses, public schools, public parks, and beaches, being shut down for several months. Ferrer also mandated the use of masks in Los Angeles County. She faced criticism for her response, with 233,000 residents testing positive and 5,500 dead by August 2020, with the number of deaths rising up to 24,000 by June 2021. LA County suffered 32,604 deaths due to covid as of July 23, 2022.

In July 2022, Ferrer gave public statements in making the case for a new mask mandate, which she was expected to announce on July 29. However several cities in LA County including Beverly Hills announced they would refuse to enforce her new mandate. In addition, the Alliance of Los Angeles County Parents filed a lawsuit against Ferrer and the L.A. Public Health Department, alleging their decisions had been “arbitrary, capricious and entirely lacking in evidentiary support,” and that the rights of children to the equal protection of the law were being violated. On July 28, she announced there would not be a new mandate, claiming her reversal was due to lowered COVID-19 transmission rates.

== Personal life ==
Ferrer resides in Los Angeles County. She is married, and has two children and two grandchildren.
