= Los Angeles County Department of Public Health =

Public health services provider for Los Angeles County residents

Department overview
- Formed: July 6, 2006
- Preceding department: LA County Department of Health Services
- Jurisdiction: Los Angeles County
- Headquarters: 313 N. Figueroa St., Los Angeles, California; 34.10145°N 117.978133°W
- Employees: 4 ,258 (2010)
- Annual budget: US$893,000,000 (2012–2013)
- Department executives: Barbara Ferrer, Director; Jeffrey D. Gunzenhauser, Interim Health Officer and Medical Director
- Website: publichealth.lacounty.gov

The Los Angeles County Department of Public Health (DPH) provides public health services to Los Angeles County residents. Barbara Ferrer is the Director for the Los Angeles County Department of Public Health. Muntu Davis is the Los Angeles County Public Health Officer. Jeffrey Gunzenhauser is the Interim Health Officer and Medical Director for Los Angeles County.

With a budget of 893 million dollars, Public Health has 39 programs and 14 public health centers to serve 10 million LA County residents.

The department works with the County's two other health departments, the Los Angeles County Department of Health Services and the Los Angeles County Department of Mental Health, in a cooperative healthcare integration effort.

== Programs ==
Public Health programs include:

- Environmental health: operates restaurant rating system and grading systems for apartments and rental homes; inspects sewage treatment and water plants; enforces state and local environmental laws
- Chronic disease and injury prevention; including tobacco control and prevention, nutrition, senior health, physical activity promotion, and injury and violence prevention
- Communicable disease control and prevention; including acute communicable disease, immunizations, veterinary public health, tuberculosis control, and public health laboratory
- Substance abuse prevention and control
- HIV & STD programs
- Community health services
- Health assessment & epidemiology
- Health facilities inspection
- Children's medical services
- Maternal, child, and adolescent health
- Emergency preparedness and response

== History ==
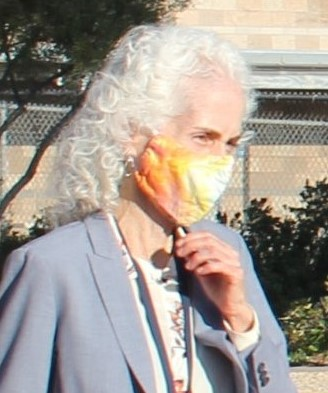
Barbara Ferrer, Director of LA County Department of Public Health

Until the Los Angeles County Board of Supervisors approved the establishment of Public Health on May 30, 2006, public health functions were assumed by the Los Angeles County Department of Health Services. the Department of Public Health was formally established on July 7, 2006.

On May 10, 2013, the AIDS Healthcare Foundation (AHF) submitted 70,000 signatures to qualify a City of Los Angeles ballot measure, the "City of Los Angeles Public Health Protection Act," on creating a separate Los Angeles City Public Health Department to be placed on the June 2014 ballot. AHF claims that the Department of Public Health has fallen short in managing several public health issues, including tuberculosis and syphilis, accusing it of having a corrupt, bloated and inefficient bureaucracy.

However, the Los Angeles City Council has opposed this proposal, as Los Angeles City has contracted for public health services with the County since 1964, as part of a consolidation effort to reduce duplication and improve efficiency of services, and the city's desire to transfer financial responsibility for public health services to the County tax base.

The city is considering a lawsuit over the validity of the AHF-backed ballot initiative on the basis that it would not have the necessary funds or expertise to effectively enforce public health laws via this route. The annual costs of operating an independent public health department would be roughly $261 million. On September 17, 2013, the County Board of Supervisors also voted unanimously to oppose that ballot measure. AHF is a longtime County contractor with a strained relationship to the County—an audit in August 2012 found that AHF had overbilled the Department of Public Health by more than $1.7 million.

On March 27, 2014, founding director Jonathan Fielding announced that he would retire from the department and return to UCLA "to help train future health leaders and do research on how we can be even more effective."

On January 13, 2015, the Board of Supervisors by unanimous decision approved the concept of integrating all health departments: Department of Health Services (DHS), Mental Health (DMH), and Public Health (DPH) to create a unified health agency (Health Agency). It was later motioned by Michael D. Antonovich on August 11, 2015. In February 2020 continued integration efforts were directed to the similar Alliance for Health Integration, whose chair rotates annually between the three health department directors.

The cities of Long Beach and Pasadena have their own public health departments that were established in the late 1800s when their cities were first incorporated, while the City of Vernon has a Health & Environmental Control Department.
