= Amasis Apartments =

Historic apartment building in Hollywood, California. U.S.

General information
- Type: Apartment building
- Location: 747 N. Wilcox Avenue, Hollywood, Los Angeles, California, U.S.
- Coordinates: 34°05′06″N 118°19′53″W
- Completed: 1926

Design and construction
- Architect: John Manley Close

Los Angeles Historic-Cultural Monument
- Designated: April 2, 2025
- Reference no.: 1320

Amasis Apartments is a historic apartment building located at 747 N. Wilcox Avenue in Hollywood, Los Angeles, California. It was declared Los Angeles Historic-Cultural Monument No. 1320 in 2025.

== History ==
Amasis Apartments was designed by John Manley Close, one of Los Angeles’s only prolific early 20th century Egyptian Revival architects, and built as an apartment hotel for G. G. Wright in 1926. Construction was budgeted at $35,000 ($636,513 in 2025) and the building originally contained forty apartment units. Built as an apartment hotel, A. L. Hershner took over ownership of the building in January 1928, Dorothy S. and Bessie S. Rubin took over ownership from him one month later, and the building was sold at auction the following year.

The building was declared Los Angeles Historic-Cultural Monument No. 1320 on April 2, 2025.

== Architecture and design ==
Amasis Apartments features an Egyptian Revival design and features massing, materials, a roofline, and ornamentation meant to resemble an Egyptian temple. The building’s façade consists of a stylized Ancient Egyptian temple that projects from the building, and the façade’s stucco is scored to simulate stone. The sides of the building, meant to resemble an Egyptian pylon, are tapered and topped by large cavetto. The front is symmetrical, seven bays wide, and features simplified columns and a recessed entrance under a pointed horseshoe arch. Alcoves featuring reverse ogee openings flank the horseshoe arch, while a bowed balcony with curved wrought iron railing and a recessed rectangular entrance is located above. The corners of the building feature multifoil arched openings and the façade also features hieroglyphics as well as floral and geometric detailing painted in various places.

Architecture historians David Gebhard and Robert Winter describe the non-façade portions of Amasis Apartments as a “pure Los Angeles stucco box.” The building, made of wood with cement and stucco cladding, is two stories tall, has a flat roof, is roughly rectangular with shallow side setbacks, and it fills the majority of its rectangular parcel. It is fronted by a small lawn and sidewalk, while narrow alleyways surrounding the rest of the building. Two sets of painted steps lead to and through the front entranceway. The interior features archways and wood floors.

Originally, the building’s windows were multi-light wood casement; however, most were replaced with jalousies. Despite this, the building’s architectural integrity is considered high.
