= Hollywood Citizen-News =

Newspaper in Hollywood, California

- Type: Daily newspaper
- Founder(s): A.A. Bynon; F.S. Bynon
- Founded: 1900 (as The Cahuenga Valley Sentinel)
- Ceased publication: 1970
- Language: English
- City: Hollywood, California

The Hollywood Citizen-News was a newspaper published in Hollywood, Los Angeles, California. It originated in 1900 and ceased in 1970. The Citizen-News was a "flourishing medium-sized daily, concentrating its coverage on Hollywood," according to the Van Nuys News. "In the late 1930s, the paper led many a reform fight in local government." Under Harlan G. Palmer, Sr., the newspaper had a liberal editorial voice and its staff were granted editorial autonomy and expected to adhere to standard journalistic ethics. It was located in the Hollywood Citizen-News Building.

== History ==
=== Early years ===
On Feb. 3, 1900, The Cahuenga Valley Sentinel was first published in Hollywood, California. It was founded by A.A. Bynon and F.S. Bynon. At some point it was acquired by T.W. Lincoln, who renamed it to the Hollywood News.

In July 1903, A.A. Bynon required the paper and renamed it to the Hollywood Sentinel. O.W. Smith joined him as co-owner and the two purchased a new press for the venture. That December, Bynon sold his interest to G.P. Sullivan, who then succeeded him as editor. In April 1904, the Sentinel was then acquired by C.N. Whitaker, former editor of the Monrovia Messenger.

On April 23, 1905, the Hollywood Citizen was first published. It was founded by William Chandler Parcher, and his father-in-law Ezekial Dunton Taylor. Parcher served as publisher, and Taylor served as editor. The Sentinel was acquired by Morris & Ponay, of Portland, Oregon, in November 1904, followed by Charles I. Mosteller, of Los Angeles, in November 1905.

A few years later in early 1909, local poet W.D. Cowley, who was the caretaker at the home of Los Angeles Times publisher Harrison Gray Otis, got into conflict with Sentinel editor Herbert F. Clark after he rejected his poem for publication. Clark offered to publish the work if Cowley paid for it as advertising, which he refused. Clark then wrote a column criticizing Cowley's poetry. The two then got into a fist fight outside the paper's office which spectators say Clark won.

In mid-1909, Hollywood incorporated as a city and passed an ordnance that all legal advertising must be done in a daily newspaper. In response, both the Sentinel and the Citizen announced plans to expand from weekly to daily publication in order to bid on the contract. It was expected both papers would try to underbid and that whichever paper failed to land the contract would cease. Parcher acquired the Owens Valley Herald in 1910, and Taylor soon left Hollywood to join him. In January 1911, E.E. Brown purchased both the Hollywood Sentinel and the Hollywood Citizen and combined the two under the Citizen masthead.

=== Judge Palmer ===
In April 1911, Harlan G. Palmer, Sr. acquired the Citizen. That fall, H.G. Palmer enrolled at the University of Southern California and in 1913 passed the bar exam, and opened the first lay office in Hollywood. In December 1914, H.G. Palmer acquired a second paper from Charles Hiram Randall called the Highland Park Herald. A year later he installed a new Intertype Corporation line-casting machine to use for both papers. In September 1915, H.G. Palmer was appointed Justice of the peace for Los Angeles Township. In January 1916, the Herald was sold to D.C. Welty. In 1918, H.G. Palmer was reelected as a city justice. He ran for Los Angeles Superior Court but in September 1920 dropped out of the primary race. By December, he had resigned his judgeship, in order to devote more time to expanding his business.

In January 1921, his father George W. Palmer died at age 67. In April 1921, ground was broken on the Palmer Building, a three-story structure to house a new printing plant. H.G. Palmer invested $250,000 into the project. In August 1921, the Citizen expanded from a weekly into a daily, and the plant was to be completed that December. Also in December 1921, H.G. Palmer was elected to the inaugural board of directors for the Hollywood Chamber of Commerce.

==== Merger ====
At some point a rival newspaper called the Hollywood News was established. In 1922, E.A. Dickson and Frederick William Kellogg acquired the News and the Los Angeles Express from the estate of Edwin T. Earl.

In February 1928, Kellogg Newspapers, Inc. sold 15 papers including the News to Ira C. Copley, of Aurora, Illinois, for $4 million. Copley took immediate possession of the News and Glendale Daily Press, while the others would be operated under a holding company to be known as the Copley Press starting that September. General manager Samuel G. McClure said that the Hollywood News would be immediately expanded, but that no changes would be made in the other papers.

On Aug. 1, 1931, the Hollywood News Building was completed. It housed a Goss multiple unit press, capable of producing 72,000 16-page papers an hour. In October 1931, Copley sold the News to Harlan G. Palmer, Sr. and his brother Orlando T. Palmer for $600,000. It was then merged with the Citizen to form the Hollywood Citizen-News. The combined circulation was expected to be more than 30,000.

==== District Attorney campaign ====
In June 1936, Mary Grattan Palmer, mother of Harlan G. Palmer, died. Around that time paperwork was filed for Palmer to run for Los Angeles County District Attorney. However, in an editorial titled "I Am Not Seeking Office," Palmer writes while he did give permission for a local committee to put forward his name, he would not campaign, he would not accept donations or spent any money on the election, and that the Citizen-News would support candidate Ralph Evans. The Shawnee Morning News of Oklahoma called it "the most peculiar political announcement of the season."

Palmer received enough votes to advance from the August primary, which led Evans, who was a distant third, to throw his support behind him. Palmer lost in the November general to incumbent Buron Fitts. Despite not campaigning, Palmer still received 48.5% of the votes cast.

==== 1938 strike ====
The editorial staff struck and picketed the plant on May 17, 1938, in the first walkout called by the American Newspaper Guild in California. Managing editor Harold Swisher said other workers were being hired and that production employees were on the job as usual. Publisher Harlan G. Palmer, Sr. discharged three of the Guild members while negotiations were going on.

Sontag Company filed suit against the Los Angeles Newspaper Guild and others, contending it was damaged by union pickets at its Hollywood drug store. A Superior Court judge issued a temporary restraining order against the union prohibiting it from picketing 166 companies that continued their advertising in the struck newspaper. The order against this secondary picketing was later made permanent. The union took the matter to the National Labor Relations Board. The strike ended on July 30, 1938, with an agreement between the two sides.

Superior Judge Emmet Wilson, however, ruled that six guild members he had cited for contempt of court must stand trial. The union lost an appeal to the United States Circuit Court of Appeals which had been asked to rule on its claim, among others, that the company had violated labor law when it denied bylines to some employees who had been involved in the strike. The court held that it was within the right of the employer to make such a decision for business reasons.

=== Post-Palmer ===
On July 25, 1956, Harlan G. Palmer, Sr. died age age 71, and later interned at Hollywood Forever Cemetery. He was succeeded as publisher by his son, Harlan G. Palmer Jr. In 1961, David B. Heyler acquired the Citizen-News and its seven weeklies papers from the Palmer family. At that time Heyler owned another daily, the Beverly Hills Citizen, and 10 weeklies. In January 1962, Heyler announced that the Citizen-News would have separate editions for three districts of the Los Angeles area: one for Hollywood and the metropolitan area, the second for Beverly Hills west to Santa Monica, and the third for the San Fernando Valley.

=== Copeland ownership ===
In July 1964, Lammot du Pont Copeland Jr., owner of the daily San Fernando Valley Times and two weeklies, purchased the Citizen-News and its 27 weeklies from Heyer. At that time the Valley Times had a circulation of 47,387, the Citizen-News had a circulation of 26,594, and the weeklies had a total circulation of 450,000. A spokesman said it was the largest community-newspaper group in the United States. The holding company was called Graphic Production Corporation. The St. Louis Post-Dispatch later reported Copeland Jr. acquired these California papers "apparently as a forum for his ultra-conservative views."

In May 1966, the Hollywood Chamber of Commerce presented the Citizen-News with a bronze plague commemorating "60 years of community service." In September 1967, Ronald R. Howard, president of the holding company Video Corp., announced it had reached an agreement to acquire a 90% interest in Graphic Production Corp. from Copeland Jr. in a stock swap. By that December, it was reported Video Corp. had no remaining assets, indicating the deal had not been implemented.

In January 1969, Copeland Jr. named company president Phil Turner to succeeded him as publisher. In February 1969, the paper announced it would offer subscribers an accident insurance policy "unrivaled in all of America for its range of benefits." In April 1970, a fire caused $500 worth of damage to the paper's printing plant. During the clean up operations, fans accidently reignited the embers and trigged the overhead sprinkler system, resulting in $50,000 worth of water damage to the facility.

==== Financial troubles ====
By 1970, revenue for the newspaper group had fallen from $9 million to $5 million from when Copeland Jr. acquired the Citizen-News. At this time Copeland Jr. was paying himself a "consulting fee" of $13,000 a month and used any revenue generated to prop up another weekly chain he owned in Northern California. The Star Tribune Company sued Copeland Jr. seeking nearly $800,000 in missing payment for the Valley Times papers. Around this time Copeland Jr. appointed Richard M. Horton, a consultant who initially was brought in to help the sell the papers, as publisher and tasked him with saving the company. Horton, previously known as Edward J. Levin, was a federal parolee with a long felony record for fraud and embezzlement, and had no prior journalism experience.

However, Horton was publicly open about his past crimes and the Post-Dispatch reported he "made heroic efforts to save the day" by laying off half the staff and closing several papers. In March 1970, the Hollywood Citizen-News was redesigned and renamed to the Los Angeles Evening Citizen-News. Conservative columnists were relaced with liberal ones and the Valley Times, which had previously been absorbed into the Citizen-News as local edition, was spun out into a separate weekly. The recent changes at the paper partly attributed to a $1.3 million loan from the Journeymen Barbers' International Union's pension fund. At that time, Copeland Jr. claimed to have sold the Citizen-News to an investment group led by C.E. Williams, who the Los Angeles Times later identified as one of his attorney's and found records that showed no change of ownership actually took place.

By June 1970, the Star Tribune Co. suit had quietly been settled out of court. Around this time the paper's loan from the union pension fund was one of several which became the subject of a federal grand jury investigation in Chicago. It was alleged a close associate of Copeland Jr., Thomas Shaheen, acted as an investment counselor for the pension fund and received a $21,00 brokerage fee for securing the paper's loan, among others.

In early July 1970, the Barbers' Union's pension fund sued Copley Jr. for repayment of a separate $200,000 loan given for his Mission Bay Campland project. Later that month, a New Jersey paper firm called the Garden State Paper Co. sued the Citizen-News for an unpaid $212,000 bill for newsprint. A writ of attachment was put against the paper's assets and the local sheriff's office sent two deputies to the paper's office. An agreement was reached between the publisher and creditor, allowing the paper to continue publishing and the deputies were withdrawn. Production was only disrupted by only 30 minutes.

In August 1979, a finance firm which the paper owed $450,000 sent a team of security guards to the paper's office and announced it was taking possession of the building. That night Horton assembled a group of 300 employees, lawyers and others and at 6 a.m. they attempted to storm the building. Horton and a few others slipped inside through an open window and claimed they had established a legal presence and claimed the security guards were trespassing and must leave unless they could get a court order. The guards refused to leave and reopen the building, so Horton ordered his employees to break in. The group smashed several large windows and, with the help of local police, pushed the guards out the door. In response, the finance company went to the Internal Revenue Service and got it to take action for nonpayment of taxes.

==== Closure ====
On Aug. 17, 1970, in an effort to continue the paper, the Graphic Production Corp. filed a request to be placed into federal receivership and then filed for Chapter 11 Bankruptcy. Attorney George T. Goggin was named receiver. An hour after appearing in court, the IRS seized the Citizen-News for nonpayment of employee withholding trust fund taxes totaling about $300,000. Goggin reached an agreement with the IRS to continue publication through Friday via a lease if he could secure $40,000 for payroll. Employees produced 20-page Monday evening edition in spite of a creditor locking the building over the weekend, but whether it would continue another day was not certain. Goggin was successful in securing the funds, and a second 20-page edition was printed on Tuesday. That week the paper had an income of $85,000 with $80,000 in expenses. The company's total debt was $2.58 million.

All staff had worked for several weeks without pay in order to save the paper. But on the night of Aug. 27, publisher Horton told staff receiver Goggin was unable to secure enough funds to continue publication. On Aug. 28, the Citizen-News published what would be it's final issue as a daily paper, with a black-bordered front page featuring a story announcing it would temporarily suspended operations after seven decades in business. The chain's remaining 17 weeklies and semi-weeklies were suspended too. At that time the paper had 321 employees, including 40 on the editorial staff. Totals assets were $2.775 million, about $700,000 more than total liabilities. On Aug. 29, executive editor Philip Nye told the Los Angeles Herald Examiner there was little hope in reviving the paper. The end of the Citizen-News left only two daily newspapers published within the Los Angeles city limits.

== Revival attempts ==
=== First attempt ===
On Aug. 30, 1970, Goggin arranged a meeting with an anonymous party interested in reviving the Citizen-News. On Oct. 20, Copeland Jr. filed a petition for personal bankruptcy. With liabilities listed at $55 million, at that time it was the largest personal bankruptcy in history. On Oct. 29, the Citizen-News was officially ruled bankrupt after it failed to secure $400,000 with Goggin, who had received possible bids for other papers, including from the owners of the Oakland Tribune.

In April 1971, federal bankruptcy referee Russell B. Seymour approved a plan submitted by Horton to reorganize the Citizen-News under a new company. All debts belonging to Graphic Productions Corp. would be paid in cash or stock in the new business. John Austin, the paper's former entertainment editor, was named the new editor. However, Horton failed to raise the required $190,000 by May 7 per his agreement with Seymour, and all the paper's remaining assets went up for sale at government auction.

=== Second attempt ===
On May 11, 1971, at the auction, real estate investor Benjamin Smithm of Beverly Hill, took possession of the paper's land and four buildings with his high bid at $400,000. Ben Slavkin, a Los Angeles printing machine dealer, bought a 96-page high-speed press for $13,500 and the mastheads of the Citizen-News and 16 weeklies for $32,048. A month later Horton announced arrangements had been made to relaunch the Citizen-News under a new corporation called Citizen-News Publications, Inc. The revival was made possible when Horton teamed up with investor Harold Greenlin to buy the paper's old printing equipment and lease it's building.

On June 30, the first weekly issue of the relaunched paper was published. Robert L. Whearley was editor. Three weeks later, publisher Horton fired Whearley on July 19. The ousted editor then attempted to recruit a group of New York investors and buy the paper, thus restoring his former position. Leo Guild, the paper's former television editor, replaced Whearley and Austin was named executive editor. At this time, management also announced plans to likely layoff some of its 77 workers, some of which said they had not been paid. Also, Bank of America was informed only to honor checks signed by Greenlin, not Horton, indicating the publisher had lost control of the business.

In December 1971, a judge appointed David A. Gill as receiver of the Citizen-News after Equitable Factors Co. charged the two principal owners, Greenlin and Harold Cohn, as liable for $13,000 of a $15,000 loan, and had alleged they diverted $9,000 in accounts receivable to personal use rather than paying off the debt. In August 1972, ex-publisher Horton was arrested for issuing a $1,000 check without sufficient funds and for issuing 13 bad payroll checks to employees while at the paper. He was released on $6,500 bail a day later.

=== Third attempt ===
In December 1972, William R. Green, operating under the name CN Publishing Corp., announced he had acquired the Citizen-News and its nine other associated publications, all of which would resume weekly publication on Dec. 23. Green was publisher and Guild was executive editor.

== Notable employees ==
- John Ducey, ice hockey writer
- Homer D. King, managing editor
- Morton Thompson, writer
