= High Desert Regional Health Center =

- Los Angeles County Department of Health Services

Geography
- Location: 335 East Avenue I Lancaster, Los Angeles County, California, U.S.

Organisation
- Care system: Public
- Type: Community

History
- Founded: 2014

Links
- Website: dhs.lacounty.gov/health-centers/highdesert/
- Lists: Hospitals in U.S.

High Desert Regional Medical Center, also known as HDRHC, or by the name High Desert Regional, is a 142,000-square-foot ambulatory care clinic located at 335 East Avenue I in the Lancaster, California It is operated by the Los Angeles County Department of Health Services through its Ambulatory Care Network (ACN).

The medical facility was awarded the 2015 DBIA National Design-Build Project/Team Award in the healthcare facility category. Artist Brad Howe was commissioned to design a sculpture titled "One Desert Sky" that hangs over the lobby of the facility.
