= Burbank City Hall =

- City Hall–City of Burbank
- U.S. National Register of Historic Places
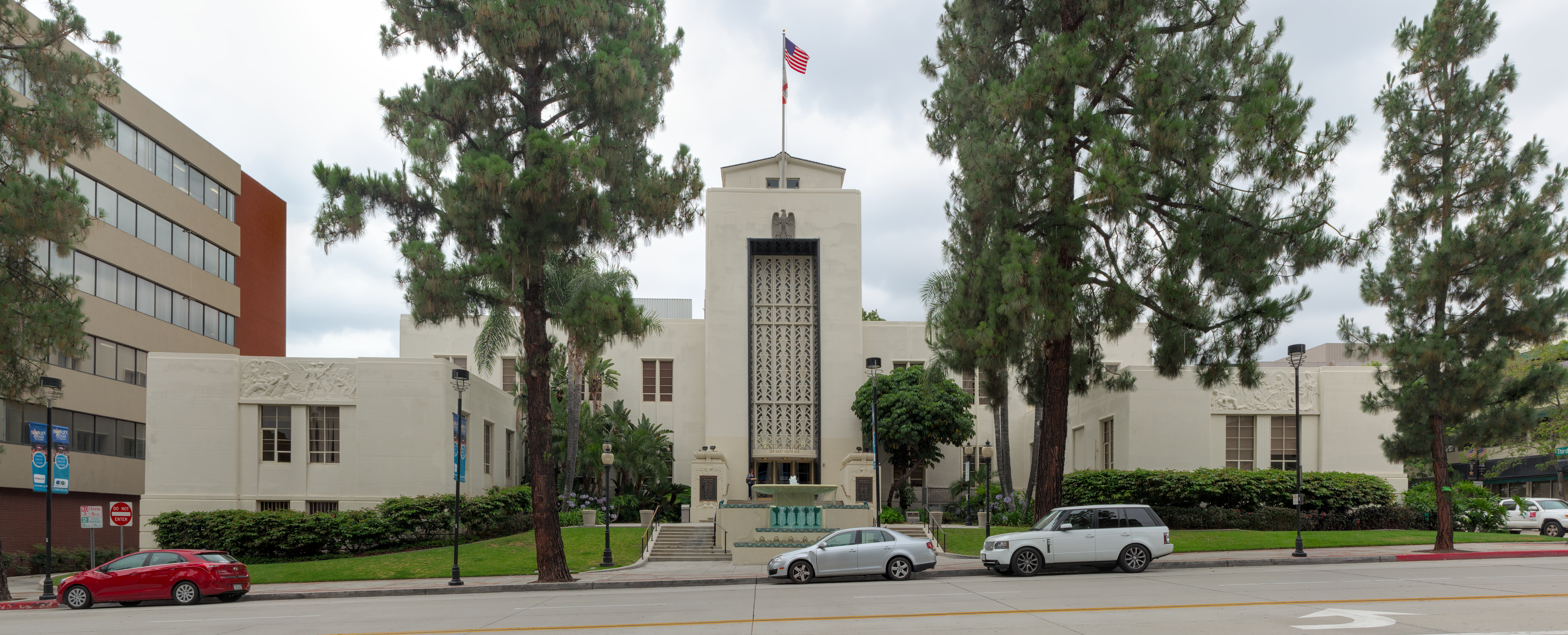
- Burbank City Hall

- Location within the Los Angeles metropolitan area Location within California Location within the United States
- Location: 275 E. Olive Ave., Burbank, California
- Coordinates: 34°10′55″N 118°18′27″W
- Built: 1943
- Architect: William Allen and W. George Lutzi
- Architectural style: Moderne
- NRHP reference No.: 96000426
- Added to NRHP: April 18, 1996

Burbank City Hall is the site of the municipal government of Burbank, California, and is listed on the National Register of Historic Places.

Designed by architects William Allen and W. George Lutzi in the Moderne or Art Deco style, ground was broken in February 1941 and construction was completed in 1943. The structure was partially funded by the Federal Works Agency, Works Progress Administration (WPA). It was completed at a total cost of $409,000.

Burbank City Councilman Ted McConkey told the Los Angeles Daily News in 1996: "Anyone walking into City Hall would recognize that it's something unique. It's special because of the period in which it was built, because of the way it's been maintained and because of all the murals at City Hall. We get an inordinate number of requests to use City Hall from film companies." When it was listed on the National Register of Historic Places in 1996, it became the second listed building in Burbank — the first being Burbank's main post office.

The structure's 77-foot tower serves as the main lobby and features art deco detailing and more than 20 types of marble, which can be found in the city seal on the floor, the trim, walls and in the treads and risers of the grand stairway. Its artistic features include several works: cast medallions, one bas-relief sculpture by Bartolo Mako titled 'A Tribute to Craftsmen" along Third Street, two bas-relief sculpture panels on the front facade of an unknown artist and a framed painting titled "Justice, also by Mako, for hanging in the City Attorney's office.

Burbank City Hall's most notable artistic features are the large murals painted by muralist Hugo Ballin. Ballin also painted the murals at the Griffith Observatory and Wilshire Boulevard Temple. There are two major Ballin murals at the Burbank City Hall: "The Four Freedoms" in the Council Chamber and "Burbank Industry" in the rotunda. In 2001, the building underwent a renovation project that included restoration of the Ballin murals.

The Council Chamber located on the second floor is noted for its teakwood-panelled walls and Ballin's "Four Freedoms" mural. The mural was inspired by Franklin Roosevelt's 1941 "Four Freedoms" speech and is considered one of Ballin's finest works. In keeping with Ballin's theme, one of the walls adjacent to the public seating section displays a framed print of Norman Rockwell's work Freedom of Speech. The chamber has built-in rails and tables. In 1978, the original carved wooden pews were replaced by padded theater-style seating, and the checkered floor was carpeted. During the 2001 renovation, the ceiling was returned to its original height revealing the top of the Four Freedoms mural that had been obscured for decades.

The "Burbank Industry" in the rotunda features Burbank-built airplanes, the motion picture industry, agriculture, and a power plant. In 1964, the bottom portion of the Burbank Industry mural was removed to make room for a bridge to an adjacent municipal building. After being stored for 37 years rolled in a plastic sheet at various times under a street bridge at the city's yards, in a bedroom on Amherst Drive, and at the Burbank Historical Society's Gordon Howard Museum, the 1964 building (and the bridge to it) were demolished and the lower section returned to its place and reattached by art conservators. The unveiling ceremony for all the restored art took place on September 10, 2001.
