= Barbara A. Garcia =

American community and public health leader

Barbara A. Garcia is an American community and public health leader. She is the CEO of HealthCare UnTold, LLC, a health multimedia and productions company dedicated to addressing the healthcare needs of vulnerable communities. Additionally, Garcia co-hosts the HealthCare UnTold podcast, where she shares insights and stories related to healthcare.

Garcia held the position of Director of health for the San Francisco Health Department, until she was forced to resign in 2018 over allegations of conflict of interest. She is also the co-founder of Salud Para La Gente, a farm worker health clinic, and was its director for over 12 years.

She was selected as a Health Leader by the Robert Wood Johnson Foundation for her response to the 1989 Loma Prieta earthquake in Watsonville.

She has been awarded two honorary doctorate degrees: one in 2008 from the California Institute of Integral Studies for her work in leadership and community service, and another in 2013 from the University of San Francisco for her role as a community health leader in advancing access to healthcare services for vulnerable communities in San Francisco.
