= Los Angeles County Department of Mental Health =

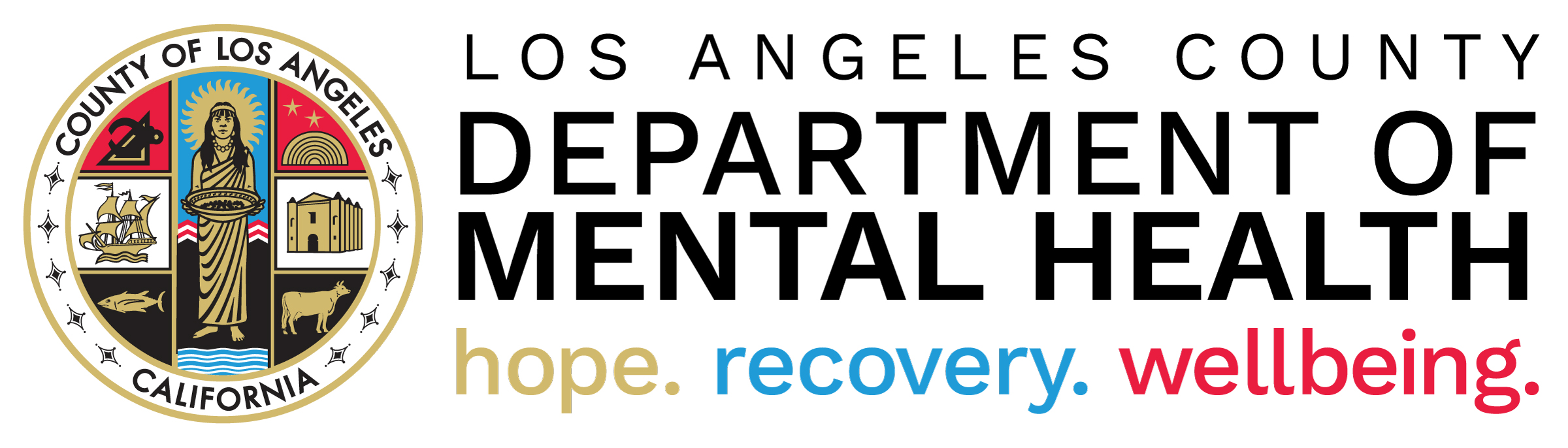

Department overview
- Jurisdiction: Los Angeles County
- Headquarters: Los Angeles, California; 34.064225°N 118.291431°W
- Employees: 4,011 (2010)
- Annual budget: US$1,584,061,000 (2010)
- Department executive: Lisa H. Wong, Psy.D., Director of Mental Health
- Website: dmh.lacounty.gov

The Los Angeles County Department of Mental Health (LACDMH or DMH), is the largest county mental health department in the United States and provides mental health services for Los Angeles County residents. DMH directly operates 75 program sites in the county and serves over 250,000 clients annually. DMH's headquarters is located on Vermont Avenue in Koreatown, Los Angeles, California.

The department works with the County's two other health departments, the Los Angeles County Department of Health Services and the Los Angeles County Department of Public Health, in a cooperative healthcare integration effort.

== List of LACDMH directors ==
- 1978-1984 Dr. John Richard "J.R." Elpers, Psy.D
- 1984-1992 Roberto Quiroz, MSW
- 1992-1998 Dr. Areta Crowell, Psy.D
- 1998-2016 Dr. Marvin Southard, DSW
- 2016-2022 Dr. Jonathan E. Sherin, M.D., Ph.D.
- 2023-present Dr. Lisa H. Wong, Psy.D.
