= Harlan G. Palmer =

American politician, judge, and publisher

Harlan G. Palmer (1885–1956) was a politician, judge, and newspaper publisher in Los Angeles County, California, in the early 20th century.

== Early life ==
He was born on March 19, 1885, in Le Roy, Minnesota, and attended the University of Minnesota. He purchased a weekly newspaper in Leroy and edited it for two years, then took his invalid father's place as head of a retail lumber and coal business.

== Career ==
Palmer came to California in 1911 and immediately purchased the weekly Hollywood Citizen. In the fall he enrolled in the University of California Law School and passed the state bar examination in 1913. He was the first attorney to set up practice in Hollywood, a small city ten miles east of Los Angeles.

In 1910 Hollywood was merged with the city of Los Angeles, and in 1915, Palmer was appointed one of the six judges of the Los Angeles Justice Court, which is now part of the municipal court system. He was elected to the same post in 1918 but resigned when the conversion of his newspaper to daily publication required more of his time.

He became a member of the city's Board of Water and Power Commissioners and later was a special attorney for the Los Angeles City Council during an investigation of that board.

He ran for Los Angeles County district attorney against the incumbent, Buron Fitts, and received 48.5 percent of the votes cast.

In his years as publisher, the Citizen-News campaigned against gambling and alleged police payoffs.

== Personal life ==
Palmer died in Los Angeles on July 25, 1956. He was survived by his wife, Ethelyn H. Palmer, and their children, Harlan Jr., Byron, Ralph, and Peggy. He had three siblings, William J., Orlando T., and Zuma Palmer. He is buried in Hollywood Cemetery.

== See also ==
- Palmer Building
