= Healthy San Francisco =

Health access program for uninsured residents of San Francisco, California

Healthy San Francisco is a health access program launched in 2007 to subsidize medical care for uninsured residents of San Francisco, California operated by the San Francisco Department of Public Health. The program's stated objective is to bring universal health care to the city.

Healthy San Francisco is not a true insurance program, as it does not cover services such as dental and vision care, and only covers services received in the city and county of San Francisco. The program itself acknowledges its limitations, and has stated that "insurance is always a better choice." Healthy San Francisco represents the first time a local government has attempted to provide health insurance for all of its constituents. The program is open to low-income city residents over the age of 18 who do not qualify for other public coverage, and who have had no insurance for at least 90 days. Eligibility is not conditional on citizenship, immigration, employment or health status. The program covers a range of services, but only pays providers within San Francisco. By July 2010, almost 90% of the uninsured adults in San Francisco — over 50,000 people — had enrolled in Healthy San Francisco.

== History ==
Prior to the implementation of Healthy San Francisco, the city's safety net health care system for the low-income and uninsured consisted of several community health clinics, a public hospital (San Francisco General Hospital), and a citywide managed care plan. In Mayor Gavin Newsom's first term, he worked to extend the city-funded health insurance program, started under Mayor Brown, to young adults, a program that had been previously offered only to children. Newsom's more ambitious plan on healthcare began to take shape in 2007. In his budget proposal for fiscal year 2007–2008, Newsom announced his intention to provide universal health care for all city residents, based on long-time City Supervisor Tom Ammiano's plan. The care would be provided through the San Francisco Health Access Plan also known as Healthy San Francisco. The system planned to improve coordination between the current health care safety net, focus on preventive care, and implement information technology through the use of electronic enrollment and referrals. Newsom's proposal has prompted Oakland mayor Ron Dellums and San Mateo County's Board of Supervisors to look into possibilities for providing their own taxpayer-subsidized health care.

=== Golden Gate Restaurant Association v. City and County of San Francisco ===
Healthy San Francisco mandated large businesses to provide health insurance for their employees, or instead either pay into a citywide healthcare fund or contribute to employees' health savings accounts. The Golden Gate Restaurant Association filed a lawsuit seeking to overturn this policy, claiming the employer mandate conflicted with ERISA. The Ninth Circuit Court of Appeals rejected their arguments in May 2009, and an appeal to the U.S. Supreme Court was declined on June 29, 2010, legally clearing the program for continued existence for the foreseeable future.

=== Impact of the Affordable Care Act ===
The Patient Protection and Affordable Care Act (ACA) was implemented in 2010 and health care exchanges were established in 2013. The 2010 Affordable Care Act also removed categorical eligibility for Medicaid, thus expanding the number of people who could enroll in the public insurance program. As a result, many who previously did not qualify for Medicaid and instead relied on Healthy San Francisco could enroll in Medi-Cal. Approximately half of Healthy San Francisco's 60,000 patients enrolled in 2013 became eligible for Medi-Cal due to this expansion. Another 10,000 or so Healthy San Francisco enrollees were predicted to get health insurance through the Covered California health exchange that was created as part of the Affordable Care Act. A 2011 report found that the passage of the ACA could reduce Healthy San Francisco enrollment by up to 60%.

Although the ACA led to many people becoming insured, there were still millions who were left without health coverage. Today in San Francisco, these patients are still eligible for Healthy San Francisco. These remaining patients include undocumented immigrants, prisoners, people who have lived in the city for less than 5 years and are thus ineligible for Covered California, and people whose incomes are too high above the Federal Poverty Line to qualify for Medi-Cal but not enough to afford private health insurance.

== Funding ==
Healthy San Francisco is funded by the city, the federal government, patient co-payments, and fees imposed on San Francisco businesses whose owners do not follow the mandate to provide health coverage for their employees. The Health Care Security Ordinance included a requirement that employers with more than 20 workers spend at least a minimum amount towards employee health coverage. The minimum payment for 2014 ranges from $1.63 to $2.44 per hour, depending on firm size; for-profit employers with fewer than 20 workers and non-profits with fewer than 50 workers are exempt. Employers can elect to satisfy this requirement by paying into Healthy San Francisco, in which case their workers may apply for the program. As of early May 2008, over 700 employers had decided to participate in the program. Early evidence suggest that employers are spending more on health benefits, but some are raising prices and cutting back on hiring.

Healthy San Francisco reportedly costs about $140 million per year, which is expected to go down as the 2013-2014 health exchanges start.

== Results and reception ==
94% of surveyed Healthy San Francisco enrollees reported that they were somewhat or mostly satisfied with the health access program. More than 90% would recommend it to a friend, but only 40% of participants said their care was considerably better since joining the program. Usage of primary and specialty care services among Healthy San Francisco enrollees was similar to that of the uninsured across the state of California.

Much of Healthy San Francisco's positive reception stems from the city's uniquely structured health care safety-net network, consisting of a conglomerate of both public and private hospitals, clinics, and health centers. This collaborative system allows for greater communication between providers and enables patients to access facilities that are equipped to offer the type of care they need, whether that be primary, specialty, or urgent care. The creation of a more coordinated system also led to more efficiency and less redundancy. As more patients became established in primary care medical homes, duplicative services waned.

San Francisco residents who have benefitted from Healthy San Francisco have noted how the program has made them less wary of accessing health care, as previously many of the beneficiaries of Healthy San Francisco did not see a provider regularly due to cost. Healthy San Francisco significantly affected access to ongoing care and chronic disease management for the uninsured, particularly because the Emergency Medical Treatment and Active Labor Act (EMTALA) had previously made emergency care available.

Although Healthy San Francisco does not directly impact those with private or public insurance, studies have found that increasing the proportion of people insured in a community can lead to higher quality of care even for those who are insured, particularly in terms of access to and availability of specialty care.

== See also ==
- Health care reform in the United States
