= Hollywood Boulevard Commercial and Entertainment District =

Historic district in Los Angeles, California

- U.S. National Register of Historic Places
- U.S. Historic district
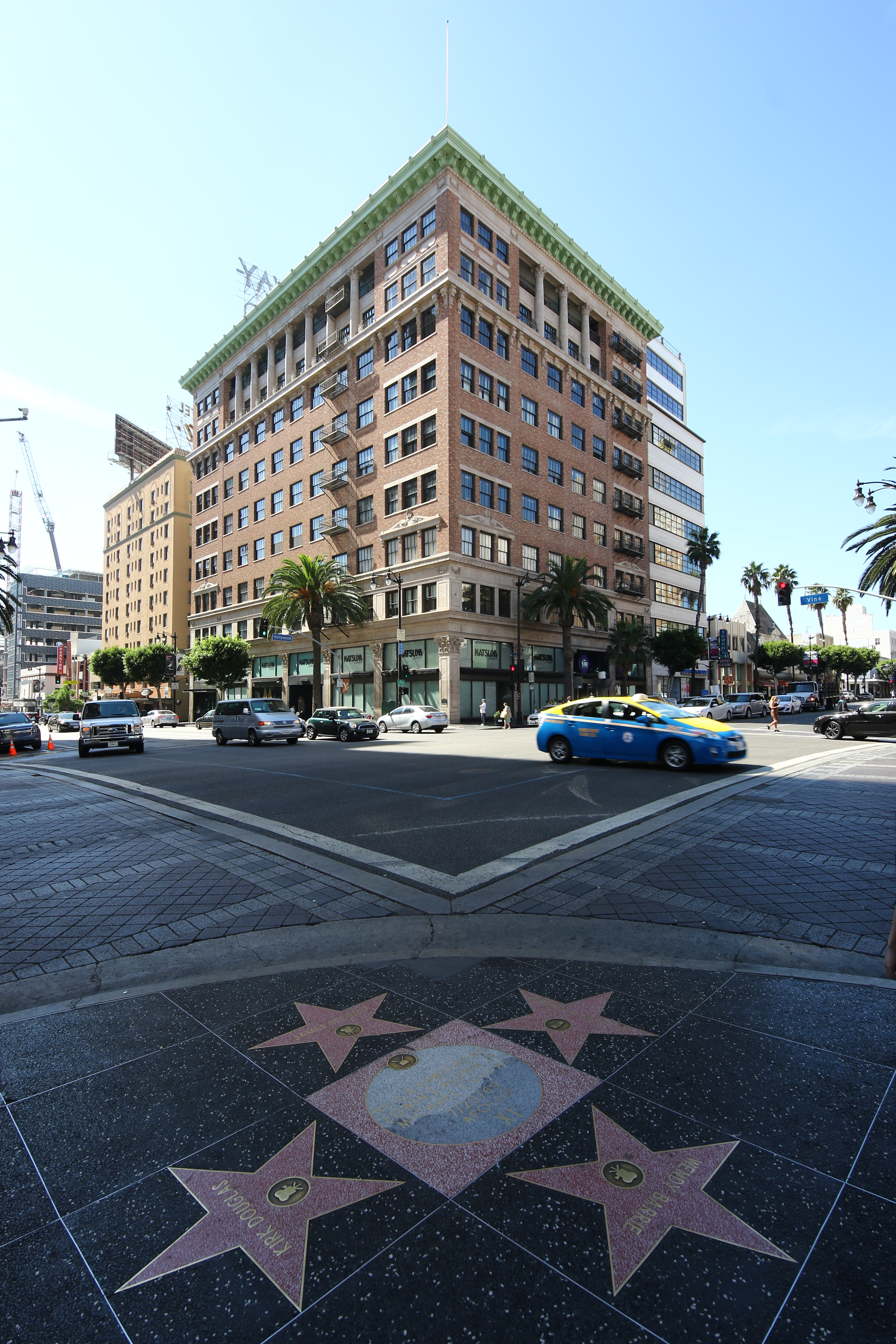
- Dyas (center), Plaza Hotel (left), Hallmark (right), Leed's (far right), and Palmer (far right), viewed from the northeast corner of Hollywood and Vine, 2016

- Location within the Los Angeles metropolitan area Location within California Location within the United States
- Location: 6200–7000 Hollywood Boulevard, Vine Street, Highland Avenue, and Ivar Street in Los Angeles, California
- Coordinates: 34°06′06″N 118°19′58″W
- Area: 56 acres (0.23 km^{2})
- Architect: Multiple
- Architectural style: Primarily: Classical Revival; Spanish Colonial Revival; Art Deco; Also: Châteauesque; Programmatic; Vernacular; Victorian; International
- NRHP reference No.: 85000704
- Added to NRHP: April 4, 1985

The Hollywood Boulevard Commercial and Entertainment District is a historic district that consists of 12 blocks between the 6200 and 7000 blocks of Hollywood Boulevard in Los Angeles, California. This strip of commercial and retail businesses, which includes more than 100 buildings, is recognized for its significance to the entertainment industry, particularly Hollywood and its golden age, and features the predominant architecture styles of the 1920s and 1930s.

Development of the area that would become the Hollywood Boulevard Commercial and Entertainment District began in the 1880s, when several developers recognized the area's potential for entertainment and the arts. The neighborhood was connected by rail to Los Angeles in 1887, Paul de Longpré built its first tourist attraction in 1901, and the entire area was annexed into the City of Los Angeles in 1910.

Most of the Hollywood Boulevard Commercial and Entertainment District was built between 1915 and 1939, during the rapid boom of the film industry. Three commercial centers rose and expanded until they merged into one, with every major film studio, the industry's most significant talent and advertising agencies, numerous theaters and movie palaces, and other entertainment-related businesses and institutions located in the area. Many of Los Angeles's most notable architects designed the buildings that housed these businesses, resulting in a neighborhood filled with significant works, most notably in the Classical Revival, Spanish Colonial Revival, and Art Deco styles.

The neighborhood saw continued success through the 1940s, after which it experienced significant decline. Preservation efforts began in 1980, and in 1985, the entire district including 59 contributing properties were listed in the National Register of Historic Places.

== Description ==
The Hollywood Boulevard Commercial and Entertainment District encompasses 56 acres (0.23 km^{2}), 12 blocks, and more than 100 buildings in Hollywood, California. The area, close in proximity to classic Hollywood's major film studios, contains an array of buildings and businesses that catered to the film industry and is generally known for its significant role in the history of cinema. Furthermore, according to the United States Department of the Interior, the area contains "excellent examples of the predominant architecture styles of the 1920s and 1930s" and it retains the development pattern it developed the 1920s – a mix of high-rise buildings separated by smaller retail structures.

The integrity of the district is fair, as major landmark buildings remain largely untouched and while many smaller buildings have been altered or covered with signage, their upper stories remain largely unaltered. And while the number of contributing properties is less than 60% of the total parcels in the district, it is a significantly higher percentage of the large scale buildings. Other features that add to the historic nature of the district are its colored terrazo entryways, neon signage, the Hollywood Walk of Fame, and its streetlights, the latter of which were developed specifically for the neighborhood.

Overall, the Golden Era of Hollywood is preserved, conveying Hollywood's historic development and its importance in the movie industry – central to modern United States culture.

=== Boundaries ===
The Hollywood Boulevard Commercial and Entertainment District boundaries were defined in 1985 by the United States Department of the Interior based on the area's remaining integrity. They include twelve blocks along Hollywood Boulevard, from 7065 Hollywood Blvd on the west to the northwest corner of Hollywood and Argyle Avenue on the east. However, certain sections were excluded from this area, including the south side of the 6500-block, most of the north side of the 6600-block, the north side of the 6800-block, and the south side of the 7000-block.

Nine parcels just north or south of Hollywood Boulevard were also included in the district, including one on Highland Avenue near Hollywood and Highland, one on Ivar Avenue near Hollywood and Ivar, and seven on Vine Street near Hollywood and Vine.

=== Contributing properties ===
The Hollywood Boulevard Commercial and Entertainment District contains 59 contributing properties. These buildings cover a wide range of purposes, including financial, commercial/mercantile, office, theater, residential, hospitality, food service, institutional, and one medical and another industrial. During the area's construction, real estate syndicates were often beneficiaries of studio profits and therefore became de facto patrons to contemporary Los Angeles's most renowned architects, including Walker & Eisen, John C. Austin, Parkinson & Parkinson, Curlett & Beelman, and Morgan, Walls & Clements. Even more buildings were designed by the exotic and fanciful Gogerty & Weyl and Meyer & Holler, and even more were either designed or redesigned by noted theater architects S. Charles Lee, G. Albert Lansburgh, B. Marcus Priteca, and showman Sid Grauman.

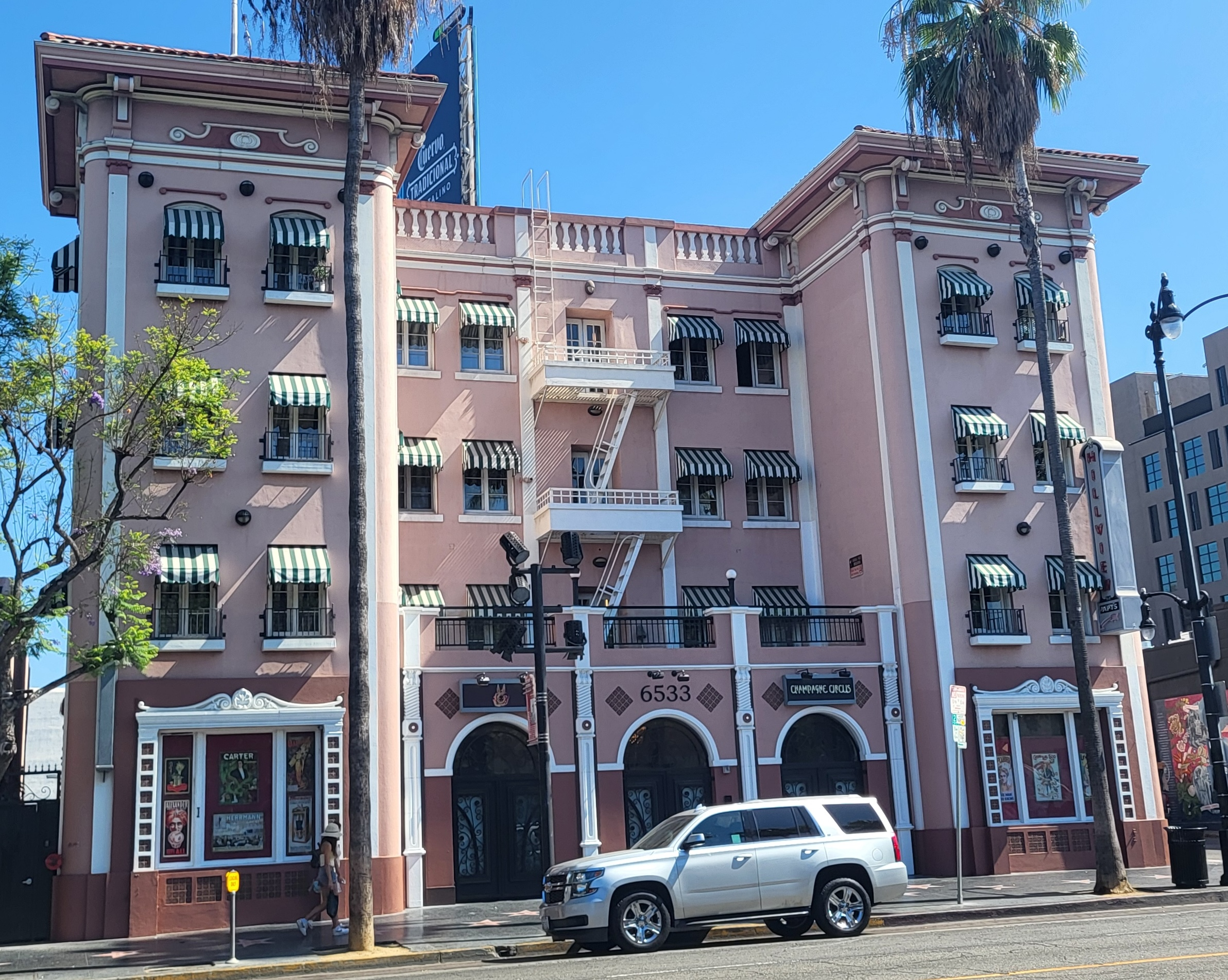
Mediterranean Revival Hillview Apartments, Los Angeles's first artist high-rise, 2024

The majority of the district's contributing properties can be grouped into three styles. Most buildings that housed financial and mercantile institutions were designed in Classical Revival styles, limited by a city ordinance to twelve stories and meant to reflect the prestige of the businesses within. Revival styles featured in the district include Beaux Arts, Georgian, Gothic, Mediterranean, Neoclassical, and Renaissance, with prominent examples that include Hillview Apartments (1917), Security Trust and Savings (1921), Masonic Temple (1921), Taft (1923), Guaranty (1923), Hollywood Professional (1924), and the Christie (1922), Plaza (1924), and Knickerbocker (1929) hotels.

The district also has a significant grouping of Spanish Colonial Revival buildings, ones that feature designs meant to create a feeling of sophisticated and upscale yet relaxed shopping and entertainment. The style, which often features courtyards or other open space and extensive Churrigueresque detailing, was used primarily in the district's low-rise office, retail, service, and entertainment establishments. Prominent examples of this style in the district include Hotel Roosevelt (1924), El Capitan Theatre (1925), and the Baine (1926), Hollywood Toys (1927), and Cherokee (1930) buildings.

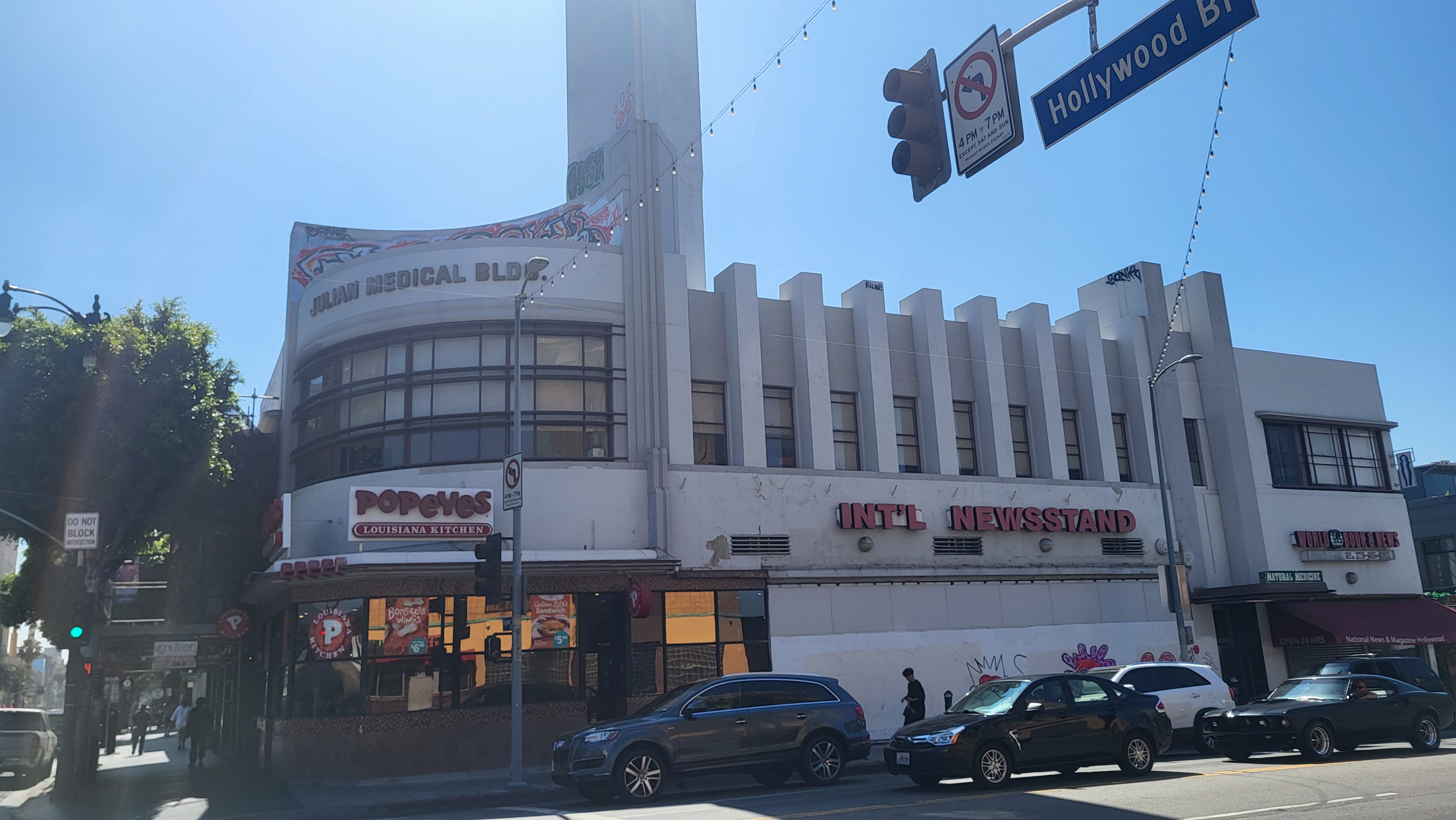
Julian Medical Building, considered "one of the crowning achievements of Streamline Moderne," 2024

The third architectural style embraced by the district was Art Deco. This style, which includes Classic Moderne, Streamline Moderne, Zigzag Moderne, and Hollywood Regency, all of which are featured in the district, created a bold statement that promoted Hollywood Boulevard as the "Style Center of the West." The movie industry and related businesses relished the style's theatricality, and many utilitarian buildings were altered to conform to the look. Prominent examples of this style in the district include J. J. Newberry (1928), Pantages Theater (1930), Max Factor Salon (1931), S. H. Kress (1935), and the 7001 Hollywood Blvd. (1929), Shane (1930), and Julian Medical (1934) buildings.

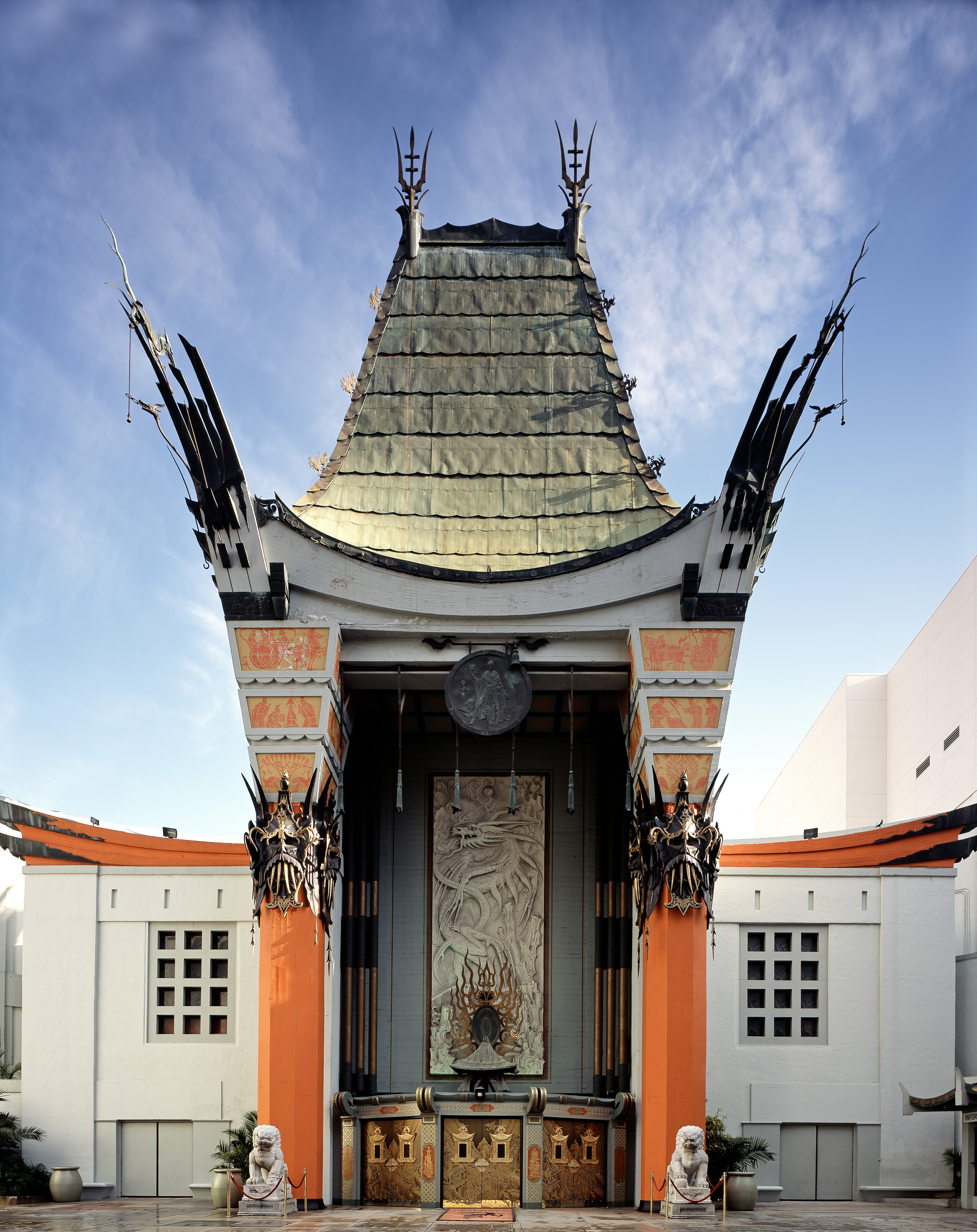
Programmatic Chinese Theater, the most iconic movie palace in Hollywood, 2005

Including and beyond these architectural styles are some of the district's most well known structures: its stage and movie theaters. Featuring a variety of styles and designs, Hollywood's theaters enabled the street to function not just as a business but also an entertainment center. The programmatic Egyptian (1921) and Chinese (1927) as well as the ornate Hollywood (1913, 1933 redesign), El Capitan (1925), Palace (1926), Warner (1927), and Pantages (1930) contributed to the "Hollywood" fantasy for both tourists and locals.

Additionally, the district contains several buildings with designs outside these styles. These include the Victorian Janes Residence (1903); Vernacular Musso & Frank (1917) and Seven Seas (1920); Chateausque Holly Cinema (1920), Hallmark (1922, 1931 redesign), Johnny's Steak House (1930), and demolished Gilbert Books (1932); Parisian Montmartre (1922); and International Leed's (1935).

Finally, the district contains several buildings that combine styles, including Outpost Building (1920), which combines Spanish Colonial Revival and French Regency; Security Pacific (1927) and Equitable Building (1929), which combine Gothic Revival and Art Deco; Dyas Building (1927, 1938 addition), which features Neoclassical and International Style designs; and Pickwick Books (1917/1925/1936), which features Spanish Colonial Revival, Art Deco, and Vernacular designs.

=== Non-contributing properties ===
Most of the district's non-contributing properties are unnamed storefronts, but there are several historic and/or otherwise notable buildings as well. Most notable is Garden Court Apartments (1916), which was to be listed as a contributing property before an attempted demolition damaged the building. Other notable non-contributing properties include Los Angeles Historic Cultural Monument-listed Artisan Patio (1918) as well as Palmer II (1921), Sardi's (1923), Vine Street Theater (1923), Old Post Office (1925), Laemmle Building (1932), and Vogue Theater (1935). Additionally, Woolworth Building, which the listing cites as having been constructed in 1927 while other sources have the building constructed in or around 1908–1910, was also listed as a non-contributing property. Of these buildings, Garden Court Apartments, Laemmle Building, and Old Post Office have been demolished.

=== Unlisted properties ===
The district contains several notable unlisted properties as well. Most are unlisted because they were built after the district was designated, but a few were built before. Most notably, Iris Theatre, while not listed, was mentioned in the listing as one of the theaters that "created an aura of fantasy for the population of the area — and satisfied the tourists in search of "Hollywood" as well." (Note: "Iris Theatre" may refer to Iris Theatre (1914–1918) or Fox Theater (1918–1994), the latter of which was known as Iris Theatre from 1918 to 1968.)

Other notable non-listed properties in the district include Ritz Theatre (1940), Dolby Theatre (2001), Ovation Hollywood (2001), Madame Tussauds Hollywood (2009), and W Hollywood (2010).

== History ==
=== Beginnings ===
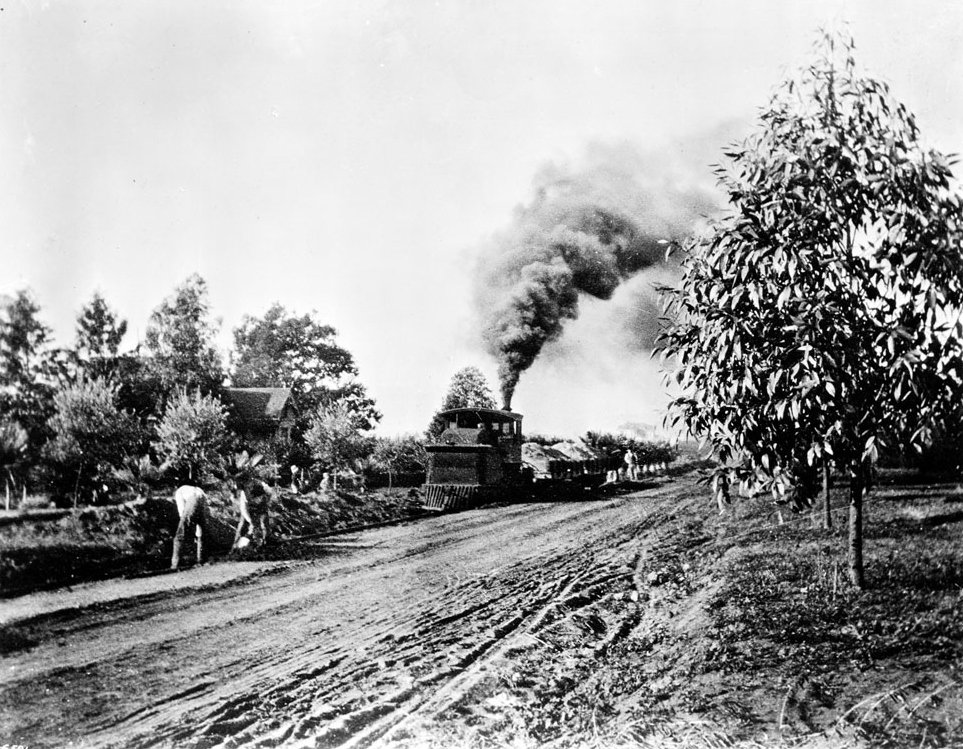
Streetcar tracks being installed on Prospect Avenue (now Hollywood Boulevard), 1898

Hollywood Boulevard was originally named Prospect Avenue by John Bower, a miner from the Sierra foothills, who purchased a small government parcel at the intersection of Pass Road (today's Ivar Avenue) and Prospect in 1872. Harvey Wilcox and Daeida Wilcox Beveridge purchased Bower's tract in the mid-1880s, and Prospect Ave was connected by rail to Los Angeles in 1887 and Laurel Canyon in 1890, with another line connecting the area to Los Angeles, west Los Angeles, and the beach opening in 1901.

By 1901, Prospect was still a small dirt road surrounded by lemon orchards and vegetable fields. The street was lined mostly with houses and also a few establishments, most notably at Prospect and Cahuenga Boulevard, where Paul de Longpré Residence (1901–1927) drew not only Hollywood society, but also property buyers and tourists, and Sackett Hotel (1888-1905) served as the area's first hotel and was also home to its first post office. After 1901, more large establishments were added to the street, including Hollywood Memorial Church (1903–1923) at Prospect and Vine Street, and Hollywood Hotel (1902–1956) at Prospect and Highland Avenue. Janes Residence (1903) was also built during this time.

Hollywood was incorporated in 1903. That same year, the Beveridge family attempted to rename Prospect Avenue after Paul de Longpré, who they and others believed "had done more than any other man to make Southern California...known to the world," but they were not successful as many in the community did not want the street named after a Frenchman. In 1904, the Los Angeles Gas Company installed the city's first gas meters, which allowed for the appearance of street numbers, and in 1910, Los Angeles annexed Hollywood. Then, on January 5, 1910, the Hollywood Board of Trustees officially renamed Prospect Avenue to Hollywood Boulevard.

Two of Hollywood's three major commercial centers began to emerge around this time. The first at Hollywood and Cahuenga was part of the Wilcox/Beveridge ranch and saw the Woolworth and Creque buildings rise in 1910 and 1913, respectively. The second at Hollywood and Highland was developed by H. J. Whitley and Charles E. Toberman, and saw the Bank of America Building rise opposite Hollywood Hotel in 1914.

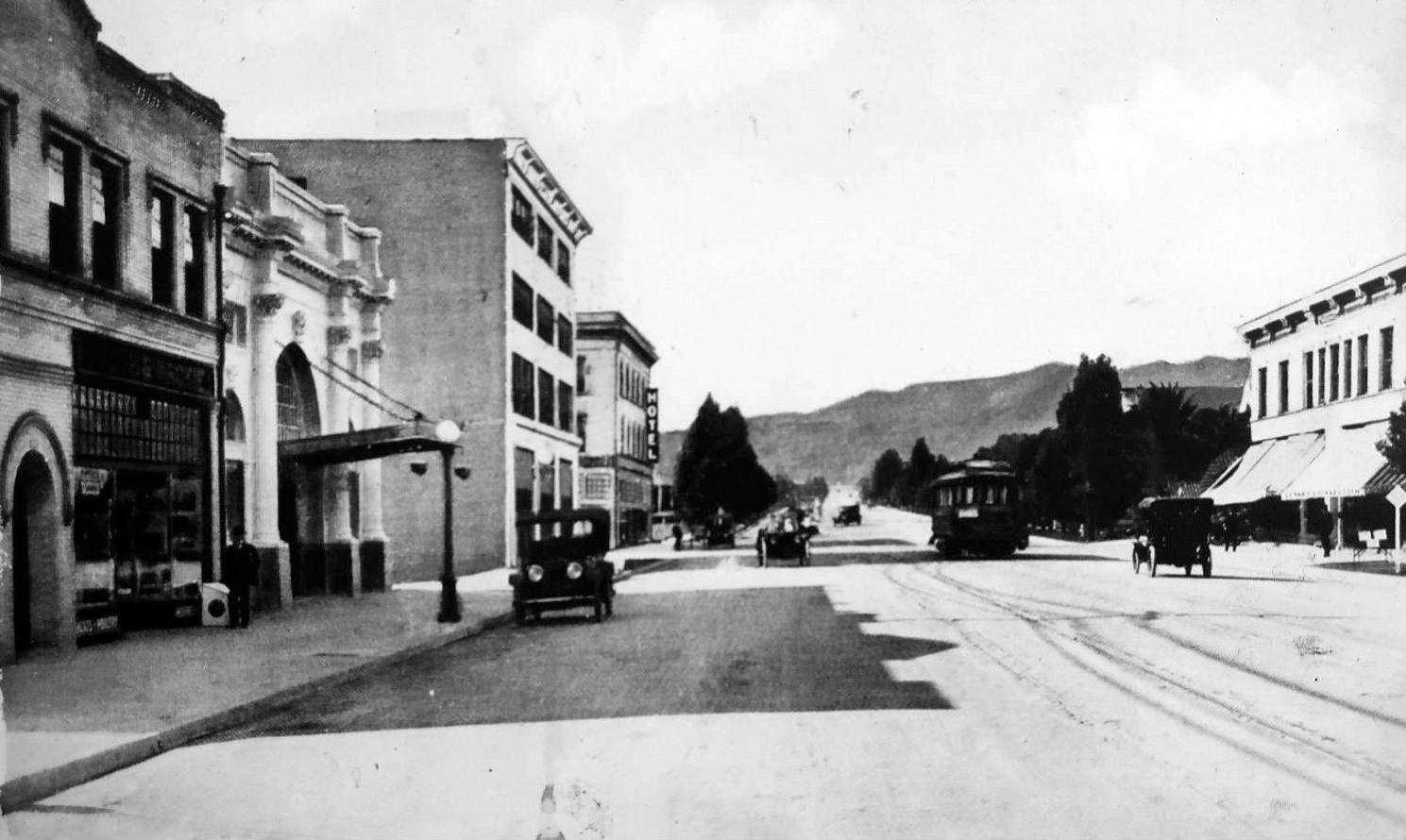
Hollywood Boulevard looking west towards Highland, 1914. Bank of America Building and Hollywood Theater are center-left

Hollywood's first theaters also emerged during this time. Idyl Hour Theater opened at Hollywood and Wilcox in 1910 or 1911, then became Iris Theatre when it moved near Hollywood and Cahuenga in 1914, while Hollywood Theater opened near Hollywood and Highland in 1913 and has remained in its original location ever since, making it making it the oldest theater building still standing in the district.

=== Golden Age ===
Much of Hollywood's historical landmarks were erected between 1915 and 1939, during the rapid boom of the film industry. Those migrating west saw the vast open land in Hollywood as a promising location for studios, and real estate mogul Charles E. Toberman predicted that Hollywood Boulevard would be a mecca for entertainment. He sold vacant land with the promise that "Hollywood is at a threshold of a new era of development."

In 1917, two prominent residential buildings were constructed on Hollywood Boulevard, the luxurious Garden Court Apartments intended for leading members of the film industry, and Hillview Apartments, Hollywood's first artist's high-rise. In 1918, Iris Theatre moved to a new 1000-seat location, and in 1919, Musso & Frank opened; it has since become the oldest restaurant in Hollywood. In 1920, Congregational Church opened, and today it is one of two institutional buildings still standing in the district.

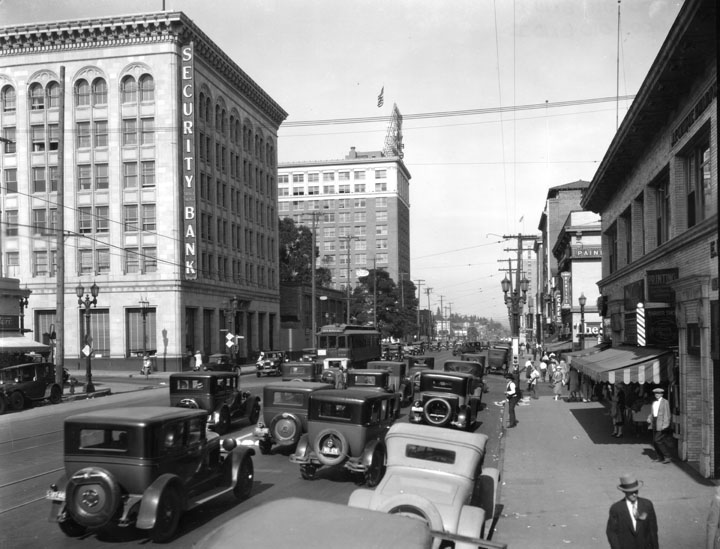
Hollywood Boulevard looking east towards Cahuenga, 1928. Security Trust and Savings is left, Guaranty Building is center, and Creque Building is far-right

The 1920s saw the rise of more buildings along the Boulevard. Around Hollywood and Cahuenga, Palmer Building and Security Trust and Savings were built in 1921, the former home to multiple news organizations while the latter housed a bank that would become "a power center of the entertainment industry," with clients that included Charlie Chaplin, the Three Stooges, Lana Turner, W.C. Fields, Cecil B. DeMille, and Howard Hughes. Guaranty (1923), Knickerbocker (1925), Studio Theatre (1920), and Warner Theatre (1927) also opened near this intersection during this time.

The most notable developments near Hollywood and Highland were the Egyptian (1922), site of the world's first movie premiere, and Chinese (1927), home to Hollywood's famous celebrity handprints and footprints. Along with these was El Capitan playhouse, which opened in 1926 and was converted to a movie palace in 1942, and Hollywood Masonic Temple, built in 1921 and the second of two institutional buildings that remain in the district. Other notable buildings built in this area during this time were Christie Hotel (1922), Hotel Roosevelt (1927), and Security Pacific (1927). Notable food and drink establishments that opened in this area include Café Montmartre (1923), Pig 'n Whistle (1927), Embassy Club (1929), and C.C. Brown's (1929), although Café Montmartre and Embassy Club both closed less than ten years later.

Hollywood Boulevard looking east towards Vine, 1928. Dyas Building is right, Taft Building is center, and lots for the Hollywood Pantages and Equitable Building are far left

The 1920s also saw the emergence of Hollywood's third major commercial center at Hollywood and Vine. Commercial development of this intersection began in 1923, when Taft Building replaced Hollywood Memorial Church and became the first high-rise office building in Los Angeles, one that housed the Academy of Motion Picture Arts and Sciences and every movie studio in the city. Plaza Hotel (1924), Dyas Building (1928), and Equitable Building (1929) rose soon after, as did this area's movie palace, Pantages Theater (1930), and playhouses, Vine Street Theater (1927) and Palace Theatre (1927). Notable food and drink establishments that opened in this area include Hollywood Brown Derby (1929) and Frolic Room (1930), and Satyr Book Shop (1926) opened here as well.

Additional notable buildings built in the district in the 1920s include Hollywood Professional (1924), Hollywood Studio (1927), Security Trust (1928), J. J. Newberry (1928), Cherokee (1929), and Shane (1930). This decade saw so much development that Hollywood's three commercial centers merged into one, resulting in a pedestrian-oriented neighborhood that featured architectural monuments separated by smaller commercial buildings.

Hollywood's investors were hit hard by the stock market crash of 1929, causing many retail operations to go out of business. Additionally, several plans for future developments were abandoned. However, the film industry continued to attract tourists and aspiring actors, and the 1930s saw S. Charles Lee restyle much of Hollywood, as well as new constructions that included Julian Medical (1934), considered a Streamline Moderne masterpiece, and Max Factor Salon (1931), whose Hollywood Regency design was emblematic of the theatrical style Hollywood was known for. Several notable businesses opened in the district in the 1930s, including Seven Seas (mid-1930s), Vogue Theatre (1935), Admiral Theatre (1940), and two of Hollywood's most notable bookshops: Stanley Rose (c. 1931) and Pickwick (1938). Radio City (1938) also opened just outside the district at Vine Street and Sunset Boulevard.

=== Continued success ===
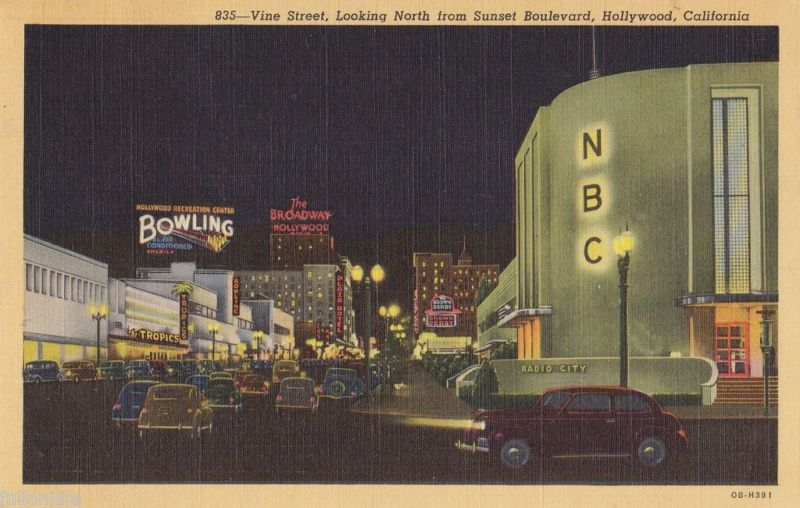
Postcard of Radio City with Plaza Hotel, Dyas Building, Hollywood Brown Derby, Taft Building, and Equitable Building in the background, 1946

Despite an end to the district's construction boom, the area experienced continued success through the 1940s. Nearby Radio City brought many radio performers to the district, particularly to Hollywood and Vine and its Equitable Building and Plaza Hotel, the former home to numerous talent and advertising agencies, the latter popular with the performers themselves. The nearby Knickerbocker Hotel also retained its popularity with celebrities, while Palace Theatre rebranded itself El Capitan Theatre and began broadcasting CBS radio shows as well as hosting burlesque.

At Hollywood and Cahuenga, the Associated Press's Los Angeles bureau joined the Hollywood Citizen in Palmer Building in 1940, making that location an even more significant news site than it already was. Further west, Frederick's of Hollywood made S. H. Kress their flagship location in 1947, and Hollywood Toys & Costumes moved into Hollywood Studio Building in 1950, where it would remain for 40+ years before moving one building west.

Closer to Hollywood and Highland, Musso and Frank served writers such as F. Scott Fitzgerald, Nathaniel West, Ernest Hemingway, William Faulkner, and Dorothy Parker in their exclusive back room, where they would drink, write, and wait to see if any deals materialized at the Writers Guild across the street. Also across the street, News View Theatre opened in 1940, Boardner's opened in 1944, and Pig 'n Whistle closed in 1949, its furnishings relocated to nearby Miceli's, which opened the same year. Snow White Cafe also opened in nearby Christie Realty Building in 1946.

Hollywood's movie palaces underwent significant changes in the 1940s. In 1942, Paramount Studios converted El Capitan from a playhouse to a movie palace, renaming it Paramount Theatre while doing so, and in 1944, MGM took over programming at the Egyptian. However, all programming and ownership changed in 1949, when the United States Supreme Court issued the Paramount Decree, banning movie studios from owning or otherwise programming movie theaters. As a result, spin-off company United Paramount Theatres operated El Capitan while United Artists took over programming at the Egyptian. Similarly, spin-off company Stanley Warner Theatres operated Warner Theater and Howard Hughes bought Pantages Theater.

The 1950s saw more success in the district, but also decline. The Knickerbocker and Plaza hotels remained popular destinations, but Hollywood Hotel and Hotel Roosevelt had become run down, with the former razed in 1956 and replaced by a shopping center, parking lots, and the 12 story First Federal Savings and Loan Building. Garden Court Apartments also began to decline during this time.

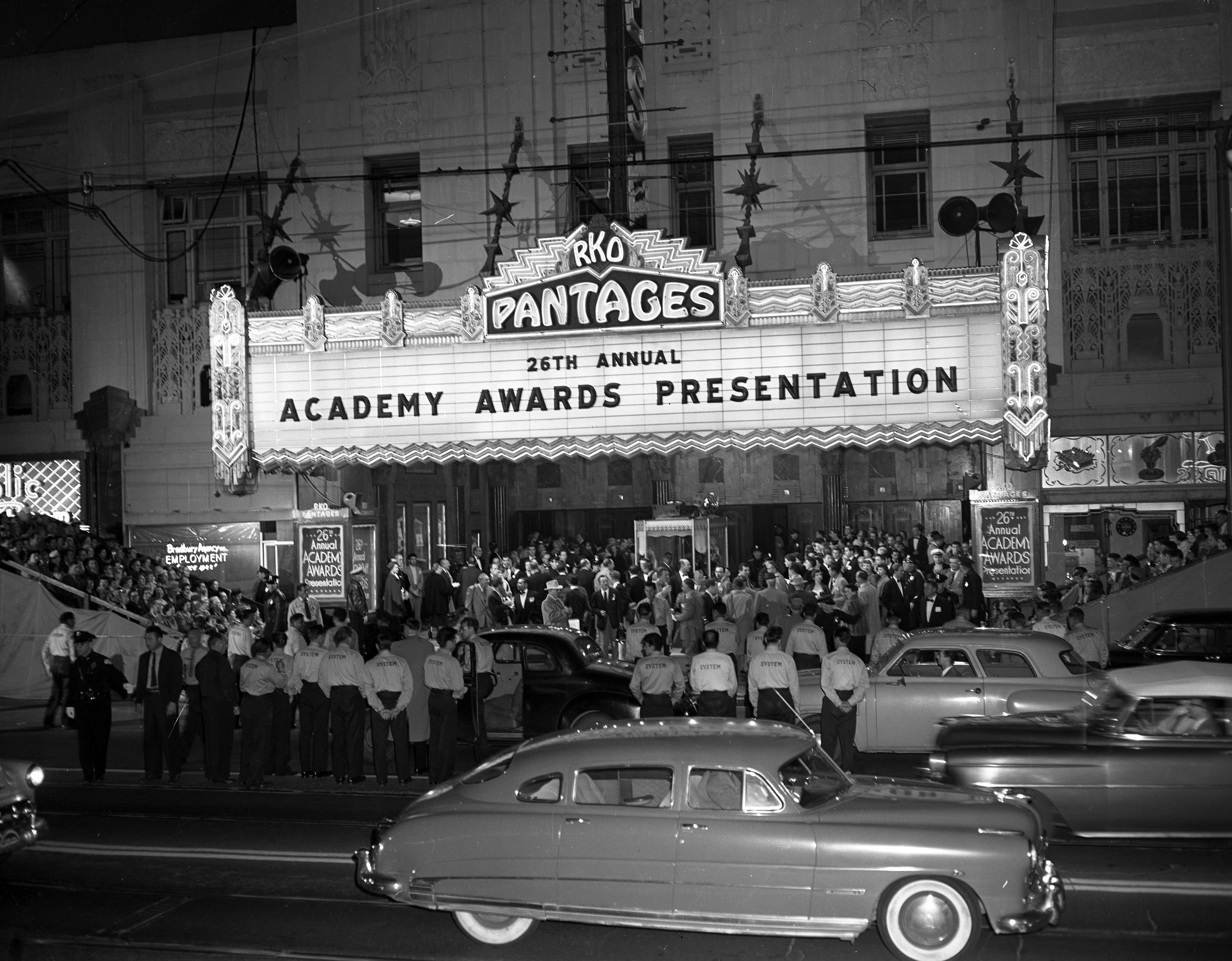
26th annual Academy Awards at Pantages Theater, 1954

Elsewhere in the district, the 1950s saw Equitable Building undergo a street level remodel, Warner Theatre upgraded to cinerama, the Egyptian upgraded to Todd AO, Vogue Theatre undergo a $250,000 renovation, News View Theatre renamed New View Theater as it switched from newsreels to features, Pantages Theater host every Academy Award ceremony, and Palace Theatre convert to a television studio, where in 1952 Richard Nixon gave his famous Checkers speech. Additionally, Larry Edmunds Bookshop moved into the district in 1955 and Capitol Records Building was completed just outside the district the following year, as was the Cinerama Dome in 1963.

In 1960, the Hollywood Walk of Fame was unveiled across the entire district. The project, in the works since 1953, was meant to “maintain the glory of a community whose name means glamour and excitement in the four corners of the world.” New street lighting and trees were also included in the project.

=== Decline ===
Like much of Los Angeles, Hollywood saw significant decline in the 1960s and 70s. Radio City, a major source of Hollywood and Vine's success, was demolished in 1964, and the surrounding area deteriorated soon after. The Knickerbocker closed as a hotel and reopened as senior housing in 1970. Likewise, Plaza Hotel went derelict and was converted to an apartment complex in 1972. Equitable Building fared somewhat better, undergoing a $1 million renovation in 1969, after which nearby Capitol Records occupied 44,500 square feet (4,130 m^{2}) of office space on the third through eighth floors. But despite this, the building also experienced high vagrancy and decline.

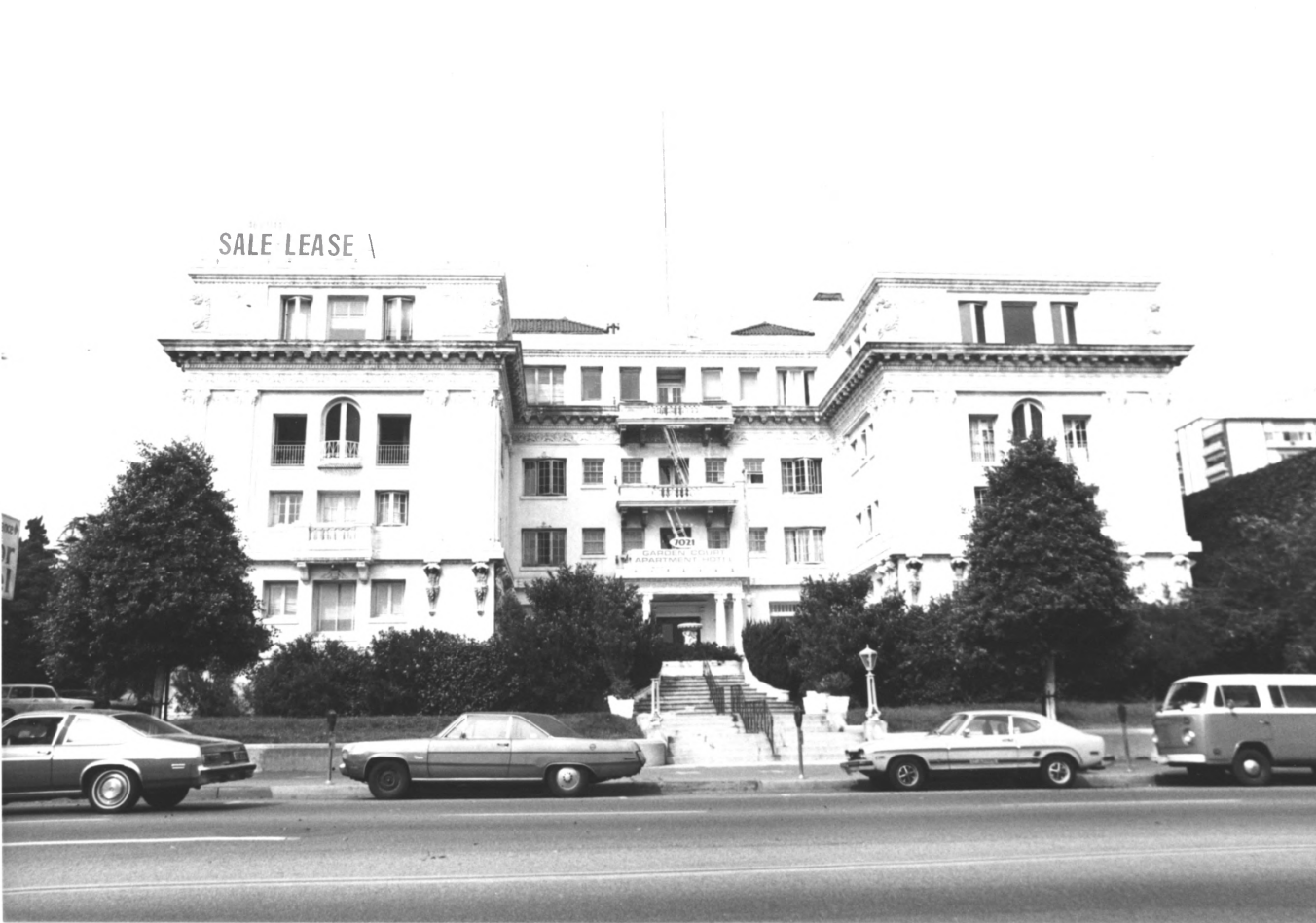
Garden Court Apartments, nicknamed "Hotel Hell," 1980

Elsewhere in the district, Hollywood Wax Museum opened in the Christie Realty Building in 1965, Seven Seas closed c. 1970, Masonic Temple began leasing out its ground floor in the 1970s and was sold altogether in 1982, the Church of Scientology bought Christie Hotel in 1974, Shane Building housed The Masque on-and-off from 1977 to 1979, and Garden Court Apartments was vacated in 1980, after which it was inhabited by squatters and nicknamed "Hotel Hell."

The district's theaters also underwent significant change during this time. Pacific Theatres bought Pantages Theater in 1967 and ten years later they partnered with Nederlander Organization to reopen the movie palace as a playhouse. Pacific Theatres also bought Warner Theatre in 1968, at which point they renamed it Hollywood Pacific Theatre, and in 1978 they converted the theater into three theaters and that they named Pacific 1-2-3. Pacific Theatres also bought New View Theater in 1968 and Vine Theatre in the 1970s, and converted the latter to a Spanish language theater and a two-dollar grindhouse.

Mann's Chinese Theatre, 1977

Outside Pacific Theatres, Fox Theatres bought Iris Theatre in 1965 and renamed it Fox Theater, Mann Theatres bought the Chinese in 1973 and renamed it Mann's Chinese, Pussycat Theaters bought New View Theatre in 1974 and renamed it Pussycat Theater, Hollywood Theatre was renovated in 1977, and Palace Theatre was converted to a concert venue and nightclub in 1978.

=== Preservation ===
In 1980, Hollywood Heritage was formed to identify and save historic structures in Hollywood. Within the next five years, four buildings in the district were listed either as Los Angeles Historic-Cultural Monuments (LAHCM), in the National Register of Historic Places (NRHP), or both:

- Janes House (LAHCM No. 227, April 30, 1980)
- Garden Court Apartments (LAHCM No. 243, April 28, 1981)
- Security Trust and Savings (NRHP No. 83001204, August 18, 1983)
- Hollywood Masonic Temple (LAHCM No. 277, June 12, 1984) (NRHP No. 85000355, February 28, 1985)

In addition to the above, three buildings and the Hollywood Walk of Fame had already been listed before Hollywood Heritage was formed:

- Grauman's Chinese Theatre (LAHCM No. 55, June 5, 1968)
- Hollywood Pantages Theatre (LAHCM No. 193, July 5, 1978)
- Hollywood Walk of Fame (LAHCM No. 194, July 5, 1978)
- Guaranty Building (NRHP No. 79000481, September 4, 1979)

On April 4, 1985, the Hollywood Boulevard Commercial and Entertainment District was added to the National Register of Historic Places, with 59 contributing properties listed in the district. Many of these have also been designated Los Angeles Historic-Cultural Monuments in the years since, as has William Stromberg Clock, Raymond Chandler Square, and non-contributing Artisan's Patio Complex, all located in the district. Garden Court Apartments was initially considered as a contributing property but ultimately was not listed due to the state of the building, which at the time was badly damaged by an attempted demolition.

=== Continued decline ===
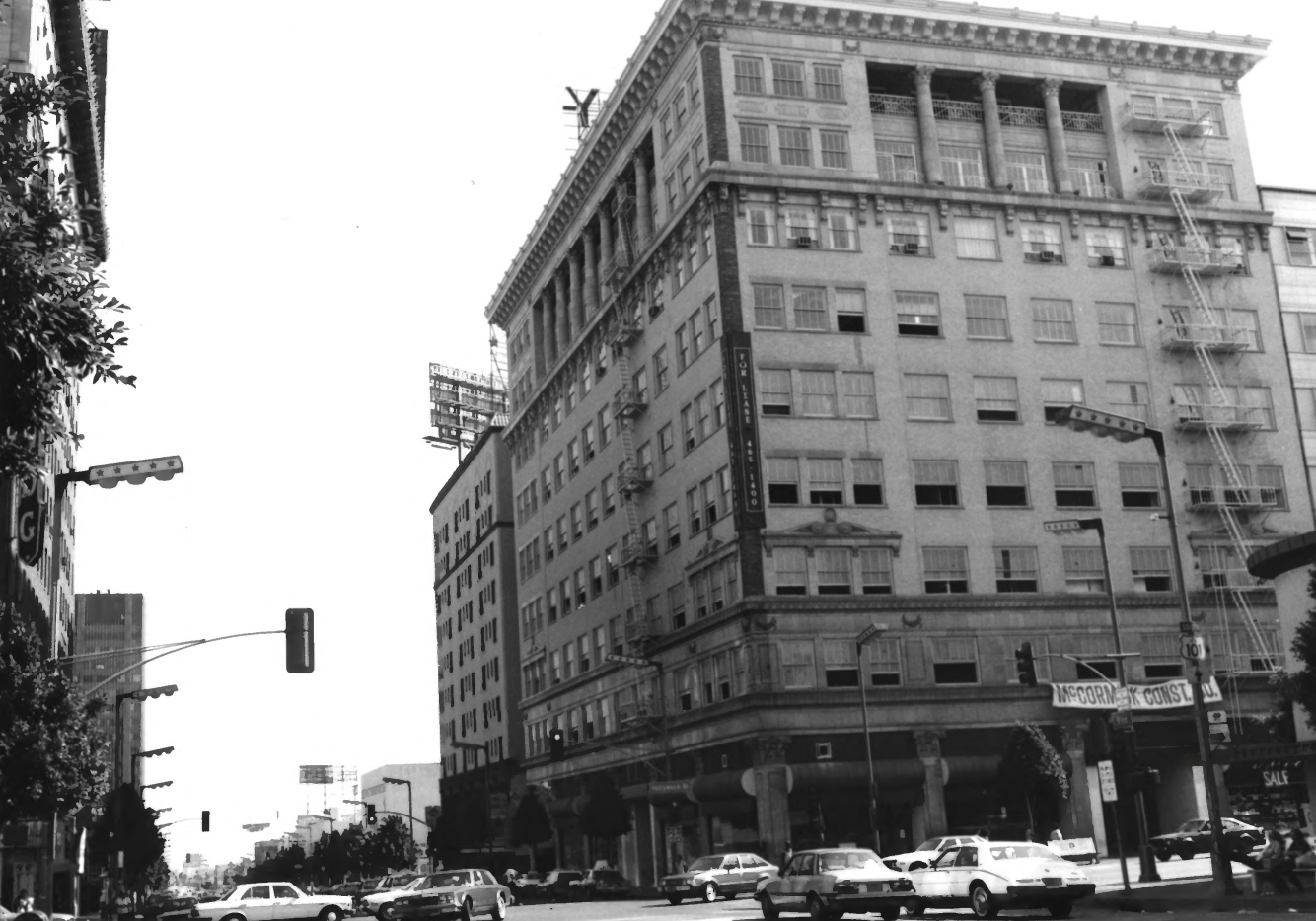
Dyas Building, Plaza Hotel behind it, 1984

Despite the district's historic designation, it experienced continued decline throughout the 1980s and into the 90s. Garden Court Apartments was demolished in 1984, this despite it being listed as a Los Angeles Historic-Cultural Monument. Hollywood Brown Derby closed in 1985 and two years later the building was gutted by fire, then further damaged by squatters. Dyas Building lost its primary tenant in 1982 and Millers Stationers moved out of its building in 1986, citing crime and vagrancy in the area. Max Factor also moved out of its salon, the building then turned into a museum that closed in 1996.

On the theater front, Studio Theatre, which had been renamed Holly Cinema, closed in 1986; Pussycat Theater, which had become Ritz Theatre, closed in 1991; Hollywood Theater shut down in 1992; and even the prestigious Egyptian shut down in 1992, after which it fell into disrepair.

The 1994 Northridge earthquake caused even more damage to the district. Worst hit was Hollywood Brown Derby, which was condemned after the earthquake and demolished soon after. Additionally, both Warner Theatre and Hillview Apartments closed in 1994 due to a combination of earthquake damage and damage caused by B Line construction. Fox Theater also closed in 1994 due to earthquake damage, while Vogue Theatre closed in 1995 and C.C. Brown's closed in 1996.

The district did experience some successes during this time. In 1986, Janes Residence reopened as an information center with a 14,000 square feet (1,300 m^{2}) mini-mall in front, this despite the NRHP listing describing the Janes Residence interior as dilapidated two years prior. In 1985, Hotel Roosevelt underwent a $35 million ($105 million in 2025) renovation, and in 1989, after the Paramount Decree was relaxed, the Walt Disney Company bought El Capitan, at which point the theater underwent a $14 million ($36.4 million in 2025) renovation and reopened in 1991 as the studio's flagship. El Capitan underwent another $10 million ($21.1 million in 2025) renovation in 1995, this one to repair damage caused by the Northridge earthquake. Finally, several museums opened in the district during this period, including Frederick's of Hollywood's Celebrity Lingerie Hall of Fame in S. H. Kress in 1986, Ripley's Believe It or Not! Odditorium in the Bank of America Building in 1992, and Guinness World of Records Museum in Hollywood Theater in 1994.

The Church of Scientology also bought three buildings in the district during this time: Guaranty in 1988 and Congregational Church and Security Trust in 1995.

=== Revitalization ===
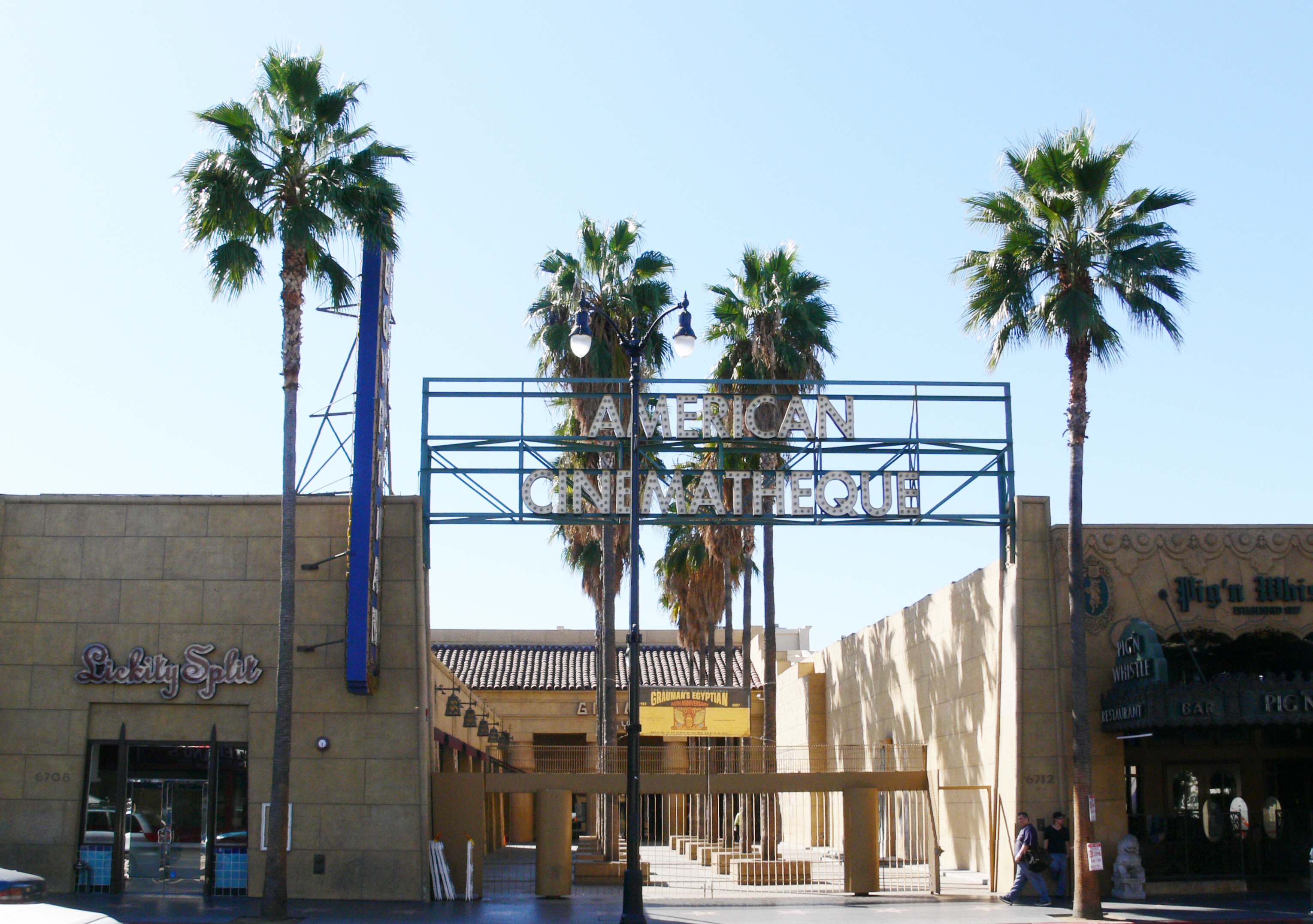
The American Cinematheque renovated Egyptian Theatre, 2008

The district's fortunes began to change in the late 1990s. In 1996, the American Cinematheque bought the Egyptian for a nominal $1, with the provision that the building be restored to its original grandeur and reopened as a movie theater. The Cinematheque raised $12.8 million ($25.7 million in 2025) to pay for the restoration, which included the addition of palm trees in the forecourt and a second theater in the building. The theater reopened to the public on December 4, 1998. Next door Pig 'n Whistle was renovated soon after, and re-opened in 1999.

Equitable Building was also rehabilitated between 1999 and 2001, iO West moved into the district in 2000, and the district was connected to the Los Angeles Metro during this time, with a B Line stop at Hollywood and Vine opening in 1999 and another at Hollywood and Highland opening in 2000.

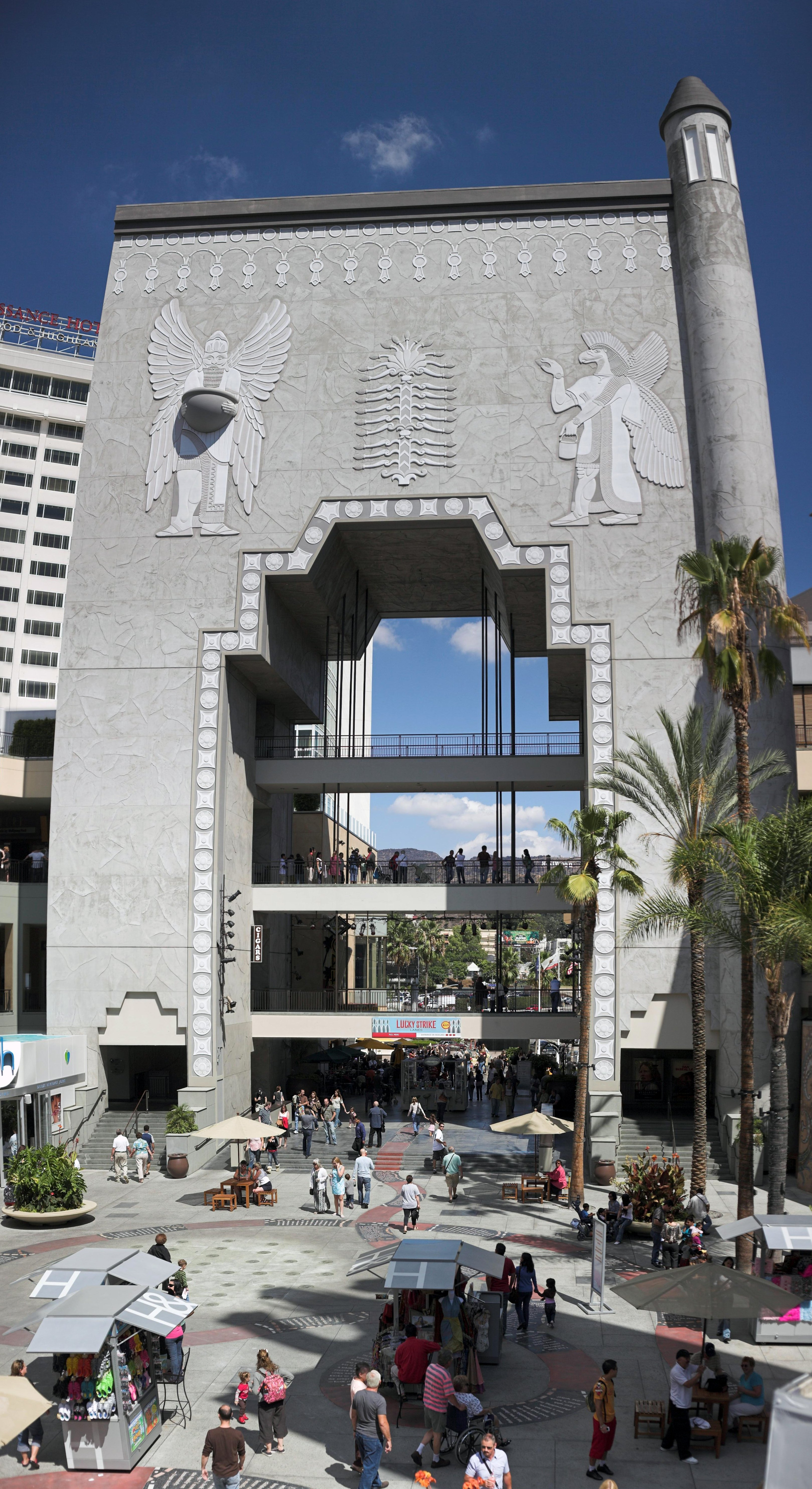
Babylon courtyard at the Hollywood and Highland Center, 2007

The centerpiece of the revitalization effort, however, was the $430 million ($782 million in 2025) Hollywood and Highland Center. This construction, which took the place of the First Federal Savings and Loan Building on the site of the former Hollywood Hotel, featured 640,000 square feet (59,000 m^{2}) of commercial space around a Babylonian themed courtyard, six levels of underground parking, and the 179,000 square feet (16,600 m^{2}), 3,600-seat Kodak Theatre, the new home of the Academy Awards. The project, completed in 2001, was meant to encourage development and revitalization throughout Hollywood.

The district saw numerous renovations both during and after Hollywood and Highland Center construction. The neighboring Chinese Theatre underwent a $5 million ($9.09 million in 2025) restoration and modernization while the Hollywood and Highland Center was built, and a Chinese-themed six-plex was added to the Center to connect it to the theater. Across the street, the Walt Disney Company renovated their recently acquired Masonic Temple in 2002 and Hotel Roosevelt underwent a $30 million renovation in 2005 ($49.5 million in 2025). Nearby, a Mel's Drive-In opened in Max Factor Salon's one-story wing in 2001, while the Hollywood Museum took over the rest of the building in 2002.

Hollywood and Vine saw its own large-scale development: the $600 million ($886 million in 2025) W Hollywood Hotel and Residences, which opened in 2010. Gilbert Books was demolished to make way for this project, while Stores (1632 N. Vine St.) survived multiple eminent domain attempts and was not.

Elsewhere in the district, Shane Building was converted to production offices in 2000, Dyas Building to condominiums in 2005, Janes Residence to a restaurant in 2006, Hollywood Professional to apartments and Equitable to condominiums in 2007, and Fox Theater to a lounge/nightclub in 2009. Similarly, Hillview Apartments was renovated and reopened in 2006, and the district's streetlights were renovated that same year.

Renovations and revitalizations continued throughout the 2010s. In 2013, the Chinese was converted to IMAX and Janes Residence to a speakeasy, in 2015, Vine Theatre was converted to a Dolby showcase theater and Hotel Roosevelt underwent another $25 million renovation, and in 2021, Hillview Apartments was restored and Musso & Frank expanded for the first time in 66 years. Furthermore, Kodak Theatre was renamed Dolby Theatre in 2012, a pedestrian scramble was added to Hollywood and Highland in 2015 and Hollywood and Vine in 2018, a bike hub was added at Hollywood and Vine in 2017, "ALL BLACK LIVES MATTER" was painted down the median of Hollywood Boulevard west of Highland Avenue in 2020, and Amoeba Music relocated into the district in 2021.

It was not all successes during this time. Frederick's of Hollywood vacated S. H. Kress in 2005, after which the building underwent a $30 million ($44.9 million in 2025) renovation, re-opening in 2008 as a multi-use dining and entertainment venue that would go vacant three years later. Security Pacific also went vacant in 2008, iO West ceased operations and Palmer Building was condemned in 2018, and several businesses were unable to survive the COVID-19 lockdowns, including Fox Theater's new lounge/nightclub and the Pig 'n Whistle, the latter of which was gutted and turned into a cantina that would close a few years later.

=== Today ===
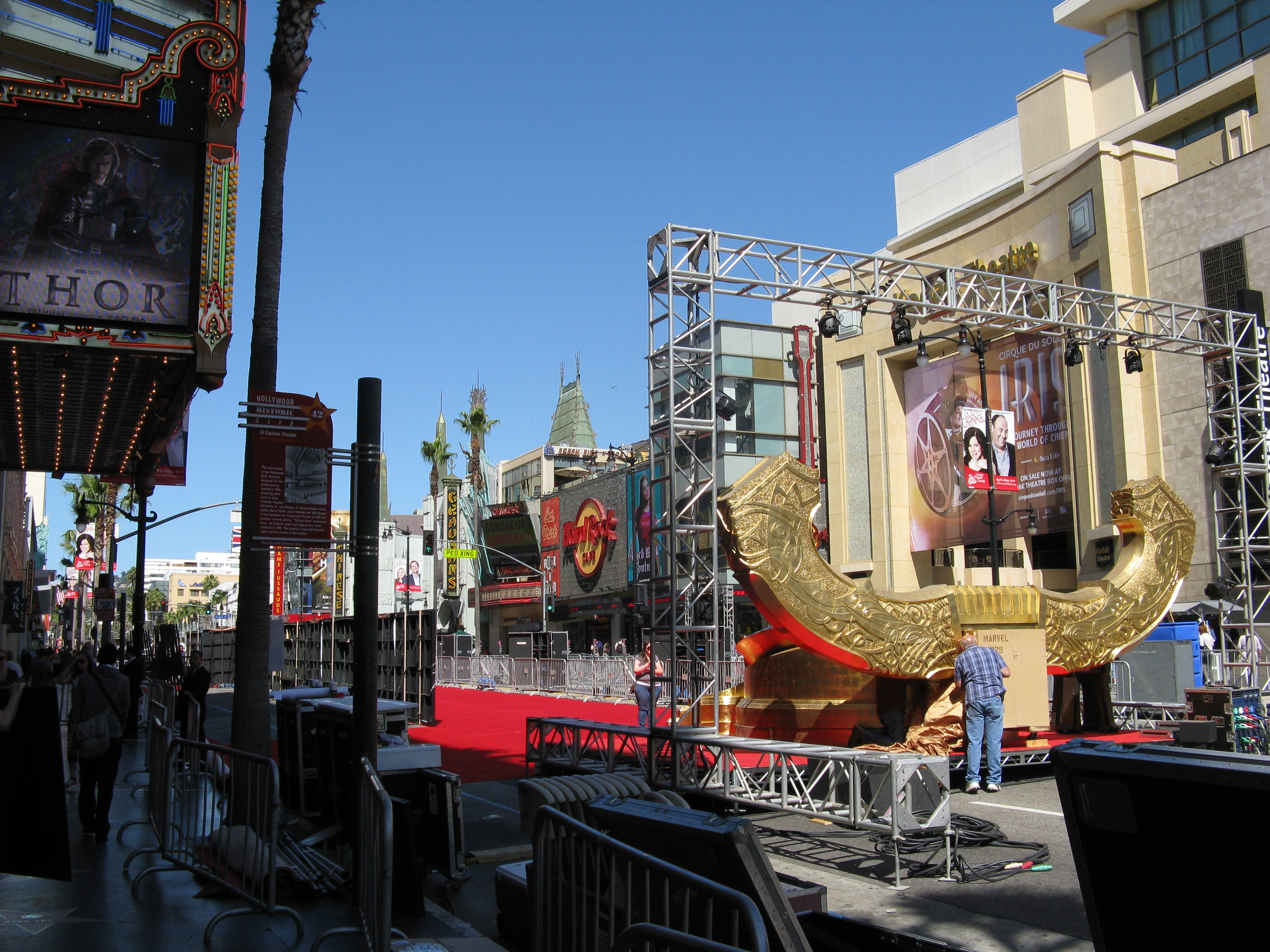
Preparations for the Thor premiere on Hollywood Boulevard, 2011

The Hollywood Boulevard Commercial and Entertainment District remains a focal point for the film, entertainment, and tourism industries in Los Angeles. Numerous films hold their world premieres in the district, commonly at the Chinese or in the case of Disney, the El Capitan, with the larger premieres often shutting down Hollywood Boulevard outside the theaters. The Academy Awards are held at Dolby Theatre every year (also with street closures), Jimmy Kimmel Live shoots daily at Hollywood Masonic Temple, and Pantages Theater has become one of the most prestigious theater venues in Los Angeles. Musso & Frank, Frolic Room, Boardner's, Larry Edmunds Bookshop, Hollywood Toys & Costumes, Amoeba Records, and numerous other establishments continue to do business in the district, as do a multitude of museums that moved in over the years. The Walk of Fame unveils an average of two new stars every month, each accompanied by a media event, and hand and footprints continue to be added to the Chinese forecourt.

Renovation and revitalization of the district is ongoing. 2022 saw the Hollywood and Highland Center rebranded Ovation Hollywood, with all Babylonian theming removed; 2023 saw another renovation at the Egyptian, this one by its new owner Netflix, who amongst other alterations removed every aesthetic addition received over the years, effectively bringing the theater back to its original form; and 2024 saw the abrupt closure of Snow White Cafe.

Other renovations that have been announced but not yet taken place include preserving Security Trust and Savings and converting Palmer Building into a hotel. Furthermore, Los Angeles Metro plans to connect the K Line to the district and the City of Los Angeles has proposed a comprehensive renovation of the district's entire streetscape, with changes that include: adding sidewalk dining, event plazas, and community gathering spaces; improving landscaping, lighting, signage, and mobility access; doubling pedestrian space; and restoring the Walk of Fame. Advocates have also proposed converting Hollywood Boulevard from Highland to La Brea to a pedestrian zone similar to Third Street Promenade, Fremont Street, Market Street, and Times Square; however, this was not part of the city's plans as of 2020.

== See also ==
- Cinema of the United States
- Hollywood Boulevard
- Hollywood Chamber of Commerce
- Hollywood Walk of Fame
- Hollywood, Los Angeles
