= Seven seas (disambiguation) =

"Seven Seas" is a phrase used to encompass all the world's oceans in general.

Seven seas may also refer to:

== Companies and brands ==
- Seven Seas Entertainment, an American publisher of manga and light novels
- Seven Seas (company), a UK vitamin brand owned by Merck KGaA (now by P&G)
- Seven Seas, a sublabel of Japanese record company King Records
- Regent Seven Seas Cruises, a luxury cruise line

== Transportation ==
- Douglas DC-7C "Seven Seas", an extended-range variant of the DC-7 aircraft
- USS Long Island (CVE-1), a passenger liner renamed Seven Seas

== Music ==
- Seven Seas (album), a 2005 compilation album by Echo & the Bunnymen
- Seven Seas, a 2011 album by Avishai Cohen
- Seven Seas, a 2015 album by Emancipator
- "Seven Seas" (song), a song by Echo & the Bunnymen, 1984
- "Seven Seas", a song by TNT, 1984

== Other ==
- Seven Seas Marine Life Park, a defunct animal theme park in Arlington, Texas
- Seven Seas Residence, former residence of Republic of China President Chiang Ching-kuo
- Seven Seas Salad Dressing, a Kraft-owned line of salad dressing
- The Seven Seas (poetry collection), a volume of poetry by Rudyard Kipling
- Seven Seas Lagoon, an artificial lake in Walt Disney World
- A former restaurant and nightclub in Los Angeles, California, with the building that housed it often referred to by the same name

== See also ==
- The Seven Sealands, jurisdictional regions of medieval Frisia
- Sinbad: Legend of the Seven Seas, a 2003 animated film
- 7th Sea (collectible card game)
