= Security Trust =

Building in Los Angeles, California

- U.S. Historic district – Contributing property
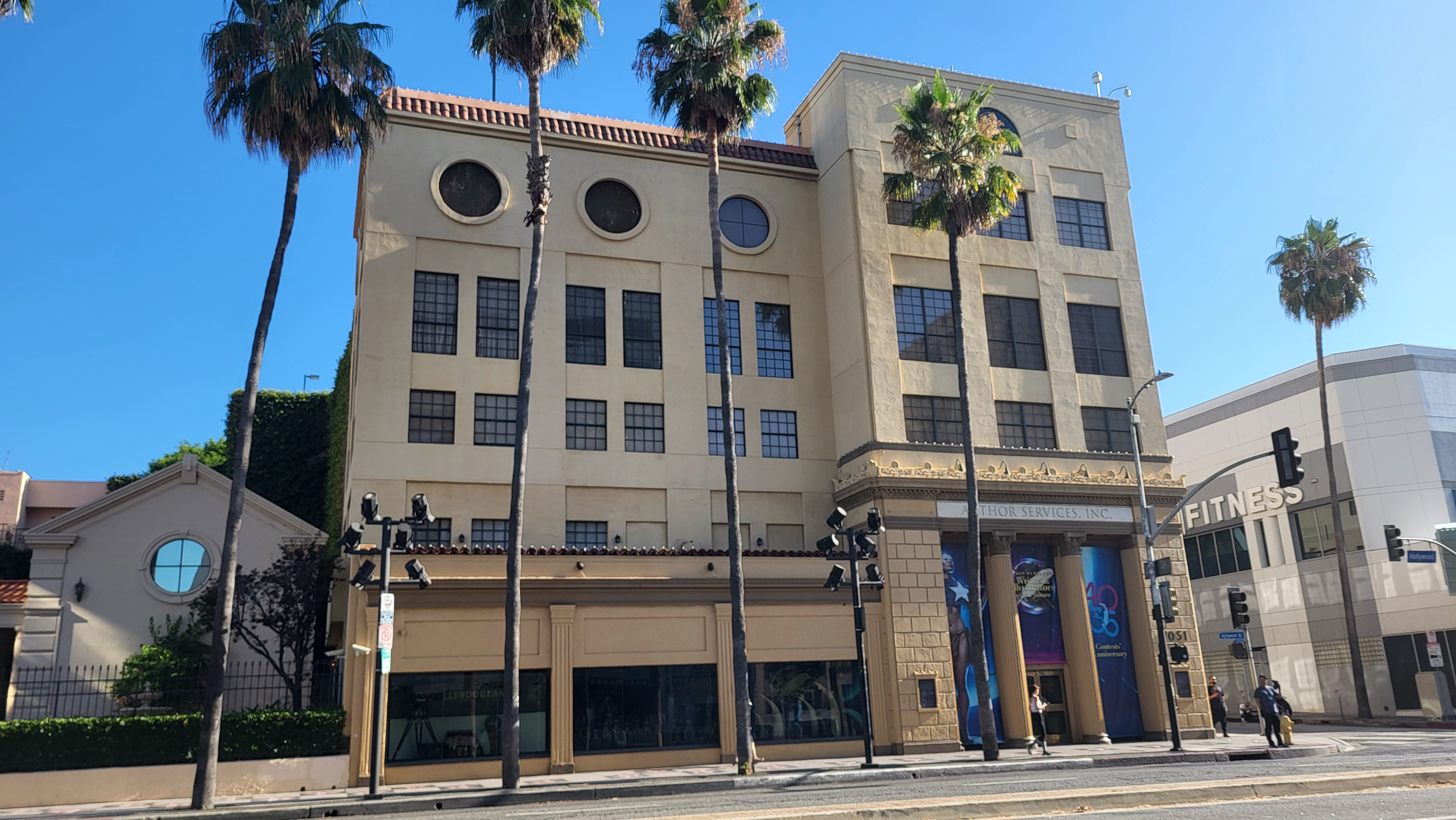
- The building in 2024

- Location within the Los Angeles metropolitan area
- Location: 7051-7055 W. Hollywood Blvd., Los Angeles, California
- Coordinates: 34.1017°N 118.3435°W
- Built: 1928
- Architect: John and Donald Parkinson
- Architectural style: Beaux-Arts
- Part of: Hollywood Boulevard Commercial and Entertainment District (ID85000704)
- Designated CP: April 4, 1985

Security Trust, also known as Hollywood Savings and Loan, is a historic bank building with attached retail storefronts located at 7051-7055 W Hollywood Blvd., on the corner of Hollywood Boulevard and Sycamore Avenue, in Hollywood, California. Originally a bank building with attached storefronts, the building is currently owned by the Church of Scientology. The building and its attached storefronts are listed as separate contributing properties in the Hollywood Boulevard Commercial and Entertainment District.

== History ==
Security Trust was built in 1928 by John and Donald Parkinson, the duo responsible for some of Los Angeles's most notable landmarks, including Union Station and the Memorial Coliseum. The building originally housed a branch of Security Trust and Savings. Hollywood Building and Loan Association moved into the building and made it their headquarters in 1939; the company later became Hollywood Savings and Loan.

In 1985, the Hollywood Boulevard Commercial and Entertainment District was added to the National Register of Historic Places, with Security Trust and its attached storefronts listed as a separate contributing properties in the district.

=== Scientology ===
In 1995, the Church of Scientology bought the building for $1.6 million ($3.38 million in 2025), to be owned by church affiliate Author Services Inc. The building is currently used for readings of L. Ron Hubbard's pulp fiction and also to house a library of Hubbard's novels and short-story collections.

== Architecture and design ==
Security Trust features a Beaux-Arts design that includes a central entryway flanked by two colossal Corinthian columns. The building, which consists of one main section and three attached storefronts, was originally one-story in height; additional stories were added sometime after 1980.

== See also ==
- List of contributing properties in the Hollywood Boulevard Commercial and Entertainment District
