= Woolworth Building (Hollywood, California) =

Historic building in Los Angeles, California, U.S.

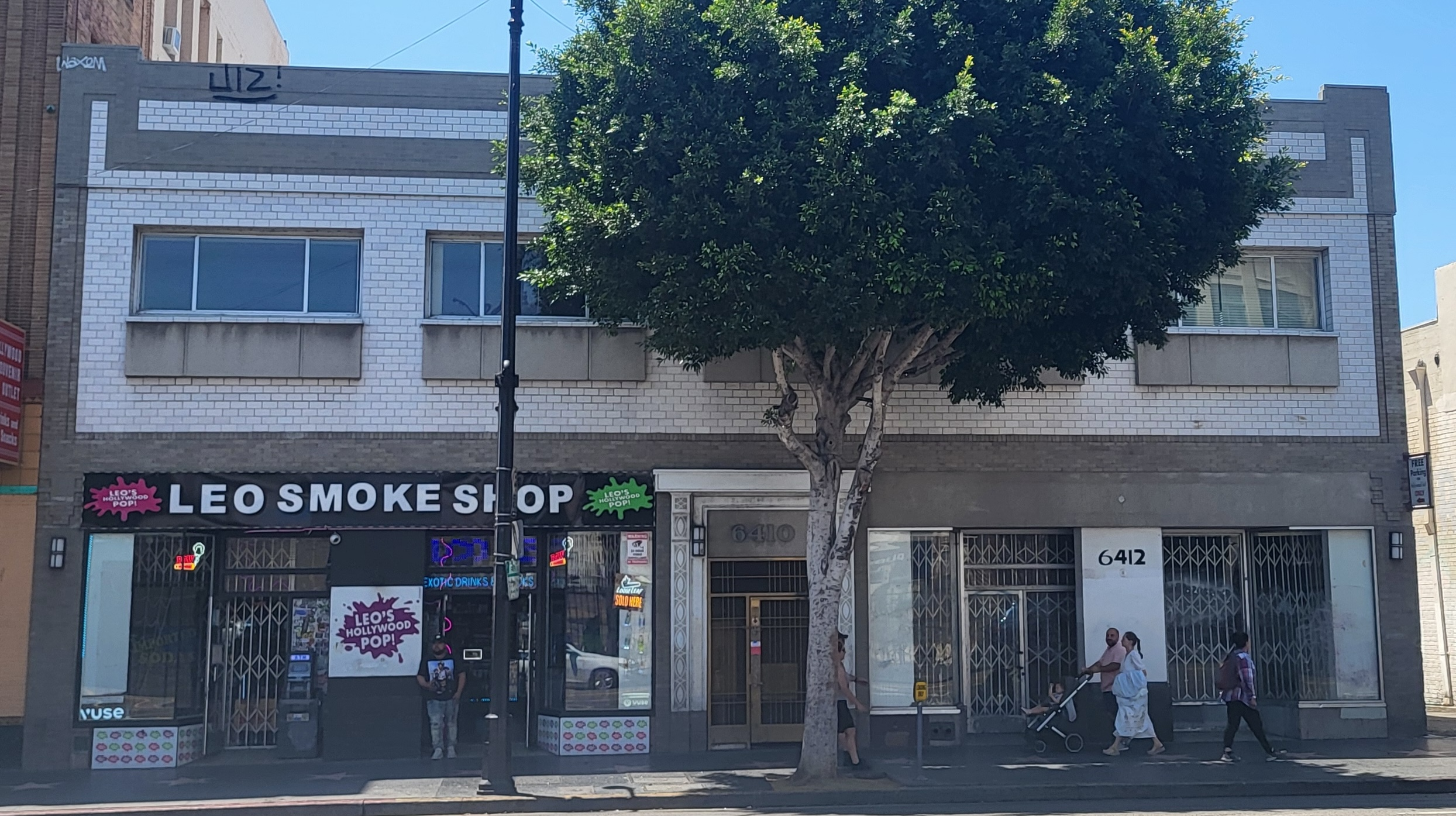
- The building in 2024
- Interactive map of the Woolworth Building area

General information
- Location: 6410 W. Hollywood Boulevard, Hollywood, California
- Coordinates: 34.101°N 118.330°W
- Year built: 1910
- Renovated: 1940s or 1954, 2001

Technical details
- Floor count: 2

The Woolworth Building, originally Toberman Hall or Toberman Building, is a historic building located at 6410 W. Hollywood Boulevard in Hollywood, California. It is named after its former tenant, Woolworth.

== History ==
The building in 1912

Toberman Hall, the oldest retail building on Hollywood Boulevard and the first commercial structure built by Charles E. Toberman, was built in 1910. (Note: The United States Department of the Interior states that the building was built in 1927.) According to the United States Department of the Interior, the building was remodeled in the 1940s, while a 2001 press release cites the remodel year as 1954.

In 1985, the Hollywood Boulevard Commercial and Entertainment District was added to the National Register of Historic Places, with Woolworth listed in the district. However, rather than being a contributing property, Woolworth was listed as a building which did not contribute to the character of the district.

CIM Group bought Woolworth Building for $1 million ($1.93 million in 2025). In 2001, they and Federal Realty Investment Trust renovated the building, this time returning it to its original 1910 design. The building was seismically upgraded as well.

== Architecture ==
The Woolworth Building is a two-story 65-by-100-foot (20 m × 30 m) commercial utilitarian structure that features simulated block, banded aluminum windows, and prominent signage on first floor banding.

During the building's first major renovation, the parapet and door frame were removed and large ceramic tiles were added to the facade. In 2001, the tiles were removed and new pilasters and lintel were added to frame the second floor entrance, same as it was in 1910. Also in 2001, a custom-formulated brick glaze was added to the building, one that matched the 1910 salt glaze that could no longer be produced due to new regulations.

== See also ==
- List of Woolworth buildings
