= Millers Stationers Building =

Building in Los Angeles, California, U.S.

- Millers Stationers
- U.S. Historic district – Contributing property
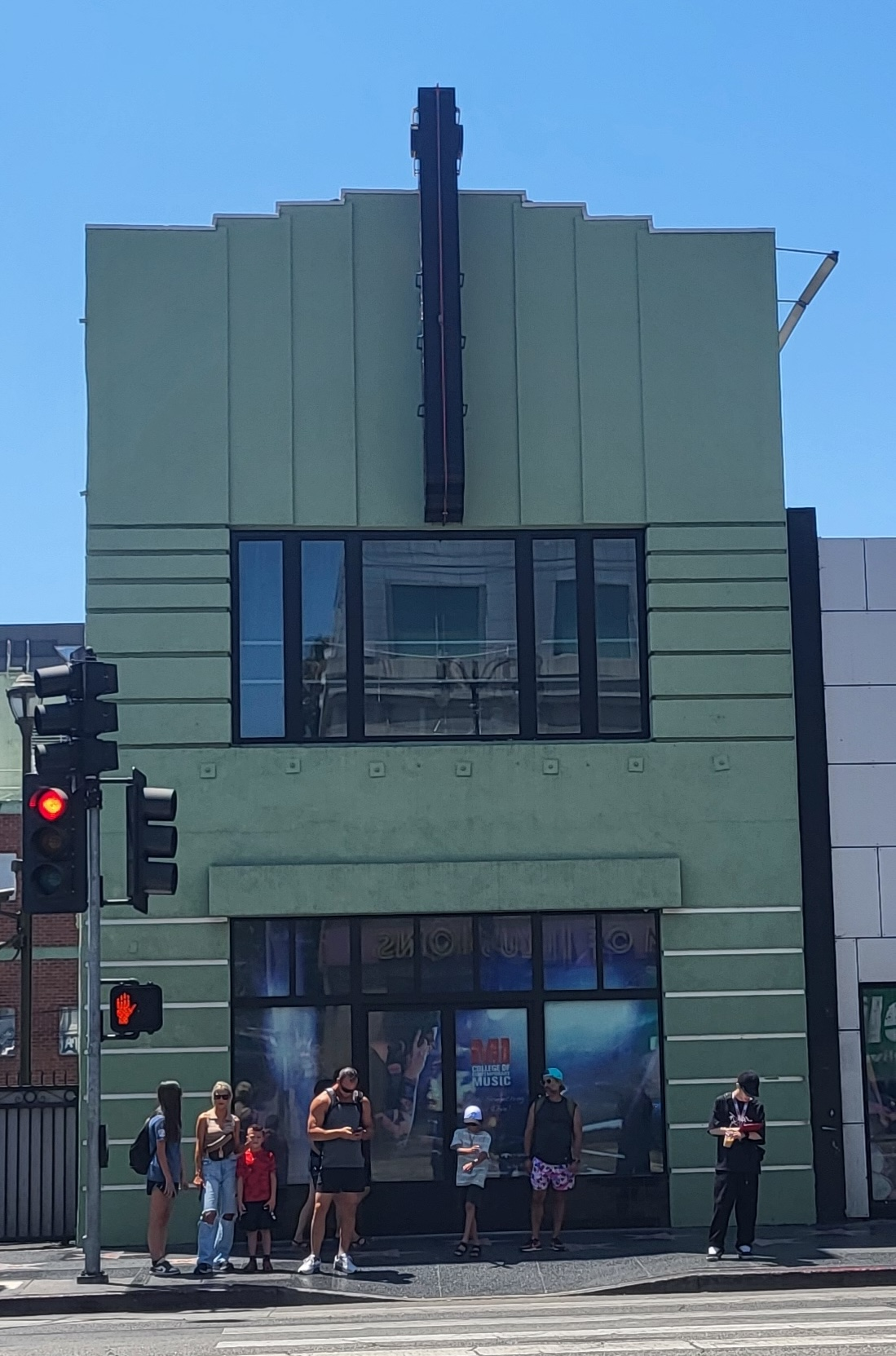
- The building in 2024

- Location within the Los Angeles metropolitan area
- Location: 6740 W. Hollywood Blvd., Hollywood, California
- Coordinates: 34.101°N 118.337°W
- Area: 6,500 square feet (600 m^{2})
- Built: 1933 remodel
- Architectural style: Art Deco
- Part of: Hollywood Boulevard Commercial and Entertainment District (ID85000704)
- Designated CP: April 4, 1985

Millers Stationers is a historic two-story building at 6740 W. Hollywood Boulevard in Hollywood, California.

== History ==
Millers Stationers was named after its 50 year occupant, the owner of which (J. R. Miller) also owned the building and moved out in 1986. The building was remodeled in 1933.

In 1985, the Hollywood Boulevard Commercial and Entertainment District was added to the National Register of Historic Places, with Millers Stationers listed as a contributing property in the district.

In 2009, the building was sold for $4.29 million ($6.44 million in 2025).

== Architecture and design ==
Millers Stationers is small in scale and Art Deco in design. It was described as "a simple but effective example of the style" by the United States Department of the Interior.

The building contains 6,500 square feet (600 m^{2}) of interior space.

== See also ==
- List of contributing properties in the Hollywood Boulevard Commercial and Entertainment District
