= Hollywood Congregational Church =

Building in Los Angeles, California, U.S.

- U.S. Historic district – Contributing property
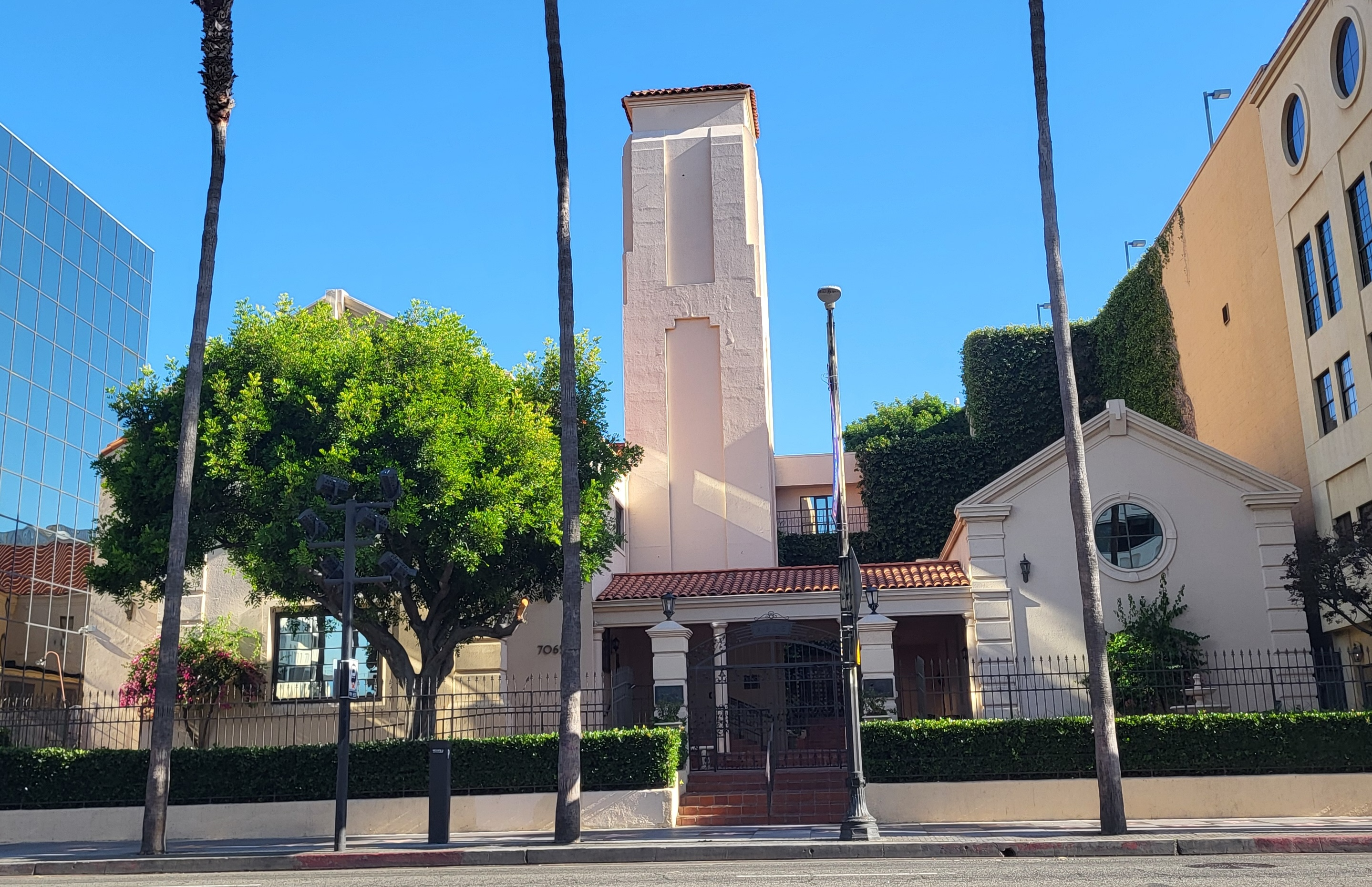
- Hollywood Congregational Church in 2024

- Location within the Los Angeles metropolitan area
- Location: 7065 W. Hollywood Blvd., Hollywood, California
- Coordinates: 34.1018°N 118.3438°W
- Built: 1920, 1935, 1947
- Architect: H. Glidden (1920)
- Architectural style: Mediterranean
- Part of: Hollywood Boulevard Commercial and Entertainment District (ID85000704)
- Designated CP: April 4, 1985

Hollywood Congregational Church is a historic former church at 7065 W. Hollywood Boulevard in Hollywood, California.

== History ==
Hollywood Congregational Church was organized on September 14, 1914, with 96 members. Their first home, Hollywood Congregational Church, was dedicated in 1920, after a three-year effort and at a cost of $61,000 ($980,357 in 2025). The church's sanctuary sat 500 and the church also featured a kitchen, serving room, and Boy Scout room.

In 1935, the church added a second hall at a cost of $13,000 ($305,279 in 2025) and in 1947, a third and final hall was added. By 1948, the church had grown to more than 1000 members.

In 1985, the Hollywood Boulevard Commercial and Entertainment District was added to the National Register of Historic Places, with Congregational Church listed as a contributing property in the district. At the time of its designation, the church was one of two institutional buildings on Hollywood Boulevard that exemplified the role of community organizations in Hollywood's development, the other being the Hollywood Masonic Temple.

From 1986 to 1993, the complex served as headquarters for the Screen Actors Guild. In 1995, the Church of Scientology purchased the complex for $1.75 million ($3.7 million in 2025), to house offices for the Association for Better Living and Education International.

== Architecture and design ==
Hollywood Congregational Church is an L-shaped complex that consists of three buildings around a central courtyard. All three buildings are connected by covered porticos and the main chapel features a Mediterranean design that includes a gable roof covered with red tile.

== See also ==
- List of contributing properties in the Hollywood Boulevard Commercial and Entertainment District
