= S. H. Kress and Co. Building (Los Angeles, California) =

Building in Los Angeles, California

- U.S. Historic district – Contributing property
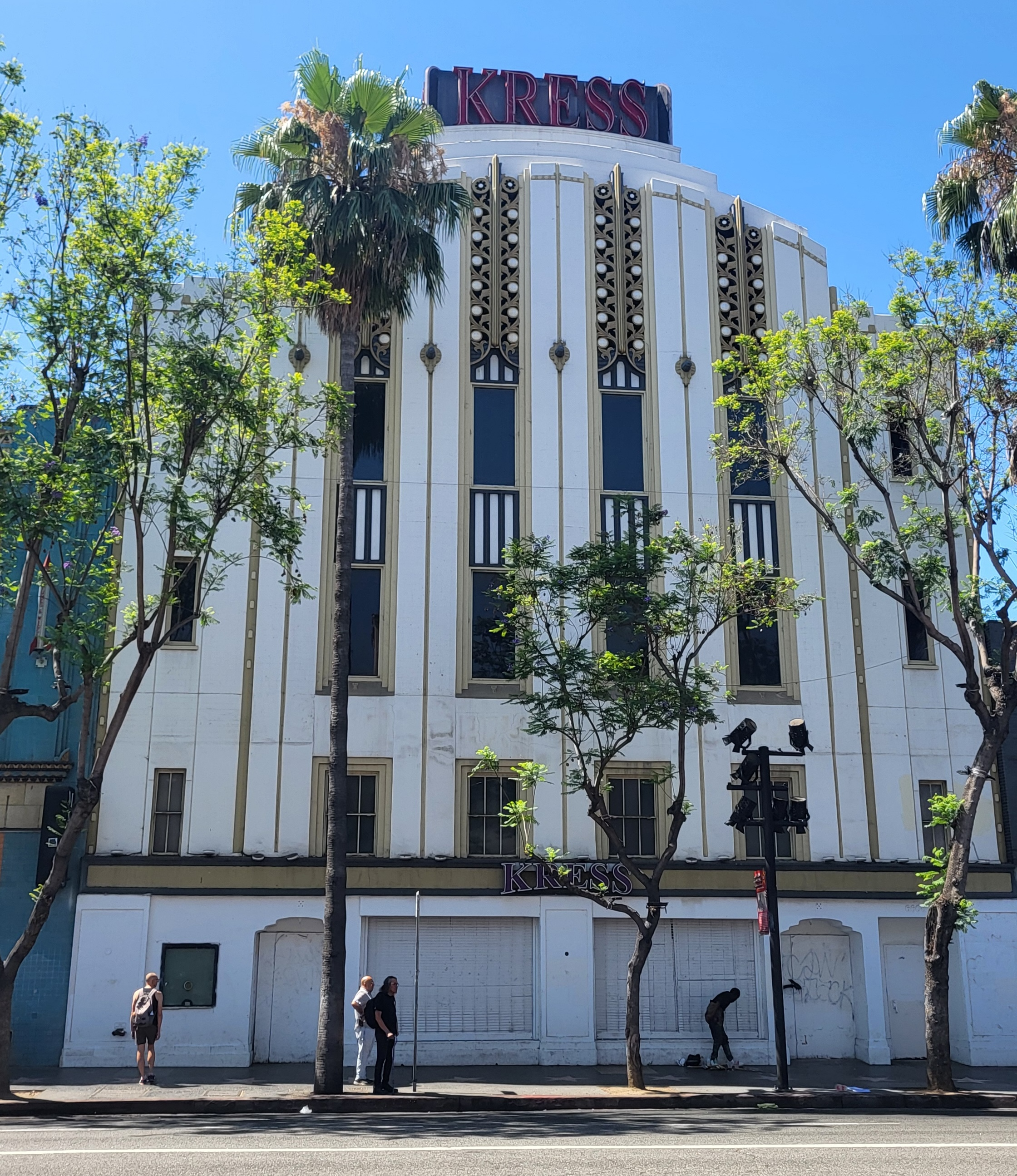
- The building in 2024

- Location within the Los Angeles metropolitan area
- Location: 6608 W. Hollywood Blvd. Hollywood, California
- Coordinates: 34.101°N 118.334°W
- Built: 1935
- Architect: Edward F. Sibbert
- Architectural style: Art Deco
- Part of: Hollywood Boulevard Commercial and Entertainment District (ID85000704)
- Designated CP: April 4, 1985

S. H. Kress and Co. Building, also known as S. H. Kress or The Kress, is a historic five-floor building at 6608 W. Hollywood Blvd. in Hollywood, California. It is known primarily for its architecture and its almost six decades as the flagship location of Frederick's of Hollywood.

== History ==
Built in 1935, Hollywood's S. H. Kress and Co. Building was designed by Edward F. Sibbert, one of fifty or so S. H. Kress & Co. buildings he designed across the United States.

In 1947, Frederick's of Hollywood moved into the building, the location serving as the company's flagship store. In 1986, the company opened the Celebrity Lingerie Hall of Fame here, showcasing intimate apparel from films such as: Some Like It Hot, Show Boat, and There's No Business Like Show Business, as well as personal items from Mae West, Cher, Madonna, Halle Berry, and others. The building and its contents were targets of looting during the 1992 Los Angeles riots, and Frederick's vacated the building in 2005.

In 1985, the Hollywood Boulevard Commercial and Entertainment District was added to the National Register of Historic Places, with this building listed as a contributing property in the district.

The building underwent a $30 million ($44.9 million in 2025) renovation in 2008, and re-opened with a basement nightclub, ground floor restaurant, mezzanine dining hall and sushi bar, third floor banquet facility/entertainment venue, and rooftop lounge. But despite drawing celebrities such as David Spade, Paris Hilton, Justin Timberlake, and Matthew Perry, the building went vacant again in 2011.

== Architecture and design ==
Like most S. H. Kress and Co. locations, this building features an Art Deco design, with this specific location being "a prime example of the Art Deco style" according to the United States Department of the Interior. The building features a colorful exterior and stepped vertical massing that results in a central tower ornamented with stylized carved stonework.

== See also ==
- List of contributing properties in the Hollywood Boulevard Commercial and Entertainment District
