= Christie Realty Building =

Historic building in Los Angeles, California, U.S.

- U.S. Historic district – Contributing property
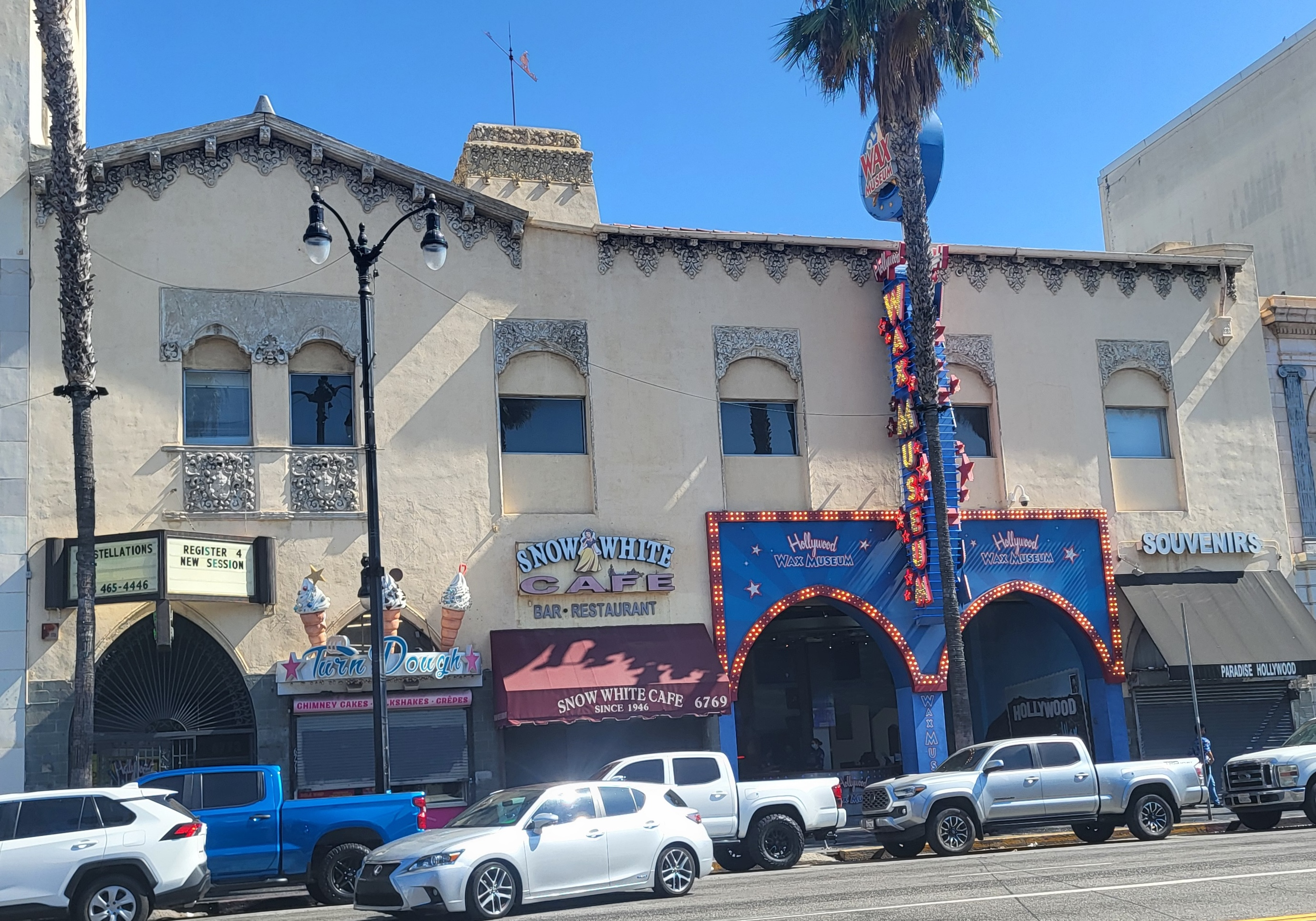
- The building in 2024

- Location within the Los Angeles metropolitan area
- Location: 6765-6773 W. Hollywood Blvd, Hollywood, California
- Coordinates: 34.102°N 118.338°W
- Built: 1928
- Architect: Carl Jules Weyl
- Architectural style: Spanish Colonial Revival
- Part of: Hollywood Boulevard Commercial and Entertainment District (ID85000704)
- Designated CP: April 4, 1985

Christie Realty Building, also known as Wax Museum Building, is a historic two-story building located at 6765-6773 W. Hollywood Blvd in Hollywood, California. It is best known for Hollywood Wax Museum, its 1965 to present tenant.

== History ==
Christie Realty Building was designed by Carl Jules Weyl and built in 1928. The building was owned by the Christie brothers, two of early Hollywood's most powerful movie moguls who also owned the nearby Christie Hotel.

The building's second story was originally home to the Embassy Club, a private club that catered to film stars looking to avoid the crowds at next door's Café Montmartre, both of which were owned by Eddie Brandstatter and connected by a secret passageway.

In 1933, due to the effects of the Stock Market Crash of 1929 and the ensuing Great Depression, the Christie brothers's companies were forced to file for bankruptcy. Assets, including this building, were sold away.

In 1946, the Disney-themed restaurant and bar Snow White Cafe opened in the building, where it would remain for 78 years. In 1965, the Hollywood Wax Museum moved into the building, where it remains to this day.

In 1985, the Hollywood Boulevard Commercial and Entertainment District was added to the National Register of Historic Places, with Wax Museum listed as a contributing property in the district.

== Architecture and design ==
Christie Realty Building features Spanish Colonial Revival architecture with street-level arches and Churrigueresque detailing on its second story.

== See also ==
- List of contributing properties in the Hollywood Boulevard Commercial and Entertainment District
