= Leed's Building =

Building in Los Angeles, California, U.S.

- Leed's
- U.S. Historic district – Contributing property
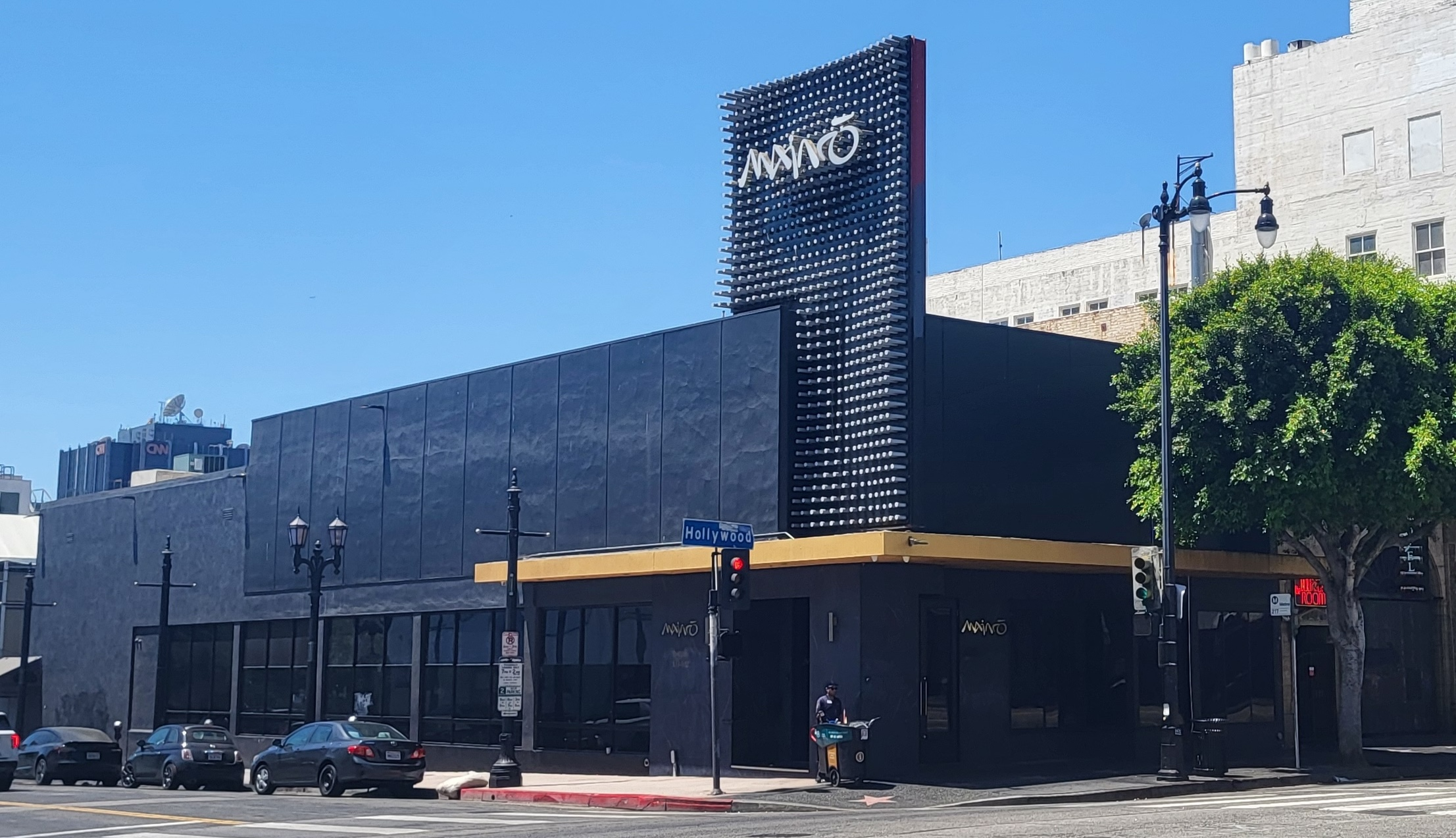
- The building in 2024

- Location within the Los Angeles metropolitan area
- Location: 6350-2 W. Hollywood Blvd., Hollywood, California
- Coordinates: 34.101°N 118.3284°W
- Built: 1935
- Architect: S. Charles Lee
- Architectural style: International Style
- Part of: Hollywood Boulevard Commercial and Entertainment District (ID85000704)
- Designated CP: April 4, 1985

Leed's is a historic one-story retail building at 6350-2 W. Hollywood Boulevard in Hollywood, California, formerly home to Leed's Shoe Store. It is a contributing property in the Hollywood Boulevard Commercial and Entertainment District

== History ==
Leed's was designed by renowned theater architect S. Charles Lee and built in 1935. Thrifty Drug Store, including a dining area and complete pharmacy, occupied the building in the 1930s, and Leed's Shoe Store moved into the building in 1957.

In 1985, the Hollywood Boulevard Commercial and Entertainment District was added to the National Register of Historic Places, with Leed's listed as a contributing property in the district.

== Architecture and design ==
Leed's Building is made of concrete with extensive use of glass and features an International Style design with an integral vertical sign balanced by intersecting parapets and a cantilevered front corner entrance.

== See also ==
- List of contributing properties in the Hollywood Boulevard Commercial and Entertainment District
