= Iris Theatre (Hollywood, California) =

Former movie theater in Hollywood, Los Angeles

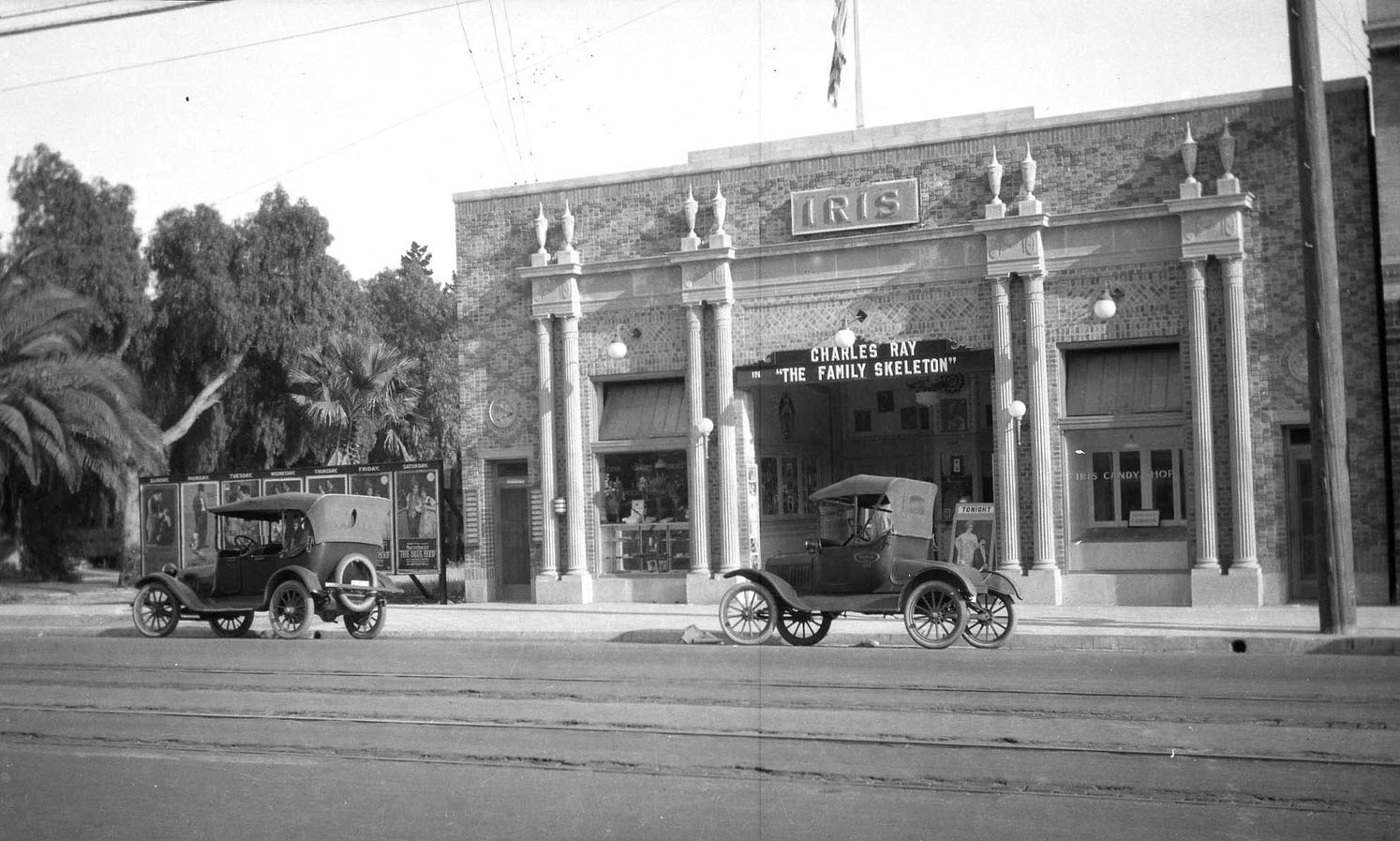
- The theater in either 1916 or 1918
- Interactive map of Iris Theatre
- Address: 6415 Hollywood Boulevard, Hollywood, California
- Coordinates: 34.102°N 118.330°W
- Type: Indoor movie theater

Construction
- Opened: 1914
- Closed: 1918
- Years active: 1914-1918

Hollywood's Iris Theatre was a historic movie theater located at 6415 W. Hollywood Boulevard in Hollywood, California.

== History ==
Iris Theatre opened in 1914, after Hollywood's first theater, Idyl Hour Theater located at 6525 Hollywood Boulevard, changed its name and location. This theater sat 230 or 400 and its success led the owner to change its location again, to the 800 or 1000-seat Iris Theatre, in 1918. It originally screened films made by Universal Film Company.

After Iris Theatre left 6415 Hollywood Boulevard in 1918, a Red Cross salvage station and then an auto livery moved in.

In 1985, the Hollywood Boulevard Commercial and Entertainment District was added to the National Register of Historic Places, and while this building was not listed as a contributing or non-contributing property, "Iris" was mentioned as one of the theaters that "created an aura of fantasy for the population of the area — and satisfied the tourists in search of "Hollywood" as well".

By 2009, this Iris Theatre had become an empty plot east of Hollywood Pacific Theatre.

== Architecture and design ==
The theater interior featured ornamental shades that covered inverted lights and the ceiling was decorated with festoons of roses.
