= Hallmark Building (Hollywood, California) =

Building in Los Angeles, California, U.S.

- U.S. Historic district – Contributing property
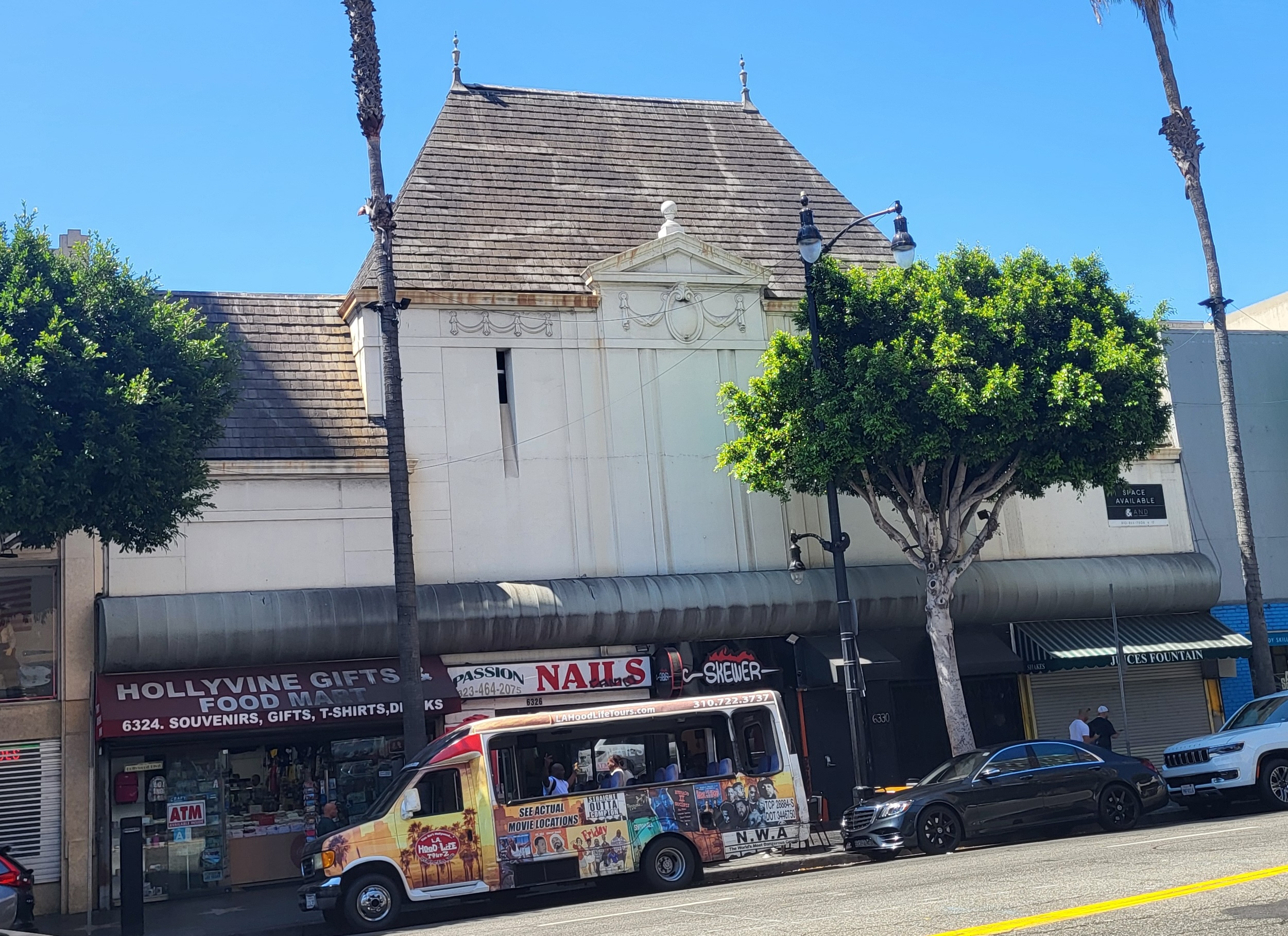
- The building in 2024

- Location within the Los Angeles metropolitan area
- Location: 6324 W. Hollywood Blvd., Hollywood, California
- Coordinates: 34.1015°N 118.3276°W
- Built: 1922, 1931
- Architect: Morgan, Walls & Clements (1931)
- Architectural style: Chateauesque
- Part of: Hollywood Boulevard Commercial and Entertainment District (ID85000704)
- Designated CP: April 4, 1985

Hallmark Building is a historic two-story commercial building located at 6324 W. Hollywood Boulevard in Hollywood, California. It is a contributing property in the Hollywood Boulevard Commercial and Entertainment District.

== History ==
Hallmark Building was built in 1922 and from 1922 until at least 1929 was home to Albert Witzel's third photography studio. In 1931, Morgan, Walls & Clements remodeled the building in the Chateauesque style; a candy store moved into the building that same year. The building caught fire in 1940.

In 1985, the Hollywood Boulevard Commercial and Entertainment District was added to the National Register of Historic Places, with Hallmark Building listed as a contributing property in the district.

== Architecture ==
Hallmark Building was remodeled in the Chateauesque style in 1931. A steep hipped roof is central to the building, as are thin windows in the pedimented bay. The second story also features numerous Regency details.

== See also ==
- List of contributing properties in the Hollywood Boulevard Commercial and Entertainment District
