= Artisan's Patio Complex =

Historic building complex in Los Angeles, California

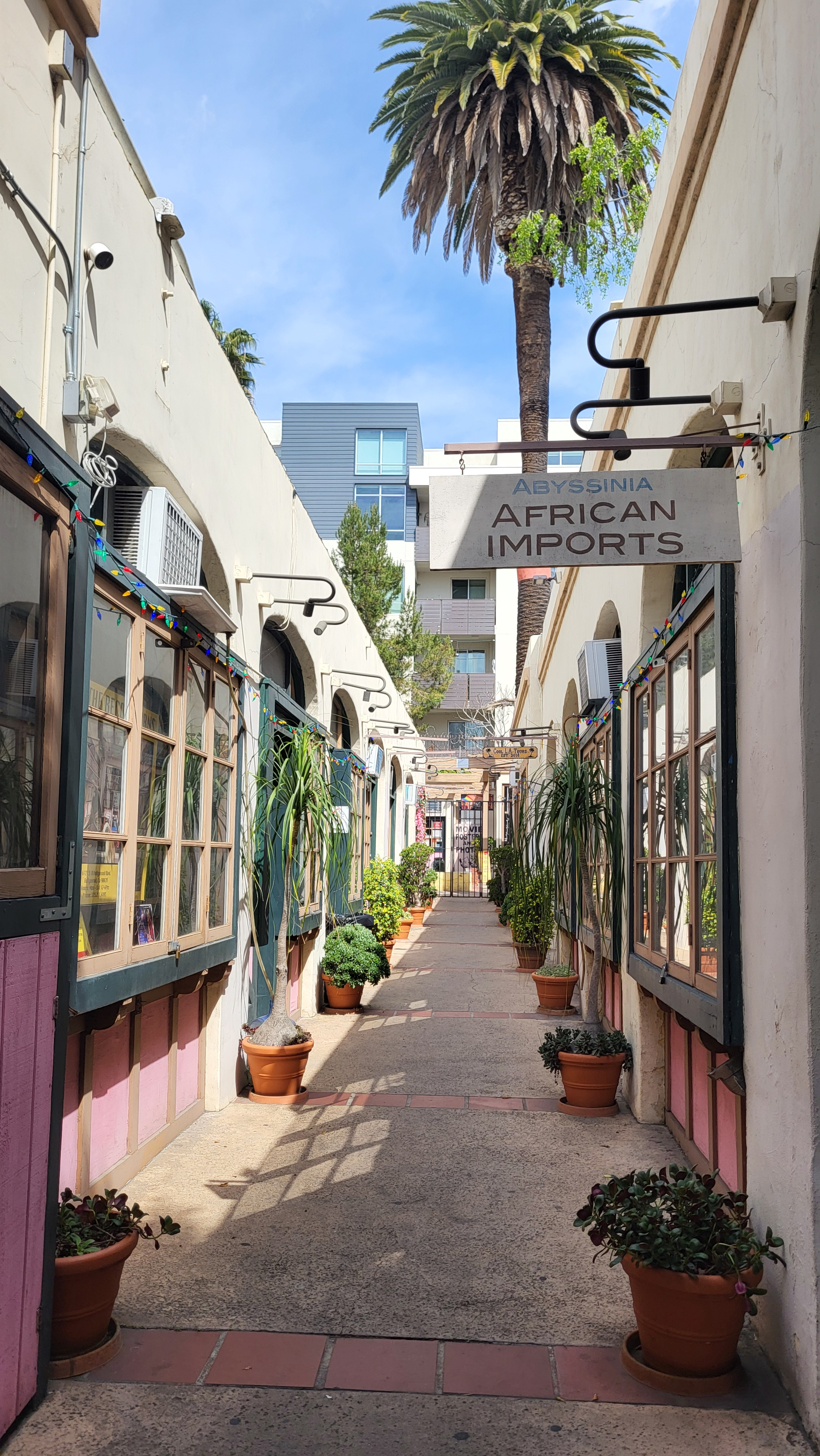
- Artisan's Patio in 2025

- Location within the Los Angeles metropolitan area

General information
- Location: Los Angeles, California, 6727-6733 W. Hollywood Boulevard, Hollywood, California 90028
- Coordinates: 34.108°N 118.292°W
- Opened: 1918

Technical details
- Floor count: 1
- Floor area: 5,067 square feet (470.7 m^{2})

Design and construction
- Architecture firm: Morgan, Walls & Clements

Los Angeles Historic-Cultural Monument
- Designated: October 17, 1989
- Reference no.: 453

Artisan's Patio Complex, also known as Artisan Patio, is a historic one-story retail complex located at 6727-6733 W. Hollywood Boulevard in Hollywood, California.

== History ==
Hollywood's Artisan's Patio Complex was designed by Morgan, Walls & Clements, built in 1918, and is the sole surviving courtyard building in the area.

In 1985, the Hollywood Boulevard Commercial and Entertainment District was added to the National Register of Historic Places, with Artisan Patio listed in the district. However, rather than being a contributing property, the building was listed as a one that did not contribute to the character of the district. In 1989, the building was declared Los Angeles Historic-Cultural Monument No. 453.

As of 2009, the building was owned by Aaron Epstein and rented out to fifteen small-businesses. Notable amongst these is Hollywood Movie Poster, which opened in 1979 and as of 2020 was the oldest memorabilia store in the world located in the same location with the same proprietor.

== Architecture and design ==
Artisan's Patio Complex is U-shaped and features a tiled exterior, arched entry, flat roof, courtyard, fountain, and 5,067 square feet (470.7 m^{2}) of overall space.
