= C.C. Brown's =

Former ice cream parlor in Hollywood, California

C.C. Brown's was an ice cream parlor that operated in Hollywood, Los Angeles, California from 1929 to 1996. The shop claimed to have invented the hot fudge sundae and became popular with celebrity clientele. Their long list of famous customers included Clark Gable, Mary Pickford, Joan Crawford, Bob Hope, Elvis Presley, and Marilyn Monroe. Judy Garland was once a waitress at the restaurant and Marlon Brando enjoyed sundaes in his limousine while his family ate inside. A thank you note from another regular, Ronald Reagan, hung on the wall.

C.C. Brown's opened as a candy shop in 1929 in the Hillcrest Cadillac building at 7007 Hollywood Boulevard just west of Grauman's Chinese Theater. The interior was decorated with flocked wallpaper, crystal chandeliers, high backed walnut booths, and mahogany tables brought from their original location in downtown Los Angeles. Employees wore white uniforms. Ice cream was served in metal goblets and sauces were presented warm in a small ceramic pitcher.

Founder Clifton Hibbard Brown learned candy making at his father Clarence Clifton (C.C.) Brown's downtown Los Angeles shop, which opened in 1906. The pair brought copper kettles and candy making equipment from their home in Ohio in a covered wagon. Clifton tinkered with chocolate sauce recipes for years and the shop served their first ice cream sundae in 1938. Other ice cream confections like the Lover’s Delight, the Buster Brown, and the Peter Pan were soon added to the menu, which also featured sandwiches and breakfast items. Clarence Clifton Brown died in 1943 at the age of 66.

John Schumacher, a chemist with the Carnation (brand) company, bought the business in 1963. He continued producing Brown's original recipes in the back kitchen and worked the counter, along with his wife and 8 children through the 1990s. Media attention picked up in the 1980s and food critic Ruth Reichl mused in 1983 that C.C. Brown's was "such a slide of small town Americana that you wonder whether you have somehow stumbled into some old Frank Capra movie set here in the heart of Hollywood." Business suffered due to the opening of Häagen-Dazs and Ben & Jerry's ice cream outlets nearby and the generally downtrodden condition of Hollywood Boulevard at the time.

Schumacher lived in Calabasas, California and died at age 69 in 1994. His wife Jo Ellen ran the store for two more years but was tired of her 15-hour a day, six day a week schedule. "None of her eight children," she told The New York Times, "wanted to take over." C.C. Brown's served up their last sundae on June 8, 1996. The closure was lamented by many in the community, including Hollywood Chamber of Commerce director Leron Gubler. "It's a shame to lose something with so much historic heritage," he told The New York Times in 1996. "At a time when Hollywood is on the verge of a major makeover."

Lawry's The Prime Rib currently serves the original C.C. Brown's Hot Fudge Sundae at all of their locations and sells jars of the sauce online. The Hollywood location is now a souvenir shop called La La Land.
