= Snow White Cafe =

Former restaurant and bar in Los Angeles, California, U.S.

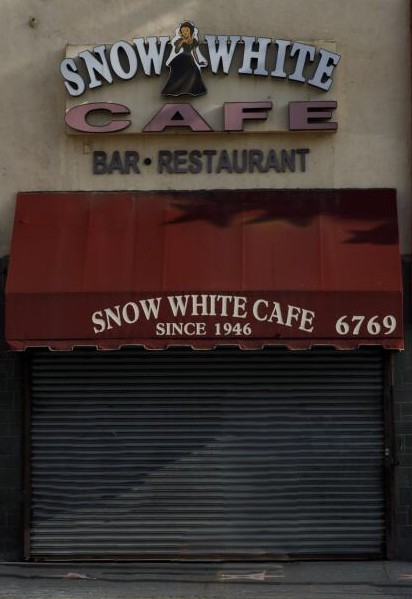
- The Cafe in 2023
- Interactive map of Snow White Cafe

Restaurant information
- Established: 1946
- Closed: 2024
- Location: 6769 W. Hollywood Blvd, Los Angeles, Los Angeles County, California
- Coordinates: 34.102°N 118.338°W

Snow White Cafe, formerly Snow White Waffle Shop and Snow White Coffee Shop, was a historic restaurant and bar located at 6769 W. Hollywood Boulevard in Hollywood, California. It was known for its Snow White and the Seven Dwarfs theming, although it was not affiliated with The Walt Disney Company.

== History ==
Snow White Waffle Shop opened in Hollywood's Christie Realty Building in 1946. The business would later change its name to Snow White Coffee Shop and later still to Snow White Cafe.

Despite the restaurant having no affiliation with The Walt Disney Company, it was decorated with murals featuring characters from Disney's 1937 film Snow White and the Seven Dwarfs, reportedly created by Disney animators. Additionally, the restaurant's original 1946 menu boasted a “Walt Disney Productions” copyright mark. According to the cafe's former website, The Walt Disney Company allowed this because the owner was friends with Walt Disney. Walt Disney was also a patron of the establishment.

Snow White Cafe sign in 2026

The cafe abruptly closed in June 2024. The site housed a Life is Sweet candy store as of 2026.
