= Hollywood Memorial Church =

Former church in Los Angeles, California, U.S.

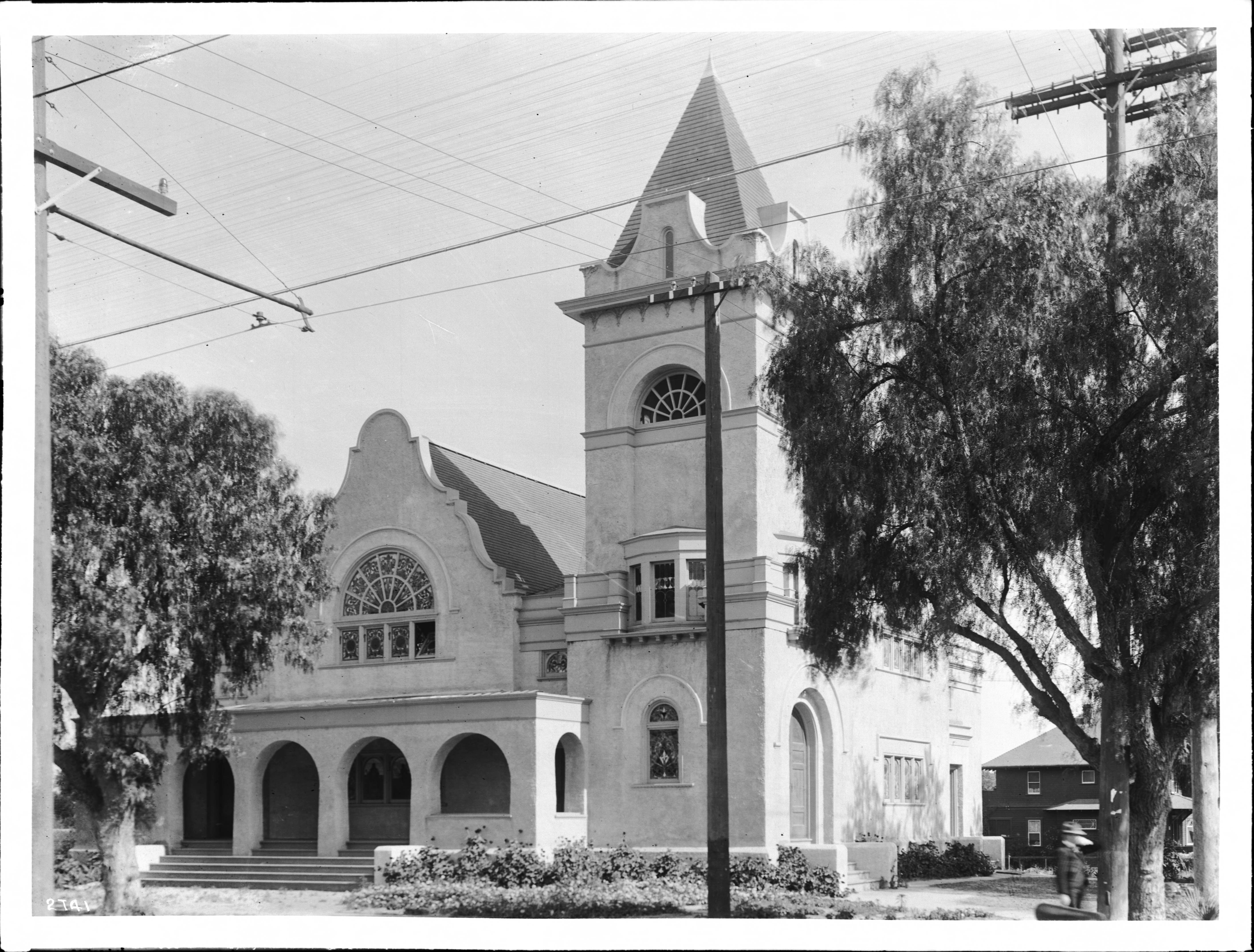
- Hollywood Memorial Church in 1905
- Interactive map of the Hollywood Memorial Church area

General information
- Architectural style: Mission Revival
- Location: Southeast corner of Prospect Avenue and Weyse Avenue
- Coordinates: 34°06′05″N 118°19′35″W
- Year built: 1903
- Demolished: 1923

Hollywood Memorial Church, also known as Hollywood Methodist Episcopal Church, was a church and community landmark located at the southeast corner of Prospect Avenue (now Hollywood Boulevard) and Weyse Avenue (now Vine Street) in what is now Hollywood, California. Built in 1903, it was the first congregational church in Hollywood.

== History ==
The German Methodist church was established in Los Angeles at the intersection of Fairfax Avenue and Santa Monica Boulevard in 1890. The church later moved to Cahuenga Boulevard and Selma Avenue.

In 1903, Hollywood Memorial Church was constructed, after which the Methodist Church moved in. The land, previously a lemon grove, was owned by Daeida Beveridge. In 1923, A.Z. Taft Jr bought the building for $125,000 ($2.36 million in 2025), and subsequently tore it down and built the Taft Building in its place.

== Architecture ==
Hollywood Memorial Church featured Mission Revival architecture and a four-story steeple. It was considered a community landmark.
