= Frolic Room =

Dive bar in Los Angeles, California, U.S.

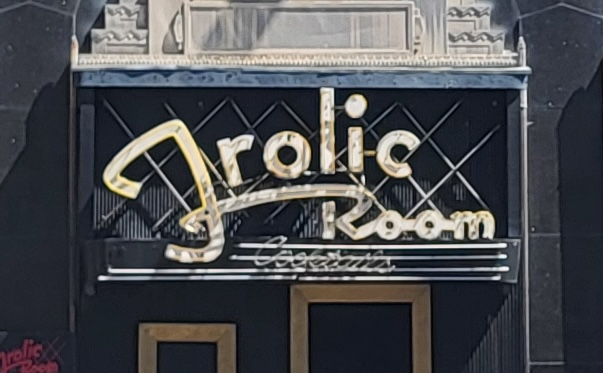
- Frolic Room sign, 2024
- Interactive map of Frolic Room

Restaurant information
- Established: 1930
- Location: 6245 Hollywood Blvd, Los Angeles, Los Angeles County, California
- Coordinates: 34.101°N 118.326°W
- Website: https://frolicroomla.com

Frolic Room is a historic bar located at 6245 W. Hollywood Boulevard in Hollywood, California, near Hollywood and Vine and next to the Pantages Theater. It is known for its neon sign, its history with Hollywood, and its association with the Black Dahlia.

== History ==
Opened as a speakeasy in 1930, Frolic Room converted to a legal bar in 1934. It is considered a dive bar by many publications, although it bills itself as being a cocktail bar since 1941.

Due to its location next to the Pantages Theater, Frolic Room was a popular celebrity hangout, particularly during the eleven years (1949–1959) the Pantages hosted the Academy Awards. Regular patrons included Frank Sinatra, Judy Garland, Charles Bukowski, and others, and from 1949 to 1954 both the Pantages and Frolic Room were owned by Howard Hughes. Hughes added the iconic neon sign to the building exterior during his ownership.

Frolic Room was the last location Elizabeth Short AKA the Black Dahlia was seen alive before her murder in 1947.

In 1963, an Al Hirschfeld mural depicting Albert Einstein, Clark Gable, Laurel and Hardy, Marilyn Monroe, the Marx Brothers, Tallulah Bankhead, and W. C. Fields amongst others was painted on the eastern interior. It was restored by Oscar Ropide in 2012.

== Film location ==
Frolic Room is a popular Hollywood film location. Films and television shows that shot here include: LA Confidential, Once Upon a Time in Hollywood, The Black Dahlia, A Woman Under the Influence, Colombo, Bosch, and more.
