= Cinemart Building =

Building in Los Angeles, California, U.S.

- U.S. Historic district – Contributing property
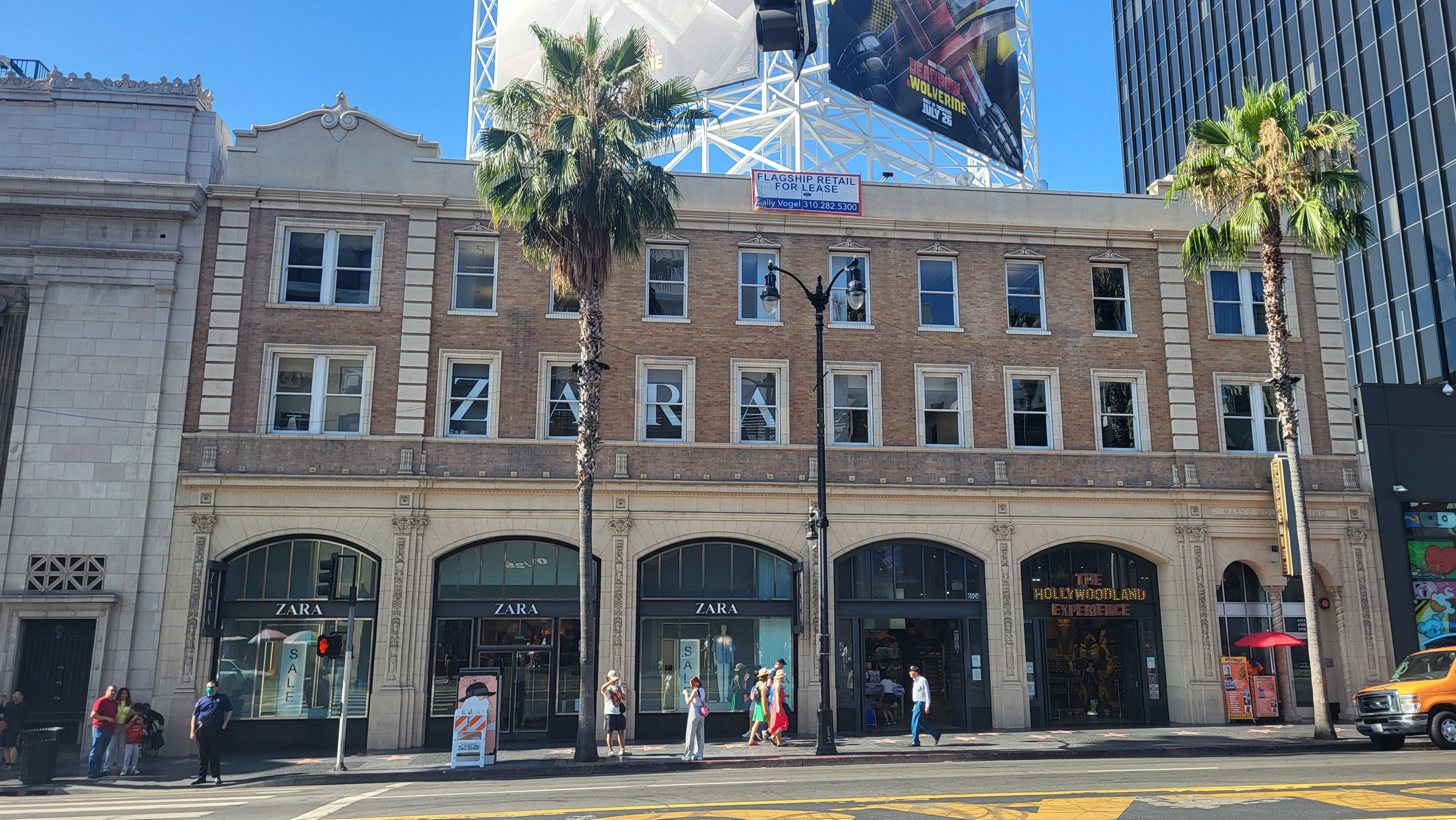
- The building in 2024

- Location within the Los Angeles metropolitan area
- Location: 6904 W. Hollywood Blvd., Hollywood, California
- Coordinates: 34.1014°N 118.3405°W
- Built: 1920
- Architectural style: Commercial Vernacular
- Part of: Hollywood Boulevard Commercial and Entertainment District (ID85000704)
- Designated CP: April 4, 1985

Cinemart Building, also known as Seven Seas, is a historic three-story building located at 6904 W. Hollywood Boulevard in Hollywood, California. It is known primarily for its Golden Age of Hollywood tenant: restaurant and nightclub 7 Seas.

== History ==
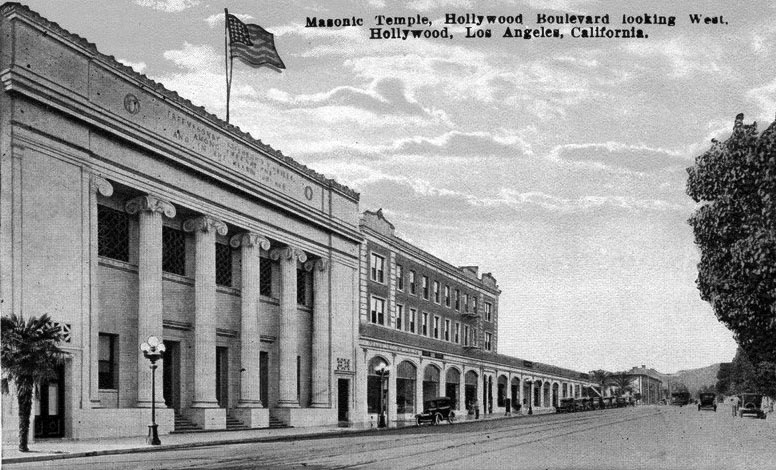
Cinemart Building next to the Hollywood Masonic Temple

Cinemart Building was built in 1920 and in the mid-1930s, Ray Haller opened the Polynesian bar 7 Seas in the building. The bar, which featured an exotic Tahitian atmosphere complete with thunder, lightning, and rain, was a popular location for celebrities as well as soldiers and sailors stationed in Los Angeles during World War II. The restaurant eventually added a Hawaiian show as well.

In the early 1940s, L. Wolfe Gilbert had an office in this building while he headed the American Society for Composers, Authors and Publishers.

In 1985, the Hollywood Boulevard Commercial and Entertainment District was added to the National Register of Historic Places, with Seven Seas listed as a contributing property in the district.

In 2007, the building was purchased by CIM Group, and in 2013, it was sold to a Maryland investment. As of 2024, the building is occupied by Zara and a souvenir shop.

== Architecture and design ==
Cinemart Building is a commercial vernacular building. It was constructed of brick and features rusticated masonry banding at its corners and carved masonry around the sash windows of the upper stories.

== See also ==
- List of contributing properties in the Hollywood Boulevard Commercial and Entertainment District
