= Security Trust and Savings =

Former bank in southern California

- The Hollywood branch in 1922
- Formerly: Security Savings Bank
- Type: Bank
- Founded: 1888
- Founder: Joseph F. Sartori
- Defunct: 1929
- Fate: Merged with First National Bank
- Successor: Security-First National
- Headquarters: Security Building, Los Angeles, California, United States
- Number of locations: 2, 6, 157 (1904, 1918, 1929)
- Area served: Southern California
- Total assets: $600 million (1929)
- Number of employees: 3500 (1929)

Security Trust and Savings, formerly Security Savings Bank, was a bank in southern California. It was the largest bank in Los Angeles in the early 1900s.

== History ==
Security Savings Bank was founded by Joseph F. Sartori in 1888, originally as a loan company located on Main Street in downtown Los Angeles. Soon after, the company renamed itself Security Trust and Savings. In 1904, the company moved into the H.W. Hellman Building in the Spring Street Financial District, and in 1907, it moved into the Security Building located on the same street. The bank was the largest in Los Angeles at the time.

Security Trust and Savings made its first acquisition, Security Main St. Savings Bank, in 1904, then acquired four more before World War I. All five acquisitions were located in Los Angeles. The bank's Hollywood location was "a power center of the entertainment industry" in the 1920s, with clients that included Charlie Chaplin, the Three Stooges, Lana Turner, W.C. Fields, Cecil B. DeMille, and Howard Hughes.

Security Trust and Savings began issuing installment mortgage loans in 1927. In 1929, the bank merged with First National Bank, its largest competitor. The new bank, renamed Security-First National, had 157 branches, 3,500 employees, and $600 million ($11.3 billion in 2025) in assets. Security-First National acquired Farmers and Merchants Bank of Los Angeles in 1956 and merged with Pacific National Bank in 1968, creating Security Pacific National Bank.
