= Yucca Vine Tower =

Office building in Los Angeles, California

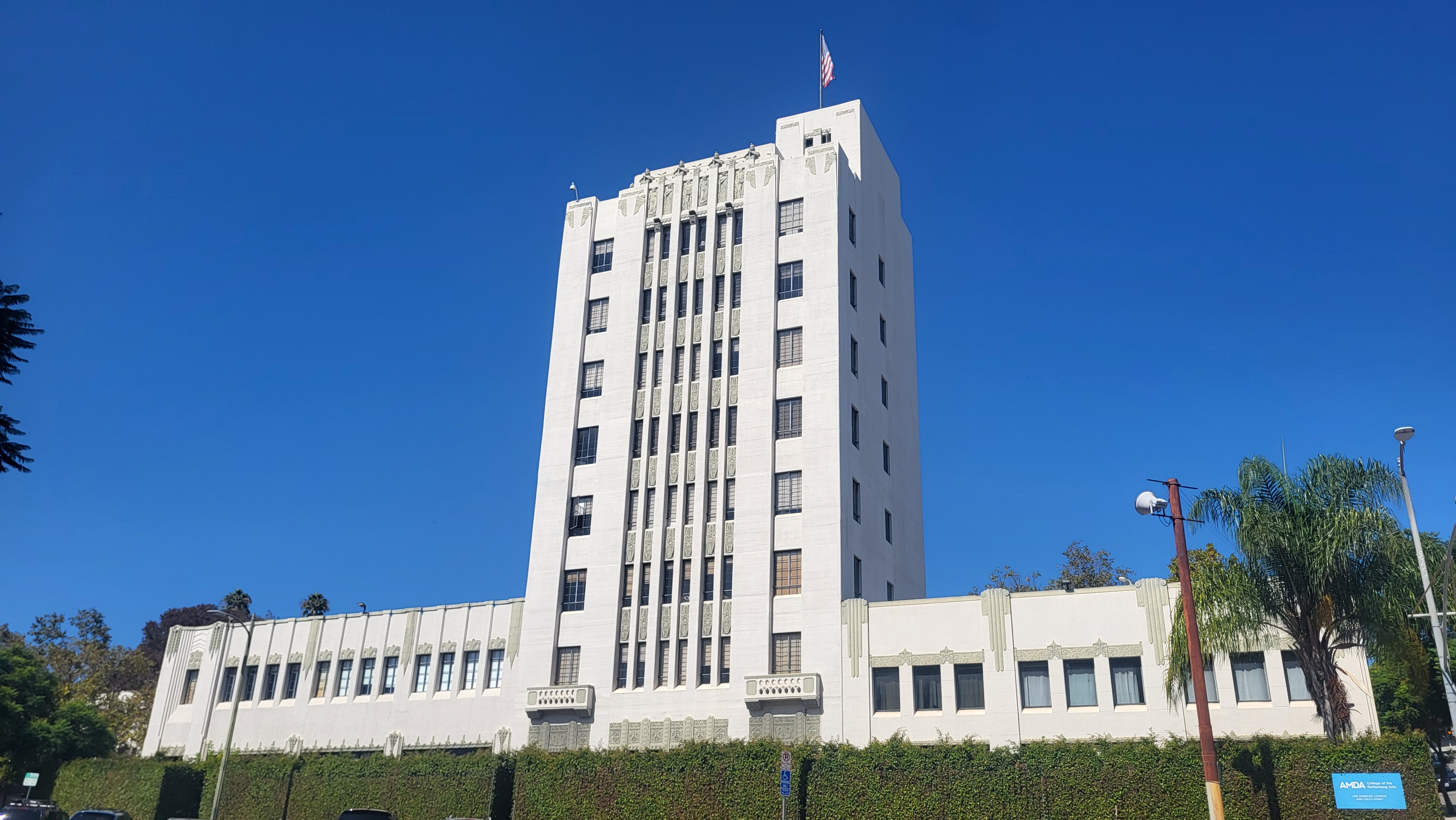
- The building in 2025
- Interactive map of the Yucca Vine Tower area

General information
- Architectural style: Art Deco
- Location: 1801-1805 N Vine Street and 6301-6317 W Yucca Street, Hollywood, Los Angeles, California
- Coordinates: 34.104°N 118.327°W
- Groundbreaking: October 1928
- Completed: 1929

Design and construction
- Architect: Henry L. Gogerty

Los Angeles Historic-Cultural Monument
- Designated: May 31, 2024
- Reference no.: 1302

Yucca Vine Tower, formerly Mountain States Building, Mountain States Life Insurance Building, and Postal Union Life Building, is a historic eight-story office building at 1801-1805 North Vine Street and 6301-6317 West Yucca Street in Hollywood, Los Angeles, California. It was declared Los Angeles Historic-Cultural Monument No. 1302 in 2024.

== History ==
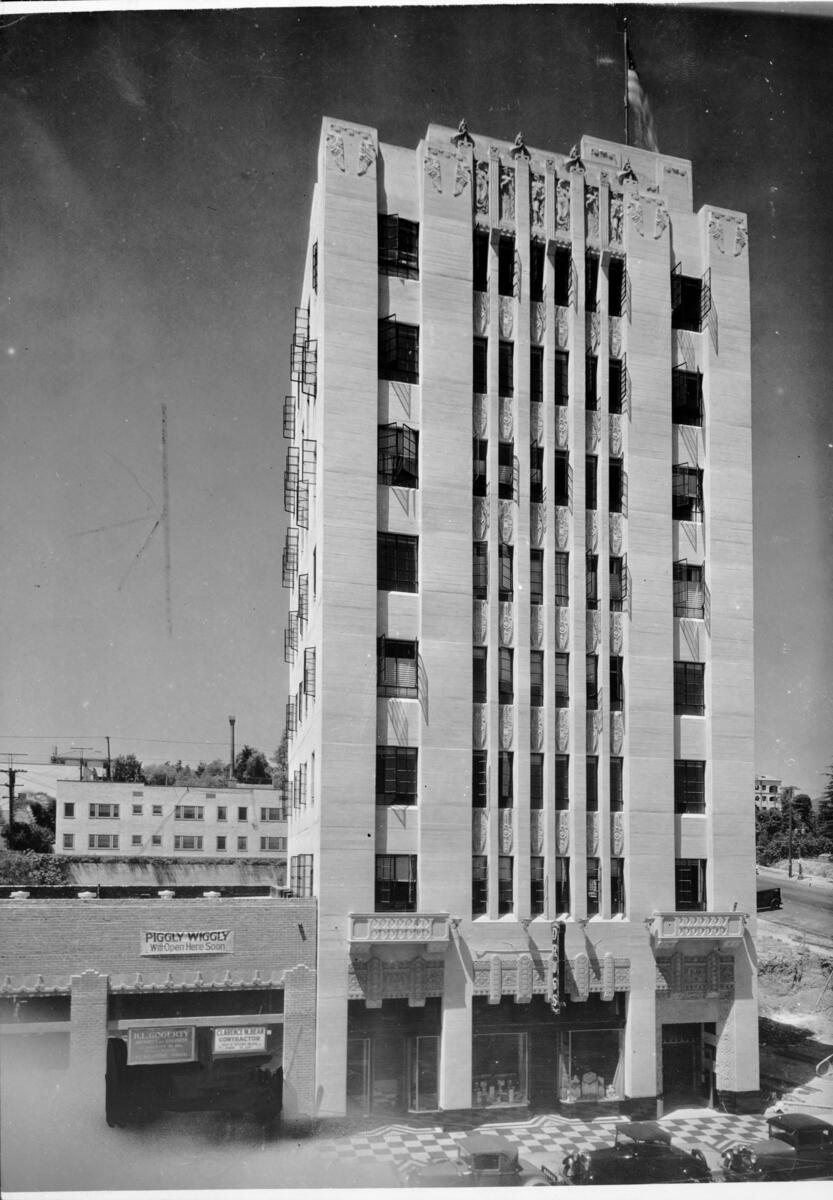
The newly-completed tower in 1929

Yucca Vine Tower was built in the Art Deco style by Henry L. Gogerty, the architect also responsible for the nearby Palace Theatre, Baine Building, and Hollywood Studio Building. Built in 1929, this building was one of Hollywood's first skyscrapers and played an important role in developing the Hollywood-Vine commercial district. The cost of construction was $250,000 ($4.69 million in 2025).

The building served as headquarters for the Mountain States Life Insurance Company from its opening until 1933, after which it was headquarters for the Postal Union Life Insurance Company. Also during the 1930s and 1940s, the building housed the Hollywood bureaus of Motion Picture Daily, Motion Picture Herald, and Hollywood Screen World, and Gene Autry’s Western Music Publishing Company had an office in the building, as did the Hollywood Anti-Nazi League.

In 1971, Chao Praya, one of the first Thai restaurants in the United States, opened in the building, where it remained for three decades. The American Musical and Dramatic Academy owned the building as of 2024.

The building's bas relief sculptures were restored in 2003. The building itself was declared Los Angeles Historic-Cultural Monument No. 1032 in 2024. The building's exterior and original interior were included in the designation; however, interior alternations from after the building was completed were not included. The Art Deco Society of Los Angeles spearheaded the effort to designate the building and historian Kathleen Perricone prepared the nomination.

== Architecture and design ==
Yucca Vine Tower is rectangular in plan and consists of an eight-story concrete tower flanked by two-story wood-frame, concrete and brick wings. The building features an Art Deco design and is considered an excellent example of a commercial art deco construction.

The tower's design emphasizes vertical lines with stepped setbacks. The facade features several columns, with bas-relief sculptures believed to be of Hestia, Hera, and Apollo, each repeating six times, between the inner ones. Eight eagles are perched on the outer columns, four on each side. Above the columns, four guards wielding downwards-pointing swords protect the parapet, the guards symbolic of the security life insurance brings and the downward swords implying the end of a fight. Additional Art Deco aspects in the building include zigzag elements, steel windows, hexagon-shaped spandrel, coffered ceilings, marble clad walls, elevator lobbies on each floor, and interior arched openings.

Integrity of the building is high, despite interior and exterior alterations.

== Filming location ==
The building was featured in Mission: Impossible, Mannix, CHiPs, The Day After Tomorrow, and the Three Stooges short Three Little Pigskins.

== See also ==
- List of Los Angeles Historic-Cultural Monuments in Hollywood
