= List of contributing properties in the Hollywood Boulevard Commercial and Entertainment District =

The district looking southwest from Hollywood and Vine. Visible properties include: Dyas (center), Plaza Hotel (left), Hallmark (right), Leed's (far right), and Palmer (far right).

The Hollywood Boulevard Commercial and Entertainment District is a historic district located in the Hollywood neighborhood of Los Angeles, California. The district, which spans 12 blocks between the 6200 and 7000 blocks of Hollywood Boulevard, contains more than 100 buildings, 59 of which are contributing. (Note: In the National Register of Historic Places, a contributing property is a building, structure, object, or site within a historic district that retains enough integrity to convey its contribution to the historic nature and significance of the district.) Many of these buildings are recognized for their significance to the entertainment industry, particularly Hollywood and its golden age, and the buildings are also significant to Los Angeles history, as they fostered the migration of the city's theatrical center from the Broadway Theater District to Hollywood.

The district consists primarily of commercial, financial, and retail buildings; however, contributing properties also include three residential, two institutional, and one whose upper floors were industrial. Historically, building tenants commonly consisted of either key figures in the entertainment industry or businesses and organizations that catered to them. Even more businesses catered to the many locals and tourists attracted by the industry to the neighborhood.

Many of the district's buildings are considered excellent examples of the predominant architectural styles from the time they were built. Most were designed in either the Art Deco, Spanish Colonial Revival, or Classical Revival styles, with the four major Art Deco variants (Classic Moderne, Streamline Moderne, Zigzag Moderne, and Hollywood Regency) and numerous Revival styles (Beaux Arts, Georgian, Gothic, Mediterranean, Neoclassical, and Renaissance) featured. Additional styles in the district include Chateausque, International, Programmatic, Vernacular, and Victorian. Many buildings are the works of Los Angeles's most premier architects, more than a dozen are Los Angeles Historic-Cultural Monuments (LAHCMs), and several are considered iconic or amongst the greatest of their style.

The district's period of significance is 1915 to 1939; the oldest building in the district, however, was built in 1903. The district was added to the National Register of Historic Places (NRHP) in 1985.

Contributing properties in the Hollywood Boulevard Commercial and Entertainment District
| Listed Name | Alternate Name | Image | Address | Type | Style | Architect | Year built | Additional information |
|---|---|---|---|---|---|---|---|---|
| Pantages Theater | Hollywood Pantages | Exterior of the front of the building with sign and marquee | 6233 Hollywood Blvd; 34.1019°N 118.3258°W | Theater | Art Deco | B. Marcus Priteca | 1930 | LAHCM No. 193 |
| Equitable Building | Bank of Hollywood Building, The Lofts at Hollywood and Vine | Exterior of the front and south side of the building | 6253 Hollywood Blvd; 34.1019°N 118.3263°W | Office | Neo-Gothic and Art Deco | Aleck Curlett | 1929 | LAHCM No. 1088. Residential conversion in 2007. |
| Palace Theater | Hollywood Playhouse, Hollywood Palace, Avalon Hollywood | Exterior of the front of the building | 1735 Vine St; 34.1027°N 118.3270°W | Theater | Spanish Colonial Revival | Gogerty & Weyl | 1926 | |
| Guaranty Building | Hollywood Guaranty Building, Allstate Title Building, L. Ron Hubbard Life Exhibition Building | Exterior of the front and west side of the building | 6331 Hollywood Blvd; 34.1019°N 118.3279°W | Office and financial | Beaux Arts | John C. Austin and Frederic M. Ashley | 1923 | NRHP No. 79000481 |
| Knickerbocker Hotel | Hollywood Knickerbocker | Exterior of the north side and front of the building and rooftop sign | 1714 Ivar St; 34.1027°N 118.3279°W | Residential | Classical | John M. Cooper (and/or E. M. Frasier) | 1929 | |
| Regal Shoes | | Exterior of the rounded front and east side of the building | 6349 Hollywood Blvd; 34.1019°N 118.3284°W | Retail | Streamline Moderne | Walker & Eisen | 1939 | |
| Security Trust | Security Trust and Savings, Security Pacific Bank | Exterior of the west and south-facing fronts of the building | 6381 Hollywood Blvd; 34.1019°N 118.3293°W | Office and financial | Italian Renaissance Revival | Parkinson & Parkinson | 1921 | LAHCM No. 334, NRHP No. 83001204 |
| Warner Theater | Warner Brothers Hollywood, Pacific Hollywood Theatre | Exterior of the front of the building with marquee, sign, and a portion of one rooftop radio antennae | 6423 Hollywood Blvd; 34.1019°N 118.3308°W | Theater, office, and retail | Spanish Renaissance Revival | B. Marcus Priteca | 1930 | LAHCM No. 572 |
| Holly Cinema | Studio Theatre, Colony Theatre, Music Hall, Academy Theatre, Holly Theatre | Exterior of the front of the building partially obscured by a tree | 6523 Hollywood Blvd; 34.1019°N 118.3315°W | Theater and commercial | Chateauesque | Edward B. Rust (1920), S. Charles Lee (1931) | 1920, 1931 | |
| Hillview Apartments | The Hillview, Hudson Apartments, Harlan Residences | Exterior of the front of the building with an SUV parked in front | 6531 Hollywood Blvd; 34.1019°N 118.3322°W | Residential | Mediterranean Revival | Tifal brothers | 1917 | |
| Janes Residence | Janes House | Exterior of the front of the building with trees and a motorcyclist driving by in front | 6541 Hollywood Blvd; 34.1023°N 118.3325°W | Residential | Victorian | Dennis & Farwell | 1903 | LAHCM No. 227. Commercial conversion in 1986. Hospitality conversion in 2006. |
| Johnny's Steak House | | Exterior of the front of the building with trees in front | 6553 Hollywood Blvd; 34.1019°N 118.3330°W | Commercial | Chateauesque | Henry L. Gogerty | 1930 | |
| Baine Building | Baine Studio Building | Exterior of the south-facing front of the building with trees in front | 6601 Hollywood Blvd; 34.1019°N 118.3336°W | Commercial and retail | Spanish Colonial Revival | Gogerty & Weyl | 1926 | |
| Musso & Frank's | | Exterior of the front of the building with rooftop sign and palm trees in front | 6663 Hollywood Blvd; 34.1019°N 118.3353°W | Hospitality | Vernacular | L. A. Smith | 1917 | |
| 6679 Hollywood Blvd. | Davis Building | Exterior of the west and south-facing fronts of the building with the southern front partially obscured by a tree | 6679 Hollywood Blvd; 34.1019°N 118.3360°W | Commercial | Beaux Arts/Vernacular | F. L. Paulson | 1914 | |
| Outpost Building | | Exterior of the front of the building partially obscured by a tree | 6701 Hollywood Blvd; 34.1019°N 118.3366°W | Office | Spanish Colonial Revival and French Regency | E. Parcher | 1920 | |
| Pickwick Books | | Exterior of the building's three fronts and two western sides | 6743 Hollywood Blvd; 34.1019°N 118.3372°W | Retail | Vernacular, Art Deco, and Spanish Colonial Revival | Morgan, Walls & Clements (1925) | 1917, 1925, 1936 | |
| Montmartre | Café Montmartre | Exterior of the front of the building partially obscured by a banner and tour bus | 6755 Hollywood Blvd; 34.1019°N 118.3379°W | Hospitality and retail | Italian Renaissance Revival | Meyer & Holler | 1922 | |
| Wax Museum | Christie Realty Building | Exterior of the front of the building | 6765 Hollywood Blvd; 34.1019°N 118.3382°W | Office and retail | Spanish Colonial Revival | Carl Jules Weyl | 1928 | |
| Security Pacific | First National Bank Building, Hollywood First National | Exterior of the front and west and south sides of the building | 6777 Hollywood Blvd; 34.1019°N 118.3385°W | Office and financial | Gothic Revival and Art Deco | Meyer & Holler | 1927 | |
| Chinese Theater | Grauman's Chinese | Exterior of the front of the building | 6925 Hollywood Blvd; 34.1020°N 118.3410°W | Theater | Programmatic | Meyer & Holler | 1927 | LAHCM No. 55 |
| 7001 Hollywood Blvd | Petersen Building | Exterior of the south and east-facing fronts of the building | 7001 Hollywood Blvd; 34.1019°N 118.3419°W | Retail | Art Deco | Meyer & Holler | 1929 | |
| Security Trust | Hollywood Savings and Loan | Exterior of the front of two attached buildings with palm trees in front | 7051 Hollywood Blvd; 34.1019°N 118.3435°W | Financial | Beaux Arts | Parkinson & Parkinson | 1928 | Office conversion in 1995 |
| Stores | | Exterior of the front of two attached buildings with palm trees in front | 7055 Hollywood Blvd; 34.1019°N 118.3437°W | Retail | Beaux Arts | Parkinson & Parkinson | 1928 | Building adjoins Security Trust |
| Congregational Church | | Exterior of the front of the building partially obscured by a tree | 7065 Hollywood Blvd; 34.1019°N 118.3439°W | Institutional | Mediterranean Revival | H. Glidden | 1920 | |
| Hollywood Professional | SEVENTY46 | Exterior of the front and west side of the building | 7046 Hollywood Blvd; 34.1014°N 118.3431°W | Office | Neo-Gothic | Richard D. King | 1924 | LAHCM No. 876. Residential conversion in 2004. |
| Arthur Murray | Johnny Grant Building | Exterior of the front of the building with palm trees in front | 7024 Hollywood Blvd; 34.1014°N 118.3422°W | Commercial | Renaissance Revival | Frank Meline | 1919 | |
| Hotel Roosevelt | Hollywood Roosevelt | Exterior of the south facing front of the building with rooftop sign and palm trees in front | 7000 Hollywood Blvd; 34.1012°N 118.3418°W | Hospitality | Spanish Colonial Revival | Fisher, Lake & Traver | 1924 | LAHCM No. 545 |
| Seven Seas | Cinemart Building | Exterior of the front of the building with palm trees in front | 6904 Hollywood Blvd; 34.1014°N 118.3405°W | Commercial | Vernacular | | 1920 | |
| Masonic Temple | El Capitan Entertainment Centre | Exterior of the front of the building with Jimmy Kimmel Live banners on it | 6840 Hollywood Blvd; 34.1014°N 118.3402°W | Institutional | Neo-classical | John C. Austin | 1921 | LAHCM No. 277, NRHP No. 85000355 |
| El Capitan / Paramount | El Capitan Theatre | Exterior of the front of the building with marquee | 6834 Hollywood Blvd; 34.1014°N 118.3399°W | Theater and office | Spanish Colonial Revival | Morgan, Walls and Clements, G. Albert Lansburgh | 1926 | LAHCM No. 495 |
| 6806 Hollywood Blvd | | Exterior of the front of the building | 6806 Hollywood Blvd; 34.1014°N 118.3393°W | Commercial | Art Deco | | 1922 | |
| Lee Drug | | Exterior of the front and north and east-facing sides of the building | 6800 Hollywood Blvd; 34.1014°N 118.3389°W | Retail | Streamline Moderne | B. D. Bixby | 1935 | |
| Max Factor Salon | Max Factor Building | Exterior of the front of the building with banners and Hollywood Museum sign | 1666 Highland Ave; 34.1010°N 118.3385°W | Commercial and industrial | Hollywood Regency | S. Charles Lee | 1931 | LAHCM No. 593. Hospitality conversion in 2001 and 2002. |
| Bank of America | C. E. Toberman and Co. Building | Exterior of the west side of the building with a Tyrannosaurus Rex breaking through the roof and eating a clock | 6780 Hollywood Blvd; 34.1014°N 118.3385°W | Financial | Beaux Arts | Morgan, Walls & Clements (1935) | 1914, 1935 | Commercial conversion in 1992 |
| Hollywood Theater | | Exterior of the front of the building with marquee and sign at night | 6766 Hollywood Blvd; 34.1014°N 118.3380°W | Theater | Originally Romanesque Revival, replaced by Art Deco in 1936 | Krempel and Erkes (1913), Clifford Balch (1927), S. Charles Lee (1936) | 1913, 1933 (or 1913, 1927, 1936) | Commercial conversion in 1994 |
| Millers Stationers | | Exterior of the front of the building | 6740 Hollywood Blvd; 34.1014°N 118.3375°W | Retail | Art Deco | | 1933 remodel | |
| Christie Hotel | | Exterior of the front and east side of the building with Scientology sign | 6724 Hollywood Blvd; 34.1014°N 118.3371°W | Hospitality | Georgian Revival | Arthur Rolland Kelly | 1922 | Residential conversion in 1974 |
| Pig 'n Whistle | | Exterior of the building entrance and sign | 6718 Hollywood Blvd; 34.1014°N 118.3367°W | Hospitality / commercial | Spanish Colonial Revival | Morgan, Walls & Clements | 1917, 1927 | |
| Egyptian Theater | Grauman's Egyptian | Exterior of the front of the building with a courtyard in front and similarly designed buildings beside it | 6708 Hollywood Blvd; 34.1010°N 118.3366°W | Theater | Programmatic | Meyer & Holler | 1922 | LAHCM No. 584 |
| Shane Building | Hollywood Center | Exterior of the east-facing front of the building minus the ground floor | 6652 Hollywood Blvd; 34.1014°N 118.3352°W | Office | Art Deco | Norton & Wallis | 1930 | |
| Cherokee Building | | Exterior of the west side of the building | 6630 Hollywood Blvd; 34.1014°N 118.3348°W | Retail / commercial | Spanish Colonial Revival | Norman W. Alpaugh | 1927 | |
| The Orient | | Exterior of the front of the building partially obscured by trees | 6626 Hollywood Blvd; 34.1014°N 118.3343°W | Retail | Art Deco | | 1927, 1937 | |
| S. H. Kress | The Kress | Exterior of the front of the building with trees in front | 6606 Hollywood Blvd; 34.1014°N 118.3336°W | Retail | Art Deco | Edward F. Sibbert | 1935 | |
| J. J. Newberry | | Exterior of the front of the building with trees in front | 6600 Hollywood Blvd; 34.1014°N 118.3334°W | Retail | Art Deco | J. J. Newberry architectural staff | 1928 | |
| Hollywood Toys | Hollywood Studio Building | Exterior of the front of the building with trees in front | 6554 Hollywood Blvd; 34.1014°N 118.3332°W | Office and retail | Spanish Colonial Revival | Gogerty & Weyl | 1927 | |
| Consumer Drug | | Exterior of the south and east-facing fronts of the building | 6542 Hollywood Blvd; 34.1014°N 118.3326°W | Retail | Moderne | H. Rice | 1919, 1938 | |
| Attie Building | Playmates of Hollywood Building | Exterior of the front and west side of the building | 6436 Hollywood Blvd; 34.1014°N 118.3309°W | Retail | Art Deco | Henry A. Minton | 1931 | |
| Creque Building | Hollywood Building | Exterior of the front and east side of the building | 6400 Hollywood Blvd; 34.1014°N 118.3297°W | Office / commercial | Art Deco | E. Fossler (1913), B. B. Homer (1931) | 1913, 1931 | |
| Julian Medical Building | Owl Drug Store Building | Exterior of the west side of the building | 6380 Hollywood Blvd; 34.1014°N 118.3294°W | Retail / commercial | Streamline Moderne | Morgan, Walls & Clements | 1934 | |
| Palmer Building | | Exterior of the front and west side of the building | 6362 Hollywood Blvd; 34.1014°N 118.3287°W | Office | Renaissance Revival | Edward T. Flaherty | 1921 | |
| Leed's | | Exterior of the front and partially obscured north side of the building | 6352 Hollywood Blvd; 34.1014°N 118.3283°W | Commercial | International Style | S. Charles Lee | 1935 | |
| Hallmark | | Exterior of the front of the building with trees in front | 6324 Hollywood Blvd; 34.1014°N 118.3276°W | Retail | Chateauesque | Morgan, Walls & Clements | 1927, 1938 | |
| Dyas Bldg. | Broadway Building, Broadway Hollywood Building, Broadway Department Store Building | Exterior of the east and south-facing fronts of the building partially obscured by trees and another building with a sign reading backwards on the rooftop | 6300 Hollywood Blvd; 34.1014°N 118.3270°W | Retail | Classical Revival with an International Style addition | Frederick Rice Dorn (1927), Parkinson and Parkinson (1938) | 1927, 1938 | LAHCM No. 664. Residential conversion in 2005. |
| Plaza Hotel | Hollywood Plaza Hotel | Exterior of the front of the building with the Dyas Building partially obscured on the side | 1633 Vine St; 34.1009°N 118.3270°W | Hospitality | Renaissance Revival | Walker & Eisen | 1924 | LAHCM No. 665. Residential conversion in 1973. |
| Hollywood Brown Derby | | Postcard photo of the exterior of the front of the building | 1628 Vine St; 34.1007°N 118.3264°W | Hospitality | Spanish Colonial Revival | Carl Jules Weyl | 1928 | Demolished in 1994 |
| Stores | Herman Building, Bernard Luggage Building | Exterior of the front of the building partially obscured by cars and a tree | 1632 Vine St; 34.1009°N 118.3264°W | Retail | Spanish Colonial Revival | Carl Jules Weyl | 1928 | |
| Taft Building | | Exterior of the south and west-facing fronts of the building | 1680 Vine St; 34.1014°N 118.3264°W | Office | Renaissance Revival | Walker & Eisen | 1923 | LAHCM No. 666 |
| Gilberts Books | | | 6264 Hollywood Blvd; 34.1014°N 118.3260°W | Commercial | Chateauesque | H. J. Knauer | 1932 | Demolished as of 2020 |
