= Hollywood Studio Building =

Building in Los Angeles, California, U.S.

- U.S. Historic district – Contributing property
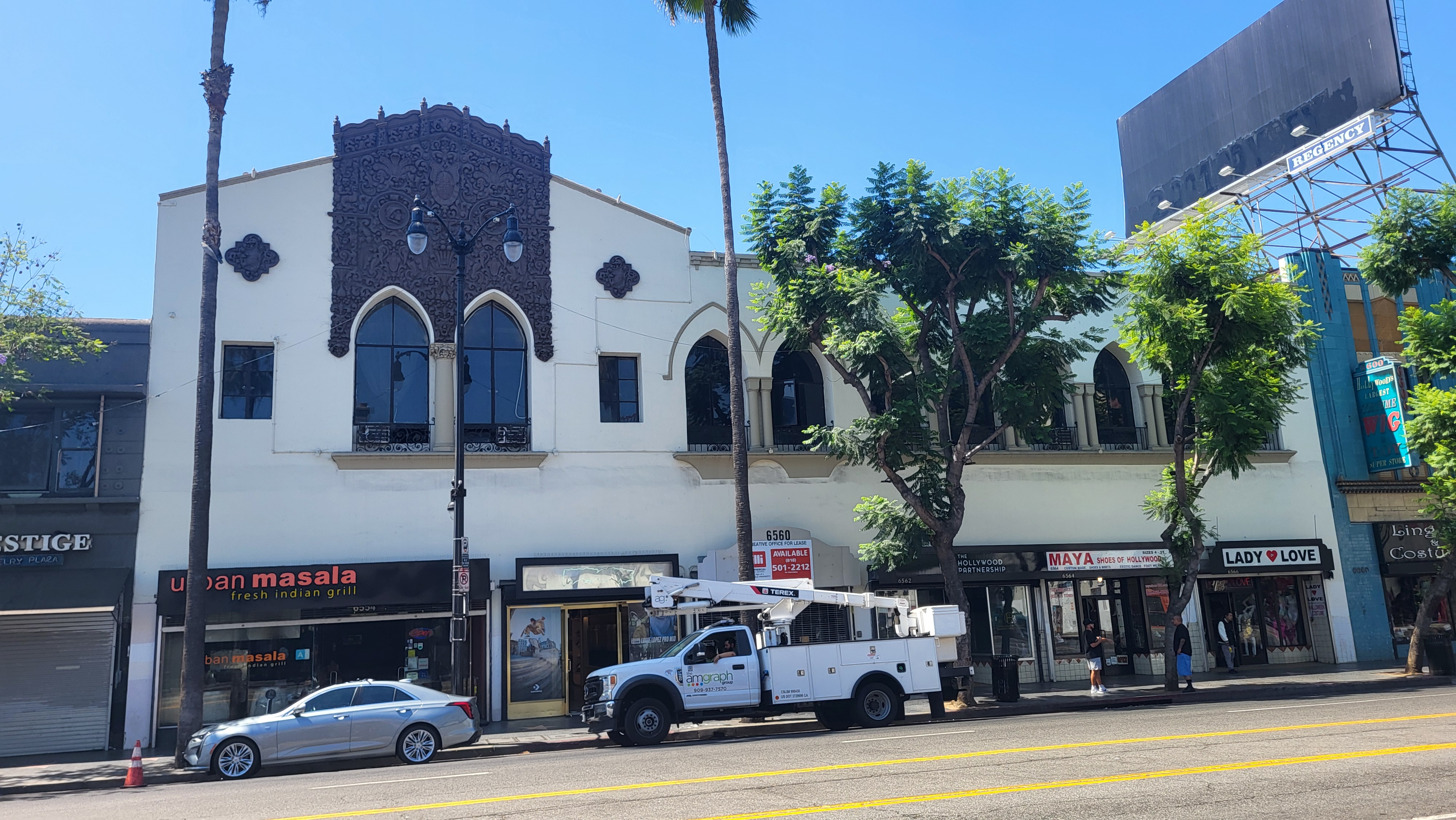
- The building in 2024

- Location within the Los Angeles metropolitan area
- Location: 6554 W. Hollywood Blvd., Hollywood, California
- Coordinates: 34.101°N 118.333°W
- Built: 1927
- Architect: Henry L. Gogerty; Carl Jules Weyl
- Architectural style: Spanish Colonial Revival
- Part of: Hollywood Boulevard Commercial and Entertainment District (ID85000704)
- Designated CP: April 4, 1985

Hollywood Studio Building, formerly the Hollywood Toys building, is a historic two-story building located at 6554 W. Hollywood Boulevard in Hollywood, California.

== History ==
Hollywood Studio Building was built in 1927 by Henry L. Gogerty and Carl Jules Weyl, the architectural duo also responsible for the nearby Palace Theater, Shane Building, and Baine Building. The building has ground-floor retail and second-story offices, with most of the offices featuring their own fireplaces.

In 1950, Hollywood Toys & Costumes moved into the building, where they would remain until the early 1990s, when they moved one building west.

In 1985, the Hollywood Boulevard Commercial and Entertainment District was added to the National Register of Historic Places, with Hollywood Toys listed as a contributing property in the district.

In March 2022, the building was re-painted to match its original color scheme.

== Architecture and design ==
Hollywood Studio Building features Spanish Colonial Revival architecture with a red tile roof and a second story that contains Churrigueresque ornament, Moorish arched windows, ornamented colonnettes between the windows, and, most prominently, a wrought iron east window.

== See also ==
- List of contributing properties in the Hollywood Boulevard Commercial and Entertainment District
