= The Cat & Fiddle =

- Interactive map of The Cat & Fiddle

Restaurant information
- Established: 1982
- Previous owner: Kim Gardner
- Food type: British cuisine
- Location: 742 N Highland Avenue, Hollywood, Los Angeles County, California, United States
- Coordinates: 34.097687°N 118.332646°W
- Website: thecatandfiddle.com

The Cat & Fiddle is British Pub and restaurant located in Hollywood, California.

The pub was originally opened in Laurel Canyon by British musician Kim Gardner in 1982. The establishment then moved into the Fred C. Thomson Building on Sunset Boulevard in 1985, where it remained for nearly 30 years. In 2014, the location was closed due to local development. The pub reopened in its current location at 742 North Highland Avenue in 2017.

Celebrities such as Rod Stewart, Robert Plant, Christopher Lloyd, Drew Barrymore and Morrissey have been regulars over the years.
