= Baine Building =

Building in Los Angeles, California, U.S.

- U.S. Historic district – Contributing property
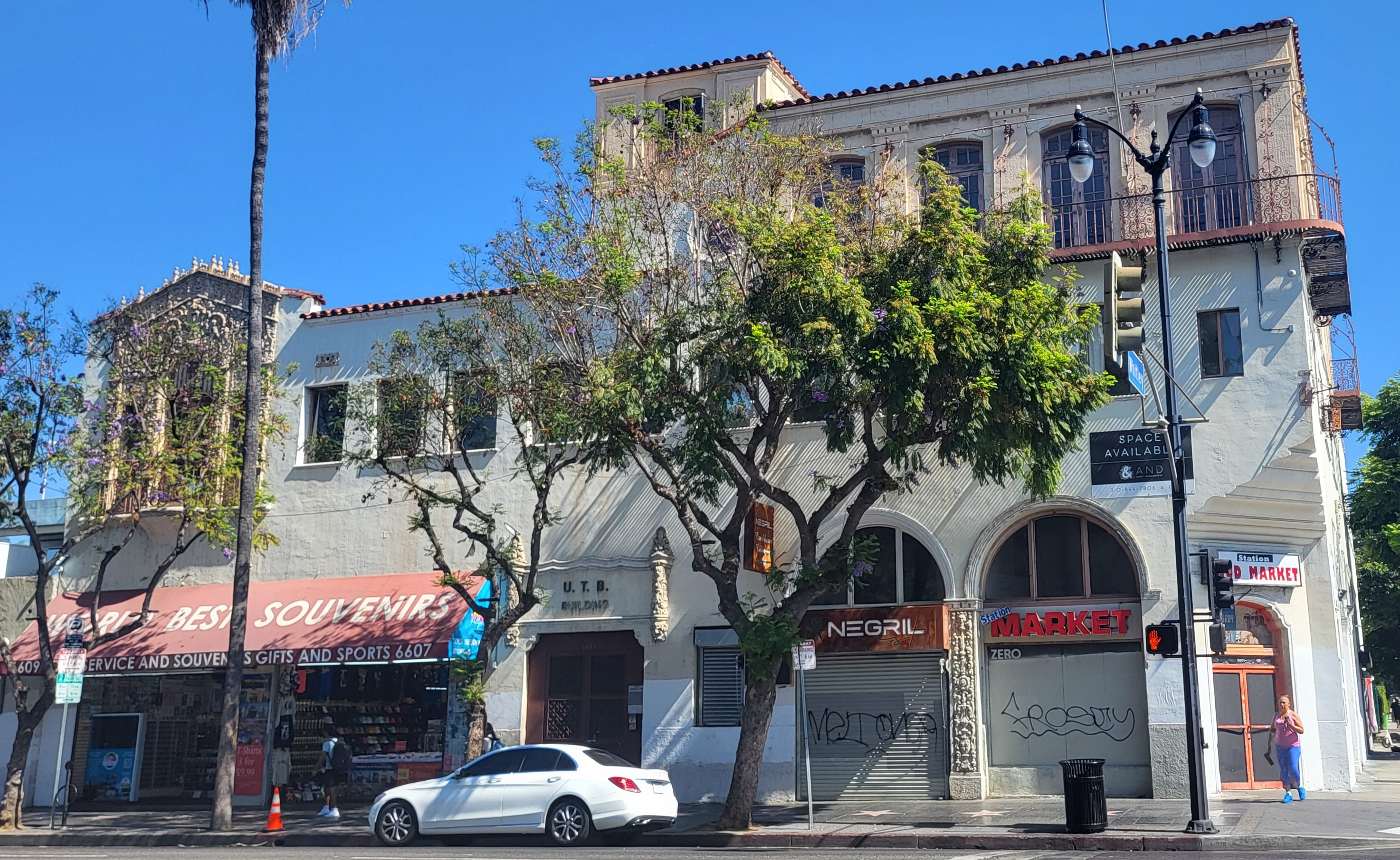
- The building in 2024

- Location within the Los Angeles metropolitan area
- Location: 6601 W. Hollywood Blvd. and 1709 Whitley Ave., Hollywood, California
- Coordinates: 34.1019°N 118.3336°W
- Built: 1926
- Architect: Henry L. Gogerty; Carl Jules Weyl
- Architectural style: Spanish Colonial Revival
- Part of: Hollywood Boulevard Commercial and Entertainment District (ID85000704)
- Designated CP: April 4, 1985

Baine Building, also known as Baine Studio Building, is a historic building located at 6601 W. Hollywood Boulevard and 1709 Whitley Avenue in Hollywood, California.

== History ==
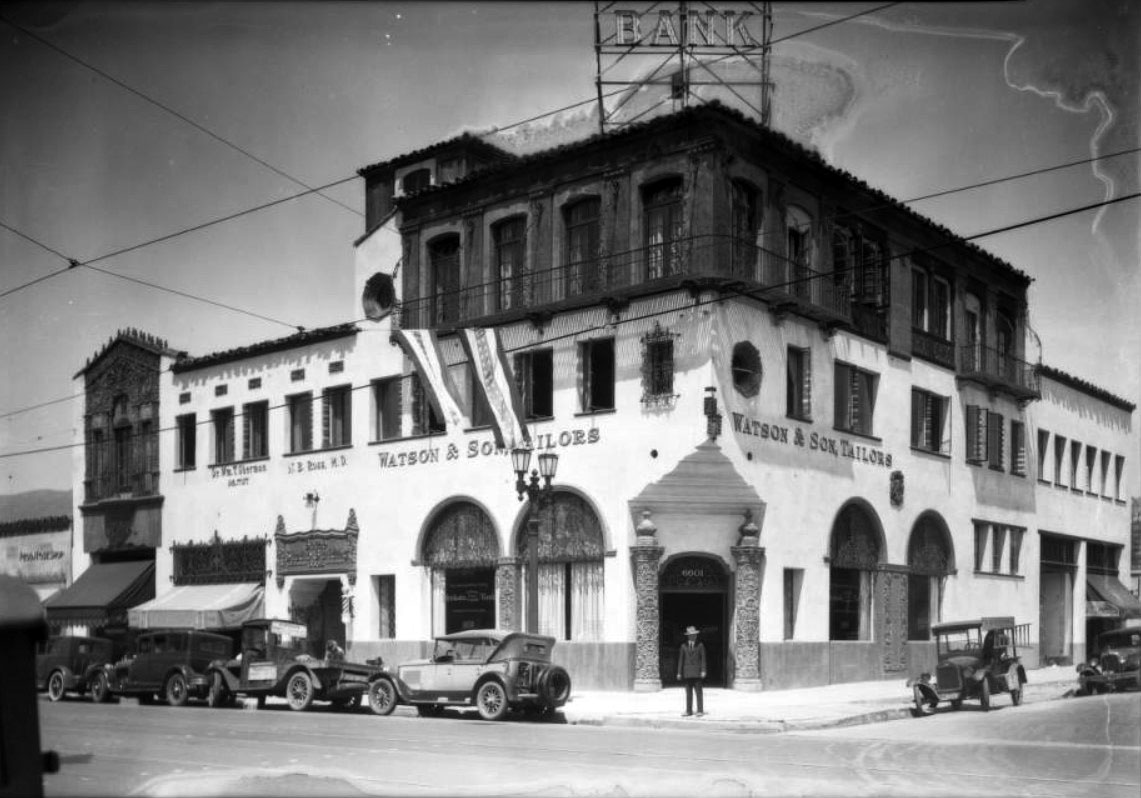
The building in 1927

Baine Building was built in 1926 by architecture firm Gogerty & Weyl, the duo also responsible for the nearby Fred C. Thomson Building and Palace Theater. This three-story building was designed in the Spanish Colonial Revival style, with Merchants National Trust and Savings Bank occupying the first two floors and building owner Harry M. Baine's penthouse on the third.

In 1985, the Hollywood Boulevard Commercial and Entertainment District was added to the National Register of Historic Places, with Baine Building listed as a contributing property in the district.

== Architecture ==
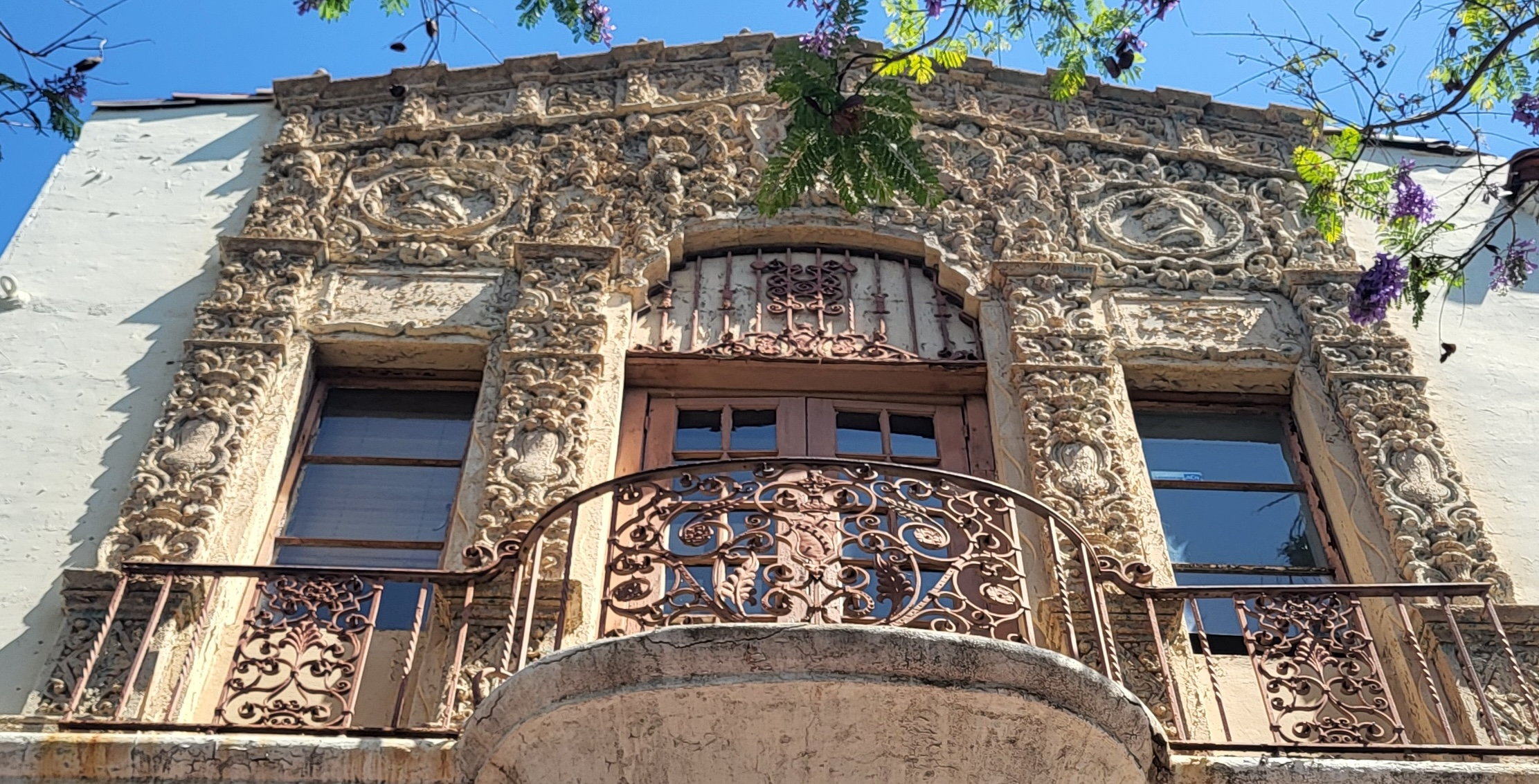
Wrought iron grillwork, Churrigueresque ornament

The United States Department of the Interior considers Baine Building a prime example of Spanish Colonial Revival. Elements of the style featured include a red tiled roof, smooth facade, wrought iron grillwork and balconies, Churrigueresque ornament, and a corner tower. The building itself is made of reinforced concrete and stucco, with ornamental pilasters, arched windows, deeply inset bulls-eye windows, and an elaborate scallop corner entrance. The second story windows, while appearing stationary, turn on a central pivot.

== In popular culture ==
The Whitley Building at Disney’s Hollywood Studios was modeled after the Baine Building and named after Whitley Avenue, the cross street the Baine Building is located on.

== See also ==
- List of contributing properties in the Hollywood Boulevard Commercial and Entertainment District
