= Johnny's Steak House Building =

Building in Los Angeles, California, U.S.

- Johnny's Steak House
- U.S. Historic district – Contributing property
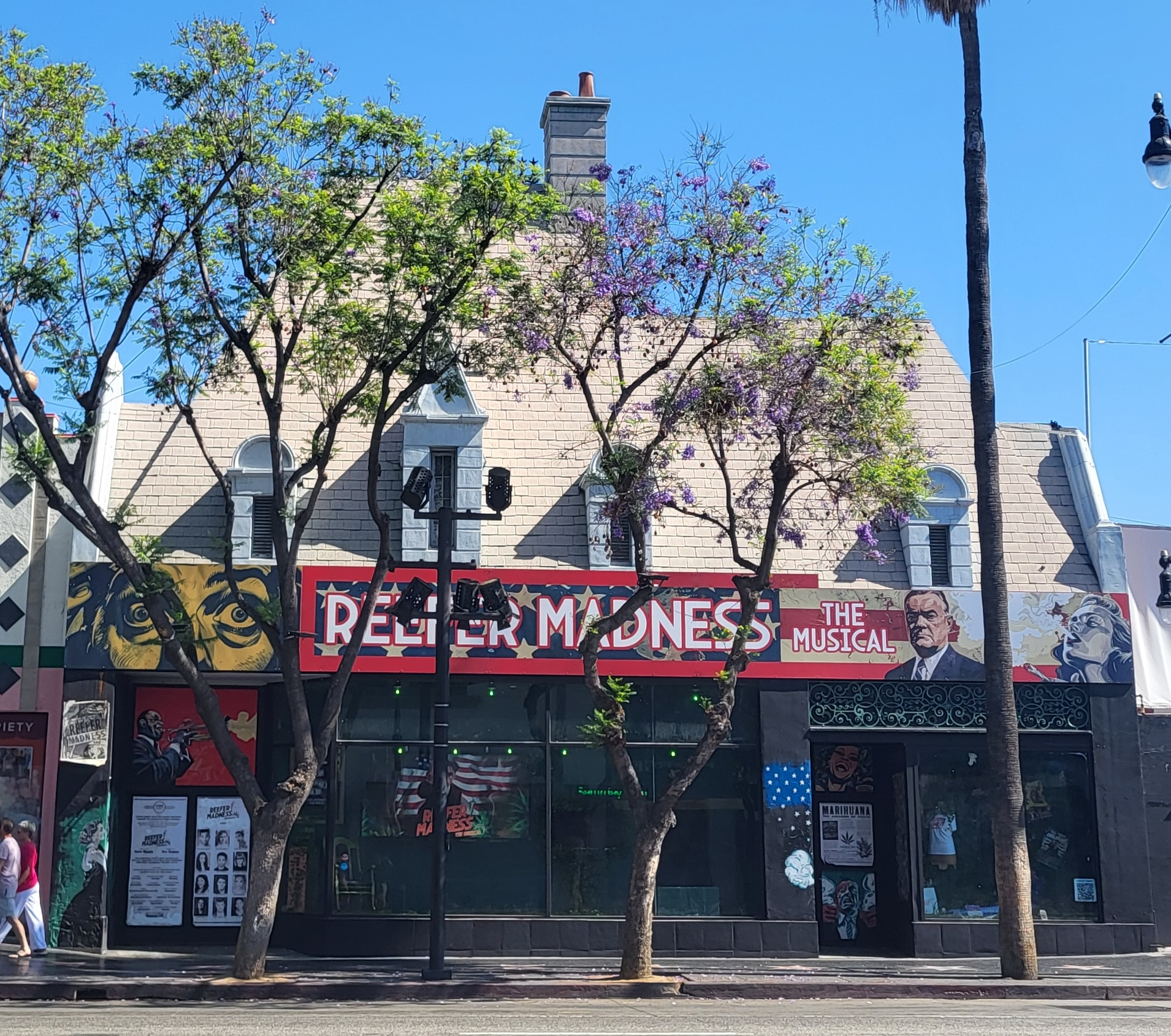
- The building in 2024

- Location within the Los Angeles metropolitan area
- Location: 6553-5 W. Hollywood Blvd., Hollywood, California
- Coordinates: 34.102°N 118.333°W
- Built: 1930
- Architect: Henry L. Gogerty
- Architectural style: Chateauesque
- Part of: Hollywood Boulevard Commercial and Entertainment District (ID85000704)
- Designated CP: April 4, 1985

Johnny's Steak House is a historic one-story building at 6553-5 W. Hollywood Boulevard in Hollywood, California. It is a contributing property in the Hollywood Boulevard Commercial and Entertainment District

== History ==
Johnny's Steak House was designed by Henry L. Gogerty and built in 1930. It formerly housed offices for Southern Pacific Railway and later the restaurant Johnny's Steak House, which was described by the Los Angeles Evening Citizen News as "not fancy but good."

In 1985, the Hollywood Boulevard Commercial and Entertainment District was added to the National Register of Historic Places, with Johnny's Steak House listed as a contributing property in the district.

== Architecture and design ==
Johnny's Steak House was designed in the Chateauesque style and features many aspects of that style, including a steep mansard roof punctuated by four dormers, curved pediments, a prominent roofline, and simulated stone.

== See also ==
- List of contributing properties in the Hollywood Boulevard Commercial and Entertainment District
