= Herman Building =

Building in Los Angeles, California, U.S.

- U.S. Historic district – Contributing property
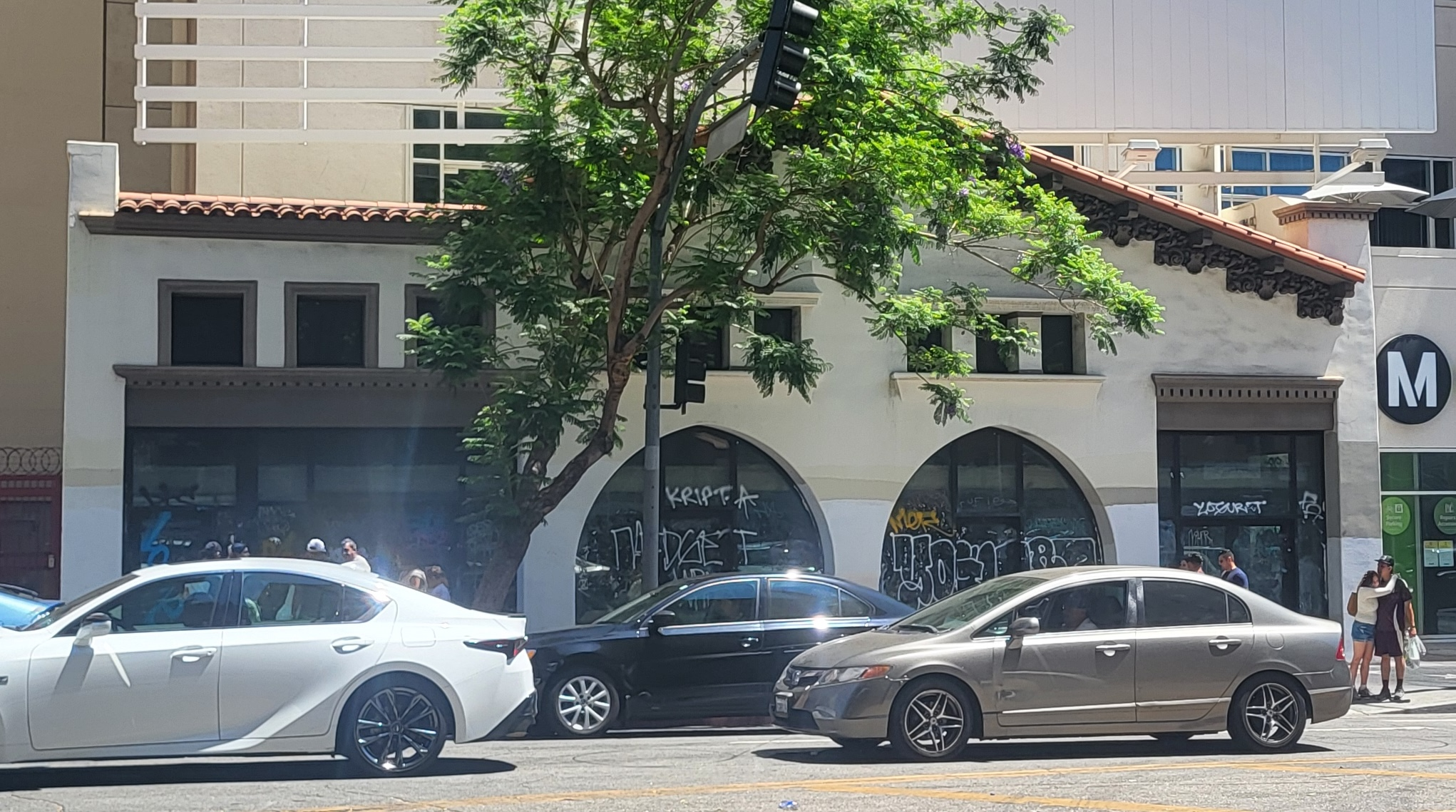
- The building in 2024

- Location within the Los Angeles metropolitan area
- Location: 1632 N. Vine St., Hollywood, California
- Coordinates: 34.101°N 118.326°W
- Built: 1928
- Architect: Carl Jules Weyl
- Architectural style: Spanish Colonial Revival
- Part of: Hollywood Boulevard Commercial and Entertainment District (ID85000704)
- Designated CP: April 4, 1985

Herman Building, also known as Bernard Luggage Building, is a historic one-story building located at 1632 N. Vine Street in Hollywood, California.

== History ==
Herman Building was built in 1928 by Carl Jules Weyl and has been home to many businesses over the years, most notably a restaurant in the 1940s-1950s called Ham & Egger. Johnny Grant broadcast a live radio show from the restaurant, where he interviewed numerous celebrities, including Bob Hope, Jimmy Durante, and Alan Young. In the 1950s, Bernard Luggage Company moved into the building, and the company's owners purchased the building twenty years later.

In 1985, the Hollywood Boulevard Commercial and Entertainment District was added to the National Register of Historic Places, with 1632 N. Vine St. listed as a contributing property in the district. In the 2000s, when the city sought to develop the area into a W Hotel & Residences, the Herman Building's owner refused to sell. The city attempted to take the building by eminent domain, but lost their case. W Hotel was then built around Herman Building, which was reconstructed and restored to its original look.

== Architecture and design ==
Herman Building features a Spanish Colonial Revival design that includes a false gable parallel to the street as its focal point and Churrigueresque ornament along the edge of the gable. The building was compatible with Hollywood Brown Derby to its south.

== See also ==
- List of contributing properties in the Hollywood Boulevard Commercial and Entertainment District
