= The Orient Building =

Building in Los Angeles, California, U.S.

- The Orient
- U.S. Historic district – Contributing property
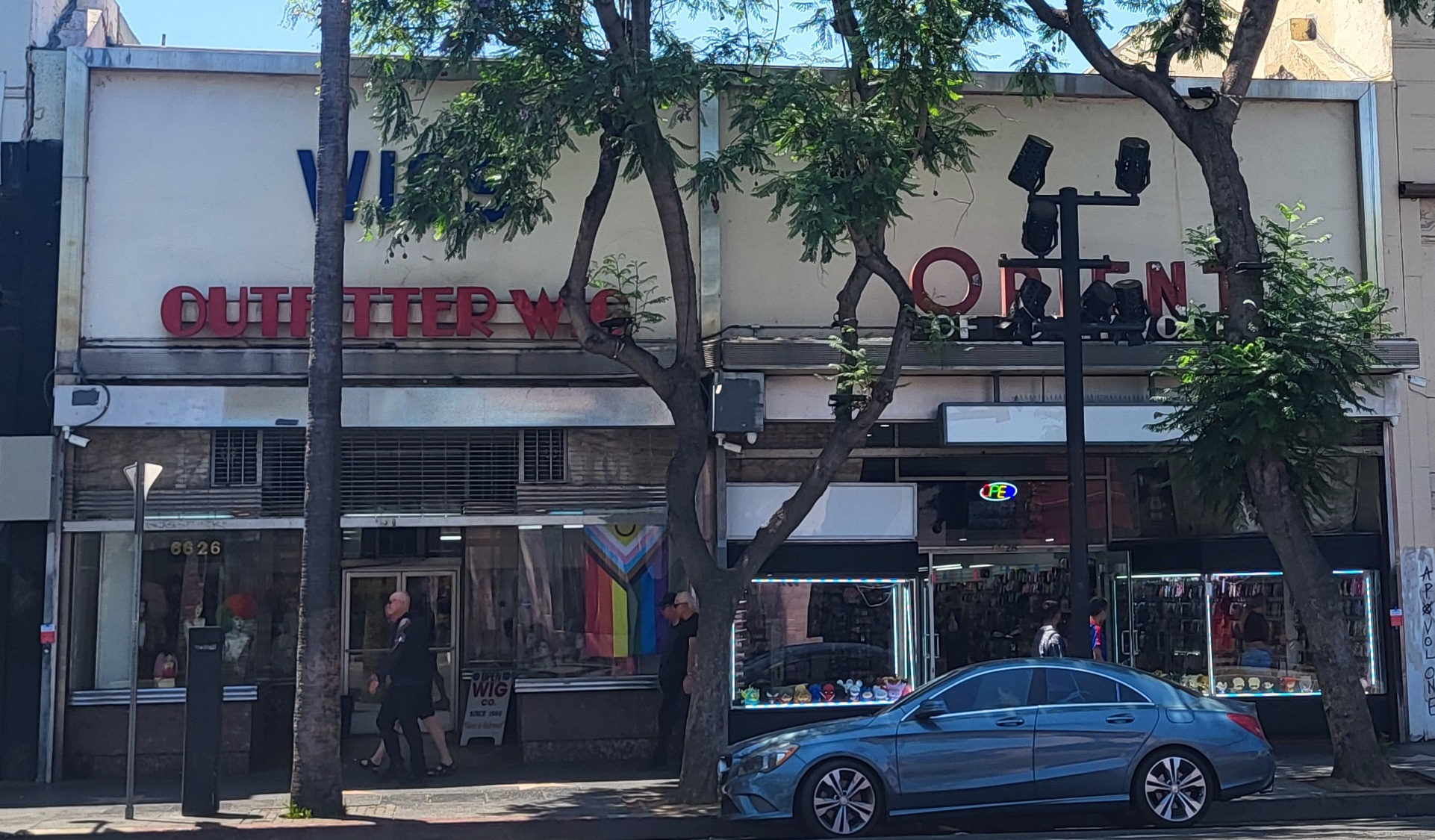
- The building in 2024

- Location within the Los Angeles metropolitan area
- Location: 6626 W. Hollywood Blvd., Hollywood, California
- Coordinates: 34.1016°N 118.3342°W
- Built: 1927, 1937
- Architectural style: Art Deco
- Part of: Hollywood Boulevard Commercial and Entertainment District (ID85000704)
- Designated CP: April 4, 1985

The Orient is a historic one-story retail building at 6626 W. Hollywood Boulevard in Hollywood, California.

== History ==
The Orient was built in 1927 and remodeled in 1937. The second location of F. & W. Grand opened in the building in 1928 and an import store named The Orient occupied the building in the 1960s.

In 1985, the Hollywood Boulevard Commercial and Entertainment District was added to the National Register of Historic Places, with The Orient listed as a contributing property in the district.

== Architecture ==
The Orient is made of concrete and small in scale, and it features colored marble and aluminum banding, giving it a modern yet faintly Art Deco look. The United States Department of the Interior describe the building as having "sleek sophistication" and being "a good example of exterior signage" on Hollywood Boulevard.

== See also ==
- List of contributing properties in the Hollywood Boulevard Commercial and Entertainment District
