= Consumer Drug Building (Hollywood, California) =

Building in Los Angeles, California, U.S.

- Consumer Drug
- U.S. Historic district – Contributing property
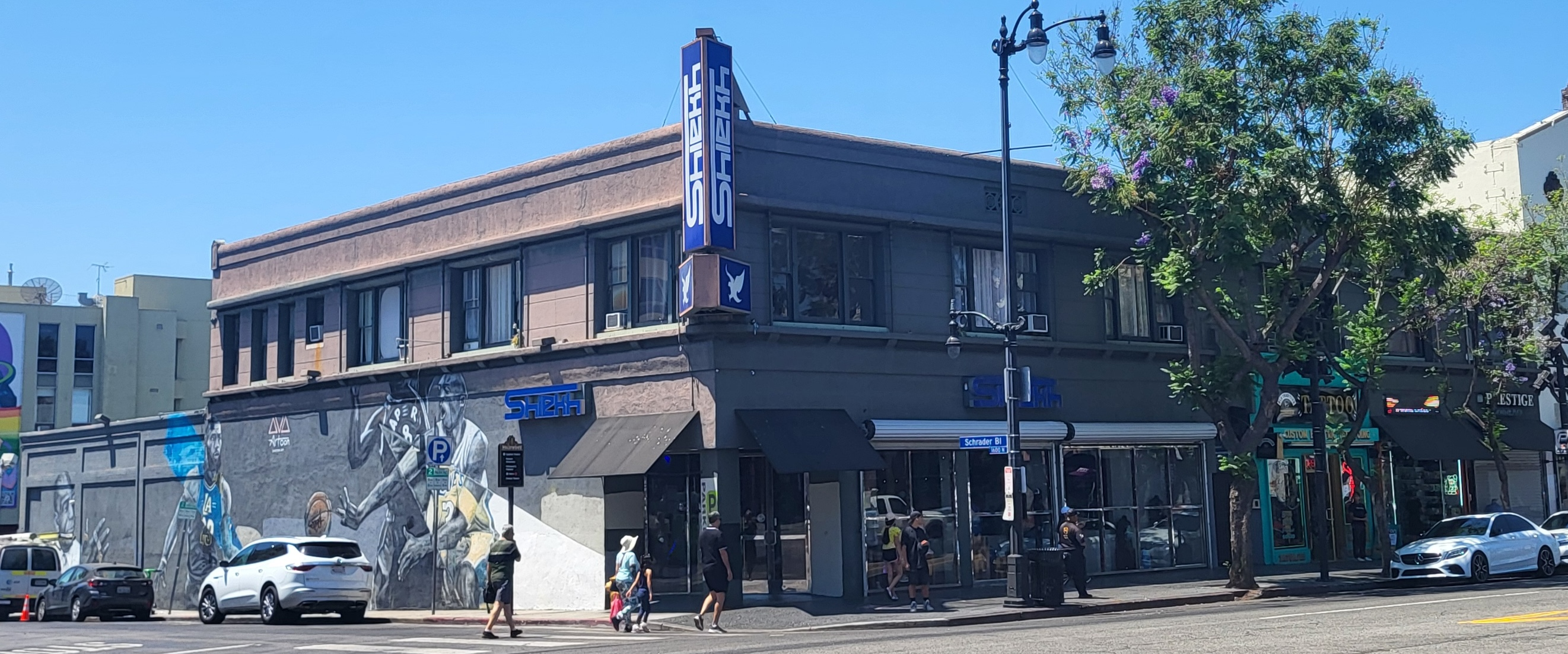
- The building in 2024

- Location within the Los Angeles metropolitan area
- Location: 6542 W. Hollywood Blvd., Hollywood, California
- Coordinates: 34.1015°N 118.3326°W
- Built: 1919 or 1928, 1938
- Architect: H. Rice
- Architectural style: Moderne
- Part of: Hollywood Boulevard Commercial and Entertainment District (ID85000704)
- Designated CP: April 4, 1985

Consumer Drug is a historic two-story building located at 6542 W. Hollywood Boulevard in Hollywood, California.

== History ==
Consumer Drug was built in 1919 or 1928 and redesigned in the Moderne style in 1938. The building originally housed a drug store and it housed a drug store in 1957 as well.

In 1985, the Hollywood Boulevard Commercial and Entertainment District was added to the National Register of Historic Places, with Consumer Drug listed as a contributing property in the district.

== Architecture and design ==
Consumer Drug is made of brick and features a Moderne design that retains simplified detailing associated with its style, including a vertical band between the first and second stories that serves as a modified stringcourse and symmetrically arranged and unadorned upper-story windows.

== See also ==
- List of contributing properties in the Hollywood Boulevard Commercial and Entertainment District
