= California Laundry =

Laundry business in Hollywood, California, US

Coordinates: 34°5′24″N 118°19′35″W

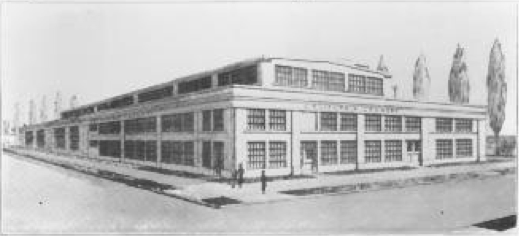
- Image of the California Laundry, unknown date.
- Industry: Laundry
- Founded: 1921
- Headquarters: Hollywood, California

California Laundry was an early 1920s business in Hollywood, California, and in its day, possibly the city's largest business institution outside of the film studios. It was located on Vine Street. At the time it was established, the California Laundry was one of the few laundry businesses in the country in which each machine was driven by an individual motor, eliminating the possibility of a breakdown which would cripple the entire plant. The machinery used in the California Laundry was the largest single shipment of laundry apparatus ever sent to the Pacific coast.

== Location ==
The owners acquired the entire block on which the plant was located. Situated just south of Santa Monica Boulevard, the property had a frontage of 284 feet (87 m) on Vine Street. Parking was available on Vine Street and Eleanor Avenue.

== History ==
Established in 1921, the laundry, representing an investment of $225,000, was an important addition to the industrial section of Hollywood. The machinery used in the California Laundry was the largest single shipment of laundry apparatus ever sent to the Pacific coast, and was bought at an expense of $126,000, not including the boilers and water heat controlling machines. Initially, 70 people were employed. For the first three months, they worked without phone connections. Expecting that the plant would have to be enlarged, the company owned the property just west of their initial building, allowing for expansion.

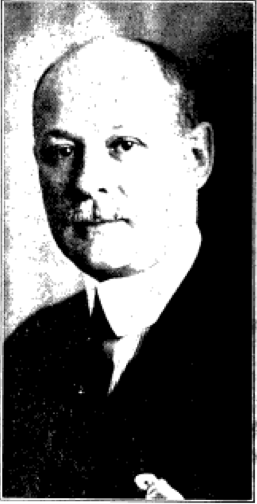
Henry Newby

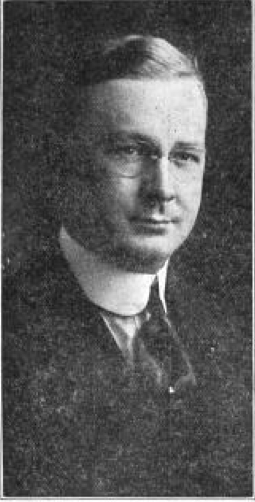
D. N. Childers

The business was directed by Henry Newby and D. N. Childers. Newby, the president, was associated with banking institutions in Pasadena, California for twenty-five years. He resigned as chairman of the National Bank of Pasadena when he became assistant manager of the Hotel Alexandria, of Los Angeles. He was a director of the Troy Laundry Company, operating the Troy Laundry at Pasadena. Childers, the vice-president and manager, resigned his position as manager of the laundry of the Hotel Alexandria, a position that he had held for two years, to start up the California Laundry. Before becoming manager of the Hotel Alexandria's laundry, Childers was superintendent of the San Bernardino Steam Laundry at San Bernardino. The construction of the California Laundry plant had been under his direct supervision. Charles Greenberg, a Hollywood attorney, was secretary. J. A. Henley, Roy A. Henley, Frank G. Hogan, and L. J. Killian were on the board of directors.

== Operations ==
The laundry operated in a rotary fashion. Each of the drivers of the 26 trucks deposited his bundles in bins, from which they were taken to the marking and sorting rooms. Here all silks, woolens, and fancy pieces were removed to be washed by hand.

The plant operated 10 washers. Among the other machinery were two large flat work ironers, an 8 inches (200 mm) handkerchief ironer, two drying tumblers, nine pressing machines, and a curtain dryer. The clothing was washed in revolving machines, in filtered water with pure soap, and rinsed five times. The wringers were centrifugal. The thermostatic control heater kept the water at all times less than 180 degrees, while the water filtering tanks removed the elements harmful to linens and other materials. The room next to that in which these tanks were located on the second floor was the store room, which contained barrels of starch, automobile tires, paper boxes, and almost a ton of twine. There was a large dryer, made especially for bath towels, which dried them by a hot air process. The flat work was protected in the mangles by canvas belts and aprons. Men's shirts were mended and the cuffs turned if worn along the fold. Stockings were dried and shaped at the same time on metal forms. A stiff collar required more steps in the process of being laundered than any other article. Two tanks, each of 1400 gallons capacity, contained soap flakes with the appropriate amount of water. These 2800 gallons lasted only two days at the most. The rough-dry work was done in a different part of the building, and the accounting for this department was kept separately. One person was employed for placing new satin ribbon of different colors in ladies' garments, and tying blankets with ribbon bows.

== Architecture and fittings ==
The one-story plant building measured 110 by 150 feet (34 m × 46 m) in size, and was of reinforced concrete construction. There was a mezzanine floor on three sides. The ceiling measured 37 feet (11 m) in height, and the sides were largely made up of windows. The all white exterior was surrounded with lawn, flowers, and shrubs. A pergola, 110 feet (34 m) in length, reached from the southern extremity of the building to Romaine Street and was intended as a dining area for employees. On two sides of the building, there was a wide concrete driveway.

The interior of the building was finished in white, with the exception of the steel rafters high up in the center of the building, these having been painted a light green. The fixtures were also painted white. There was no overhead belt or shaft in the entire plant, as every machine was motor driven. The electrical work was under the floor. All the pipes which ran through the plant had an asbestos covering. The rough dry department occupied a space 50 by 80 feet (15 m × 24 m) in the rear of the building. In one corner of the plant was a boiler room, with all condensation trapped back to the boiler. A reinforced wall, inside the building and against the rear wall, made an enclosure 50 by 80 feet (15 m × 24 m) and above this was an additional story for the water softening plant, as well as the soap and bleach making equipment. The marking room, measuring 25 by 50 feet (7.6 m × 15.2 m), was on the mezzanine floor running along the west side of the building. It employed an elevator to bring the work from the first floor to the marking room. It also contained a system of chutes. The mezzanine floor also contained a storeroom, 25 by 50 feet (7.6 m × 15.2 m); across one wall of it, lockers with shelves were used for smaller supplies. A dining room and kitchen were also situated on that floor, running across the east side of the building.

The plant had three furnished offices. On the first floor was a public office, opening on Vine Street; situated on the mezzanine floor above was a general office and the private office of Newby and Childers. A dressing room for men employees opened into a bath room equipped with shower baths on the west side of the building. There was a large locker room, a clinic, and a dining room.

== Bibliography ==
- Donaldson, Orren M. (1922). Hollywood. Vol. 11 (Public domain ed.). Holly Leaves.
- National Laundry Journal, Incorporated (1921). National Laundry and Dry Cleaner. Vol. 86 (Public domain ed.). Chicago: Dowst Brothers Company.
