= American Musical and Dramatic Academy =

Private college conservatory for the performing arts

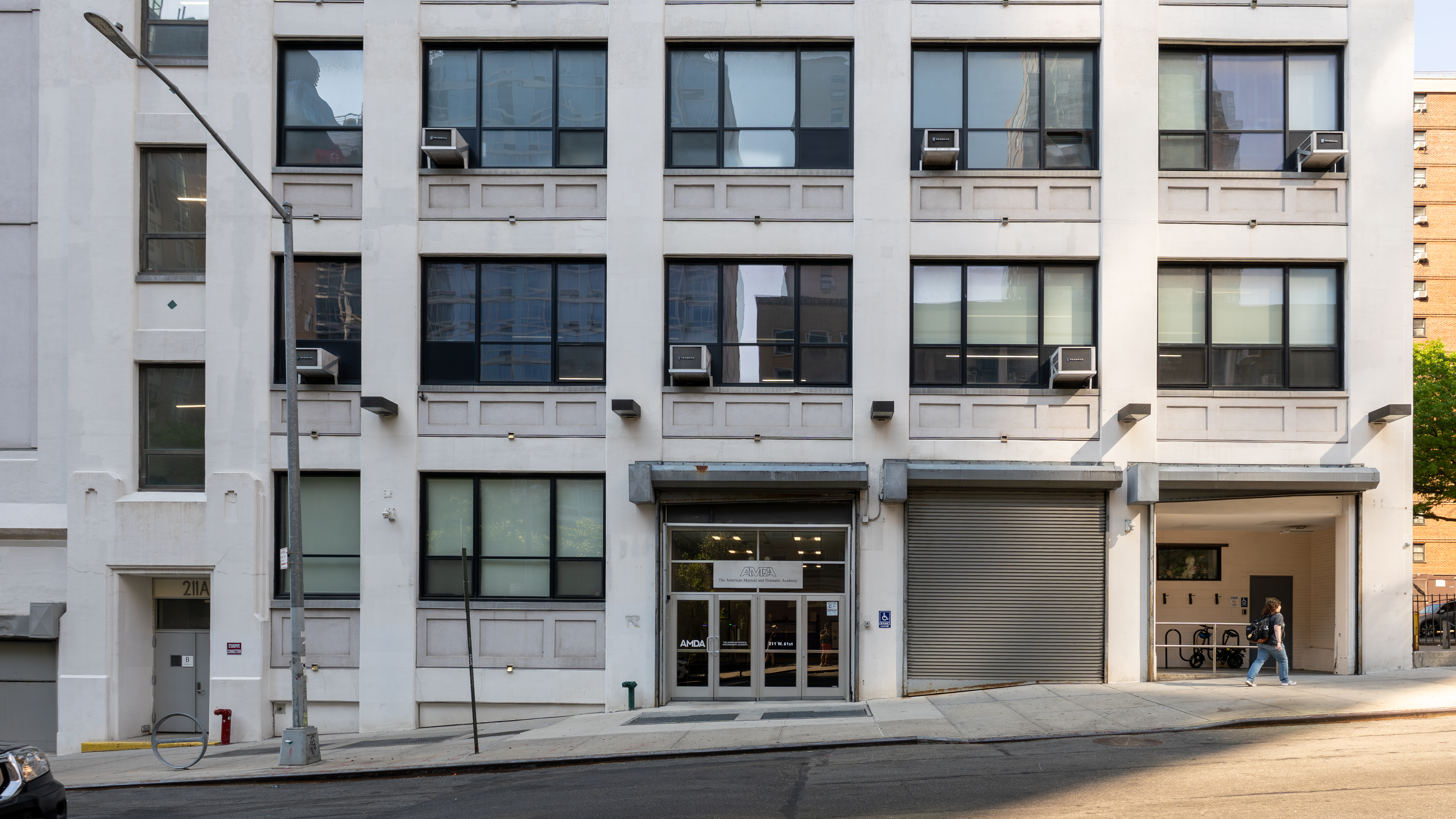
- Type: Private conservatory for the performing arts
- Established: 1964
- Accreditation: WSCUC
- President: David Martin
- Students: 1666 (approx.)
- Location: New York City, New York, and Los Angeles, California, United States; 40°46′20″N 73°59′15″W
- Campus: Urban
- Colors: Blue and white
- Website: www.amda.edu
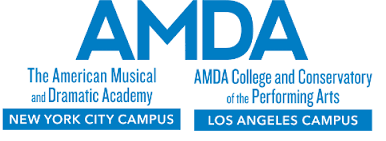

The American Musical and Dramatic Academy (AMDA) is a private conservatory for the performing arts in New York City, New York, and Los Angeles, California. The conservatory offers master's degrees, bachelor's degrees, associate degrees, and certificates in professional performance. AMDA is accredited by the WASC Senior College and University Commission (WSCUC)

== History ==
AMDA was founded in 1964 by Philip Burton and the New York theatre community. By 1970, the school had outgrown its original location on East 23rd Street and moved into a new building on Bleecker Street in Greenwich Village. A few years later, further growth prompted a move to the Ansonia Building. In the 1990s, a second location (which has become the principal location of AMDA New York) was opened near Lincoln Center.

In 2003, the school expanded west, opening AMDA Los Angeles in the Vine Tower Building.

== Campuses ==
The New York City campus is located on the Upper West Side of Manhattan. The principal facility is located at 211 West 61st Street, to the west of Lincoln Center. The other half of the campus is located at the Ansonia building on West 73rd Street.

The Los Angeles campus is located in the Hollywood Entertainment District with its principal facility in the Yucca Vine Tower at 6305 Yucca Street, Los Angeles, CA 90028.

AMDA's Los Angeles has multiple facilities for administration, classes for students and multiple theatres and amenities such rehearsal space, film, TV and editing facilities, a library, the AMDA Café, and the campus piazza.

== Notable alumni ==
- Nina Arianda
- Marissa Bode
- Bevin Bru
- Nicole Byer
- Tyne Daly
- Bailey De Young
- Honey Davenport
- Jason Derulo
- Asia Kate Dillon
- Erik Estrada
- Mike Faist
- Jesse Tyler Ferguson
- Ray Fisher
- Phillip Garcia
- Christopher Jackson
- Neil Kaplan
- Hailey Kilgore
- Caissie Levy
- Rizwan Manji
- Carolyne Mas
- Gretchen Mol
- Janelle Monáe
- Anthony Ramos
- Paul Sorvino
- Lee Tergesen
- Becca Tobin
- Michelle Visage
- Marissa Jaret Winokur
- Joy Woods
- Michael-Leon Wooley
- Natalie Zea
