= Vine Street =

Street in Hollywood, Los Angeles, United States

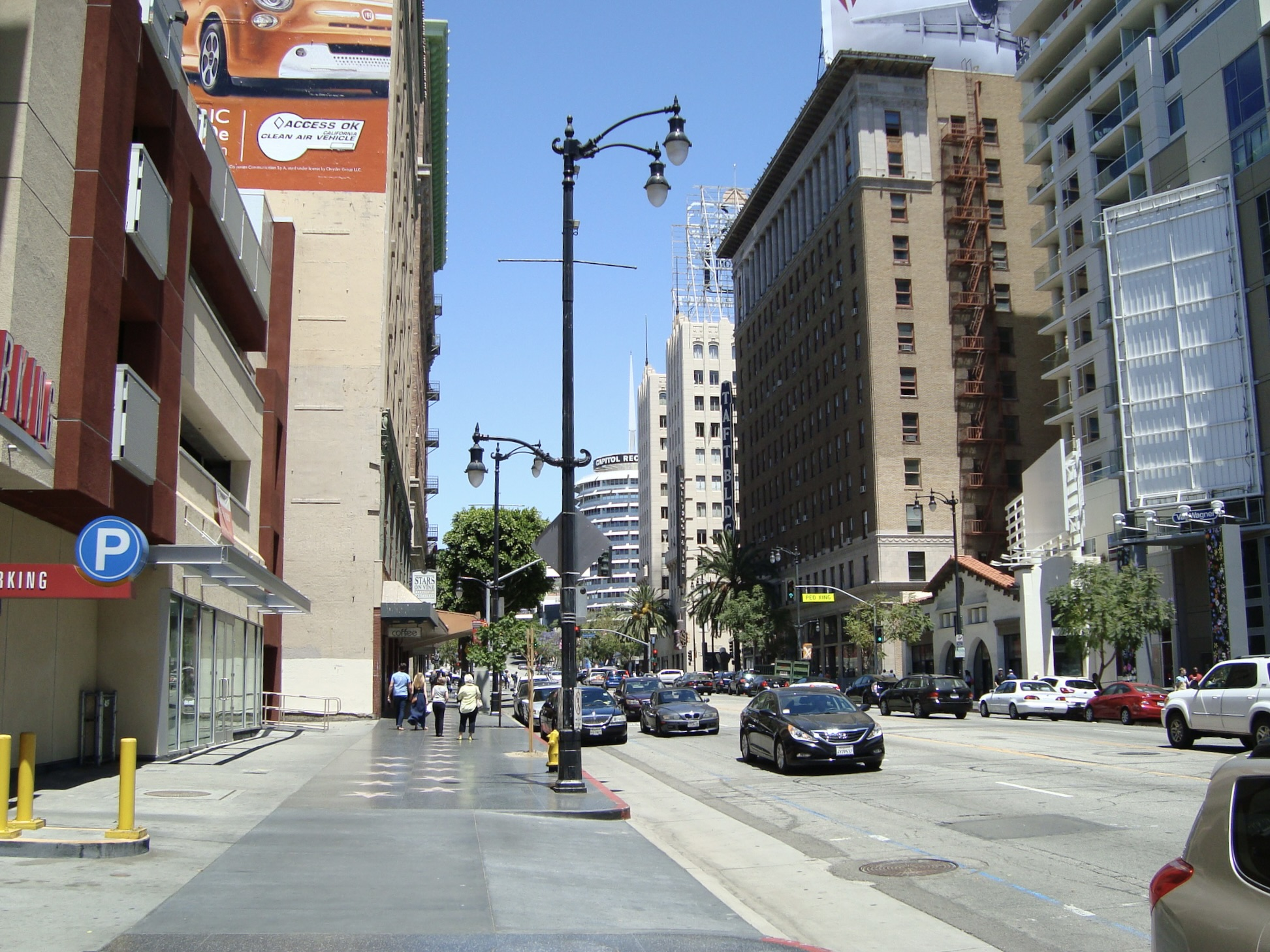
- Vine Street in Hollywood in 2014
- Interactive map of Vine Street
- Type: Street
- Maintained by: Bureau of Street Services, City of L.A. DPW
- Length: 2 mi (3.2 km)
- Location: Hollywood, Los Angeles, California
- Nearest metro station: Hollywood/Vine
- South end: Melrose Avenue in Los Angeles
- North end: Ivarene Avenue in Los Angeles

Other
- Known for: Hollywood and Vine; Hollywood Walk of Fame

Vine Street is a street in Hollywood, Los Angeles, California, that runs north–south between Franklin Avenue, Los Angeles, and Melrose Avenue. The intersection of Hollywood and Vine, symbolic of Hollywood itself, has been redeveloped. Three blocks of the Hollywood Walk of Fame lie along this street with names such as John Lennon, Johnny Carson, and John Belushi. South of Melrose Avenue, Vine turns into Rossmore Avenue, a residential Hancock Park thoroughfare that ends at Wilshire Boulevard.

== Radio Row ==
In contrast to other American cities, where it referred to a concentration of radio stores, in Los Angeles, Radio Row was understood in the 1940s and 1950s as the area around the intersection of Sunset Boulevard and Vine Street in Hollywood, where the broadcasting facilities of all four major radio networks were located. The last radio station to broadcast from a studio on Vine Street, KNX-AM, closed its Vine Street studio in 2005.

== Landmarks ==
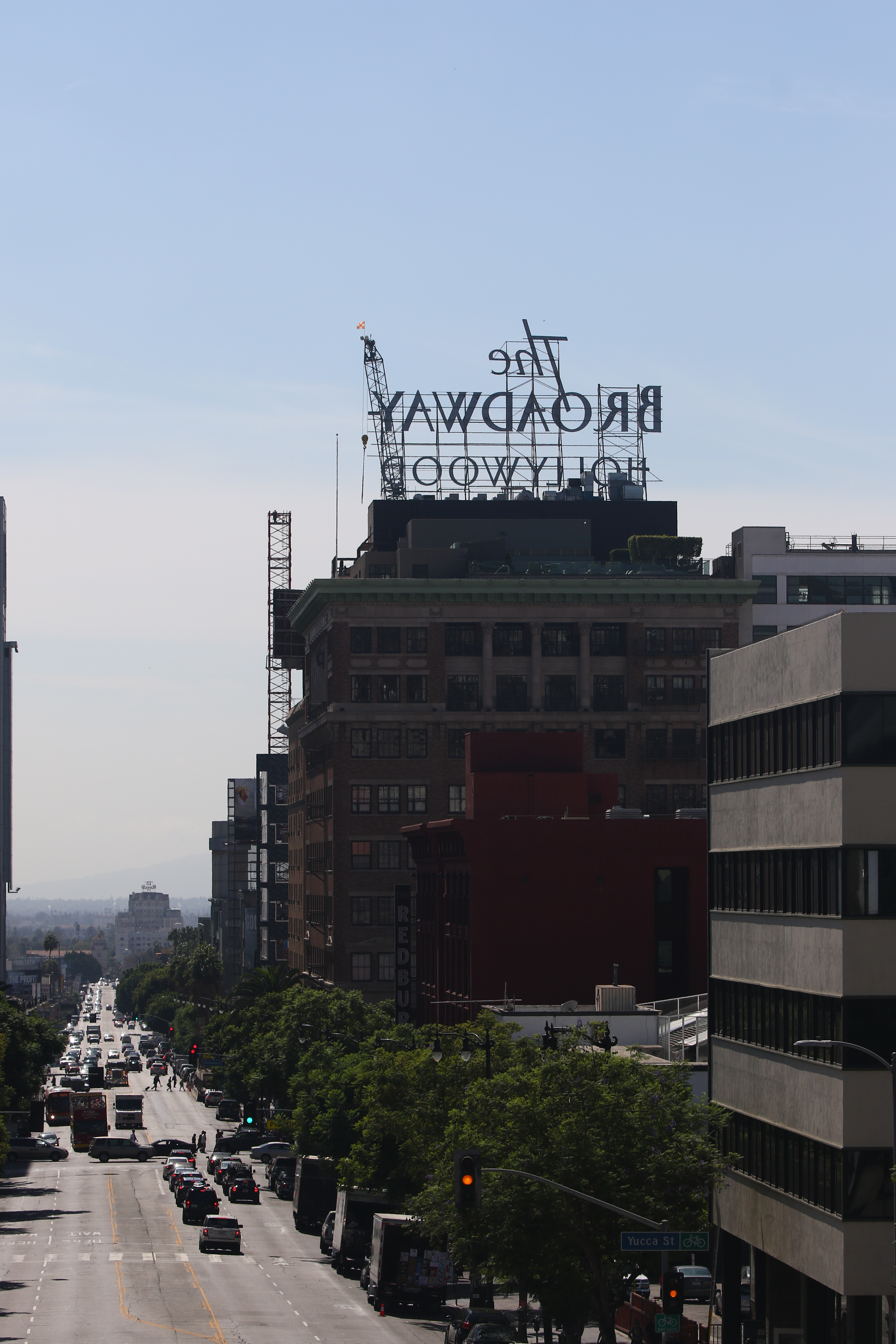
Vine Street from near its northern terminus with the Broadway Hollywood Building prominently in view

Several Los Angeles Historic-Cultural Monuments are located on Vine Street: the Hollywood Walk of Fame, Hollywood Plaza Hotel, Villa Elaine, Capitol Records Building, Musicians Union of Hollywood Building, Hollywood Home Savings and Loan, and Yucca Vine Tower. Other notable buildings on or abutting Vine Street include Equitable Building of Hollywood, Taft Building, Herman Building, Avalon Hollywood, Ricardo Montalban Theater, Netflix on Vine, and the Pickford Center for Motion Picture Study.

The California Laundry was located on the street in 1920s. Laemmle Building, Hollywood Memorial Church, and Hollywood Brown Derby were also formerly located on Vine Street.

== Public transit ==
An underground station for the Metro B Line is located one block east at Hollywood Boulevard and Argyle Avenue. Metro Local line 210 serves Vine Street and Rossmore Avenue.
