= Fred C. Thomson Building =

Office building in Los Angeles, California

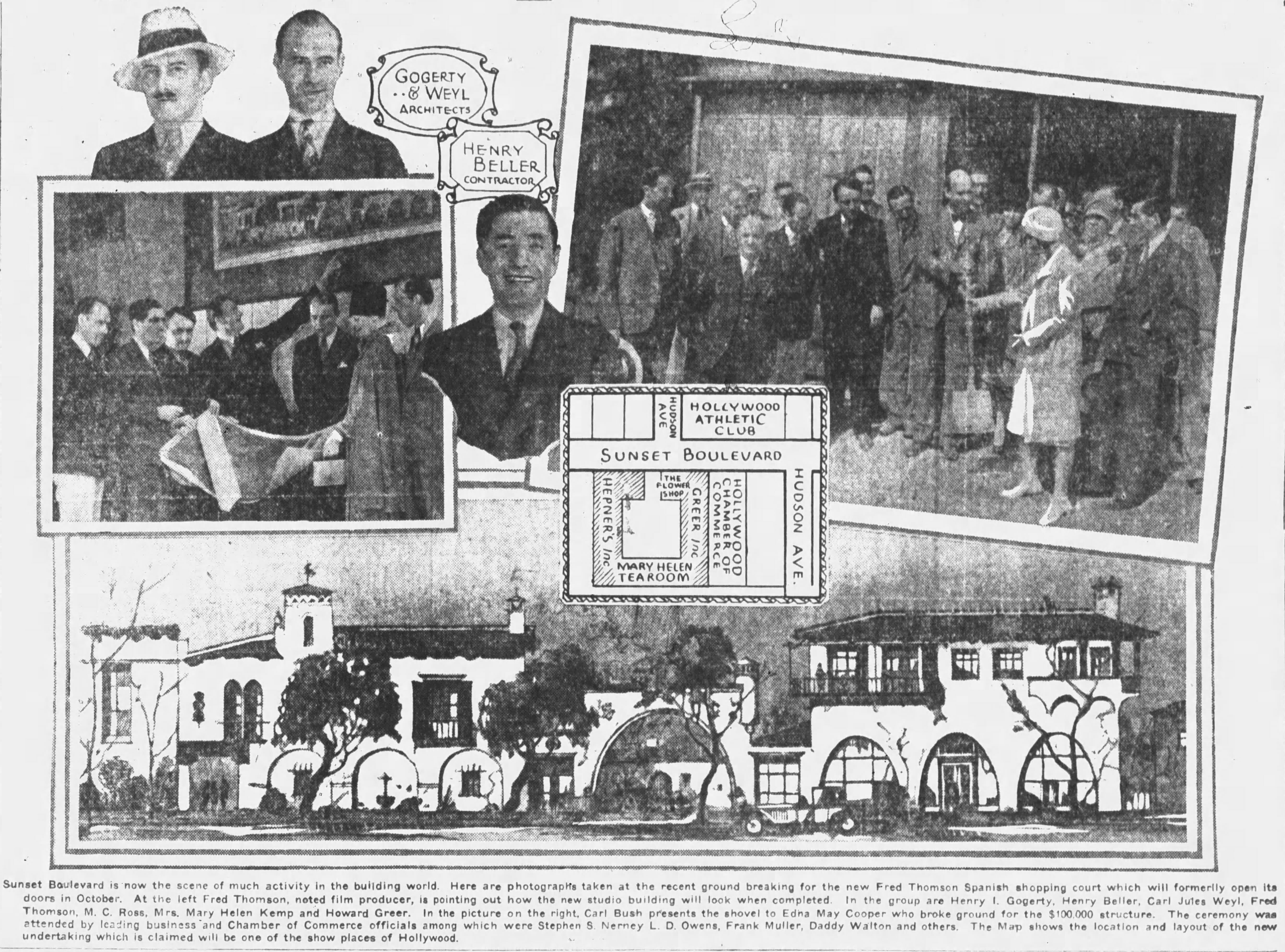
- Hollywood Citizen News excerpt about the building, 1927

General information
- Architectural style: Spanish Colonial Revival
- Location: 6528 West Sunset Boulevard, Hollywood, Los Angeles, California
- Coordinates: 34.0979°N 118.3326°W
- Named for: Fred C. Thomson
- Completed: 1927

Design and construction
- Architects: Gogerty and Weyl

Los Angeles Historic-Cultural Monument
- Designated: November 5, 2019
- Reference no.: 1196

Fred C. Thomson Building, also known as the Court of Olive, is a historic retail building located at 6528 West Sunset Boulevard in Hollywood, Los Angeles, California.

== History ==
Fred C. Thomson Building was designed by the architectural partnership Gogerty and Weyl for silent film star Fred Thomson and his journalist and screenwriter wife Frances Marion. It was built in 1927-1928 at a cost of $100,000 ($1.85 million in 2025) and its original tenants included Mary Helen Tea Room, Sunshine of Hollywood, Kepners hair salon, and offices for Weyl. The building also housed Travis Benton's (head of Paramount Studios' costume department) studio and store during its early years.

Fred Thomson died in 1928, after which the building was sold to Franklin Rice, who owned it until his death in 1949. The building was then purchased by Edgar Bergen, who broadcast The Charlie McCarthy Show from it intermittently for the next seven years.

The Cat & Fiddle occupied the building from 1985 to 2014, and it has since been home to April Bloomfield's The Hearth and Hound.

The building was designated Los Angeles Historic-Cultural Monument No. 1196 in 2019.

== Architecture and design ==
Fred C. Thomson building features Spanish Colonial Revival architecture and is considered an excellent and intact example of the style. Elements of the style featured in the building include smooth stucco wall cladding, multi-lite wood casement windows, and a hipped red-tiled roof. Additional distinguishing features of the building include an interior courtyard, ornamental wall cutouts, arched window openings, and decorative wrought iron.

== See also ==
- List of Los Angeles Historic-Cultural Monuments in Hollywood
