= Henry L. Gogerty =

American architect (1894–1990)

- Born: January 30, 1894; Zearing, Iowa
- Died: April 1, 1990 (aged 96); Los Angeles County, California
- Occupation: Architect
- Buildings: Palace Theater; Baine Building; Hollywood Studio Building; Fred C. Thomson Building; Yucca Vine Tower; Johnny's Steak House

Henry L. Gogerty (January 30, 1894 – April 1, 1990) was an American architect. He is best known for designing over 350 schools and industrial buildings in Southern California, as well as designing or co-designing numerous historic buildings in Hollywood.

== Biography ==
=== Early life ===
He was born on January 30, 1894, in Zearing, Iowa. He received a Liberal Arts certificate from the University of Dubuque in 1913, graduated from the University of Illinois at Urbana–Champaign in 1917, and later received a degree in architecture from the University of Southern California. During the First World War, he served in the field artillery.

=== Career ===
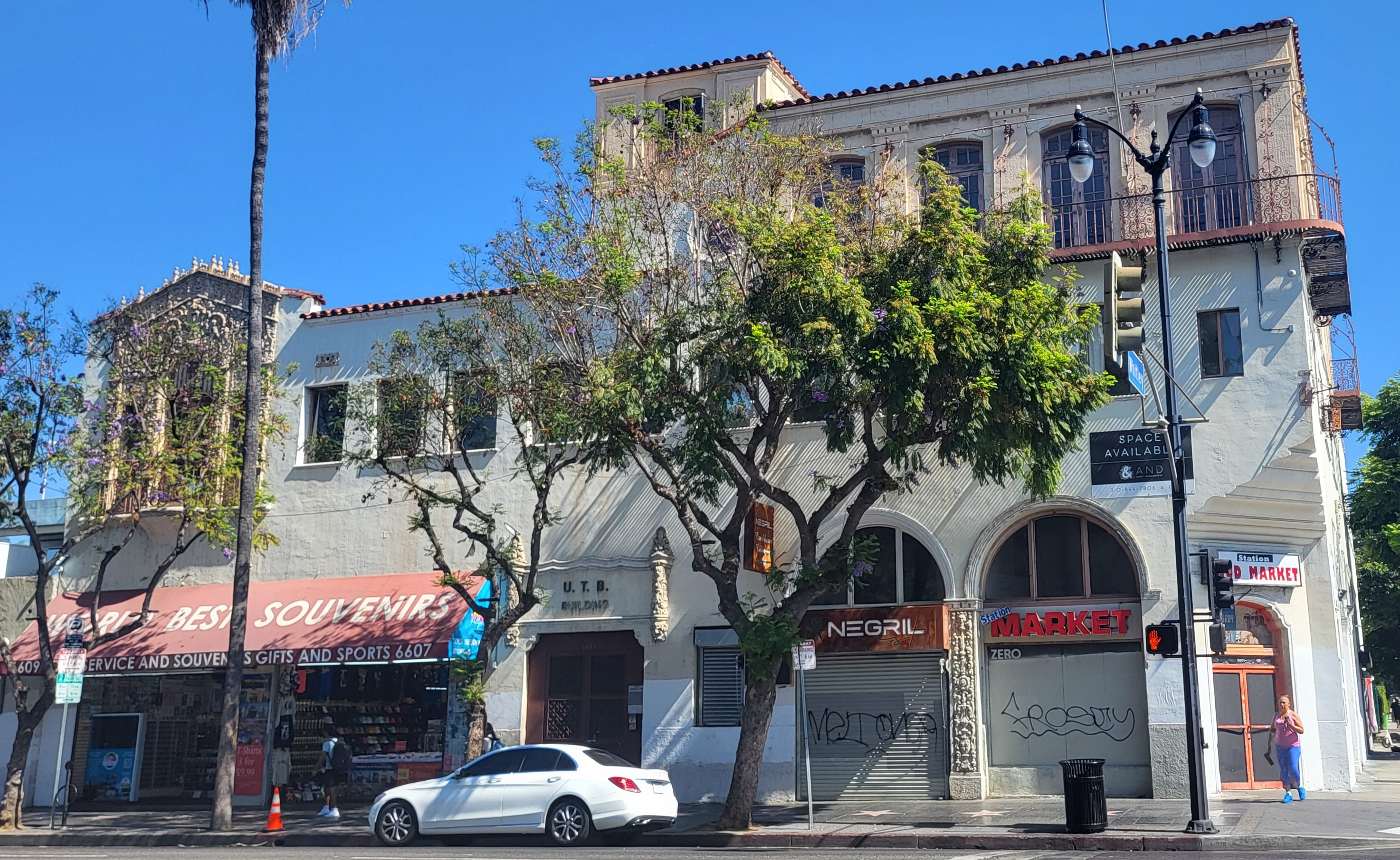
Baine Building

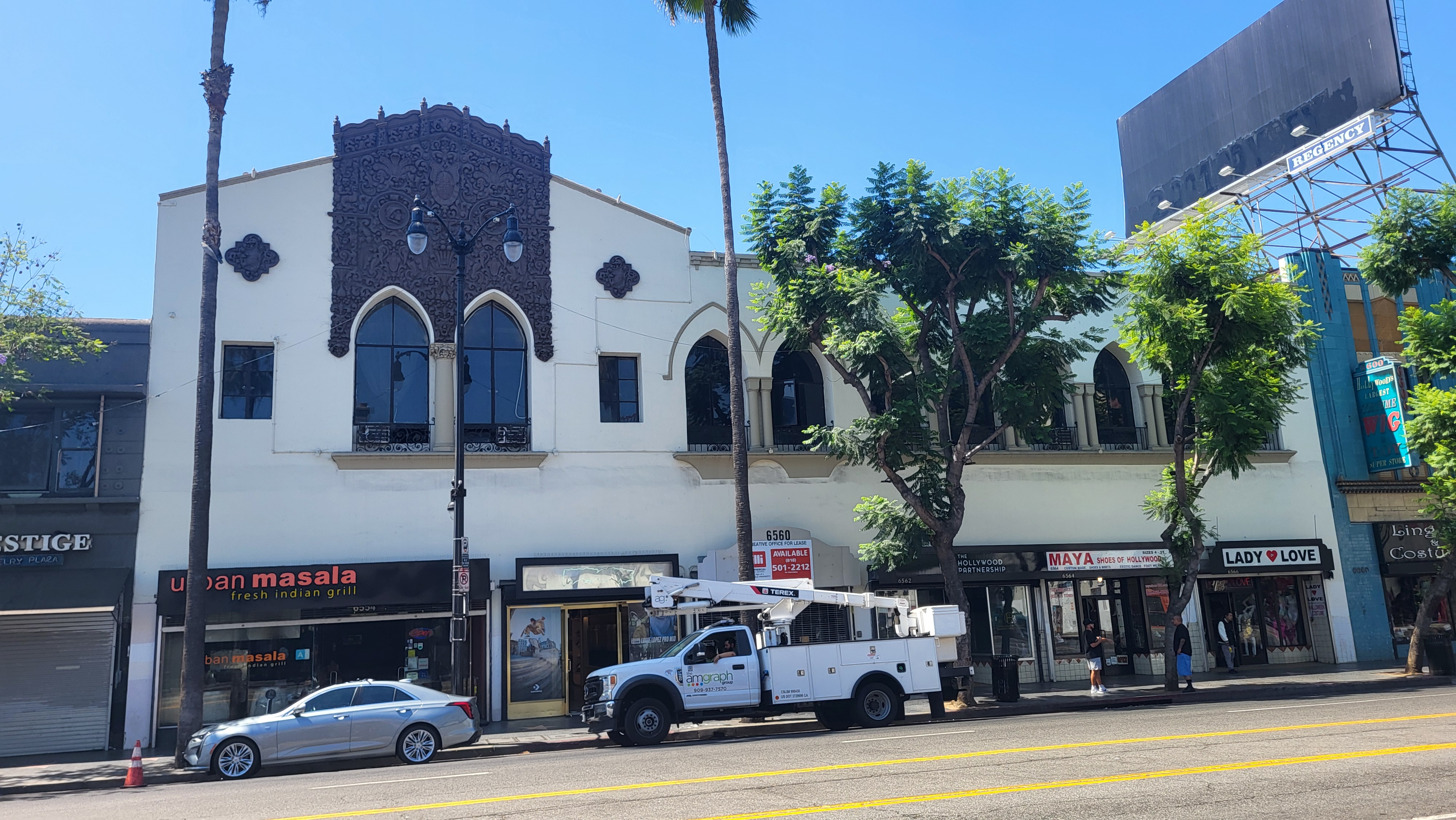
Hollywood Studio Building

Together with Carl Jules Weyl (1890-1948), he designed numerous buildings in Hollywood, California, including:

- Palace Theater (1926), NRHP-listed
- Baine Building (1926), NRHP-listed
- Hollywood Studio Building (1927), NRHP-listed
- 6356 Sunset Blvd. (1927)
- 6600 Sunset Blvd. (1928)
- Fred C. Thomson Building (1928), LAHCM No. 1196

He also designed many school buildings in California, including:

- Susan Miller Dorsey High School (1936-1938), Los Angeles
- Union High School (1950), Visalia
- New buildings for Gardena High School (1956), Gardena, together with D. Stewart Kerr
- Antelope Valley College's new campus (1959), Lancaster
- New buildings for Allan Hancock College (1961), Santa Maria
- Buildings for South Hills High School (1963), West Covina

Other buildings he designed include (in California unless otherwise noted):

- Grand Central Air Terminal (1928), Glendale, NRHP-listed

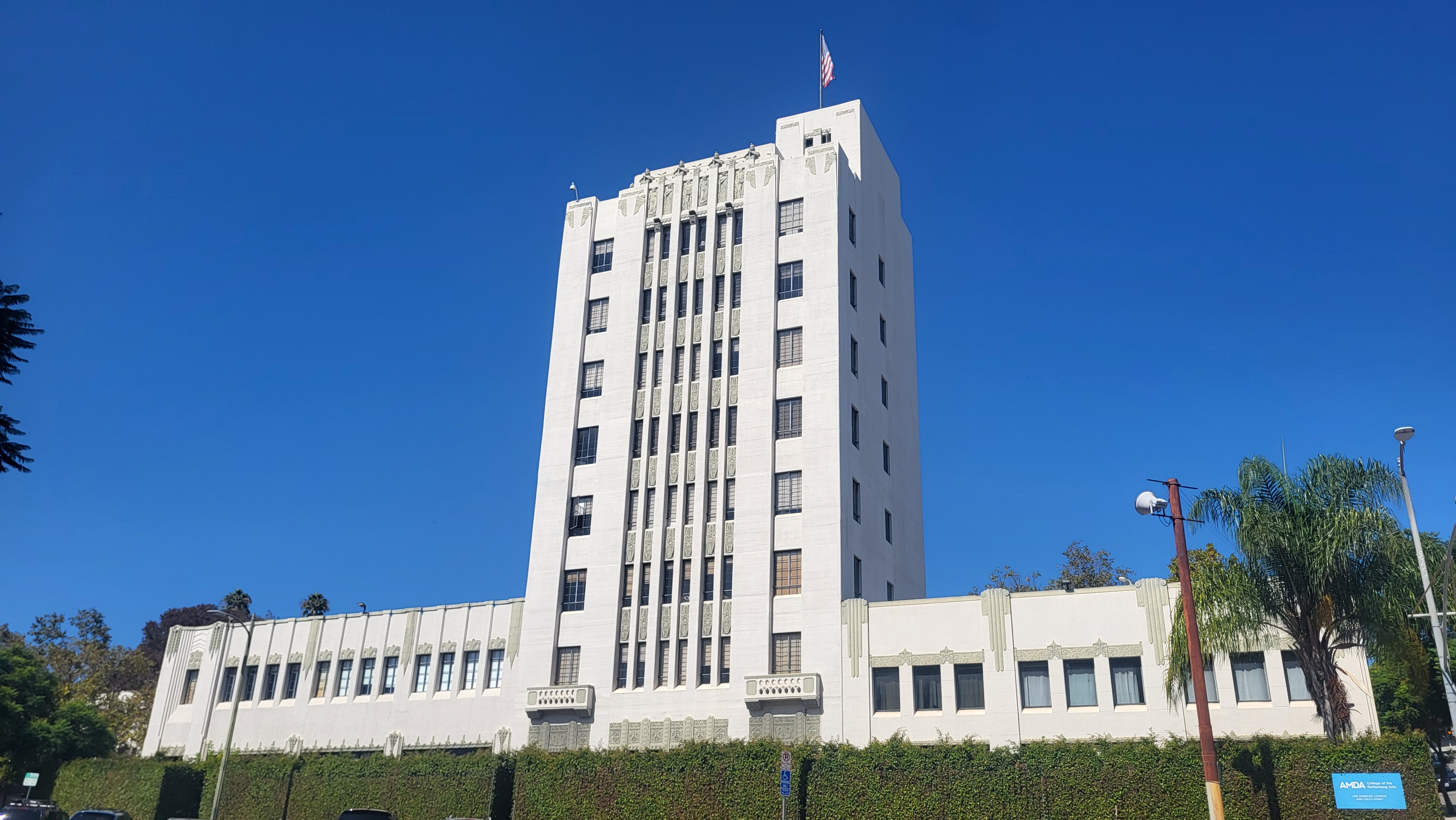
Yucca Vine Tower

- Yucca Vine Tower (1929), Los Angeles, LAHCM No. 1302
- Union Pacific Station, Las Vegas, Nevada (1929)
- Johnny's Steak House Building (1930), Los Angeles, NRHP-listed
- Gogerty Building (1930), Los Angeles
- Los Angeles Public Library Compton branch (1936)
- Hughes Aircraft Company factory (1941-1942), Culver City, CRHR-listed
- United States Navy Naval Ordnance Test Station (1942-1943), Inyokern
- Hughes Aircraft Company factory (1957-1958), Fullerton
- Van de Kamp's Holland Dutch Bakery and Yucca and Ivar
- Storefronts at 6357-67 Yucca Street

He also designed the Biltmore Hotel's bedrooms in Palm Springs, California, while the building itself was designed by Frederick Monhoff (1897–1975), and he designed and operated the Desert Air Hotel and Palm Desert Airpark in Rancho Mirage, California until 1968.

He sat on the Board of Trustees of the St. Anne's Foundation and was the recipient of the Angel Award in 1988.

=== Personal life ===
He married in 1922 and divorced in 1930. He died on January 4, 1990, in Los Angeles County, California.
