= Carl Jules Weyl =

German art director

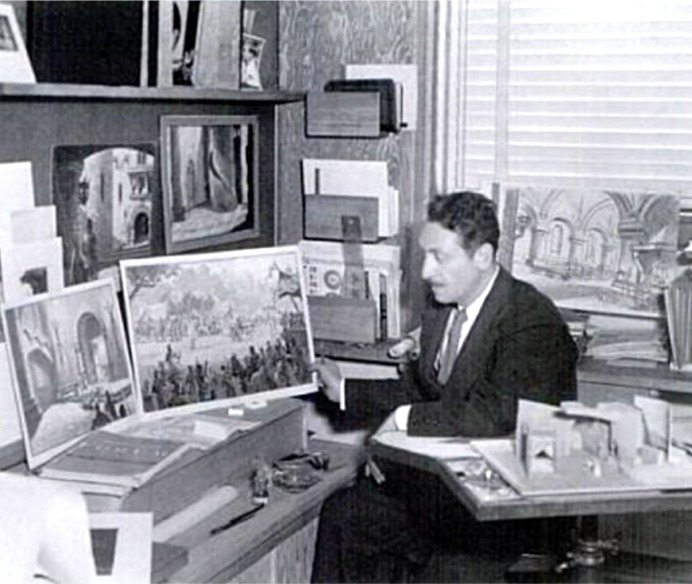
- Born: 6 December 1890; Stuttgart, Germany
- Died: 12 July 1948 (aged 57); Los Angeles, California, US
- Other name: Karl Felix Julius Weyl
- Occupations: Architect; Art director
- Years active: 1926–1929 (architect); 1930–1947 (art director)
- Spouse: Irma Lois Chase (divorced)

Carl Jules Weyl (6 December 1890 – 12 July 1948) was a German architect and art director. He designed or co-designed six contributing properties in the Hollywood Boulevard Commercial and Entertainment District, won a Best Art Direction Oscar for The Adventures of Robin Hood, and was nominated in the same category for Mission to Moscow.

== Early life and education ==
Weyl was born in Stuttgart, Germany. His father, Karl Friedrich Weyl, was an architect and field engineer of the Gotthard Rail Tunnel through the Alps. Carl Jules Weyl studied at the École des Beaux-Arts in Paris after architectural training in Berlin, Strasbourg, and Munich. He served as a first lieutenant of infantry in the German Reichswehr, according to his World War I draft registration card.

Weyl immigrated to the US on 31 March 1912, according to his 1933 petition for citizenship, on the SS Königin Luise (1896).

== Architect and art director ==
Weyl worked as an architect in California, first for John W. Reid Jr. in San Francisco, then in Los Angeles after he moved there in 1923.

When the Great Depression hit and building commissions dried up, Weyl joined Cecil B. DeMille Productions as an art director, then he joined Warner Brothers in the same position. Weyl initially worked as an assistant to Anton Grot and Robert M. Haas. His first set for Warner Bros was the fountain in Footlight Parade.

=== Buildings ===
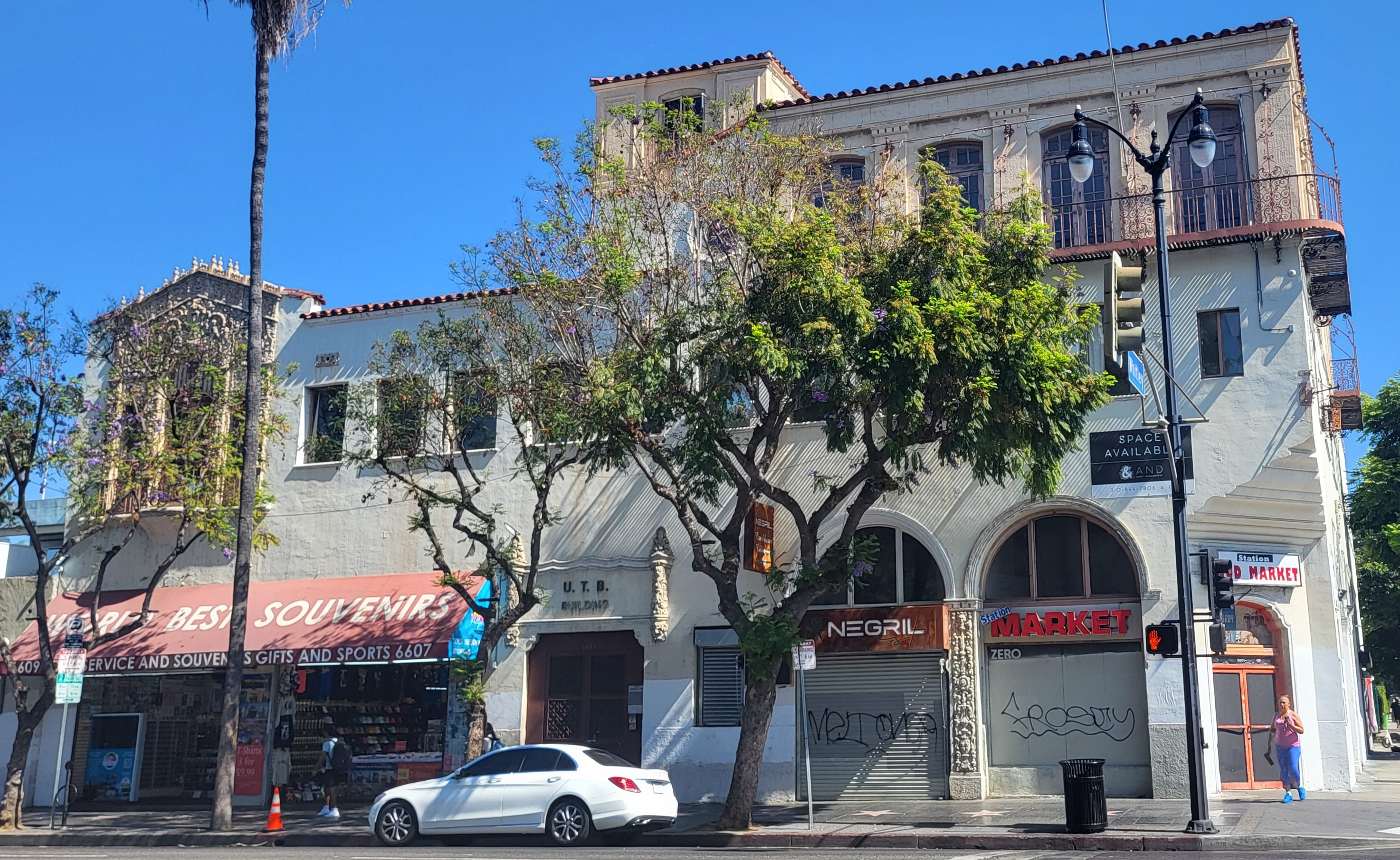
Baine Building

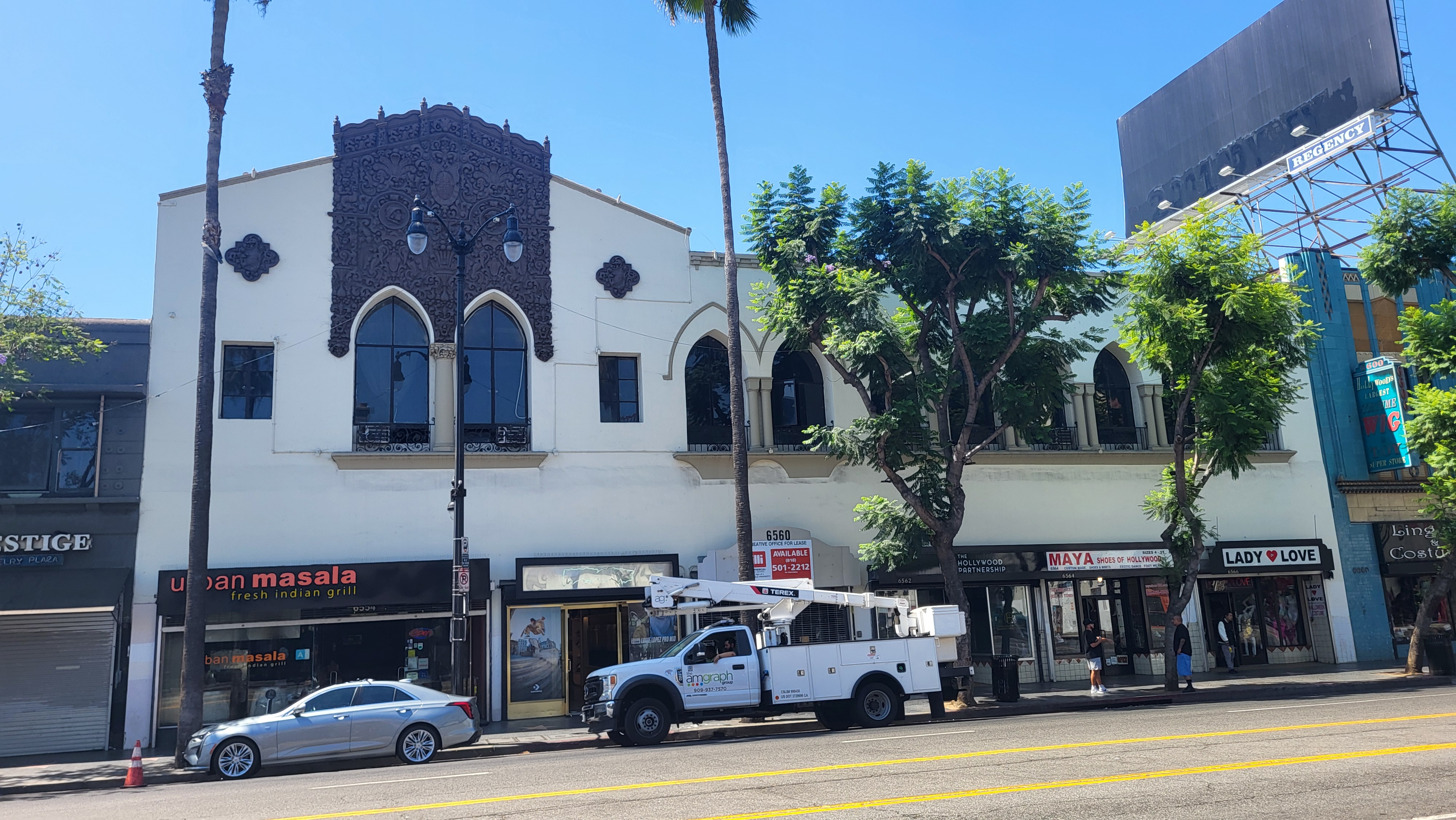
Hollywood Studio Building

Together with Henry L. Gogerty (1894-1990), he designed numerous buildings in Hollywood, California, including:

- Palace Theater (1926), NRHP-listed
- Baine Building (1926), NRHP-listed
- Hollywood Studio Building (1927), NRHP-listed
- 6356 Sunset Blvd. (1927)
- 6600 Sunset Blvd. (1928)
- Fred C. Thomson Building (1928), LAHCM No. 1196

Other buildings in Los Angeles designed by Weyl include:

- Hollywood Brown Derby (1928), NRHP-listed
- Herman Building (1928), NRHP-listed
- Christie Realty Building (1928), NRHP-listed
- York Boulevard State Bank

=== Selected filmography ===
- The Florentine Dagger (1935)
- Bullets or Ballots (1936)
- Kid Galahad (1937)
- The Adventures of Robin Hood (1938)
- Confessions of a Nazi Spy (1939)
- The Letter (1940)
- The Great Lie (1941)
- Kings Row (1942)
- Yankee Doodle Dandy (1942)
- Casablanca (1942)
- Mission to Moscow (1943)
- Passage to Marseille (1944)
- The Corn Is Green (1945)
- The Big Sleep (1946)
- Escape Me Never (1947)

== Personal life ==
Weyl was best man at the Beverly Hills wedding of film comedian Harry Langdon in 1929.
