= Paul de Longpré Residence =

Former home in Los Angeles, California, U.S.

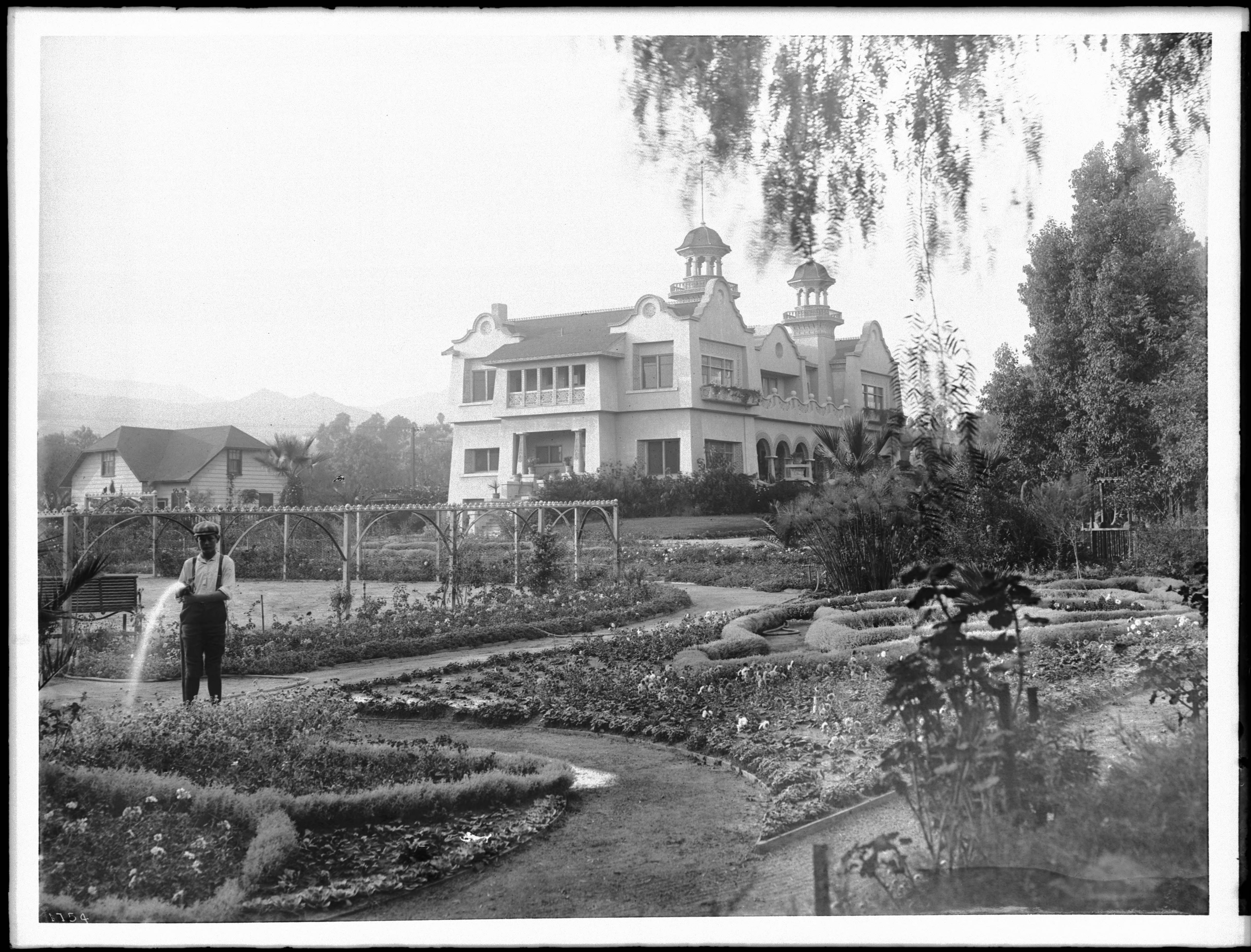
- Paul deLongpre residence, 1902 or 1903
- Interactive map of the Paul de Longpré Residence area

General information
- Architectural style: Mission Revival, Moorish
- Location: Northwest corner of Prospect Avenue and Cahuenga Boulevard
- Coordinates: 34.1019°N 118.3296°W
- Demolished: 1927
- Owner: Paul de Longpré

Technical details
- Floor count: 2

Design and construction
- Architect: Louis Bourgeois

Paul de Longpré Residence was a 3-acre (1.2 ha) estate located on the northwest corner of Prospect Avenue and Cahuenga Boulevard in what is now Hollywood, California. It is considered Hollywood's first tourist attraction, with the owner stating "the community is new, but time will change this art world and center it here."

== History ==
The Paul de Longpré Residence was built by Louis Bourgeois for Paul de Longpré in 1901, on three lots obtained from Daeida Wilcox Beveridge in exchange for three of de Longpré's paintings. The estate, which featured an elaborate two-story Mission Revival/Moorish mansion, de Longpré's personal art collection, and flower gardens that at their peak contained more than 4000 roses in 800 varieties, drew not only Hollywood society, but also property buyers and tourists. So many visitors came (8000 per month at the estate's height in popularity) that the Pacific Electric Railway added a trolley spur on Ivar Avenue to deposit riders closer to the estate, and Los Angeles Pacific Railway included it on their Balloon Route as well.

Tours of the estate and print sales of de Longpré's floral paintings supported de Longpré and his family until his death in 1911. After his death, his family returned to France, and the estate was demolished in 1927 to make way for Warner Brothers Hollywood Theater.

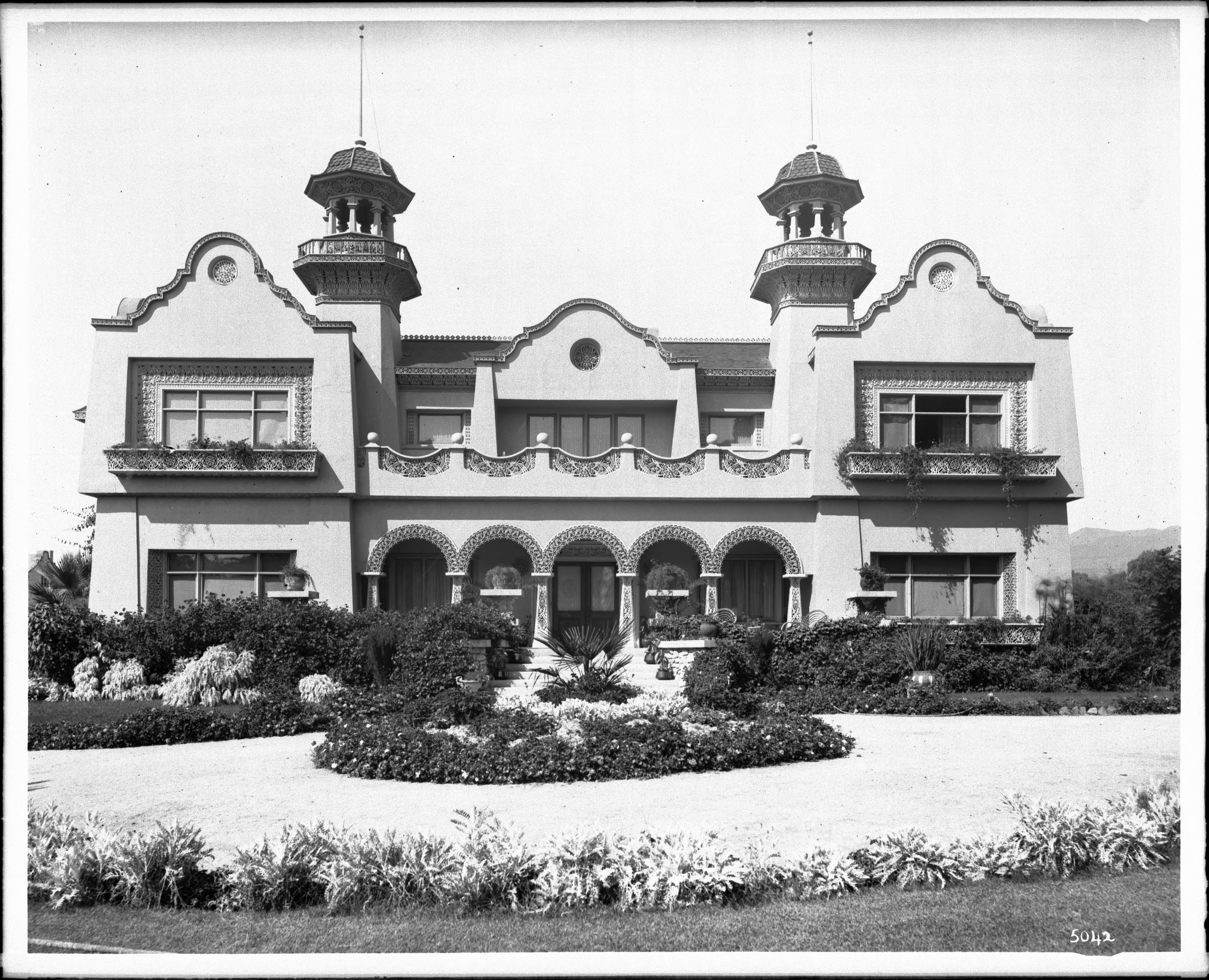
The mansion, 1905

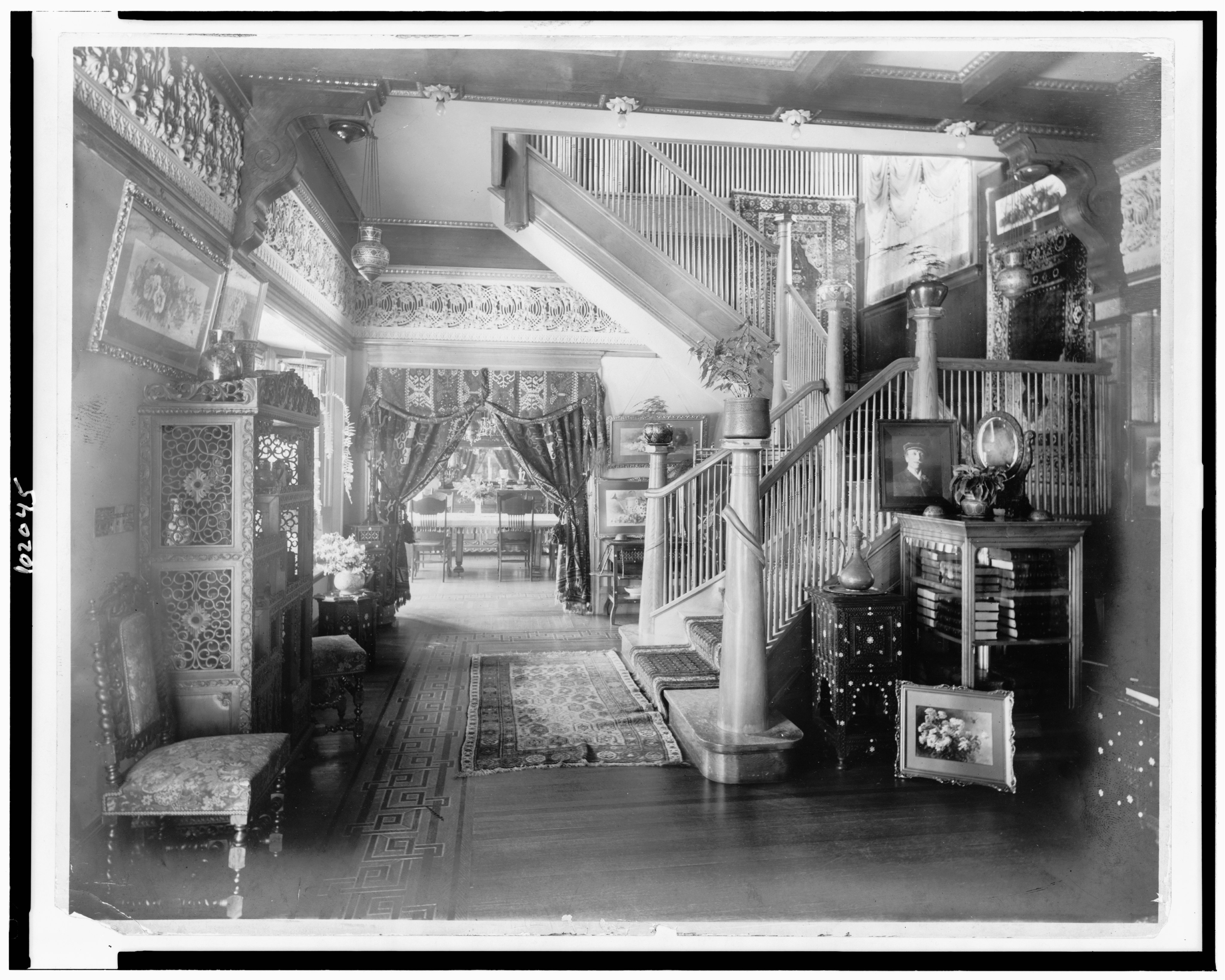
Reception hall, 1905

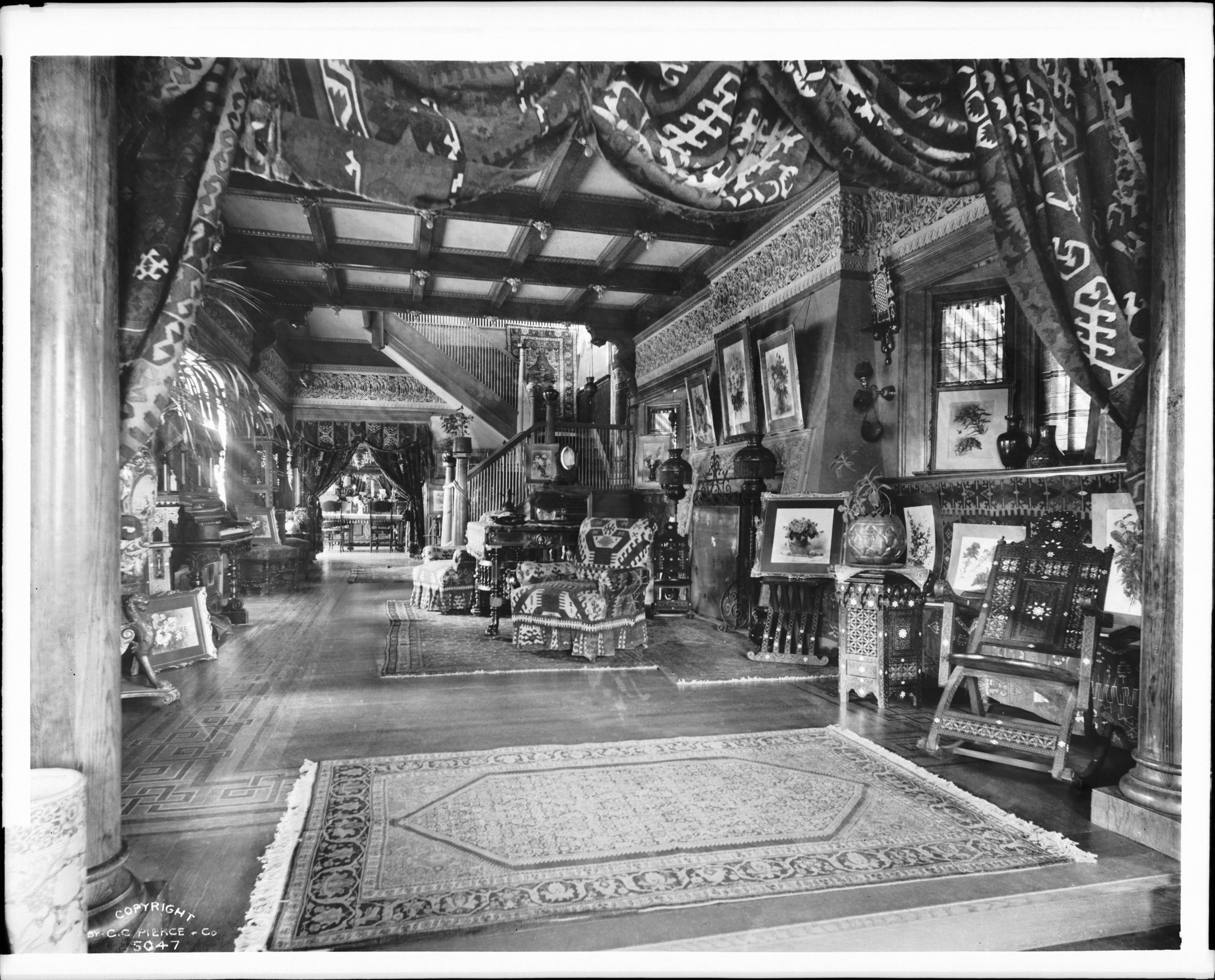
Entrance hall, 1905

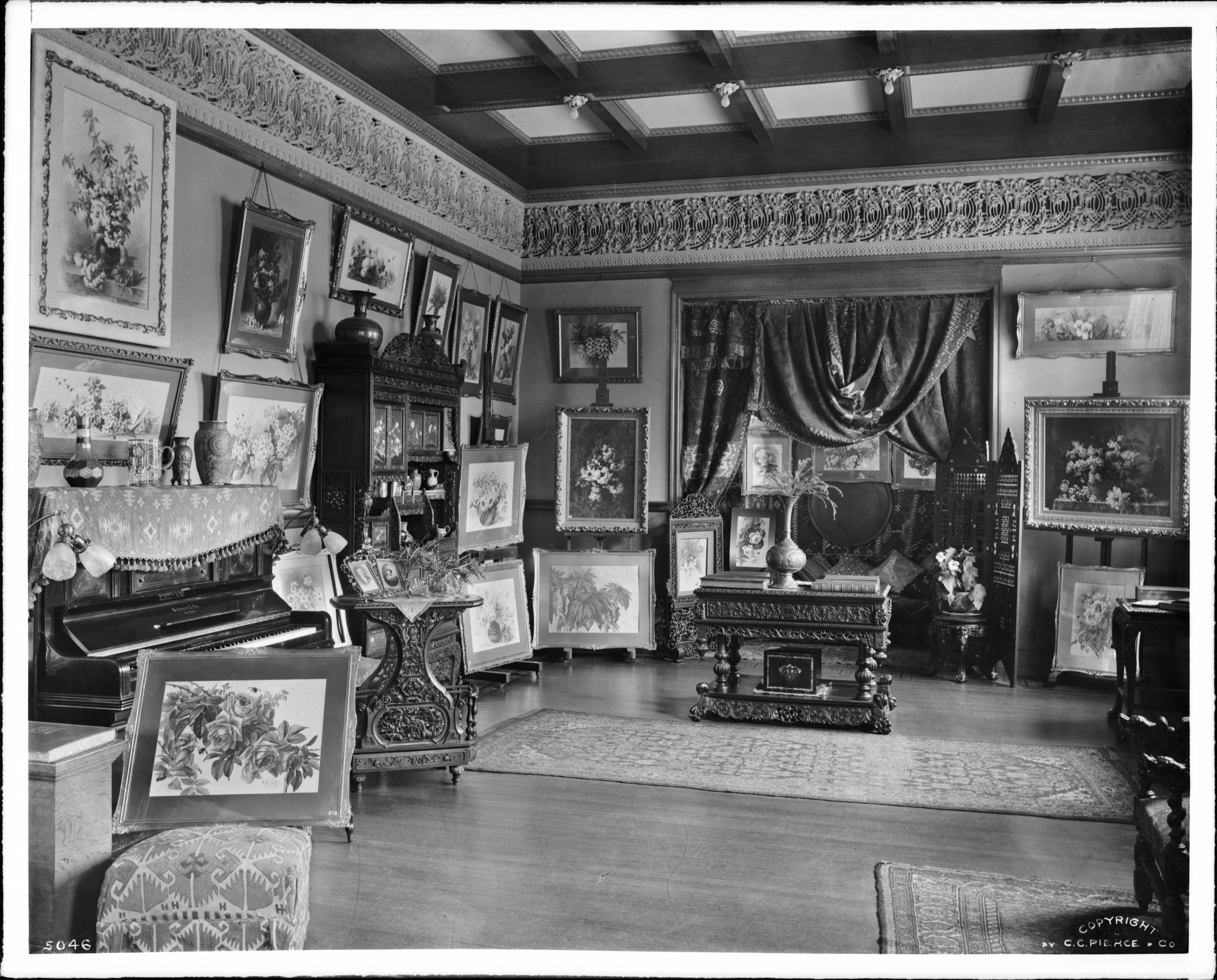
Art studio, 1905

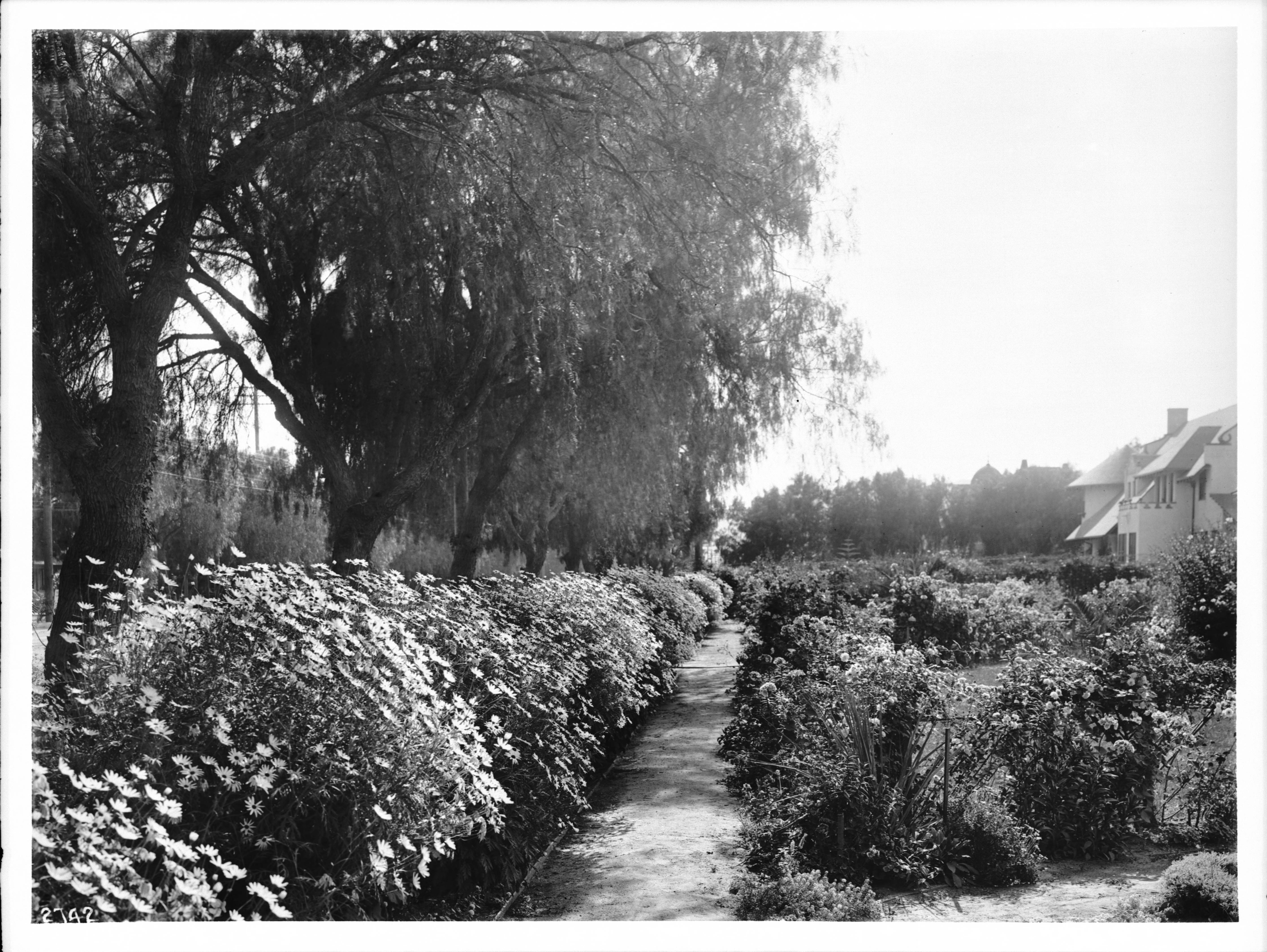
Gardens, 1890s

== In popular culture ==
Mary Pickford's Love Among the Roses was filmed in the de Longpré residence gardens. A booklet was also written about the estate, and its first printing was 200,000 copies.
