= Warner Cinerama =

Warner Cinerama, Warner Cinerama Theater, or Warner Cinerama Theatre may refer to:

- Strand Theatre (Manhattan), formerly Warner Cinerama Theatre
- Hollywood Pacific Theatre, formerly Warner Cinerama Theatre
