= Paul de Longpré =

French painter (1855–1911)

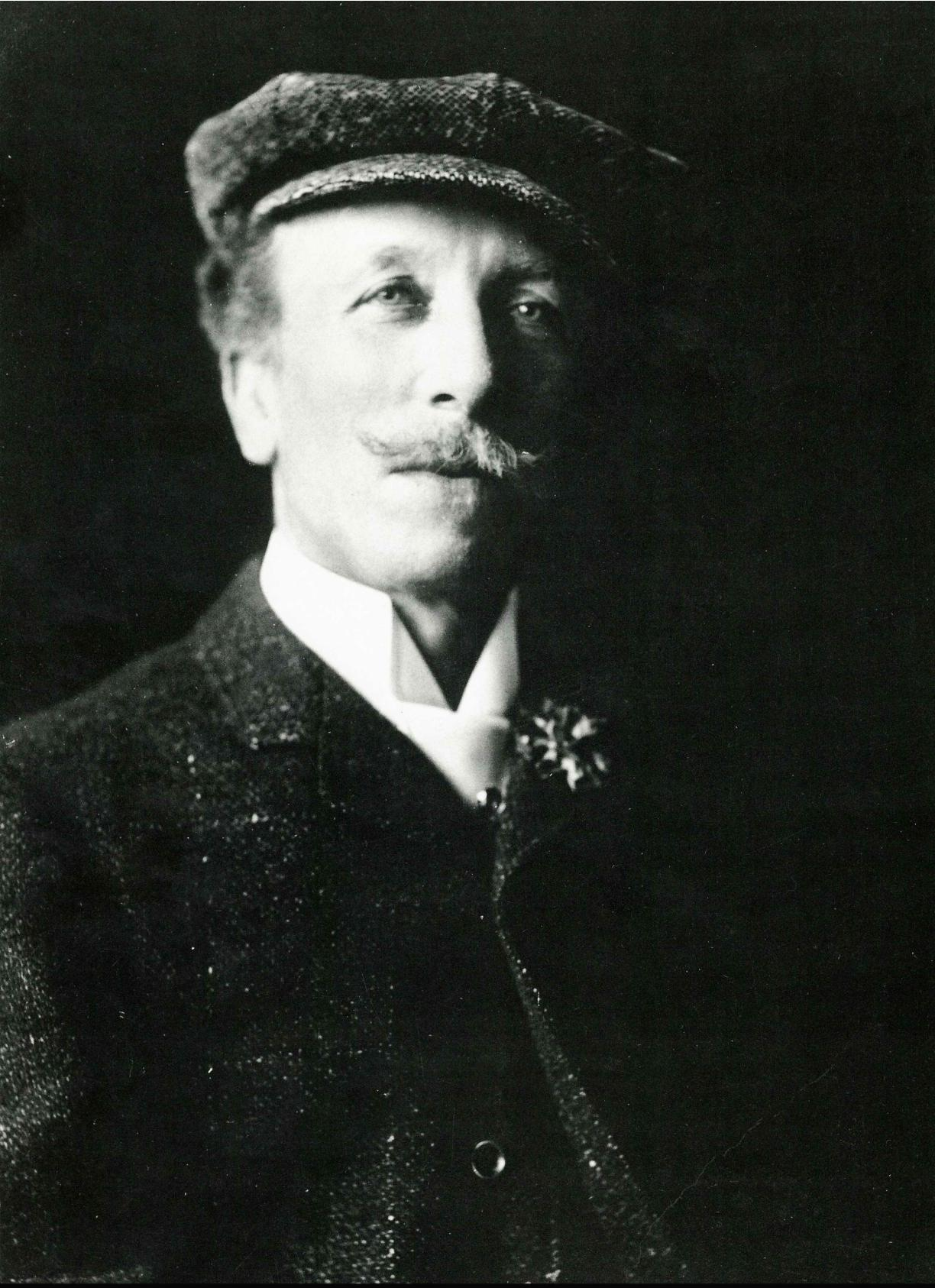
- Portrait circa 1909
- Born: Paul-Gaston-Raoul-Henry-Georges Maucherat de Longpré; 1855; Lyon, France
- Died: June 29, 1911 (aged 55–56); Los Angeles, California, United States
- Known for: Paintings of flowers
- Notable work: Double Peach Blossoms (1902); White Fringed Poppies (1902)
- Movement: Realism
- Spouse: Josephine de Longpré

Paul de Longpré (April18, 1855 - June 29, 1911) was a French-born American painter who specialized in floral still life's and botanical watercolors. Renowned in his era as "Le Roi des Fleurs" (The King of Flowers), de Longpré gained widespread fame for his delicate, realistic portrayals of living flowers, often depicted alongside insects (Bumblebees), dramatic light, and intricate accessories like woven baskets or cut-glass vases. After establishing a career in Paris and New York, he relocated to Southern California in 1899, where his Moorish estate and three-acre garden in Hollywood became the town's first major tourist destination.

== Biography ==
=== Early Life and Family (1855 - 1874) ===
Paul de Longpré was born at six o'clock in the morning on April 18, 1855, in Villeurbanne, a suburb of Lyon, France. He belonged to a family with deep artistic and literary roots.

- Clément-François Maucherat de Longpré (Paternal Grandfather): A writer and librarian in Lyon who was arrested around 1815 after authoring controversial political pamphlets.
- Jean-Antoine-Marie-Victor Maucherat de Longpré (Father, b. March 16, 1811): A draftsman who designed floral patterns for Lyon's famous silk looms, with 147 of his original drawings preserved in the Musée des Tissus.
- Marie-Thérèse Pinchaud (Mother): A French Creole heiress whose dowry was later squandered by her husband.
- Raoul-Henry-Victor-Maurice Maucherat de Longpré (Younger Brother): Achieved acclaim as a painter of floral still lifes.

When Paul was eight years old, his family moved to Paris. Due to financial hardships, young Paul received only about 15 months of formal schooling before entering the workforce at age ten, working up to sixteen hours a day assisting his father and brothers at the silk looms.

Despite his lack of formal academic schooling, de Longpré was a natural artist and largely self-taught. He began to sketch and paint as early as age ten or twelve. As a schoolboy, he knew his classmates had wealthy parents, so earned money selling them sketches of little flowers nestled in meadow grass. By age twelve, he was painting field flowers, songbirds, and daisies on silk and ivory fans in Paris with his brothers, earning between $20 and $30 per day. By his late teens, he had earned a strong reputation as an industrial textile designer and received personal guidance from French academic master Jean-Léon Gérôme and Léon Bonnat.

=== Marriage and Career in France (1874 - 1890) ===
==== Family Life and Seasonal Workflow ====
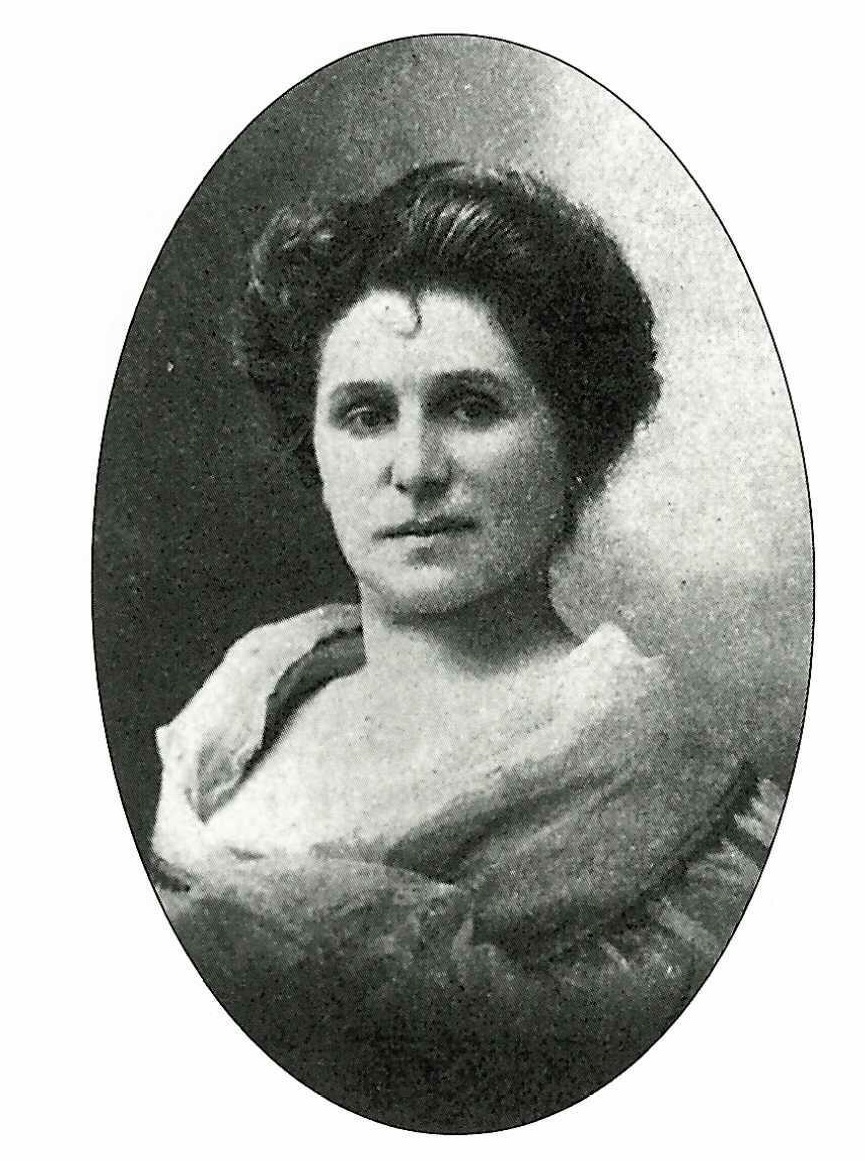
Joséphine (Estiévenard) de Longpré

In March 1874, at age nineteen, de Longpré married Joséphine Estiévenard, an accomplished Parisian seamstress. While residing in Paris, the couple raised two daughters: Alice, and Blanche.To achieve absolute fidelity to nature in his artistic practice, de Longpré established a strict dual seasonal workflow. He spent six months of each year at a country cottage outside Paris, painting en plein air for up to twelve hours daily to capture living blossoms in natural sunlight. During the winter months, he returned to his Paris studio to execute high-end commercial fan decoration on silk and ivory, supplying prominent luxury boutiques across the city.

==== Conservatory Partnership and Botanical Illustration ====
During the 1880s, de Longpré formed a pivotal working partnership with French horticulturist M. Paillet, who granted him exclusive access to his extensive private conservatory in Châtenay, a suburb of Paris. This access enabled de Longpré to conduct detailed scientific botanical studies of rare exotic plants under glass, reinforcing his strict personal rule never to paint artificial flowers or wilting studio arrangements. His growing reputation for botanical precision earned him a long-running tenure as an illustrator for the French periodical Revue Horticole from 1880 to 1901, culminating in the entire 1891 volume being illustrated exclusively by de Longpré.

==== Exhibition History and Recognition ====
De Longpré made his formal public debut at the Paris Salon in 1877 at the age of twenty-two with his painting Fleurs des champs (Wildflowers or Field flowers). He continued to showcase major floral compositions in Paris, including two additional showing at the Paris Salon in 1879 Pivoines et lilas (Peonies and lilacs) and in 1880 Marguerites (Daises), Roses, and Pivoines (Peonies) at the Paris Independents exhibition in 1884. The peak of his official career recognition in France arrived in 1889, when his oil painting Summer Flowers was awarded a Silver Medal at the Exposition Universelle in Paris.

== Relocation to New York ==
Despite his success, de Longpré suffered severe financial devastation in the late 1880's. Unfortunately, some of his earnings were poorly invested in Panama Canal securities, supporting the failed efforts of Ferdinand de Lesseps. The collapse of the Comptoir d'Escompte de Paris bank in 1889 erased de Longpré's lifesavings. Left with only $900 and his personal artwork, de Longpré accepted a commercial decorative commission in New York and departed France on October 17, 1890, carrying letters of reference from Gérôme and Bonnat.

== Life in Hollywood ==
De Longpré arrived in Los Angeles, Southern California with his family in 1899. Daeida Wilcox, with husband H. H. Wilcox the founders of Hollywood, was so eager to attract culture to the town that she gave him her homesite for his estate, three lots on Cahuenga on the north of Prospect (later Hollywood Boulevard), in exchange for three of his paintings.

In 1901, Canadian architect Louis Bourgeois designed a landmark residence for the 3-acre (1.2 ha) estate, in the Mission Revival style. The house included an art gallery to sell prints of de Longpré's paintings, and was surrounded by the expansive "Le Roi de Fleur" flower gardens. Estate tours became a popular tourist destination off an exclusive Balloon Route trolley spur of the Los Angeles Pacific Railroad, that later became a Pacific Electric Redcar line, and with print sales additional sources of income for de Longpré.

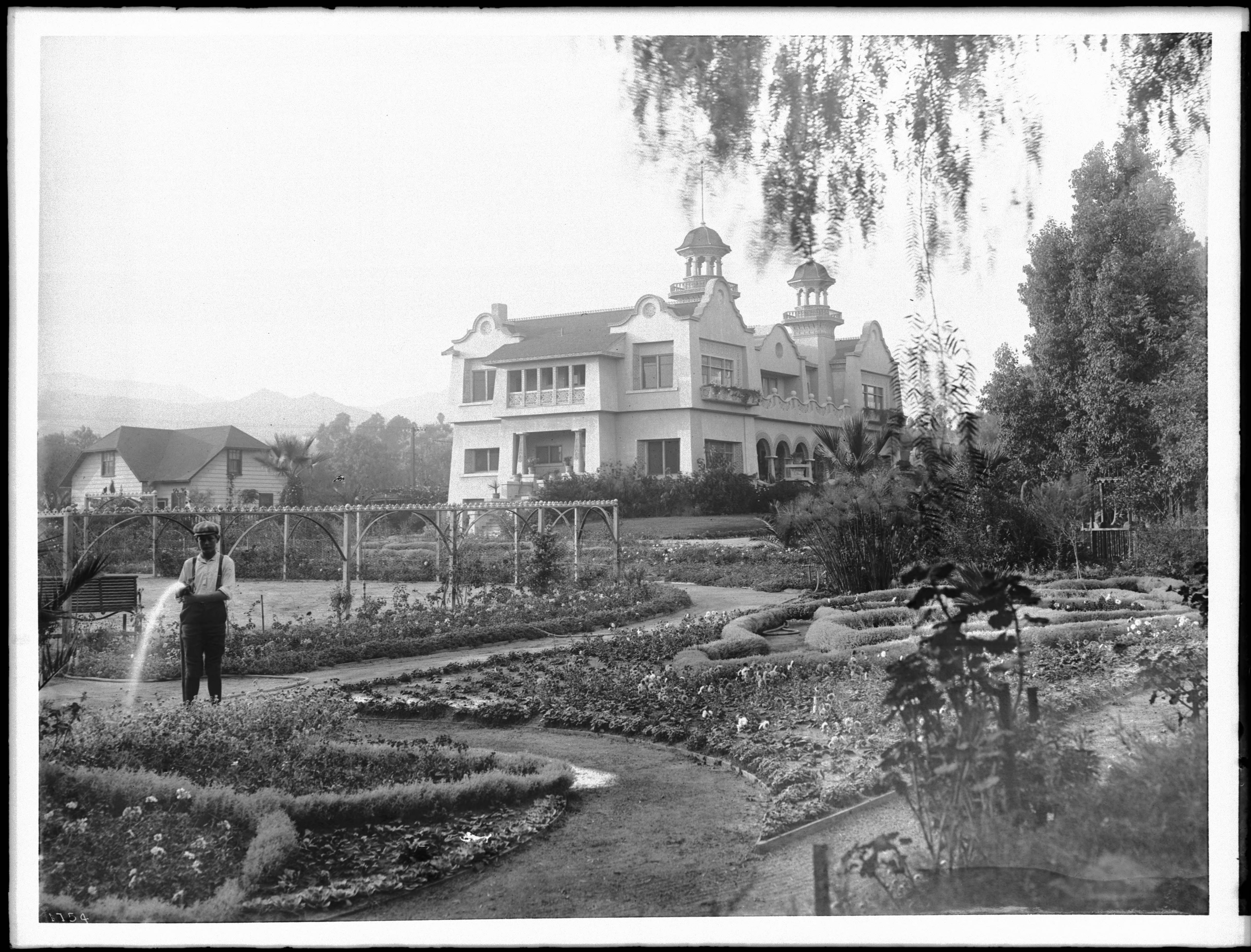
Paul de Longpré house and garden, formerly located at Hollywood Boulevard and Cahuenga Boulevard, in Hollywood, California.

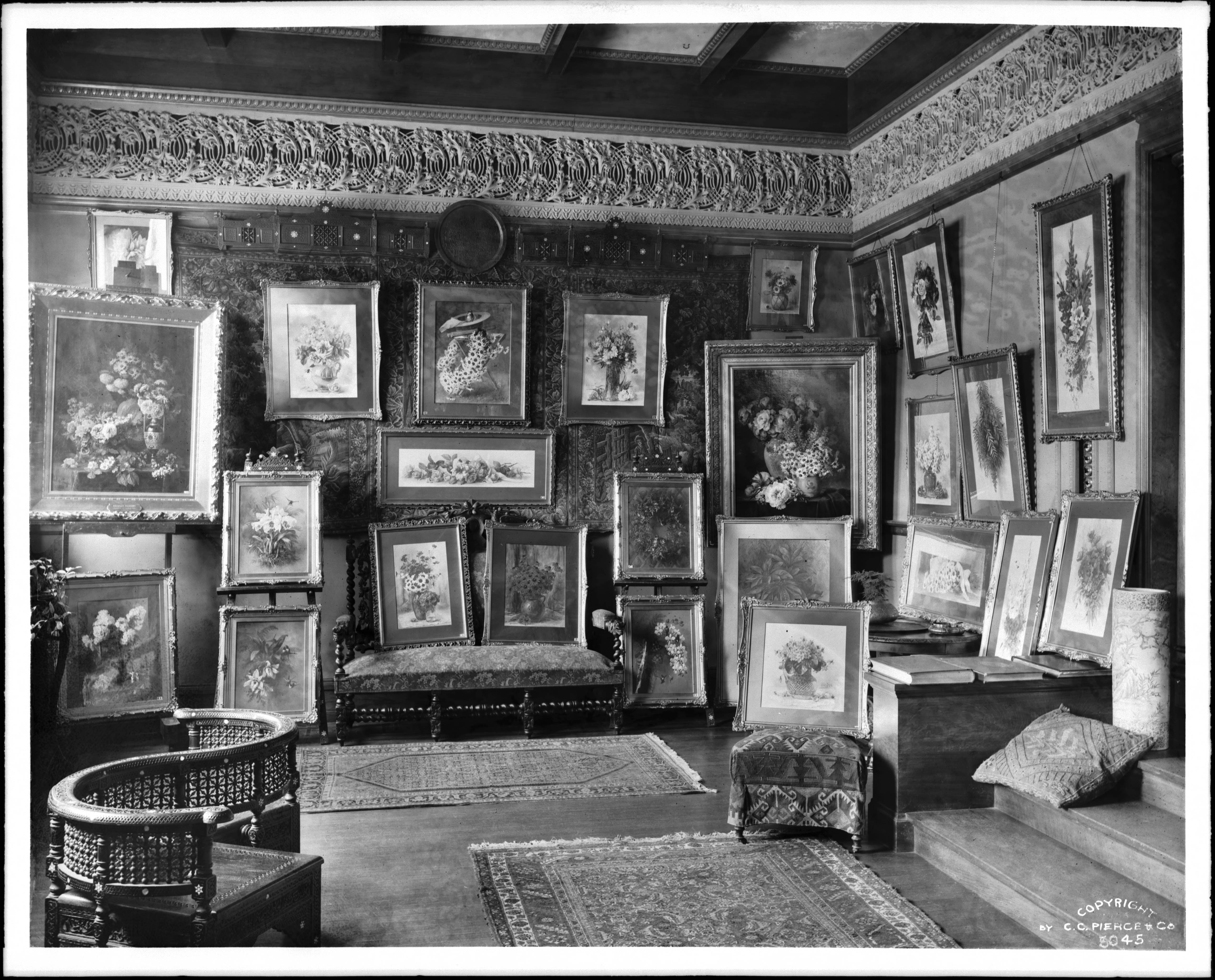
Paul de Longpré art gallery, Hollywood.

Paul de Longpré is listed in the 1900 US Census, Los Angeles City Ward 5, Precincts 38 B and 73 A, with his wife Josephine and daughters Blance, Alice, and Pauline. His occupation is listed as Artist, but the last name is misspelled as De Lonpre, It indicates Paul, Josephine, Blance, and Alice were born in France, and Pauline was born in New York City. The architect Louis Bourgeois also taught French to de Longpré's daughters, and later married his daughter Alice.

Paul de Longpré died at home in Los Angeles at age 56, on 29 June 1911.

Afterwards, the family moved back to France. The increased property values in rapidly developing Hollywood resulted in demolition of the gardens by 1924, and the house in 1927.

== Works ==
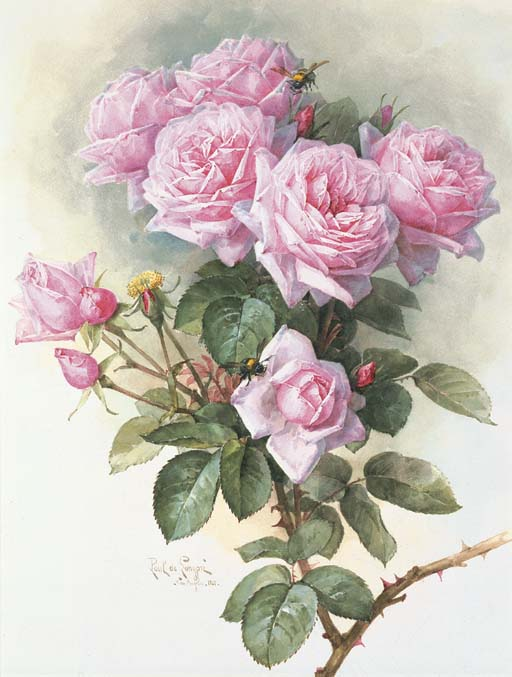
Roses and Bumblebees, 1899

De Longpré only painted specimens of flowers. With a delicacy of touch and feeling for color he united scientific knowledge and art. He also knew how to give expression to the subtle essence of the flowers. Painting floral scenes almost exclusively in watercolors, in the 1900s de Longpre found inspiration in the 4,000 rose bushes he planted on his Hollywood estate. The finest of his paintings include Double Peach Blossoms and White Fringed Poppies (1902) – both widely known through popular reproductions.

== Legacy ==
Hollywood's De Longpre Avenue and De Longpre Park are both named after Paul de Longpré.
