= Nettie Tobin =

Illinois Baháʼí Community member

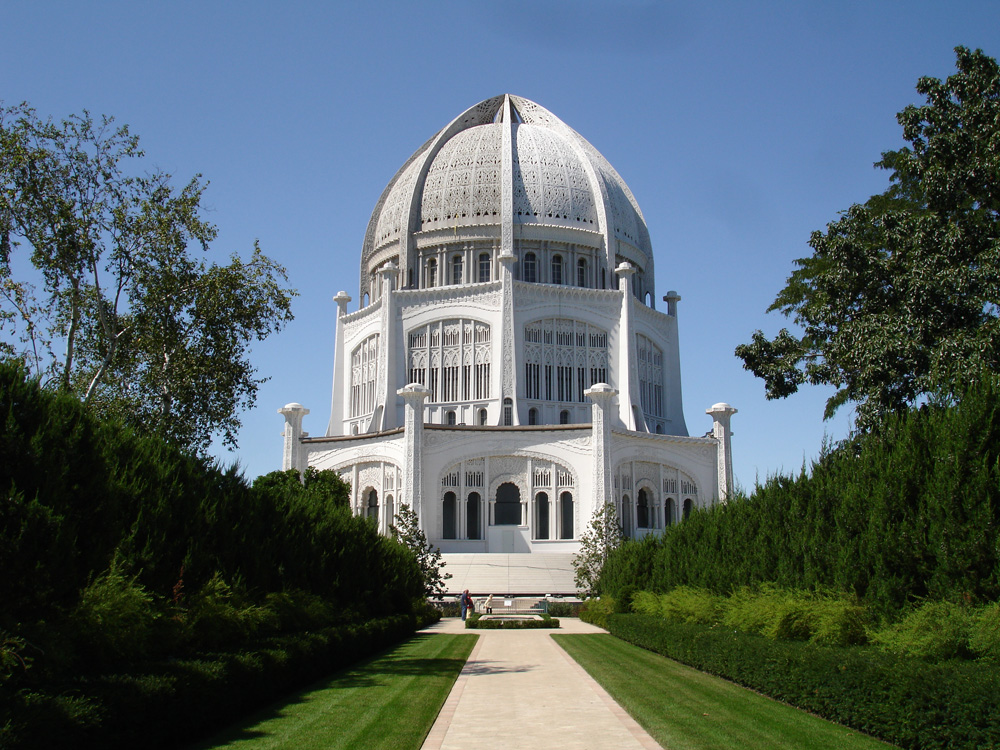
Baháʼí House of Worship, Wilmette, Illinois.

Esther "Nettie" Tobin (1863–1944) was a seamstress in Chicago around the turn of the 20th century who became a member of the Baháʼí Community there. Tobin, who wished to contribute to the "Baháʼí Temple Unity", a precursor for the National Spiritual Assembly of the Baháʼís of the United States, for the construction of the future Baháʼí House of Worship in Wilmette, Illinois was not able to contribute monetarily. Inspired by a letter that suggested even a "stone" to be a value, she went to a construction site nearby her home in Chicago and asked for a stone from the reject pile. With the help of friends and neighbors she was able to move the stone via streetcar and wagon to Wilmette, where it was left on the Baháʼí property. Although other stones had been sent for the dedication ceremony in 1912, none of them had arrived. On May 1, 1912,ʻAbdu'l-Bahá directed that "Nettie's stone" used as the dedication stone of the future Baháʼí House of Worship. The "cornerstone" was not used in the construction of the building, but instead is displayed in the visitor center, where it remains today.

Tobin died on March 31, 1944 after a four-year illness. She had at least two children.

== See also ==
- ʻAbdu'l-Bahá's journeys to the West
