= Louis Bourgeois (architect) =

Canadian architect

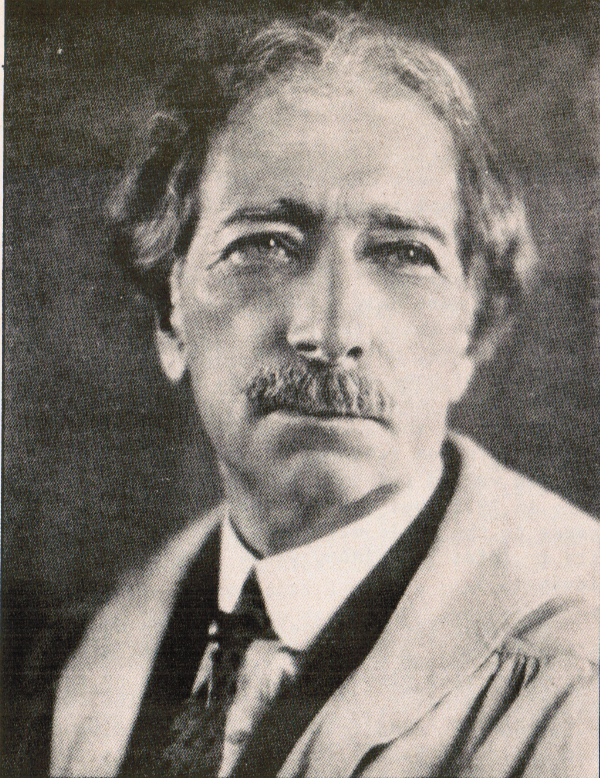
- Born: March 19, 1856; Saint-Célestin, Canada East
- Died: August 20, 1930 (aged 74); Wilmette, Illinois, U.S.
- Occupation: Architect

Jean-Baptiste Louis Bourgeois (March 19, 1856 – August 20, 1930) was a Canadian architect, active in Canada and the United States. He is perhaps best known for designing the Baháʼí House of Worship in Wilmette, Illinois.

== History ==
In his youth, Louis Bourgeois worked as a clerk in a church contractor's office in Trois-Rivières, Quebec. The medical bills of his wife, Marie Gronville, caused him to go into debt, and thus he moved to Montreal to work as an apprentice sculptor to Napoléon Bourassa. Bourassa sent Bourgeois to Paris to study sculpture with his cousin Louis Philippe Hebert. Bourgeois left his studies and travelled to other countries including Italy, Greece, Egypt, and Persia.

He returned to North America in 1896, to Chicago where he worked with innovative architect Louis Sullivan. Within several years he moved to Southern California, where he designed the Paul de Longpré Residence in the Mission Revival style, in central Hollywood for the popular still-life painter Paul de Longpré. The 1898 house at Hollywood Boulevard and Cahuenga, with an art gallery to sell de Longpré paintings and surrounded by the expansive "Le Roi de Fleur" gardens, became a tourist destination on a P.E. Redcars line. Bourgeois also taught French to de Longpré's daughters, and married one of them, Alice.

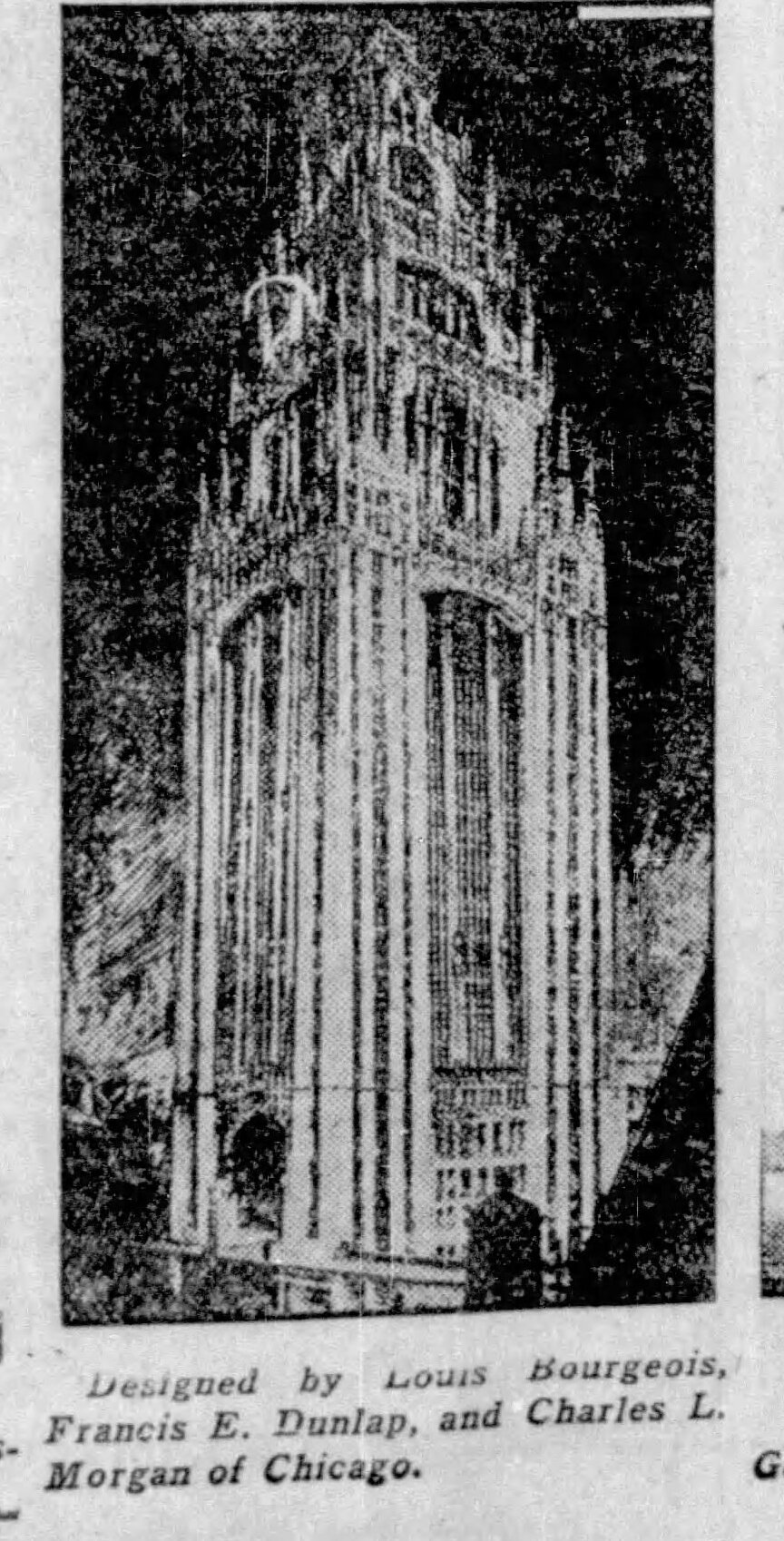
Bourgeouis, Dunlap, and Morgan's submission for the Tribune Tower design competition

Bourgeois jointly created a design with Francis E. Dunlap and Charles L. Morgan for the 1922 Tribune Tower design competition. Their design was named an "honorable mention".

=== Baháʼí ===
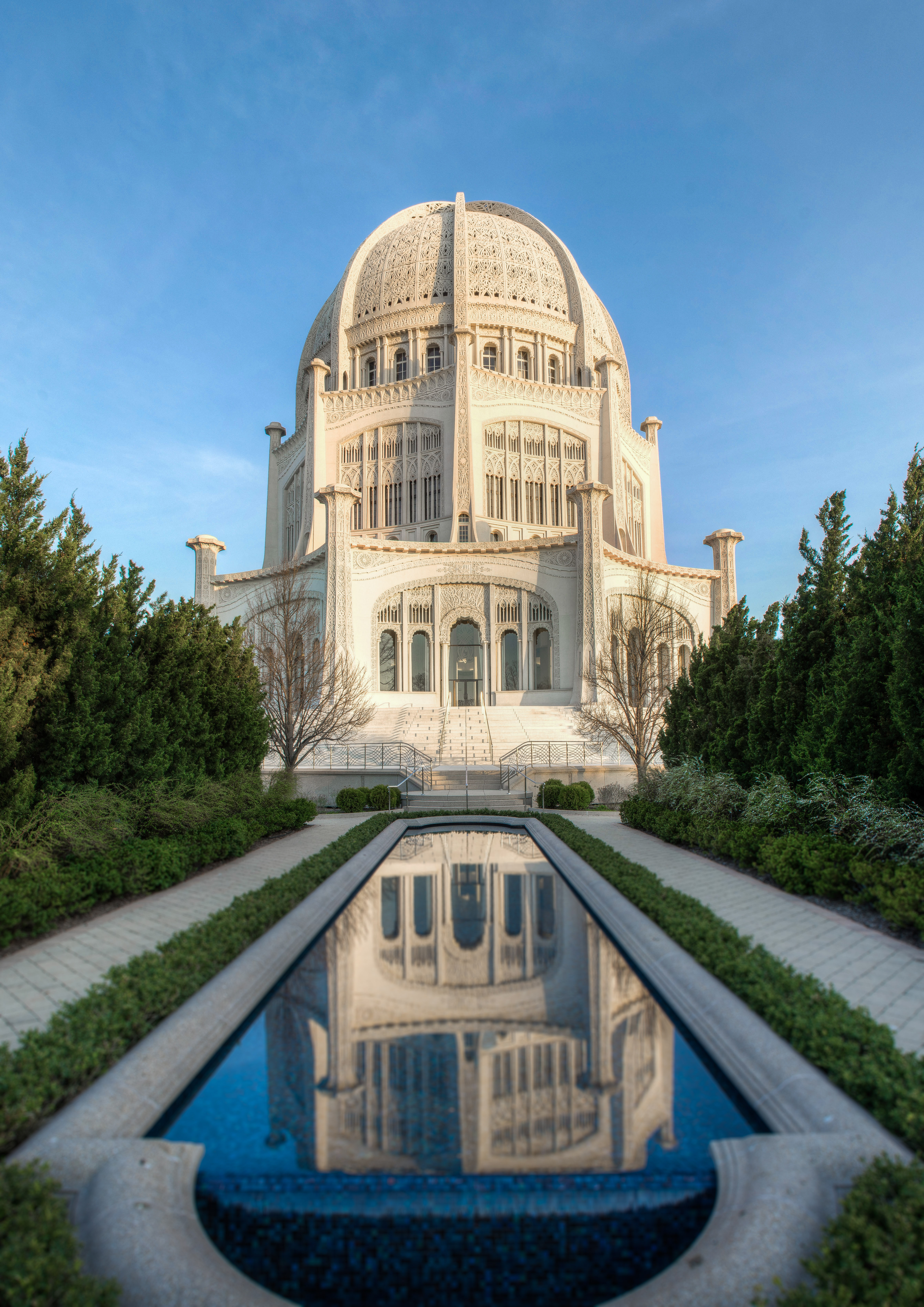
Baháʼí House of Worship, Wilmette, United States

By the winter of 1906, Bourgeois and his wife had joined the Baháʼí faith after having "come into association with the Baha'i Faith through Marie Watson and Mary Hanford Ford" (then of Boston's Baháʼí community.) The Baháʼí teaching on the unity of religions was also important to him. When he was in New York City, Bourgeois joined the community there but then soon moved to Teaneck, New Jersey, to expand the Baháʼí community there.

Wilmette Baháʼí House of Worship

Louis Bourgeois may be best known as the architect of the Baháʼí House of Worship in Wilmette, suburban Cook County, Illinois. To give ʻAbdu'l-Baha an idea of the design direction he would take, he sent a plan that he had previously submitted for the eight-sided Peace Palace and Library in The Hague. In 1920 his design, revised with nine sides, was chosen for the Wilmette Baháʼí House of Worship by the delegates to the Baháʼí national convention.

Construction began in 1921. The Foundation Hall was completed in 1922, and used as a meeting place. During the 1920s he spent much time making an architectural model and constructing the complex structure, and financing his efforts to do so, through periods of illness.

After a month of bad health, Louis Bourgeois died at the age of 74 on August 20, 1930.

The temple of the Wilmette Baháʼí House of Worship was finally completed and dedicated in 1953.

== See also ==
- Baháʼí House of Worship (Wilmette, Illinois)
