= Jacob Fabian =

American theater owner and executive (1865–1941)

- Born: February 25, 1865; Austrian Empire
- Died: April 24, 1941 (aged 76); New York City, U.S.
- Occupations: Entertainment executive; theater owner; film exhibitor
- Years active: 1914–1929
- Organizations: Associated First National Pictures Producers (vice president); First National Pictures (executive); Stanley Company of America (director; vice president)
- Spouse: Rose Glascheib
- Children: Two

Jacob Fabian (February 25, 1865 – April 24, 1941) was an American entertainment executive and theater owner based in New Jersey. He was a pioneer in the film industry and establishing large motion pictures theaters. He served as Vice President of Associated First National Pictures Producers, which became First National Pictures, Inc. in 1924. He was an original franchise holder of the organization and owned the New Jersey First National Exchange.

== Early life ==
Fabian was born in the Austrian Empire on February 25, 1865. He immigrated to the United States at the age of 17.

== Career ==
Fabian worked in the clothing business until 1914. That year, he entered the motion picture industry and built the Regent Theater in Paterson, New Jersey. He later expanded his operations, building additional theaters in Paterson and extending his chain to Newark, Elizabeth, Passaic, and other cities in Northern New Jersey.

He leased the Salaam Temple property in Newark to operate the Mosque Theater. The transaction was reported to be worth $1 million.

In March 1926, Fabian and his sons purchased stock in West Coast Theatres, Inc. By May 1926, his company merged with the Stanley Company, led by Jules E. Mastbaum. This merger formed the Stanley Company of America, a theater chain spanning from Massachusetts to Virginia. For marketing purposes, the Fabian chain was rebranded as Stanley-Fabian under the direction of the Stanley Company.

After Mastbaum died in December 1926, a merger between First National Pictures, the Stanley Company of America, and West Coast Theatres created a large theater holding company in the world. During this period, a block of theaters was sold to Warner Brothers Pictures.

In July 1928, the Stanley Company elected a new board of directors, which included Fabian and his son, Simon. By September 1928, the assets of Warner, Stanley, First National, and the Vitaphone Corporation were combined. These assets included the First National Studio, which later became Warner Bros. Studios Burbank in Burbank, California. This acquisition made Warner Brothers one of the largest production and distribution companies in Hollywood.

Fabian maintained a summer residence in Paterson, New Jersey, but lived primarily in Miami Beach, Florida, starting in 1929. By February of that year, he had resigned as Vice President of both the Stanley Company and First National Pictures. His son, Simon, took over his business interests and managed a chain of theaters, including locations in New York. Simon also served on the board of directors at Warner Brothers and as vice president and General Manager of the Stanley Company of America.

== Death and legacy ==
Fabian was married to Rose Glascheib, and they had three children, Abraham, Eleanor, and Simon. Fabian died on April 24, 1941, at Roosevelt Hospital in New York City. He was 76 years old.

In 1953, Warner Brothers divested its theater holdings following the Paramount antitrust decrees. The theaters were spun off into a new company, the Stanley Warner Corporation, led by Simon H. Fabian. Fabian Enterprises purchased the 24 percent stock interest of Jack, Harry, and Albert Warner. Simon Fabian operated the chain with his son Edward Fabian, brother-in-law Samuel Rosen, and Louis R. Golding.
