= Baháʼí House of Worship (Wilmette, Illinois) =

Baháʼí temple in Wilmette, Illinois, United States

- U.S. National Register of Historic Places
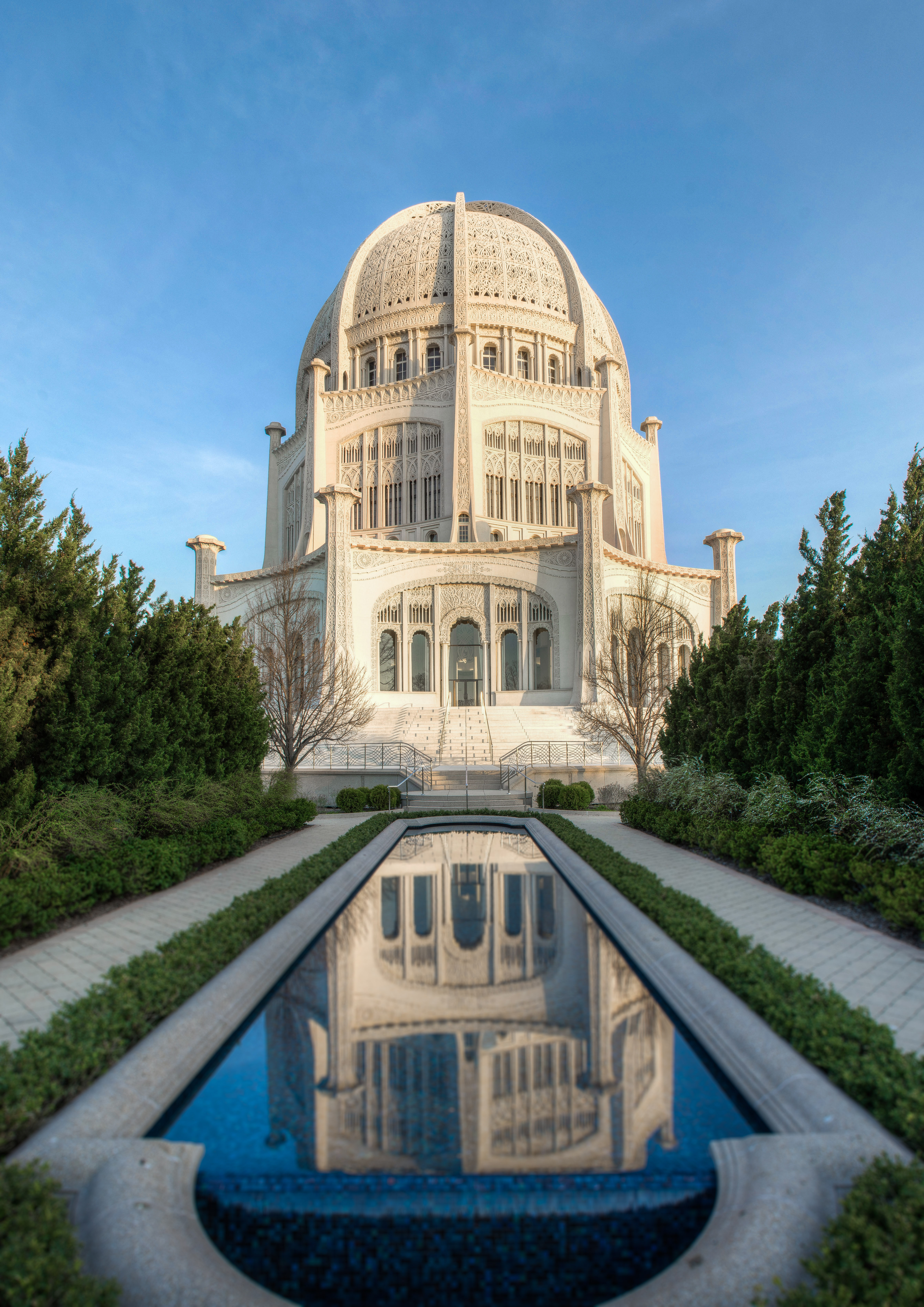

- Location within Illinois Location within the United States
- Location: 100 Linden Ave., Wilmette, Illinois
- Coordinates: 42°4′27″N 87°41′3″W
- Area: 6.97 acres (2.82 ha)
- Built: 1912–1953
- Architects: Louis Bourgeois; George A. Fuller
- Website: www.bahai.us/bahai-temple
- NRHP reference No.: 78001140
- Added to NRHP: May 23, 1978

The Baháʼí House of Worship in Wilmette, Illinois (or Chicago Baháʼí Temple), is a Baháʼí temple. It is the second Baháʼí House of Worship constructed and the oldest one still standing. It is one of eight continental temples, constructed to serve all of North America.

The temple was designed by French-Canadian architect Louis Bourgeois (1856–1930), who received design feedback from ʻAbdu'l-Bahá during a 1920 visit to Haifa. To convey the Baháʼí principle of the unity of religion, Bourgeois incorporated a variety of religious architecture and symbols. Although ʻAbdu'l-Bahá participated in a groundbreaking ceremony in 1912 that laid a cornerstone, construction began in earnest in 1921 and was significantly delayed by the Great Depression and World War II. Construction resumed in 1947. The temple was completed in 1951, and dedicated in a ceremony in 1953.

Baháʼí Houses of Worship are intended to include several social, humanitarian, and educational institutions clustered around the temple, although none have been built to such an extent. The temples are not intended as local meeting places but are open to the public and used as devotional spaces for people of any faith.

== History ==
=== Early plans ===
In 1903, a small group of Baháʼís in downtown Chicago first discussed the idea of a Baháʼí House of Worship in the Chicago area. At the time, the world's first House of Worship was being built in Ashgabat, Russian Turkistan (what is now Turkmenistan). The Ioas family was particularly involved in the first requests. A Baháʼí from Chicago named Corinne Knight True went on pilgrimage to the Ottoman province in the Levant in 1907 to visit ʻAbdu'l-Bahá, then leader of the religion, and tell him of the growing interest in a local house of worship. During Thornton Chase's pilgrimage, he had asked ʻAbdu'l-Bahá about it as well and was directed to work with True as "complete directions" had been given to her. A series of newspaper articles in the fall of 1908 including Chase among a set of women in several newspapers about the aim of the Baháʼís to build it. This interaction led to the next development of a national sense of community: The election of the first national council of the religion, with delegates present from across the US and Canada, in the spring of 1909. Thirty percent of the members elected were women. ʻAbdu'l-Bahá gave his blessing to the project, but recommended that the structure be built away from the Chicago business district, in a more quiet area near Lake Michigan. The Baháʼís considered building the temple in Chicago's Jackson Park or the suburb of Evanston, but eventually settled on Wilmette, Illinois, just north of Evanston. The site chosen for this project was found by True and selected for its proximity to lake Michigan and natural elevation. True began coordinating work and acted as the treasurer of the growing effort and it became a solace to her life in the face of many personal challenges. Subsequently, American Baháʼís came to refer to her as "the mother of the Temple" and she was eventually appointed one of the Hands of the Cause of the religion. The Baháʼí administrative body True initiated by direction of ʻAbdu'l-Bahá, the Baháʼí Temple Unity, began purchasing land and gradually assumed larger responsibilities across communities until it was renamed the National Spiritual Assembly.

Baháʼís from around the world gradually raised funds to pay for the project. For example, French Bahá'ís were noted as contributing even after facing the January 1910 Great Flood of Paris. A Chicago resident named Nettie Tobin, unable to contribute any money, famously donated a discarded piece of limestone from a construction site. This stone became the symbolic cornerstone of the building when ʻAbdu'l-Bahá arrived in Wilmette in 1912 for the ground-breaking ceremony during his journeys to the West. The actual construction of the building did not begin until the 1920s, after Baháʼís agreed to use a design by Louis Bourgeois. The design was seen as a mixture of many different architectural styles.

=== Construction ===
By 1922, the first part of the building, the Foundation Hall, was mostly finished, and Baháʼís began using it as a meeting place. Progress on construction soon stalled, however, as funds began to dwindle, and residents of Wilmette began expressing displeasure with the construction site. At this point, many strange rumors about the structure began to circulate. Some people believed that the building was used by the Baháʼís to keep a live white whale. Others said that the building was a refueling station for captured German submarines that had been brought to the Great Lakes.

Construction resumed as contributions from Baháʼís began to increase, and in 1930, the George A. Fuller Company was hired to complete the building's superstructure. The superstructure was completed in 1931, and a year later, John Joseph Earley was hired to begin work on the building's concrete cladding. A model of the temple was placed on display at Chicago's 1933–34 Century of Progress Exposition, and people began travelling to Wilmette to see the building taking shape. The temple was featured in a privately issued postal stationery cover on the occasion of the 20th anniversary of US airmail service in 1938. The exterior of the building was completed in January 1943.

Work remained to be done on the interior cladding of the structure, as well as the landscaping around the building. Louis Bourgeois' designs for the interior were incomplete. He had died in 1930, before he could finish his plans, so in 1947, Alfred Shaw was hired to work on the interior detailing of the building. By the 1940s the temple was again featured on a privately issued postal stationery cover and was used by the US Navy during World War II as a rendezvous point for training fighter pilots from the nearby Glenview Naval Air Station, and, by 1946 to mark a flightpath of a Navy Mars Seaplane. A plan for the building's gardens was approved in 1951, based on a design by Hilbert E. Dahl.

=== Dedication and afterwards ===
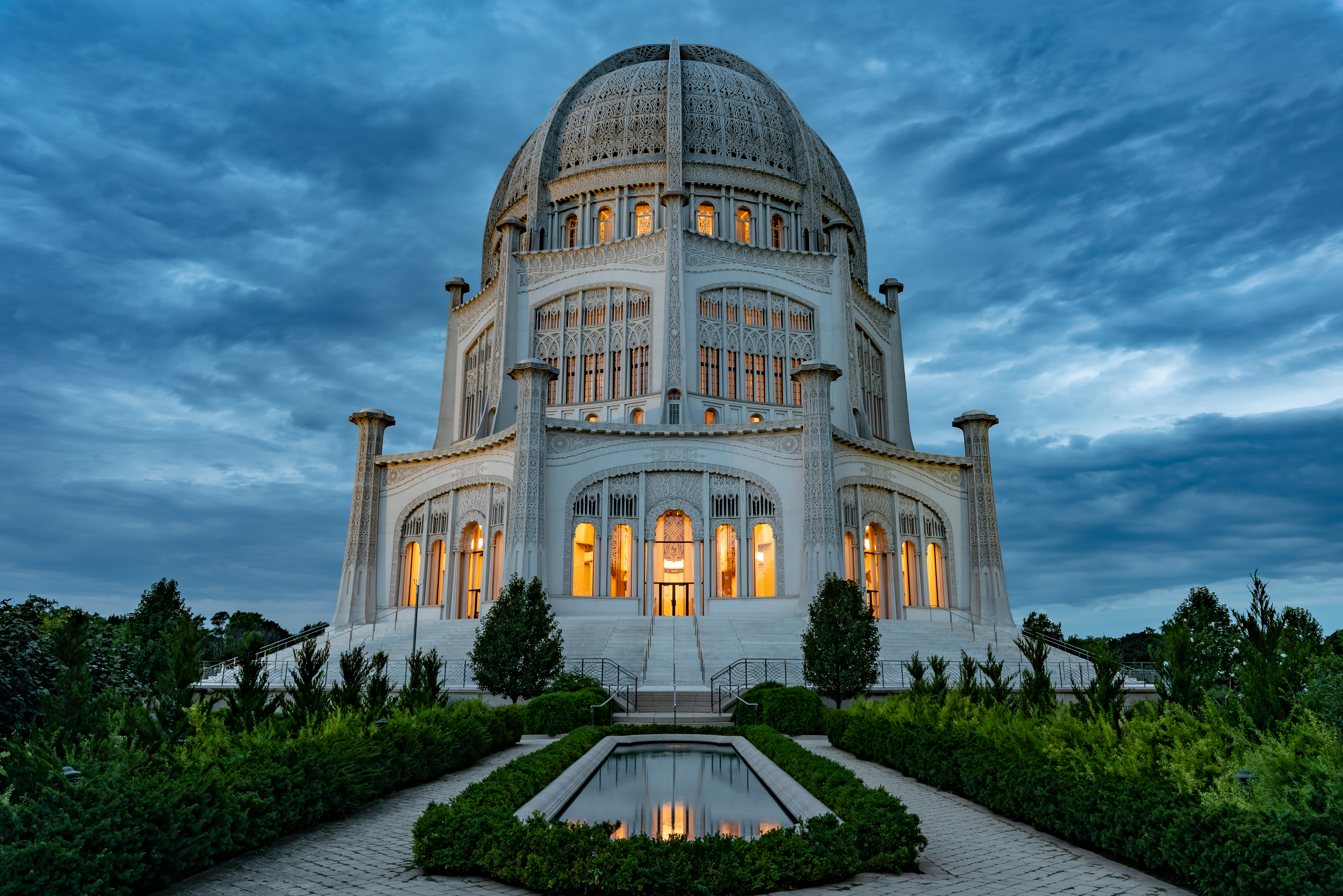
The Baháʼí House of Worship at dusk in August 2018

The temple was finally dedicated on May 2, 1953. Over 3,500 people attended the services, including 91-year-old Corinne True. Rúhíyyih Khánum, the wife of Shoghi Effendi (head of the religion after the death of ʻAbdu'l-Bahá), read a prayer at the dedication. Several prominent figures, such as Supreme Court Justice William O. Douglas and future justice Thurgood Marshall, sent messages of praise to the Baháʼís.

From 1958–2001, the Wilmette Bahá'í House of Worship was associated with a "home for the aged", operated by the U.S. Bahá'í community. The Bahá'í Home has since closed, although the building remains in use for a local Bahá'í School and a regional training center. A new welcome centre for the House of Worship was completed in 2015, described as connecting the temple with the community, including Bahá'ís and non-Bahá'ís.

== Features ==
Features

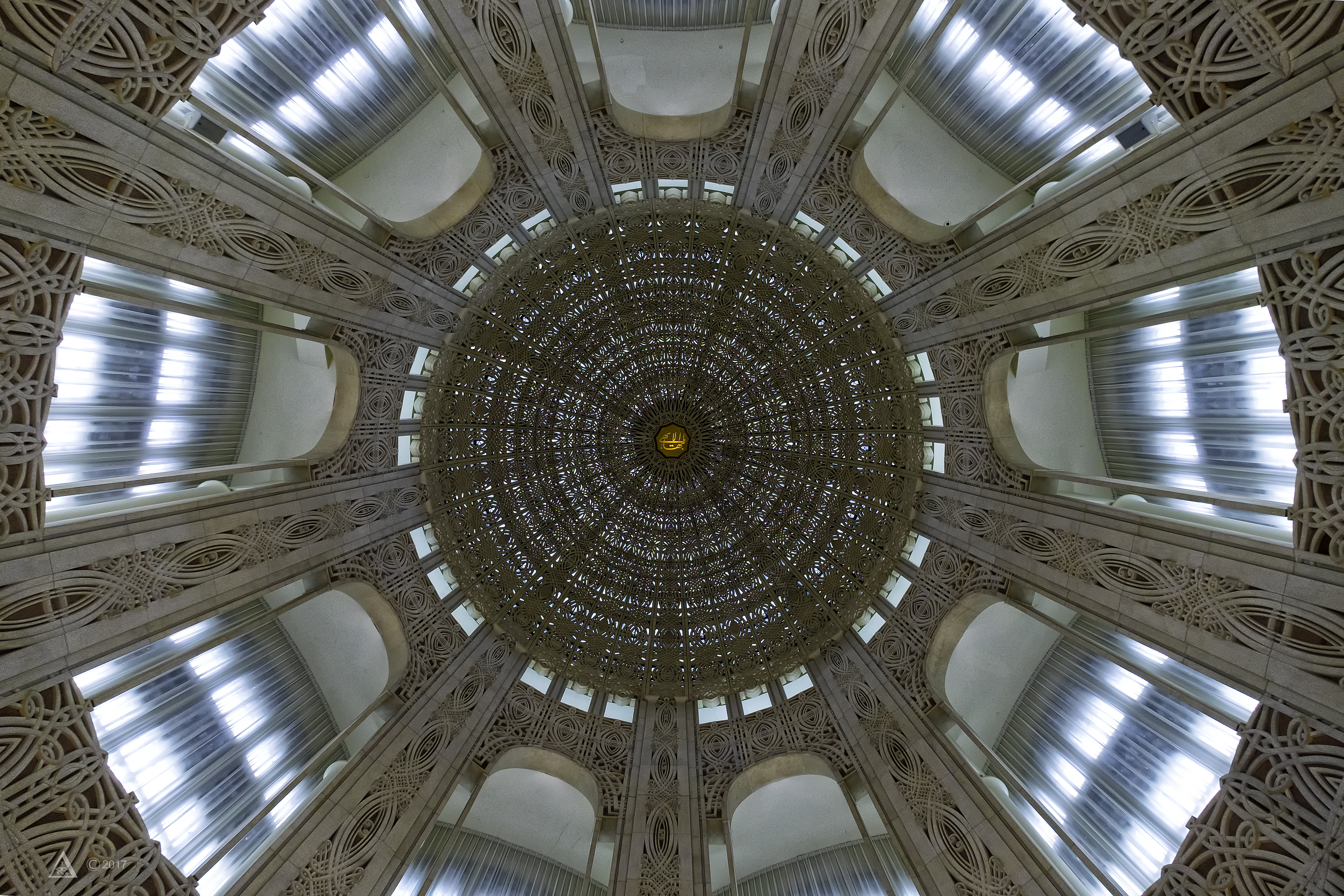
The "Greatest Name" in the center of the dome ceiling

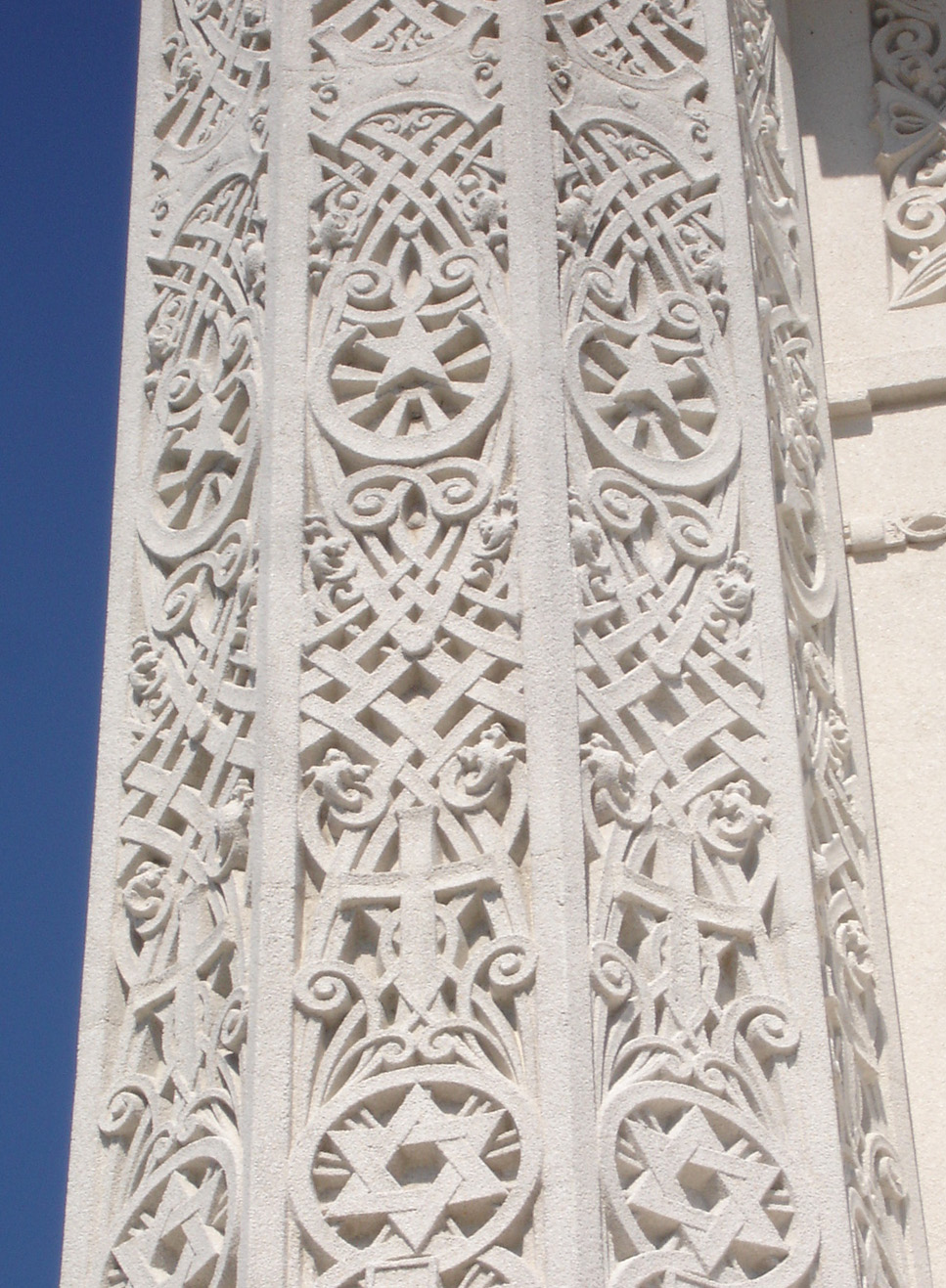
One of the nine pillars

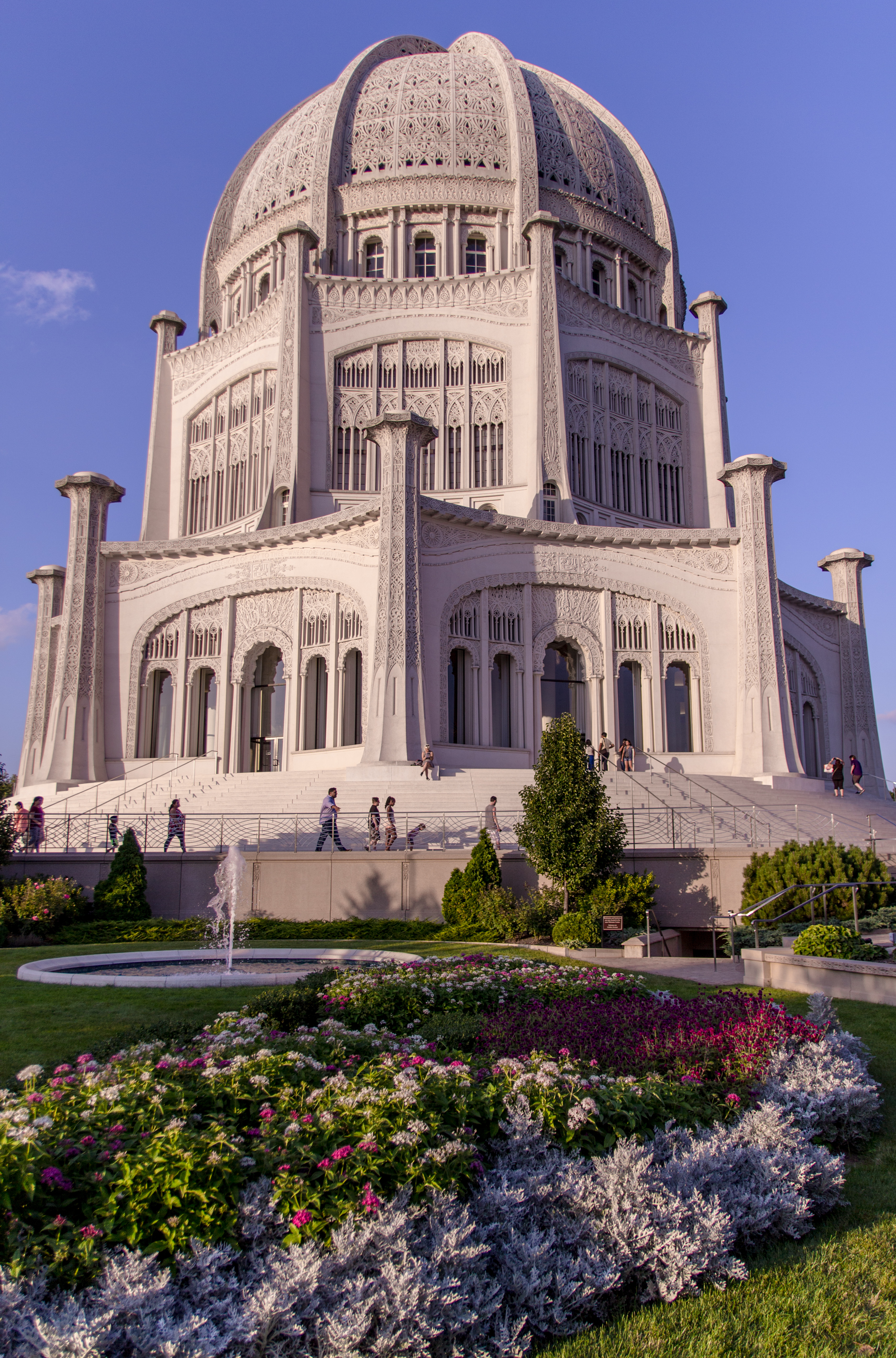
A garden surrounds the structure

The top of the dome is made up of intricate lace-style masonry

The House of Worship is a domed structure surrounded by gardens and fountains on a 6.97-acre (2.82 ha) plot of land. The building is 58.2 metres tall. The space between the floor of the auditorium and the ceiling of the dome measures 138 feet (42 m) high, and the interior of the dome is 72 feet (22 m) in diameter. The auditorium seats 1,191 people.

Since nine is the last number in the decimal system, Baháʼís believe it symbolizes perfection and completion. Nine is also the value of the word Bahá (Arabic for "glory") in Abjad numerology. Thus, many elements of the building occur in groups of nine. For example, there are nine entrances to the auditorium, nine interior alcoves, nine dome sections, and nine fountains in the garden area.

The cladding of the building is composed of a concrete mixture of portland cement and two types of quartz. Many intricate details are carved into the concrete. Various writings of Baháʼu'lláh, the founder of the religion, are inscribed above the building entrances and inside the interior alcoves. Symbols of many religions, such as the Christian cross, the Star of David, and the star and crescent, can be found in each exterior pillar. The pillars are also decorated with a symbol in the form of a swastika, which is also used by Hindus and Buddhists. At the top of each pillar is a nine-pointed star, symbolizing the Baháʼí Faith.

Inside the center of the dome ceiling, one can see an Arabic inscription. This is a Baháʼí symbol called the "Greatest Name"; the script translates as "O Thou Glory of Glories". The secretary of Shoghi Effendi writing on his behalf explained, "By 'Greatest Name' is meant that Baháʼu'lláh has appeared in God's greatest name, in other words, that he is the supreme Manifestation of God."

Architect Louis Bourgeois' former studio sits across the street from the House of Worship at 536 Sheridan Road.

Video of the exterior of the building

== Recognition ==
In 1978, the House of Worship was added to the National Register of Historic Places. The building has become a popular destination for tourists, and the Illinois Office of Tourism has named it one of the "Seven Wonders of Illinois". In 2012, the Bahá'í community of the United States celebrated the 100 years of the temple cornerstone dedication. In celebration of the 2018 Illinois Bicentennial, the Bahá'í House of Worship was selected as one of the Illinois 200 Great Places by the American Institute of Architects Illinois component (AIA Illinois) and was recognized by USA Today Travel magazine, as one of AIA Illinois' selections for Illinois 25 Must See Places. In 2019, a photo of the Wilmette Bahá'í House of Worship was among the 15 winners of the annual international Wiki Loves Monuments photo contest.

== Image gallery ==
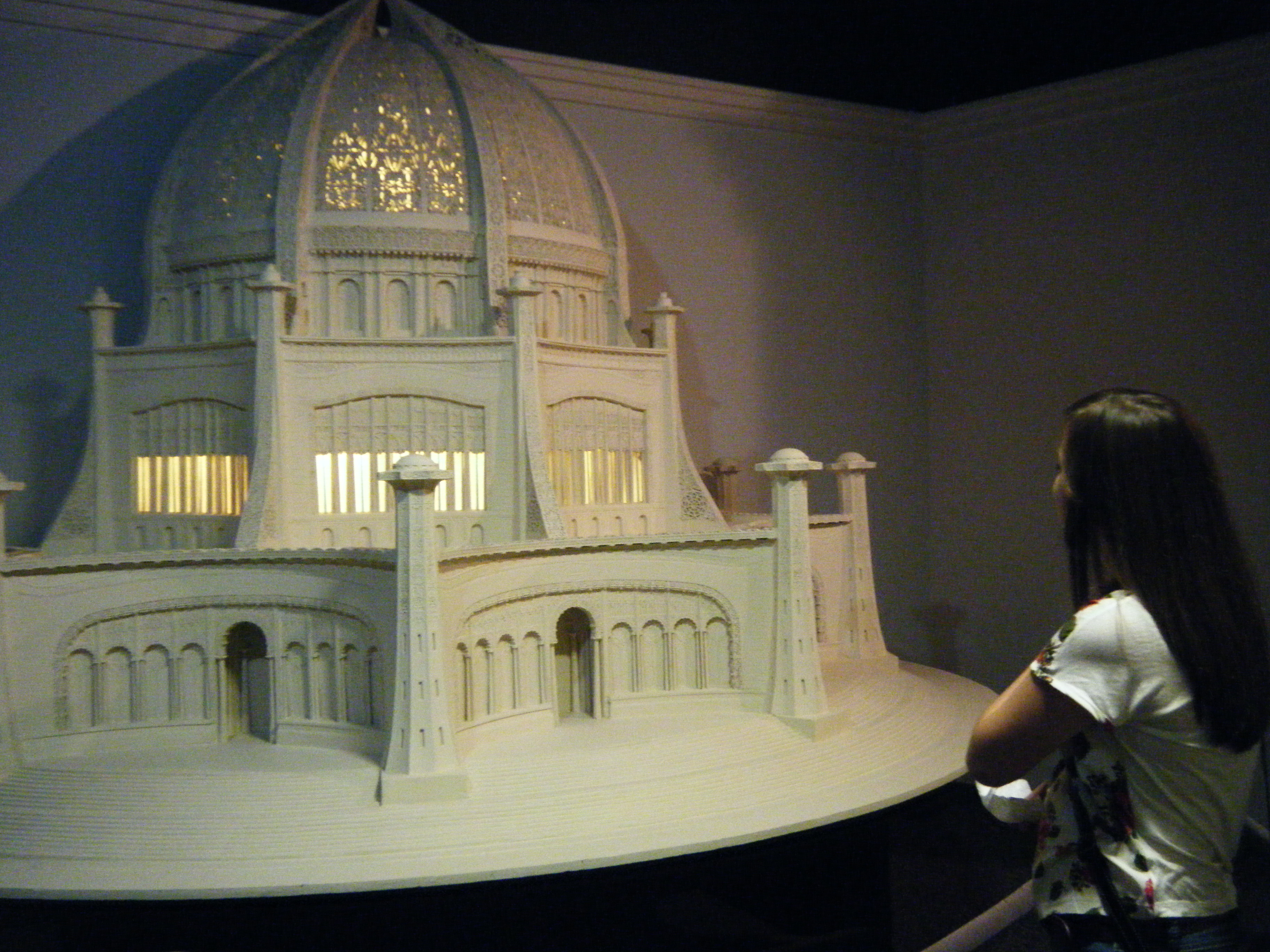
Original architectural model by Louis Bourgeois

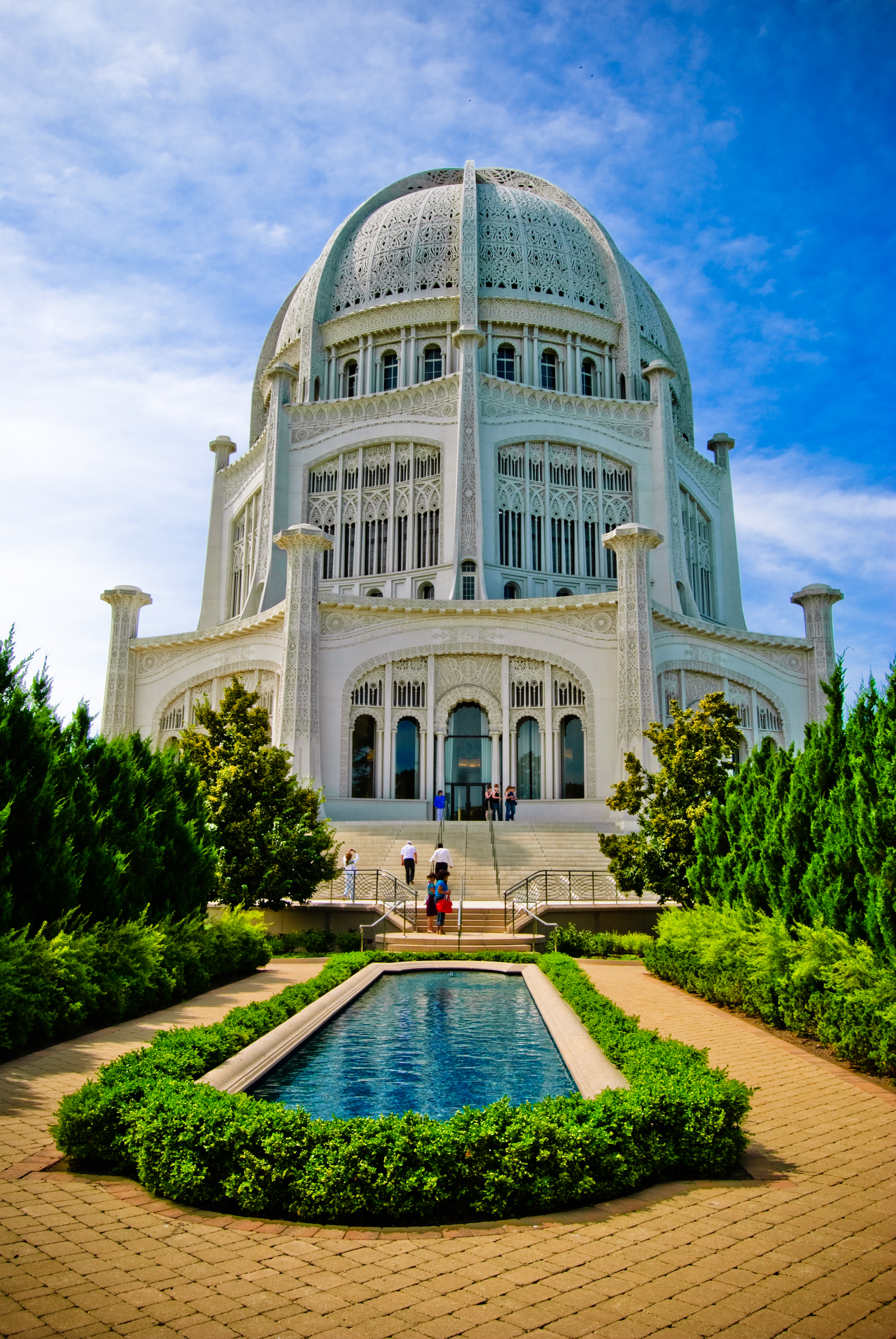
Main entrance

== See also ==
- Lotus Temple
- Sydney Baháʼí Temple
- Baháʼí teachings
- Prayer in the Baháʼí Faith
- Baháʼí Faith in the United States
- Tourism in Chicago
- Religion in the United States
