= Stanley Warner Corporation =

American movie theater chain

The Stanley Warner Corporation, also known as Stanley Warner Theatres, was an American movie theater chain that existed from 1953 until 1967 when it was acquired by the Glen Alden Corporation to form RKO–Stanley Warner Theatres. Its headquarters were located in Manhattan at 1585 Broadway.

== History ==
The Stanley Warner Corporation (SWC) had its roots in the Warner Bros. Pictures company, who merged with the Stanley Company of America (SCA) theater chain in 1928, the largest theater holding company in the world, which also controlled First National Pictures. This history informed the crafting of the SWC's name. Warner Bros. used the former SCA theaters to start their Warner Bros. Theatres chain empire which existed from 1928 until it was forced by consent decree to divest itself of its 436 theaters following an antitrust lawsuit. The consent decree made with the United States Department of Justice was reached on January 5, 1951 and in December 1952 a sale of the theaters was made to (Fabian Theaters) Fabian Enterprises Inc. Stockholders voted to form a new company to oversee the theatre chain purchased by Simon H. Fabian (Fabian Enterprises), and the SWC was formally incorporated on January 30, 1953.

The newly formed SWC was led by Simon H. Fabian, Warner Brother's Board of Directors and son of Jacob Fabian; one of the leaders of Stanley and First National before the 1928 merger. In 1954 the SWC purchased the International Latex Corporation (now Playtex). The Warner Cinerama theater was one of its theaters, and the company partnered with the Cinerama corporation to operate that venue. The company was also under contract to co-produce Cinerama technology films with the Cinerama company for a five year period during the 1950s. The company funded the development of Hans Laube's Smell-O-Vision after seeing a demonstration of his 1955 short film My Dream demonstrating a prototype of the technology.

In 1953, Van Curler Broadcasting Company, a subsidiary of Stanley Warner, received a construction permit for a new television station in the Albany, New York, area. The station began broadcasting as WTRI on channel 35 on February 28, 1954, and moved to channel 13 as WAST on January 1, 1959. Stockholders included Samuel Rosen (Treasurer and a director), brother-in-law of S. H. Fabian (Director) and an uncle of the latter's son, Edward L. Fabian (Assistant Secretary). These three stockholders, together with Louis R. Golding (Director), were associated with Fabian Theaters (Fabian Enterprises).

In 1967 it merged with the Glen Alden Corporation to form RKO–Stanley Warner Theatres, a company which had previously acquired the RKO Theatre Corporation chain owned by RKO Pictures when it too had been forced to relinquish its chain by consent decree. WAST, which had been profitable for several years, was spun off. After an attempt to sell the station to RKO General was scrapped over regulatory concerns, the Sonderling Broadcasting Corporation of Oak Park, Illinois, acquired WAST for $8 million in 1968. In 1971, RKO–Stanley Warner was sold to the Cinerama corporation.
