= Daeida Wilcox Beveridge =

Co-founder of Hollywood (1861–1914)

- Born: July 22, 1861; Hicksville, Ohio, US
- Died: August 7, 1914 (aged 53)
- Occupation: Businesswoman
- Known for: founder of Hollywood
- Spouse(s): Harvey Henderson Wilcox; Philo J. Beveridge

Daeida Hartell Wilcox Beveridge (/daɪˈiːdə/; July 22, 1861 – August 7, 1914) donated land, named, and founded Hollywood, northwest of Los Angeles, California, in 1888.

== Early life ==
She was born Ida Hartell in Hicksville, Ohio, the daughter of farmers Amelia and John Emerson Hartell. She attended private school in Hicksville and later public school in Canton, Ohio.

== Hollywood ==
Soon after she and her first husband Harvey H. Wilcox acquired their new ranch, Daeida reportedly visited her hometown of Hicksville. According to lore, Daeida heard the name Hollywood from another traveler, who owned an estate by that name in Illinois.

By February 1887, the Wilcoxes began to lay out a new town on their ranch, later filing a subdivision map for "Hollywood, California", with the Los Angeles County Recorder's office. Their ranch, purchased at $150 an acre, was sold for $1,000 per lot. The 1880s real estate boom busted that same year, yet Hollywood began its slow growth.

With her second husband Philo T. Beveridge, Daeida continued leading development efforts and was instrumental in establishing much of Hollywood's civic infrastructure, including the city hall, library, police station, primary school, tennis club, post office, city park, and one of the two original commercial districts. She built the Hollywood National Bank and Citizens Savings Bank, a post office, a theatrical playhouse, and the city's first sidewalks. She gave land for three churches, and donated three prime lots on Cahuenga Boulevard and on Prospect (Hollywood Boulevard) to the painter Paul de Longpré, for an estate that came to include extensive flower gardens and a Mission Revival style mansion with a public art gallery. It became a popular tourist attraction.

== Personal life ==
She married prohibitionist Harvey Henderson Wilcox in Topeka, KS in 1882. In 1884 they moved to Southern California and in 1886 they purchased a 120 acres (0.49 km^{2}) ranch of apricot and fig groves outside of Los Angeles at the foot of the Hollywood Hills. Harvey Wilcox died in 1891.

In 1894, Daeida married Philo J. Beveridge, a businessman and prominent citizen of Hollywood, the son of an Illinois governor, who shared her vision of community. The Beveridges had four children

== Death ==
She came to be called the "Mother of Hollywood". Daeida Wilcox Beveridge died of cancer on 7 August 1914.

The Los Angeles Times obituary stated that it was Daeida's dream of beauty that gave world fame to Hollywood, years before the first movie company arrived in 1913. Her associates said she was "reliable, forcible, kindly, a woman of rare judgment, and a worthy opponent."

Daeida Hartell Wilcox Beveridge was inducted into the Ohio Women's Hall of Fame in 1995.

== Namesakes ==
- Wilcox Avenue — a north/south street, one block west of Cahuenga Boulevard in Hollywood and Hancock Park, Los Angeles.
- Wilcox Post Office—Hollywood Station (United States Post Office, Hollywood, California).
- Wilcox Police Station—Hollywood Community Police Station.
- Daeida Magazine — Daeida.com: Daeida Magazine.com: Hollywood's People, Passions, and Its Past

== See also ==
- Rancho La Brea
