= Hollywood Pacific Theatre =

Theater in Los Angeles, California

- U.S. Historic district – Contributing property
- Los Angeles Historic-Cultural Monument
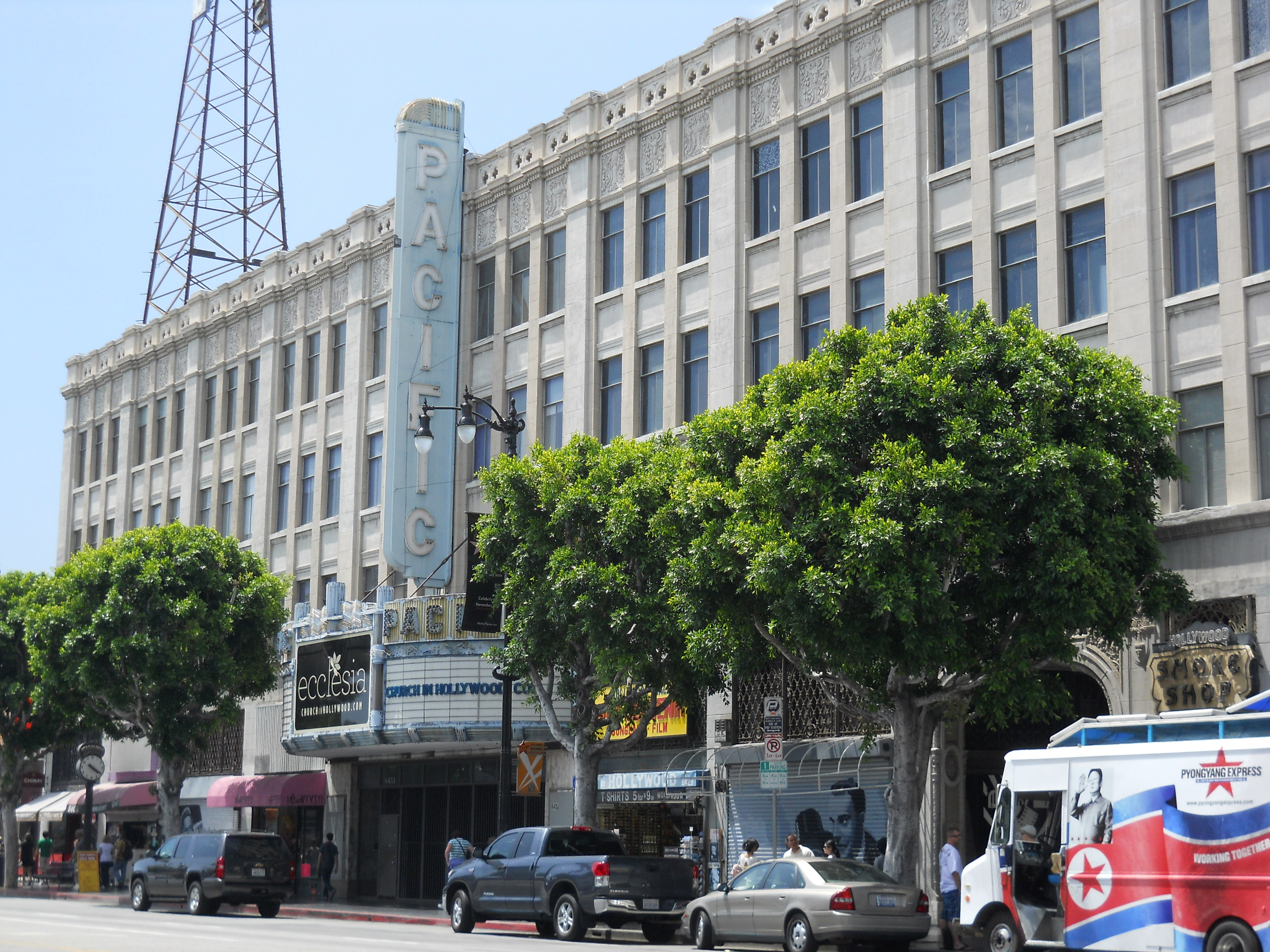
- Hollywood Pacific Theatre in 2010

- Location within the Los Angeles metropolitan area
- Location: 6423-6445 Hollywood Blvd. and 1700-1718 Wilcox Avenue, Hollywood, California
- Coordinates: 34°06′07″N 118°19′50″W
- Built: 1927
- Architect: G. Albert Lansburgh
- Architectural style: Spanish renaissance, Beaux-Arts
- Part of: Hollywood Boulevard Commercial and Entertainment District (ID85000704)
- LAHCM No.: 572

Significant dates
- Designated CP: April 4, 1985
- Designated LAHCM: February 9, 1993

Hollywood Pacific Theatre, also known as Warner Theatre, Warner Bros. Theatre, Warner Hollywood, Warner Cinerama, Warner Pacific, and Pacific 1-2-3, is a historic office, retail, and entertainment space located at 6423-6445 Hollywood Boulevard and 1700-1718 Wilcox Avenue in Hollywood, Los Angeles, California. It is best known for its movie theater, which was owned by Warner Bros. Pictures from 1928 to 1953, Stanley Warner Theatres (later RKO-Stanley Warner Theatres) from 1953 to 1968, and Pacific Theatres from 1968 to 1994.

== History ==
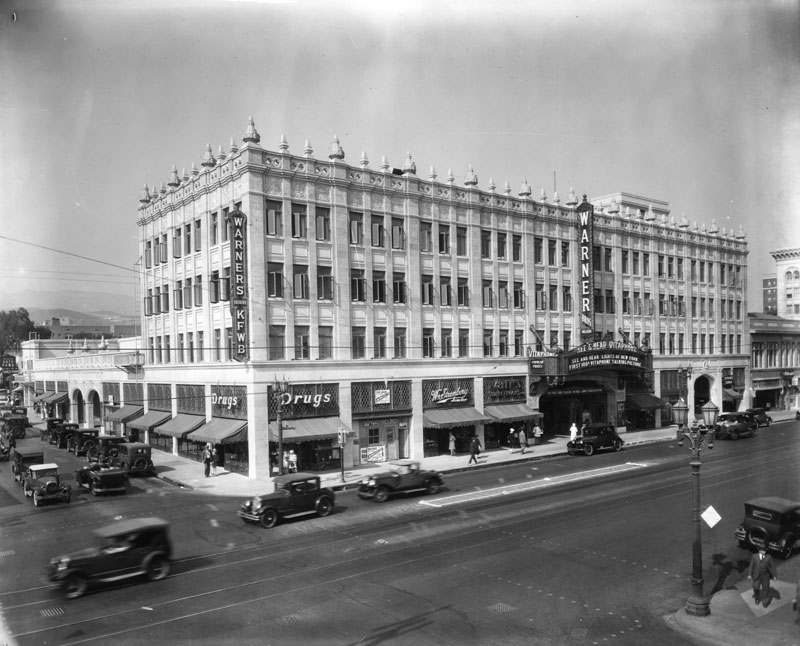
The building in 1928

=== Beginnings ===
Originally known as Warner Bros. Theatre or Warner Hollywood, the latter used to avoid confusion with another Warner Theatre in downtown Los Angeles, this building was designed by G. Albert Lansburgh, an architect renowned for his theater designs, having previously designed the Palace, Orpheum, El Capitan, and more. The total cost of this building was $2 million ($37.5 million in 2025), $750,000 more than budgeted. It was built on the former site of Paul de Longpré's residence.

The building's centerpiece, its movie theater, was Hollywood's first movie theater designed specifically for sound. The theater was meant to open in 1927 showing The Jazz Singer, but construction overruns and Sam Warner's death prevented this. Instead, the theater opened on April 26, 1928 with a showing of Glorious Betsy. The Jazz Singer star Al Jolson emceed the opening, which marked Warner Brothers's entry into the theater business in California. The theater sat more than 2,700 and was built to complete directly with Grauman's Chinese and Egyptian.

In addition to the theater, the building featured a nursery, emergency hospital, lounge, retail and office space, and a 3,000 square feet (280 m^{2}) radio studio. Radio station KFWB occupied the studio, and two radio masts were added to the building soon after it opened, with the station's letters displayed on the masts.

=== Change in ownership and renovations ===
In 1949, the United States Supreme Court issued the Paramount Decision, prohibiting major film studios from owning movie theaters. To comply, Warner Brothers spun off Stanley Warner Theatres in 1953, at which point this building transferred ownership to that company. Stanley Warner Theatres later merged with RKO Theatres Corp to become RKO Stanley Warner.

In the 1950s, when theaters tried to compete with television by introducing widescreen, this venue was one of the few in Hollywood large enough to convert to Cinerama. After renovations, the theater reopened as Warner Cinerama on April 29, 1953. The new screen was 28 by 76 feet (8.5 m × 23.2 m) with a 146 degree arc and seating was reduced to approximately 1,500 to accommodate the larger screen.

The first film shown at the Warner Cinerama was This is Cinerama, which grossed $3,845,200 ($46.1 million in 2025) in its first 115 weeks, a Los Angeles record. The film closed 133 weeks after opening and on November 15, 1955, Cinerama Holiday opened, playing for 81 weeks and grossing $2,212,600 ($26.2 million in 2025). That film was followed by Seven Wonders of the World, which played for 69 weeks and grossed $1,659,361 ($18.5 million in 2025). Other cinerama films that played in this theater include South Seas Adventure (71 weeks), Search for Paradise (38 weeks), The Wonderful World of the Brothers Grimm (28 weeks), and the premiere run of How the West Was Won (93 weeks). This is Cinerama, Cinerama Holiday, and Seven Wonders of the World also had multi-week return engagements during this time period.

In 1961, the theater was equipped to show 70 mm film and in 1968, it was sold to Pacific Theatres, who renamed it Hollywood Pacific Theatre. In the late 1960s and early 1970s, two Stanley Kubrick films had long runs at the theater: 2001: A Space Odyssey, which had its west coast premiere here and played for 80 weeks, and A Clockwork Orange.

In January 1978, the theater closed so that its balcony section could be converted into two additional 550-seat screens. The theater reopened in April 1978, having changed its name to Pacific 1-2-3.

=== Influence on Carol Burnett's Hollywood Walk of Fame star ===
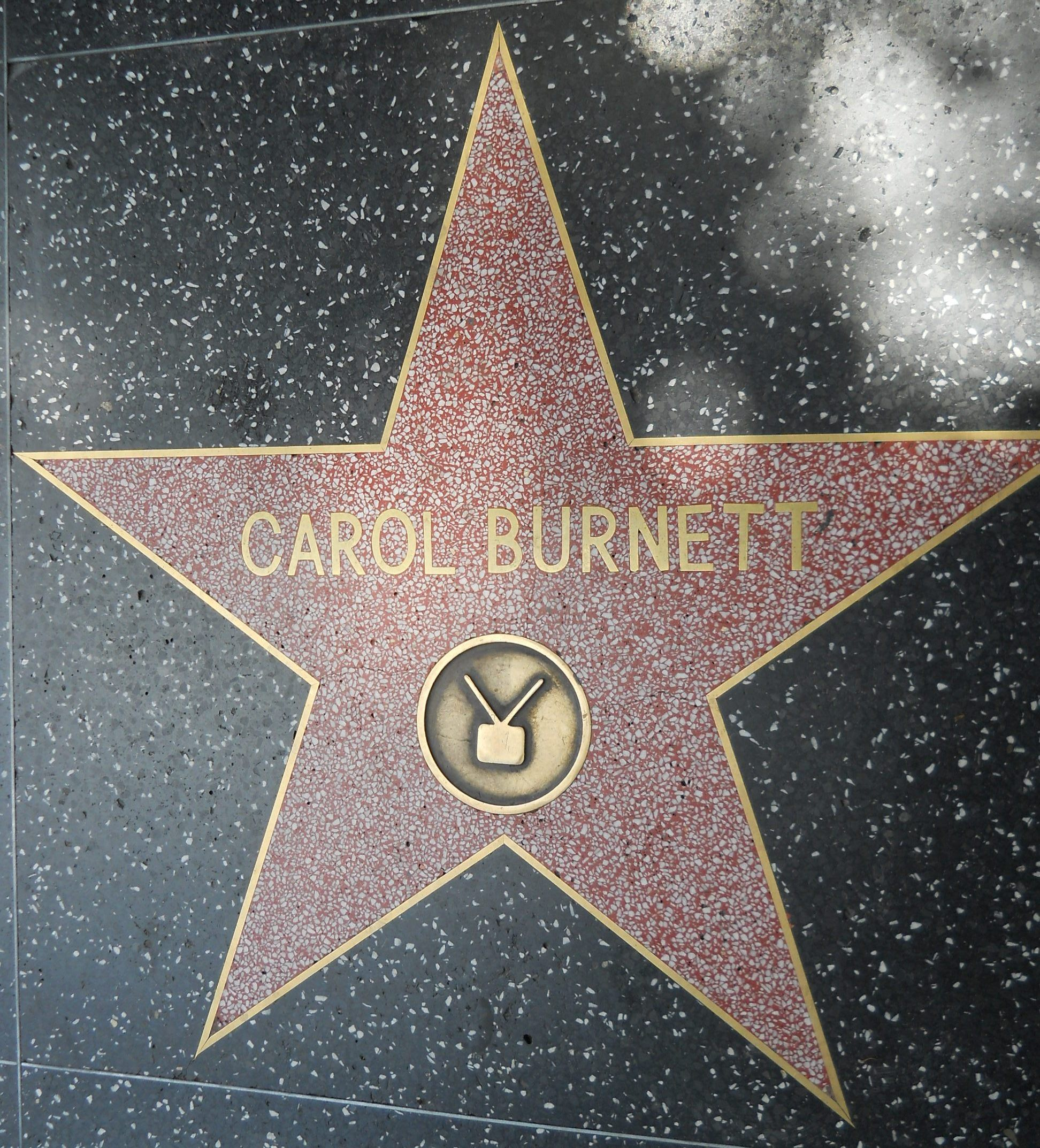
Carol Burnett's star on the Hollywood Walk of Fame at 6439 Hollywood Blvd. in front of the Hollywood Pacific Theatre

In the 1950s, a young Carol Burnett worked as an usherette in this theater, and during a screening of Alfred Hitchcock's Strangers on a Train, she advised two patrons arriving during the last ten minutes to wait for the beginning of the next screening to avoid spoiling the ending. The manager observed Burnett, let the couple in, and then fired her, stripping the epaulettes from her uniform. Decades later, when Carol Burnett was offered a star on the Hollywood Walk of Fame, she said she wanted it "right in front of where the old Warner Brothers Theater was, at Hollywood and Wilcox." Her star was placed at 6439 Hollywood Blvd., outside the entrance to the theater.

=== Designation as a Historical Landmark ===
In 1985, the Hollywood Boulevard Commercial and Entertainment District was added to the National Register of Historic Places, with Warner Theater listed as a contributing property in the district. In 1993, the building was designated a Los Angeles Historic-Cultural Monument.

=== End of film exhibition ===
The theater closed as a full-time cinema on August 15, 1994, mostly due to structural damage caused by the 1994 Northridge earthquake and water damage that occurred during construction of the B Line. To date, the theater's balcony sections remain closed due to safety issues.

From 2000 to 2006, the building was used by the University of Southern California Entertainment Technology Center to experiment in digital projection. Dubbed the ETC Digital Cinema Lab in Hollywood, the building hosted meetings, discussions, tests, and demos, the results of which are often credited with providing the catalyst that made digital cinema a reality.

The building was occupied by Ecclesia Hollywood Church from early 2008 to 2013 and has been vacant ever since, with owner Robertson Properties Group stating that restoring the building is not financially viable due to the amount of work that needs to be done.

== Architecture and design ==
Hollywood Pacific Theatre is made of reinforced concrete and embellished with cast concrete ornament. It features an elaborate Spanish Renaissance design that includes ornate grillwork, Churrigueresque detailing, and fenestration that is retained between ornate vertical pilasters.

== See also ==
- List of Los Angeles Historic-Cultural Monuments in Hollywood
- List of contributing properties in the Hollywood Boulevard Commercial and Entertainment District
