= Harvey Henderson Wilcox =

Los Angeles businessman (1832–1891)

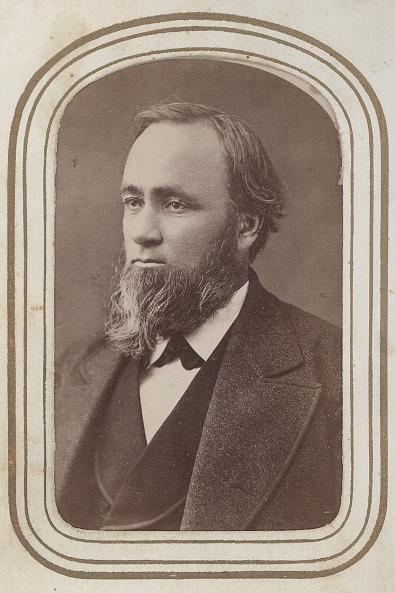
Harvey Henderson Wilcox

Harvey Henderson Wilcox (c. 1832 – March 19, 1891) was an American landowner who registered the name Hollywood for his estate west of the city of Los Angeles in 1887.

Hollywood became the center of the movie industry of the United States in the early 1910s.

== Biography ==
Harvey Henderson Wilcox was born in New York State, most likely in Monroe or Ontario County, the son of Aaron and Azubah (Mark) Wilcox. The family moved to Michigan during the 1830s and Harvey was raised on his parents' farm in Ogden Township, Lenawee County, Michigan. He contracted poliomyelitis in 1845 when he was about 13 years old and used a wheelchair the rest of his life. He is described as being a Kansas Prohibitionist in histories written after his death.

In September 1850 Harvey was described as being an apprentice shoemaker in the Horace Sheldon household in Blissfield, Lenawee County. His apprenticeship was probably because he could not do farm-work. He completed his apprenticeship during the 1850s and in 1860 he was living near Edgerton, St. Joseph Township, Williams County, Ohio, and working as a shoemaker. On December 26, 1861, he married Ellen E. Young in Bryan, Williams County, Ohio. He got into politics in Williams County and ran for, and was elected to, several local offices, including County Recorder in 1860, Justice of the Peace (Magistrate) in 1860, and Notary Public for Williams County in 1866.

He gave up shoemaking to deal in real estate in Bryan, in the firm of Wilcox & Langel, a career that he would follow the rest of his life. Elon Langel later moved to Topeka, Kansas, and died of tuberculosis.

The local Bryan newspaper says in April 1868 that Harvey and Ellen Wilcox were moving to Topeka, Kansas, where, in October, 1869, Harvey published "H.H. Wilcox's Real Estate Publisher" and in July 1870 he was described as a real estate agent and his wife a housekeeper. Before March 1875 they had added G.M. Stanley, the son of Ellen's sister, Alvira, to their family, but they never had any children of their own. In June 1880 Harvey was still in real estate and Ellen was running their boarding house on Kansas Avenue.

Harvey must have enjoyed being in politics in Bryan because in Topeka he got into politics again, serving as president of the city council for at least one term in 1870; joined several other men to found the town of Rossville, Kansas, in 1871; served as Topeka city clerk from at least 1877 through 1880; and owned a ranch and relatively large herd of cattle (that his adopted son, George M. Stanley, managed) near El Dorado in Butler County, Kansas.

Harvey and Ellen were in the 1880 census of Topeka with George M. Stanley, the son of Ellen's sister, Alvira Stanley, in their household. Ellen contracted tuberculosis and spent the winter of 1881–1882 in California, probably staying with her sister, Mary Jane (Young) Bond in Santa Barbara, "chasing the cure". Ellen returned to Topeka, uncured, in early 1882. She was kept alive on the train with "powerful stimulants" and died at the age of 37 soon after her arrival home. She is buried in Topeka Cemetery in Topeka, Kansas.

Harvey married as his second wife, Ida "Daeida" Hartell, a woman 29 years his junior, on December 6, 1882 in Topeka. In October 1883 it was reported that "Harvey Wilcox of Topeka, Kansas" was back in Ohio and Michigan visiting relatives and friends. This was probably the last time most of his relatives back East saw him and the trip was probably made in anticipation of his permanent move to California.

=== Hollywood years ===
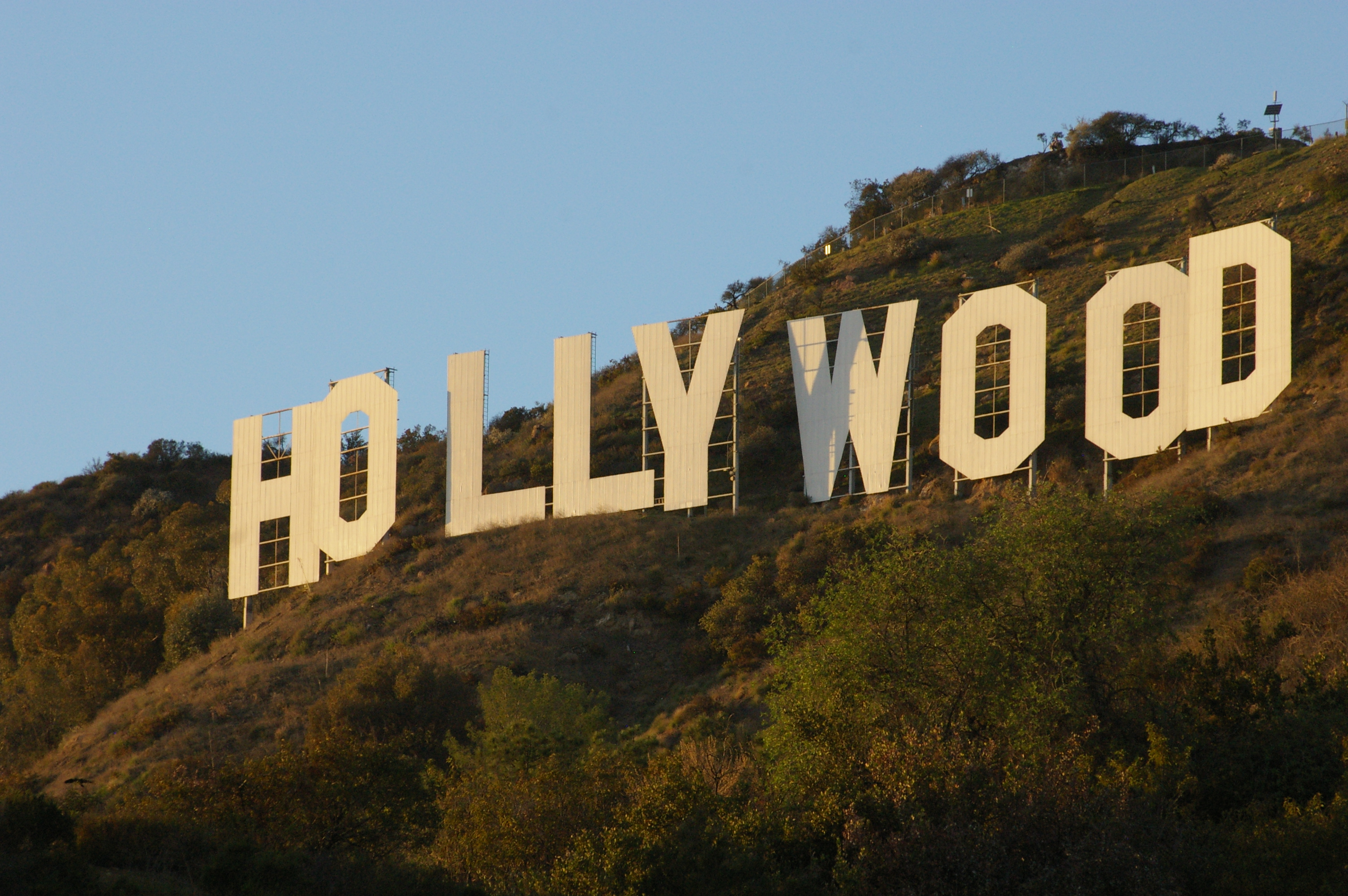
Hollywood Sign.

Harvey and Ida moved from Topeka to Los Angeles in the summer of 1884. Tradition says that Harvey rode in the baggage car with two of his prized horses. In Los Angeles, Harvey formed the real estate company of Wilcox and Shaw. Harvey and Ida had one child, a son named Harry, who died in 1886 at the age of 18 months. Family tradition says that to console themselves over the death of their baby, Harvey and Ida would take buggy rides to the beautiful canyons west of Los Angeles. Harvey purchased one of their favorite areas for $150 per acre. It was in an agricultural area of fig and apricot orchards. Harvey tried his hand at raising fruit, but failed and decided to subdivide the land, selling lots for $1,000 each. His wife named the tract "Hollywood". On February 1, 1887, Harvey filed a plat of the subdivision with the Los Angeles County Recorder's office. He would also develop residential property, "The University Tract", surrounding the newly built University of Southern California in 1887.

Harvey and Ida were not the only members of the family to move to California. At his encouragement, his sister Sarah Luke, brother-in-law Elisha Luke, with her mother, Azubah, took the Atlantic & Pacific Railroad from Ogden to Los Angeles in November 1885 according to Adrian Weekly Press, November 13, 1885. The Lukes planned to stay only for the winter months, but Azaubah intended to remain with her son, Harvey, for the rest of her life. In February 1887 the Lukes and their daughter and son-in-law, Sam and Rosetta Young, with their young son, Almon, and Harvey's recently remarried brother Lewis, left Ogden to permanently settle in Los Angeles where Elisha would also become a real estate agent and land developer. The "Blissfield [Michigan] Advance" said in its Friday, February 18, 1887, edition that "Sam Young and wife and Elisha Luke and wife started for California last Thursday. Thus Ogden loses two of its staunch farmers, and the Prohibs, two valuable members."

Harvey's brother Lewis Wilcox would soon leave California to return to Lenawee County where he would continue as a minister of the United Brethren church in Dundee, Michigan, until his death ten years later. Azubah died in Los Angeles in 1888 and was buried on the Luke family lot in Angelus-Rosedale Cemetery, her son, Harvey, would be buried next to her in 1891.

Harvey's brother Horace is often credited as being a founder of Hollywood, but Horace, who was one of Harvey's younger brothers, stayed in Michigan where he married first Amanda McCourtie and, after her death in 1880, Martha Lord. Horace, who raised purebred Shropshire sheep on his farm in Woodstock Township, Lenawee County, Michigan, was also the Woodstock School Inspector and a teacher until his death in 1916.

There is no original source that says Harvey H. Wilcox was a Prohibitionist, although he probably was. The only known active Prohibitionists in the family were his sister, Sarah, and her husband, Elisha Luke, and almost certainly Harvey's brothers, twins Lewis and Luther, both of whom were ministers.

=== Death ===
Harvey was about fifty-nine years old when he died at his sister-in-law Sylvia Connell's home where he had come two weeks earlier so he could be closer to medical care in Los Angeles. He left a twenty-eight-year-old widow. His funeral was held from the First Methodist church in Hollywood, of which he was a member.

Harvey's obituary in the Adrian newspaper Michigan Messenger, April 1, 1891, says that he left a fortune of $100,000 ($2.37 million in 2008 dollars), so obviously he did not die penniless as some histories suggest. This obituary also confirms his place in the Aaron and Azubah Wilcox family, mentioning his brother, Lewis Wilcox, who at that time lived in Adrian.

Three years after Harvey's death, Daeida, then aged 31, married Philo J. Beveridge, the son of a former governor of Illinois, and a man thirteen years her senior. They had three children.

Wilcox was originally buried alongside his mother, Azubah (Mark) Wilcox, in Rosedale Cemetery, but on November 13, 1922, his remains were moved to Hollywood Memorial Park Cemetery, today named Hollywood Forever Memorial Park where he is interred next to his second wife, Ida.

== See also ==
- Category:Hollywood, Los Angeles history and culture
- Hollywood Sign
