= Cops (film) =

1922 film

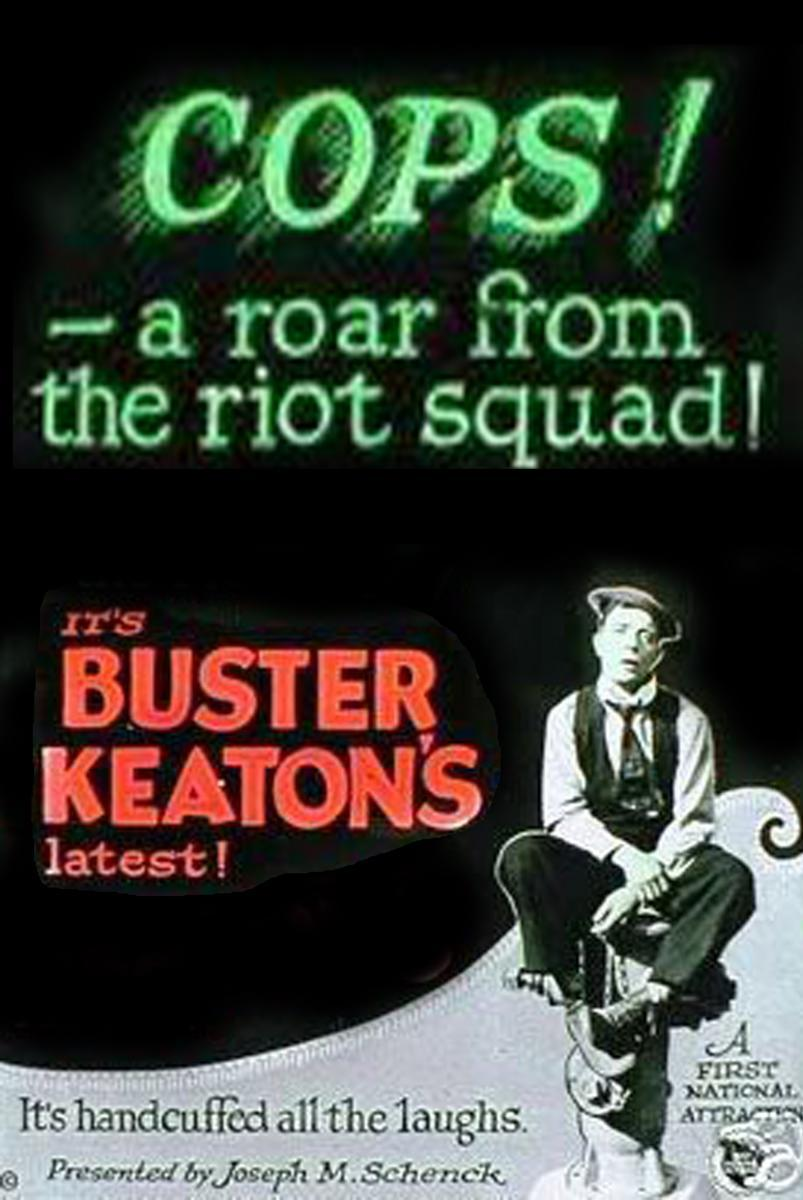
- Theatrical poster
- Directed by: Edward F. Cline; Buster Keaton
- Written by: Edward F. Cline; Buster Keaton
- Produced by: Joseph M. Schenck
- Starring: Buster Keaton; Virginia Fox; Joe Roberts; Edward F. Cline; Steve Murphy
- Cinematography: Elgin Lessley
- Edited by: Buster Keaton
- Distributed by: First National Pictures Inc.
- Release date: March 11, 1922
- Running time: 18 minutes
- Country: United States
- Languages: Silent film English (original intertitles)

Cops is a 1922 American two-reel silent comedy film about a young man (Buster Keaton) who accidentally runs afoul of the entire Los Angeles Police Department during a parade and is chased all over town. It was written and directed by Edward F. Cline and Keaton. The film, which has been referred to as "Kafka-esque", was filmed during the rape-and-murder trial of Keaton’s former collaborator Roscoe "Fatty" Arbuckle, a circumstance that may have influenced the short's tone of hopeless ensnarement.

It was deemed "culturally, historically, or aesthetically significant" by the United States Library of Congress and selected for preservation in their National Film Registry in 1997.

== Plot ==
Cops

The main character is spurned by his love interest, who wants him to become a businessman. Once he leaves her estate, he ends up acquiring a large amount of money from a businessman's wallet. He uses this money to buy up a comically large amount of furniture and a horse to carry this furniture in a carriage. While moving the furniture around town, he faces a variety of comical issues, such as his horse tiring out and accidentally knocking out a cop with his homemade turn signal. Later, he accidentally joins a police parade. A bomb gets thrown off a rooftop and Keaton's character catches it and unwittingly throws it into the parade. This leads to him being chased by a horde of cops.

At the end of the film, Keaton's character manages to lock all the cops in a police station. However, the girl he tried to woo at the beginning of the film (revealed to be the Mayor's daughter) disapproves of his behavior and gives him the cold shoulder. Therefore, he unlocks the police station and is immediately pulled in by the cops. The film ends with the title "The End" written on a tombstone with Keaton's pork pie hat propped on it.

== Cast ==
- Buster Keaton as The Young Man
- Joe Roberts as Police Chief
- Virginia Fox as Mayor's Daughter
- Edward F. Cline as Hobo
- Steve Murphy as Conman selling furniture (uncredited)

== Production ==
Prior to the film's production, John R. Brinkley, an American quack doctor, had become famous for his xenotransplantation of the testicular glands of goats into humans, claiming his procedure could cure male impotence and enhance virility. Cops references this in a short sequence in which Keaton's character takes his horse to a "goat gland specialist"; when the horse emerges, it has become much faster and more energetic.

During the film's initial release individual states had their own censor boards, which would cut films to meet their state's requirements. Surviving prints of this title bear the Pennsylvania State Board of Censors approval logo; Pennsylvania removed the goat gland sequence, and for decades the footage was missing. Around 1980 a surviving uncut print was located and the sequence was re-inserted into the film. Still, many older prints exist without this sequence restored.

Cops was one of many silent films to film in a one-block alley near Hollywood and Cahuenga Boulevard. The alley was later renamed Chaplin-Keaton-Lloyd Alley in recognition of this and other films.

== See also ==
- Buster Keaton filmography
- List of United States comedy films
- 1922 in film
