= Sackett Hotel =

Former hotel in Los Angeles, California, U.S.

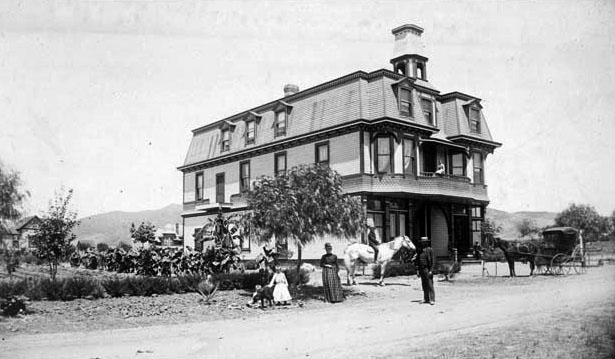
- The hotel in 1888
- Interactive map of the Sackett Hotel area

General information
- Location: Southwest corner of Prospect Avenue and Cahuenga Boulevard
- Coordinates: 34.1015°N 118.3298°W
- Year built: 1888
- Closed: 1905
- Demolished: 1910
- Owner: Horace David Sackett; Ellen Sackett

Technical details
- Material: wood
- Floor count: 3

Sackett Hotel was a hotel located on the southwest corner of Prospect Avenue (now Hollywood Boulevard) and Cahuenga Boulevard in what is now Hollywood, California.

== History ==
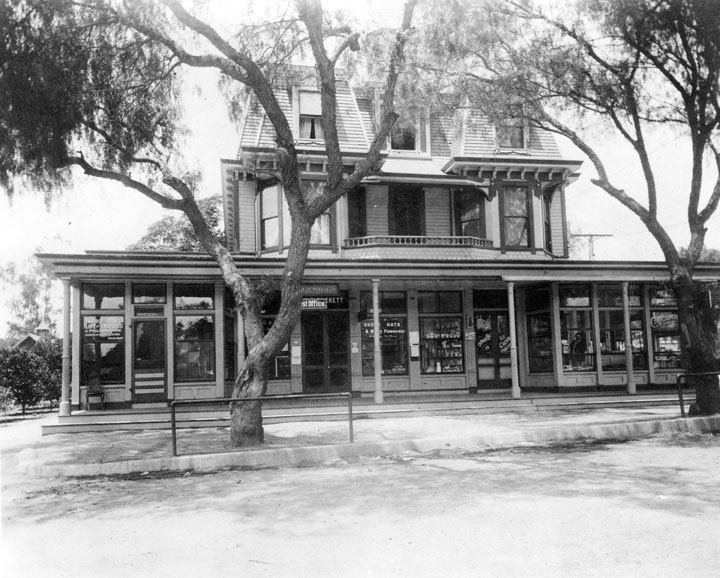
The hotel in 1905

Sackett Hotel, the first hotel in the area that would later be known as Hollywood, was built by Horace David Sackett and Ellen Sackett in 1888, on land bought from Harvey Henderson Wilcox for $2000 ($71,667 in 2025). Located on the corner of Prospect Avenue (Hollywood Boulevard today) and Cahuenga Boulevard, the hotel was three stories tall, featured a mansard roof, and was made of wood.

When the hotel opened, its first floor featured a lobby and parlor facing Prospect and a mercantile shop facing Cahuenga, while its second floor featured eighteen rooms and one community bathroom. Pepper trees surrounded and provided shade to the property, and a large corral and barn were built for guests and neighbors behind the building.

In 1891, the building began housing the area's first post office, which was run by the hotel owners' daughter, Mary Sackett.

Sackett Hotel closed in 1905, as it was unable to compete with the nearby Hollywood Hotel. After closure, the building was sold to Henry Gillig and remained unoccupied for five years. Then, in 1910 the building was sold for $28,000 ($967,500 in 2025) to J.P. Creque, who razed it and built the Creque Building in its place.
