= Weddington House =

Historic building in North Hollywood, California

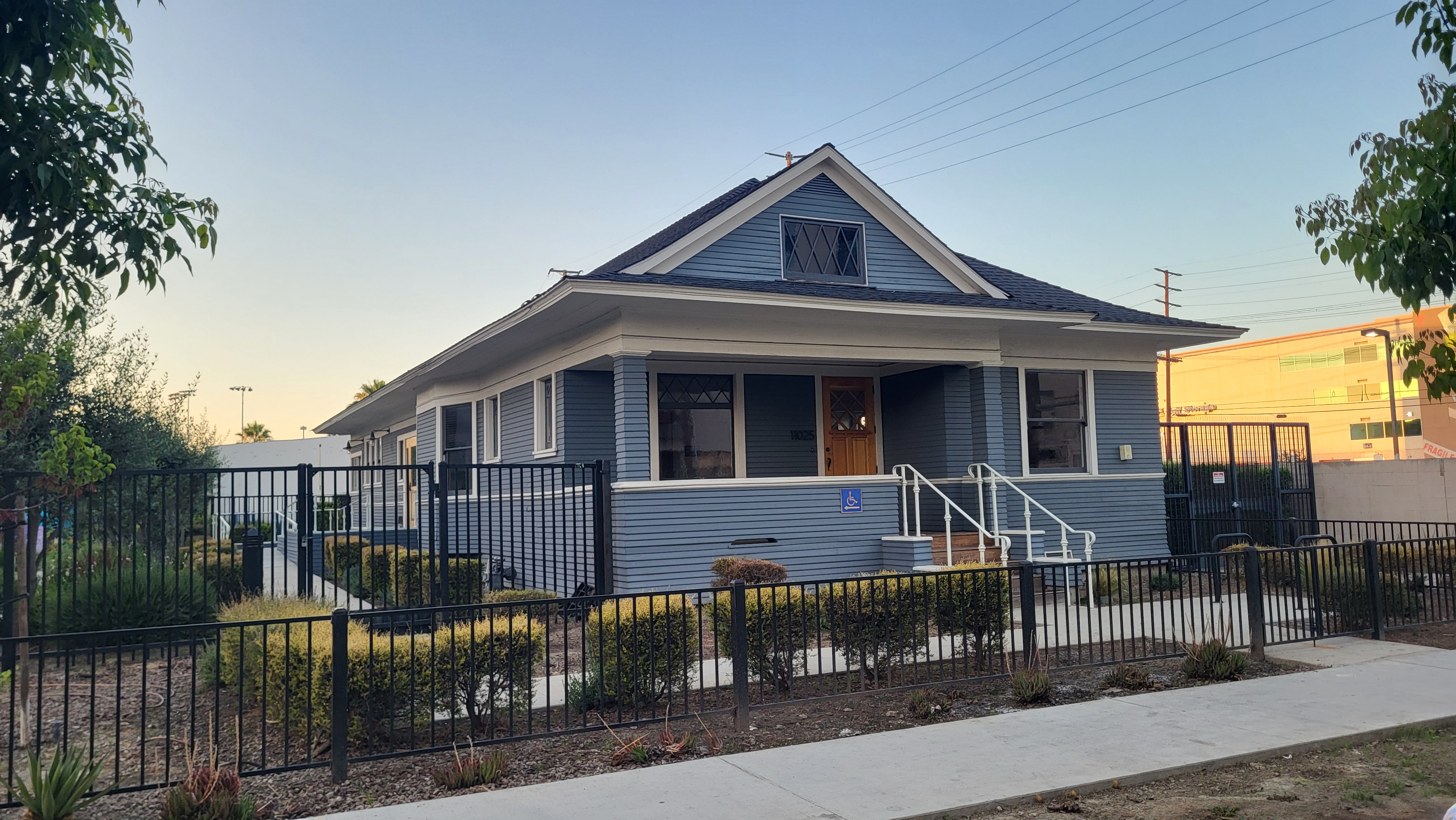
- The building in 2025
- Interactive map of the Weddington House area

General information
- Architectural style: California bungalow, Vernacular
- Location: 11025 Weddington Street, North Hollywood, California
- Coordinates: 34.167°N 118.371°W
- Completed: 1904

Los Angeles Historic-Cultural Monument
- Designated: August 15, 2007
- Reference no.: 883

Weddington House is a historic one-story home located at 11025 Weddington Street in North Hollywood, California. Considered the "mother house" of North Hollywood, it was declared Los Angeles Cultural-Historic Monument No. 883 in 2007.

== History ==
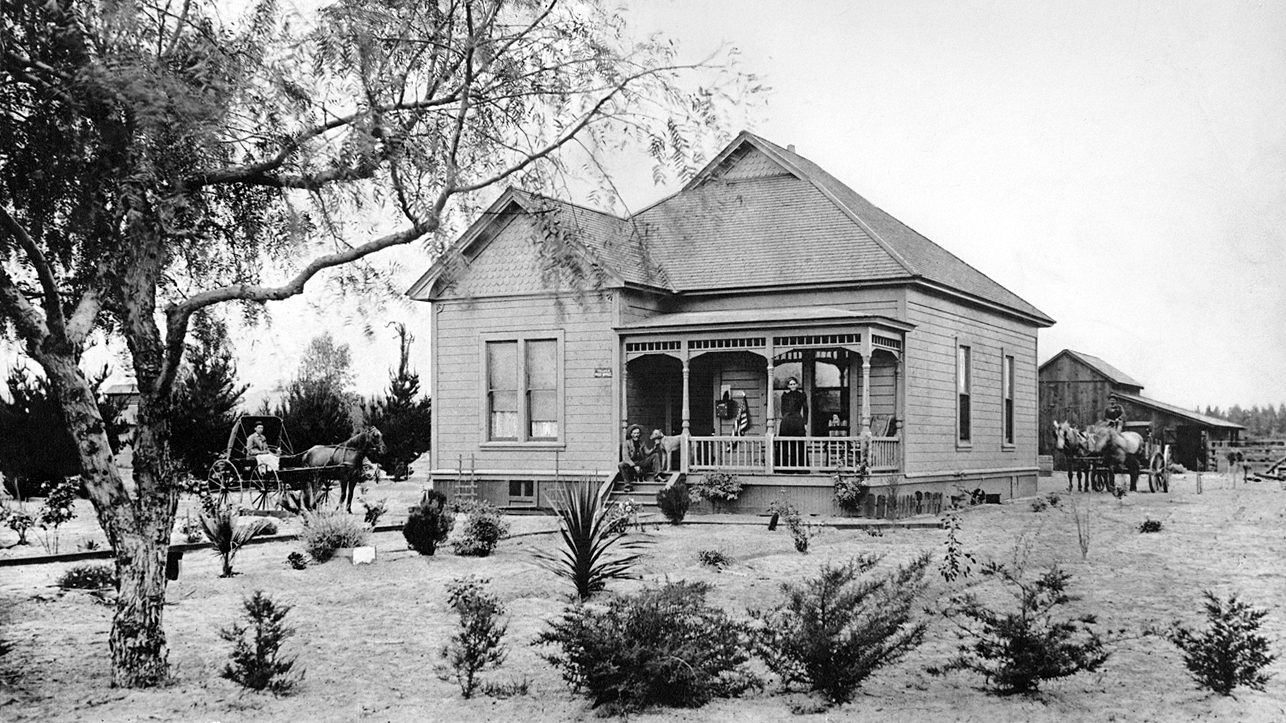
The Weddington family's previous home in 1894

A previous Weddington House was located on Lankershim Boulevard in the late 1800s, with some sources reporting that house was moved to the location of the current Weddington House. However, the Los Angeles Department of City Planning determined through photographs that the previous house does not match the current house in structure or architecture, and thus concluded that the previous house was most likely demolished, not moved. Another source reports that the original house was "completely rebuilt" in 1904 (after the photographs in question were taken), then was moved across the street from its original address, then moved again to the house's current location in 1924. This information matches Weddington House's Los Angeles Historic-Cultural Monument application, and while the application as a whole was accepted, this information was not.

According to the Los Angeles Department of City Planning, Weddington House was built in its current location in 1904 by an unknown architect. The house's owner was the Weddington family, who came from Iowa and established the town of Lankershim in 1890.

In 2006, Weddington House was threatened with demolition to make way for an apartment complex. To prevent this, the house was declared Los Angeles Historic-Cultural Monument No. 883 in 2007. Now, because of this designation, the house must be moved, not destroyed, before another development can be built on the property. Plans were made to move the house to North Hollywood Park, where it would have been converted to a local history museum, but those plans were put on hold due to the real estate market collapse caused by the subprime mortgage crisis. Heritage Square Museum in Lincoln Heights also offered to relocate the house to their property, but the proposal was rejected by community members who wanted the house to stay in its original neighborhood.

Weddington House was occupied until 2007. By 2011, it was boarded up and empty. It has since been restored.

== Architecture and design ==
Weddington House was designed in the California bungalow/Vernacular style and features many character-defining elements, including:

- a front-gabled wood frame
- a recessed half-length front porch with square posts
- a centered entrance
- wood siding on the exterior facade
- double-hung multi-pane windows and bay windows
- a sweeping hipped roof
- built-in cabinetry in the interior

The house is considered to be in good condition despite some alterations.
