= Benjamin Bean Horner =

American architect and photographer (1893–1971

- Born: 1893; Michigan
- Died: May 21, 1971 (aged 77–78)
- Other name: B. B. Horner
- Education: Purdue University
- Occupations: Architect, photographer
- Children: 3

Benjamin Bean Horner (1893–1971), also known as B. B. Horner, sometimes misspelled B. B. Homer, was an American architect who practiced primarily in Los Angeles and Santa Barbara, California. He also took extensive photographs of architecture in California and England.

== Biography ==
Benjamin Bean Horner was born in Michigan in 1893 to William C. Horner, a furniture drafter, and his wife Emily, both of whom were from England. Benjamin and his family lived in Indiana during his teenage years, where he graduated from Purdue University and was a member of Tau Beta Pi. He also served in World War I.

By 1920, Benjamin was single and living in Los Angeles, California, with his occupation listed as technical engineer. Benjamin sailed from New York to England with his first wife Adelaide in 1926, where he photographed many historic buildings, manor houses, and villages. Benjamin also traveled throughout California in the 1920s, where he photographed adobe structures built during the area's Spanish and Mexican periods.

By 1930, Benjamin's occupation had changed to civil engineer and he was still married to his first wife Adelaide. Benjamin married to his second wife, Esther Ruth Vanrossum, in the 1930s. Esther and Benjamin lived in Santa Barbara until 1948, when they moved to Ojai. They had three children together, William (born in 1932) and twins Peter and Benjamin (born in 1935).

Benjamin worked for Douglas Aircraft in the early 1950s and died while traveling abroad in 1971.

== List of works ==
- Residences at 6627 Emmett Terrace, 6658 Emmett Terrace, and 6760 Milner Road (1922), Whitley Heights Historic District contributing properties
- Outpost Building (1927), Hollywood Boulevard Commercial and Entertainment District contributing property
- Creque Building enlargement (1931 or 1934), Hollywood Boulevard Commercial and Entertainment District contributing property
- Croyden House, Montecito, California

== See also ==
- List of American architects
- List of people from Los Angeles
