= Wilson Weddington =

American landowner and pioneer

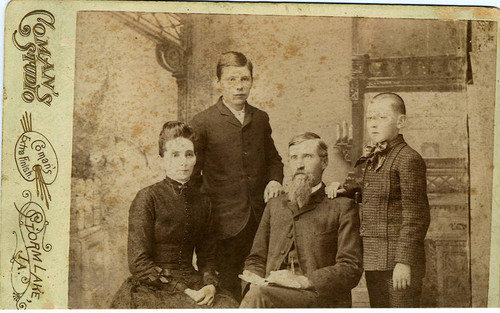
- The Weddington family in 1899. Wilson Weddington is seated in the center.
- Born: 1847
- Died: June 21, 1923 (aged 75–76)
- Resting place: Hollywood Forever Cemetery
- Occupations: Postmaster, small business owner
- Known for: considered "the founder of North Hollywood"
- Spouse: Mary Weddington
- Children: Guy and Fred Weddington
- Relatives: Mollie (sister); Marjorie Davis (daughter-in-law); Guy Weddington-McCreary (great-grandson)

Wilson Weddington (1847 — June 21, 1923) was an American postmaster, businessman, and landowner. He is considered the founder of North Hollywood.

== Life ==
=== Early life ===
Wilson was born in 1847. He fought in the US Civil War.

=== Los Angeles ===
Wilson's sister Mollie moved to Los Angeles in 1886. Wilson, who was living in Storm Lake, Iowa at the time, visited her in 1890, never left, and brought his family soon after. Wilson and his wife bought 22 acres (8.9 ha) of land on what today is the North Hollywood Business District. Legend had it the family also shipped their house in Iowa piece-by-piece to the area. The house was re-constructed in 1891, at which point it became the first house in the San Fernando Valley's southeastern corner. The house was located where El Portal Theater is now.

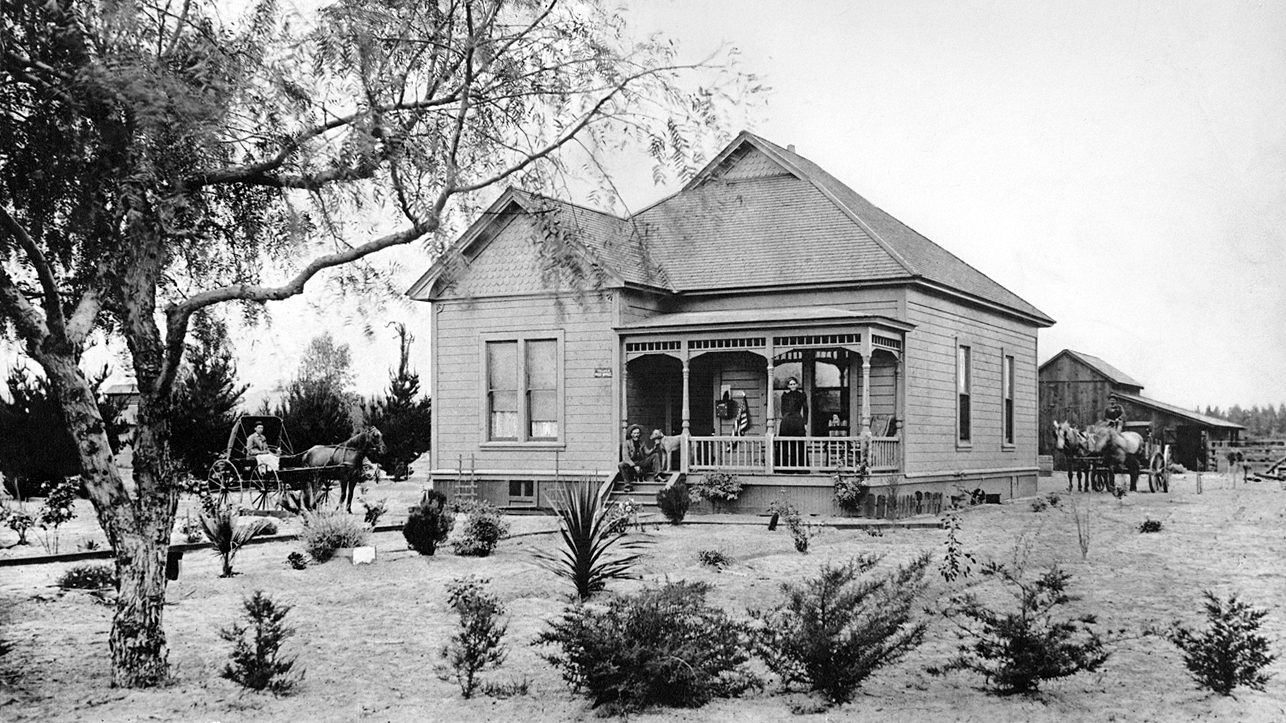
The Weddington family's home in 1894

In 1892 or 1893, Wilson was appointed postmaster and constable for the area. In 1894, the Weddingtons bought a general store and then moved it and the post office into their home. Wilson's entire family worked at the store.

The area around the Weddington's land was sparsely populated during their early years, but by the 1900s, the population had grown and required additional services, which the Weddington's provided. In 1910, the Weddington's opened Bank of Lankershim in the area, and in 1911, Wilson drove the ceremonial spike into the Red Car Trolley rail line that had expanded to the area.

Additionally, in 1904, the Weddingtons moved into a new home located a short distance from their old one.

=== Later life and death ===
Wilson stepped down from his postmaster position in 1915 and died on June 21, 1923. He, along with the rest of his family, was buried at Hollywood Forever Cemetery, and after his death, the local business district closed for two hours to honor him.

== Legacy ==
In 1910, 6th Street, which traveled through the Weddington's original property, was renamed Weddington Street in honor of Wilson and his family. Additionally, in 2015, the intersection of Weddington and Lankershim was named Guy Weddington-McCreary Square in honor of Wilson's great-grandson. Amongst other accomplishments, Guy Weddington-McCreary led the campaign to have Weddington House declared a Los Angeles Historic Cultural Monument.

Additional references to the family in and around the area they used to live include: the sports club Weddington Golf & Tennis, North and South Weddington Park, and numerous apartment complexes.

== See also ==
- List of people from Los Angeles
