= The Iliad Bookshop =

Independent Bookstore in Los Angeles, California

- Industry: Specialty retail
- Number of locations: 1 store
- Area served: Greater Los Angeles
- Owner: Dan Weinstein
- Website: www.iliadbooks.com

The Iliad Bookshop is an independent used bookstore located on the corner of Chandler and Cahuenga boulevards in North Hollywood, California. One of the largest bookstores in Los Angeles, the store contains more than 100,000 books.

== History ==
The Iliad Bookshop opened in 1987 next to a video store named The Odyssey. Both were named after epic poems by Homer: The Iliad and The Odyssey. Dan Weinstein, founder of The Iliad Bookshop, took inspiration for his business's name from his neighbor, later stating that he couldn't resist the idea of stores with those names doing business side by side. Additionally, at the time of The Iliad Bookstore's opening, several of Weinstein's aunts and uncles owned a total of twelve bookstores throughout southern California. Weinstein worked in those bookstores for ten years before opening his own.

In 2006, Weinstein purchased a building on the corner of Chandler and Cahuenga Boulevard, where he then moved his bookstore. In doing so, the store increased from 3,200 square feet (300 m^{2}) to 5,000 square feet (460 m^{2}).

On November 3, 2022, a pile of free books outside the bookshop was set on fire. The fire was put out before it spread inside, although the bookshop did fill with smoke. The store created a $5,000 GoFundMe to raise money for repairs; within ten days, the project had raised more than $33,000 and was championed by celebrities such as Patton Oswalt. The Los Angeles Fire and Police departments did not investigate the incident for arson.

== Design ==
The exterior of The Iliad Bookshop features a mural by Paul Dilworth and several building-sized book reliefs.

== Store cats ==
Two cats live inside the bookshop. Their names are Apollo and Zeus.

== In popular culture ==
Several movies and television shows have filmed at The Iliad Bookshop, including S.W.A.T., American Horror Story, Jane the Virgin, Lethal Weapon 3, and more. The bookshop was also featured in Close Enough and a New Yorker Magazine photoshoot with Paul Giamatti.
