= Outpost Building =

Building in Los Angeles, California, U.S.

- U.S. Historic district – Contributing property
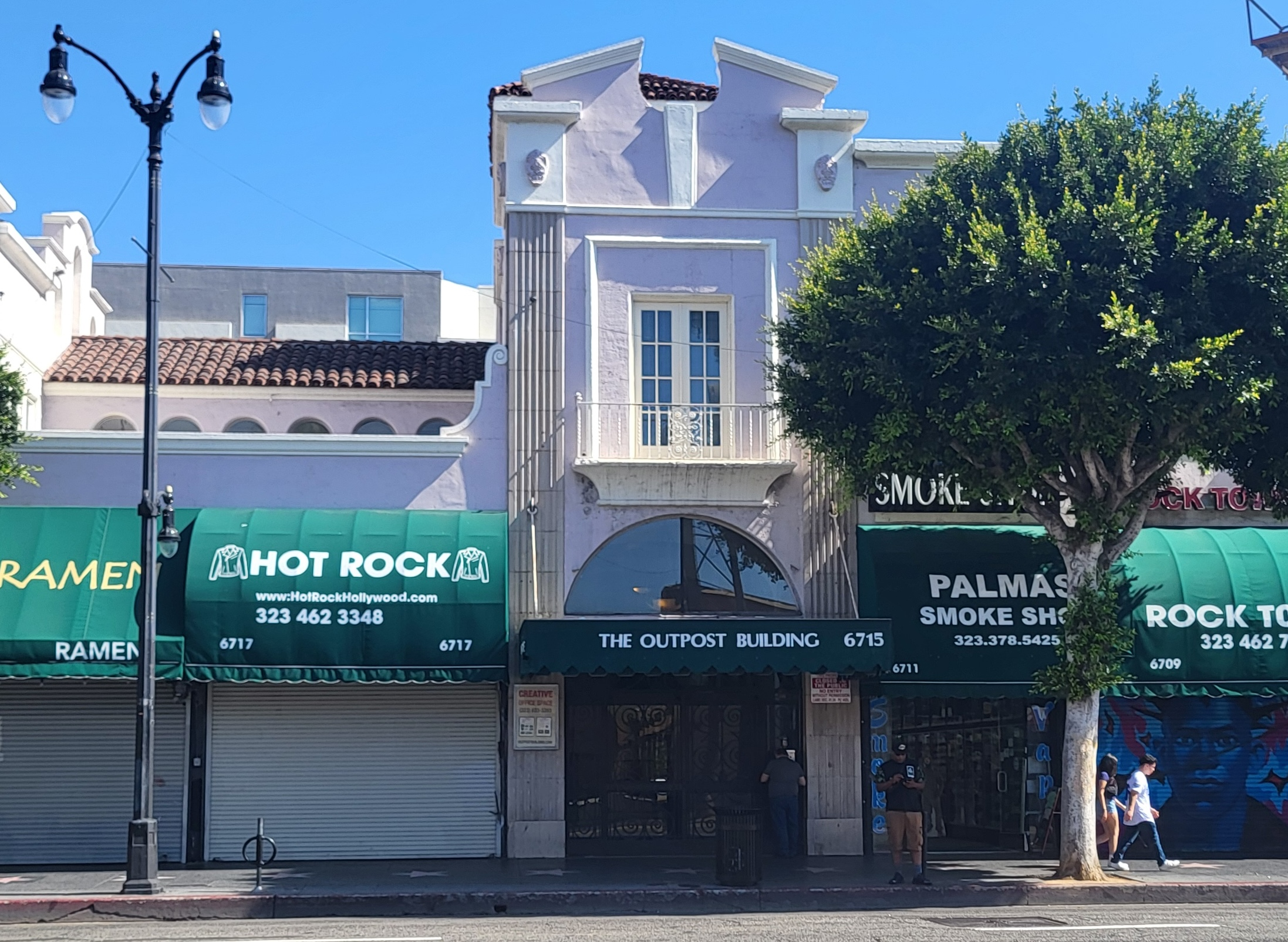
- The building in 2024

- Location within the Los Angeles metropolitan area
- Location: 6701-6723 W. Hollywood Blvd., Hollywood, California
- Coordinates: 34.1018°N 118.3363°W
- Built: 1920 or 1927
- Architect: E. Parcher and/or B. B. Horner
- Architectural style: Spanish Colonial Revival French Regency combination
- Part of: Hollywood Boulevard Commercial and Entertainment District (ID85000704)
- Designated CP: April 4, 1985

Outpost Building is a historic office building complex at 6701-6723 W. Hollywood Boulevard in Hollywood, California.

== History ==
Outpost Building was built for Mr. and Mrs. B. C. Donnelly by E. Parcher and/or B. B. Horner. The building was completed either in 1920 or 1927.

In 1985, the Hollywood Boulevard Commercial and Entertainment District was added to the National Register of Historic Places, with Outpost Building listed as a contributing property in the district.

== Architecture and design ==
Outpost Building consists of two two-story buildings originally separated by a courtyard, then joined by a second story arcaded passage. The building features two competing architectural styles: Spanish Colonial Revival and French Regency. Elements of Spanish Colonial Revival include a red tiled roof, bell tower, arched windows, and wrought iron balconies, while the building's French Regency elements include a swan-necked pediment and stone medallions.

The building's first floor interior originally contained studio shops, mezzanine balconies, and 19-foot ceilings, all of which were modeled to resemble shops in Madrid, Spain. The lobby also contained Art Deco lamps, terrazzo flooring, and a red tile stairway with a wrought-iron handrail.

== Filming location ==
In Garry Marshall's Pretty Woman, the alleyway where a prostitute's dead body was found was filmed in the Outpost Building's lobby. Dear God, also directed by Marshall, filmed in this location as well, as did the sexploitation film Angel.

== See also ==
- List of contributing properties in the Hollywood Boulevard Commercial and Entertainment District
