= Chaplin-Keaton-Lloyd Alley =

Alley in Hollywood, Los Angeles, California, United States

Coordinates: 34.1012°N 118.3294°W

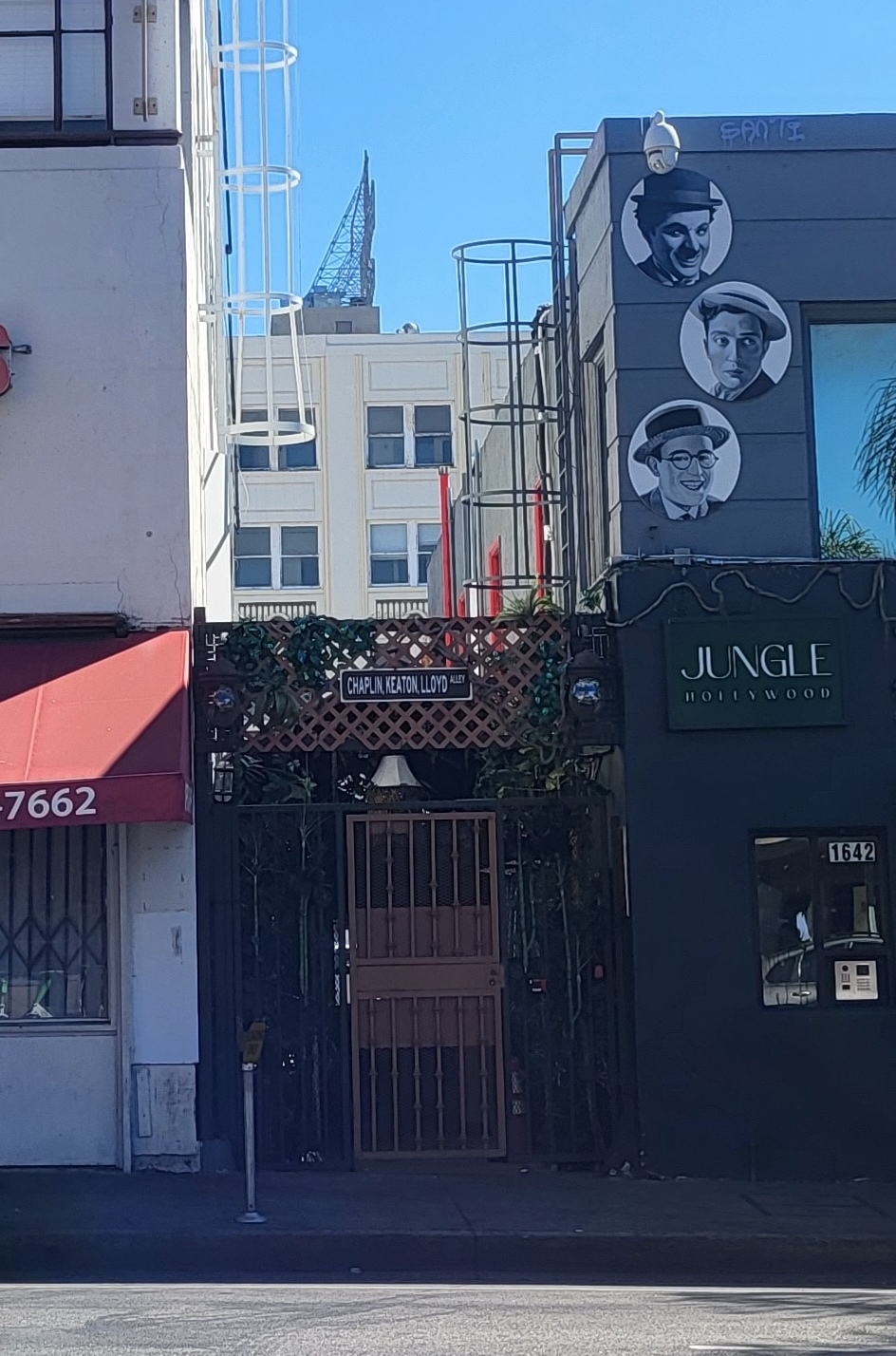
The alley in 2026

Chaplin-Keaton-Lloyd Alley, previously unofficially known as Hall's Alley, is a one-block alley that connects with Cahuenga Boulevard near Hollywood Boulevard in Hollywood, Los Angeles, California. It is notable as a filming location for at least 24 silent films.

== Description ==
Chaplin-Keaton-Lloyd Alley is a one-block, 217 feet (66 m) east-west alley that travels between Cahuenga Boulevard and Cosmos Street, just south of Hollywood Boulevard, in Hollywood, Los Angeles, California. The alley's western entrance is next to 1602 Cahuenga Boulevard.

== History ==
The alley that would become Chaplin-Keaton-Lloyd Alley has existed since at least 1919. Officially it was unnamed; however, studio notes from the filming of The Kid list it as Hall's Alley, presumably named after Hall’s Grocery, which backed onto it.

The alley was a popular shoot location during the silent era due to its lighting, gritty feel, and proximity to Hollywood's filmmaking center. At least 24 silent films are known to have shot here, from filmmakers and actors such as Charlie Chaplin, Grace Cunard, Douglas Fairbanks, Oliver Hardy, Harry Houdini, Buster Keaton, Harold Lloyd, Cleo Madison, and Lois Weber.

The alley was made part of a pedestrian mall in 1960.

Film historian John Bengtson led an initiative to name the alley after its silent film history as early as 2020, and on September 29, 2021, the first ever National Silent Film Day, the alley was named Chaplin-Keaton-Lloyd Alley, after Charlie Chaplin, Buster Keaton, and Harold Lloyd, whose films The Kid (1921), Cops (1922), and Safety Last! (1923) all filmed here. The dedication, which in addition to Bengtson was attended by City Councilman Mitch O'Farrell, Hollywood Heritage president Brian Curran, Chaplin’s granddaughter Kiera, Keaton’s great granddaughter Keaton Talmadge, Lloyd’s granddaughter Suzanne, Jackie Coogan’s grandson Keith, and Chaplin’s primary cameraman's grandson David Totheroh, was part of a larger plan to develop and restore the neighborhood. At the time, the alley housed outdoor dining for a local restaurant.

=== Films filmed here ===
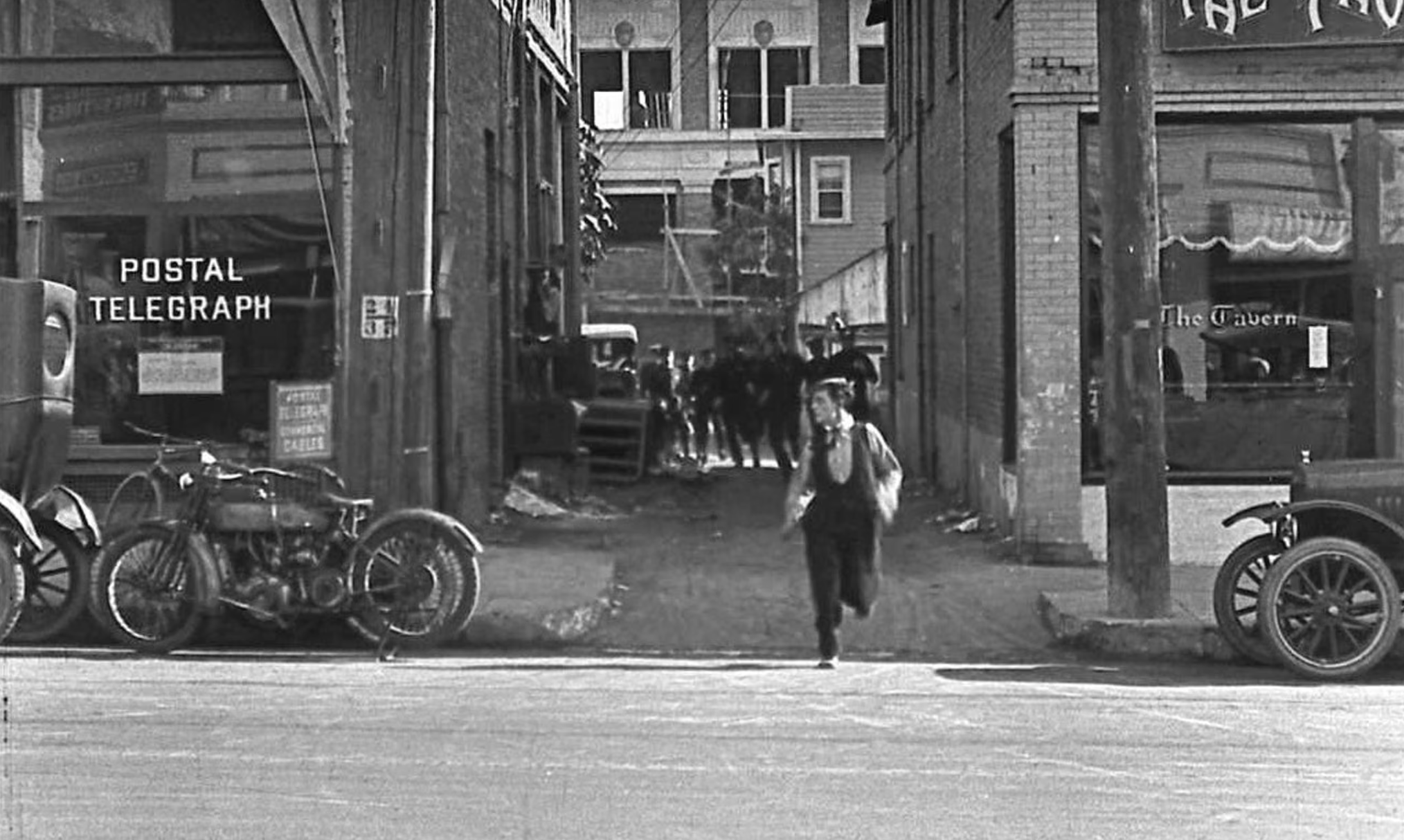
Still from Buster Keaton's Cops featuing Chaplin-Keaton-Lloyd Alley

Silent films known to have filmed in Chaplin-Keaton-Lloyd Alley include:

- Eleanor’s Catch (1916)
- Where Are My Children? (1916)
- Hubby's Night Out (1917)
- The Purple Mask (1917)
- The Detectress (1919)
- The Grim Game (1919)
- Her Bridal Nightmare (1919)
- Don't Be Foolish (1920)
- Neighbors (1920)
- The Kid (1921)
- Cops (1922)
- Safety Last! (1923)
- The Last Edition (1925)

Other films that feature the alley include:

- Ed Wood (1994)
