= Creque Building =

Building in Los Angeles, California, U.S.

- U.S. Historic district – Contributing property
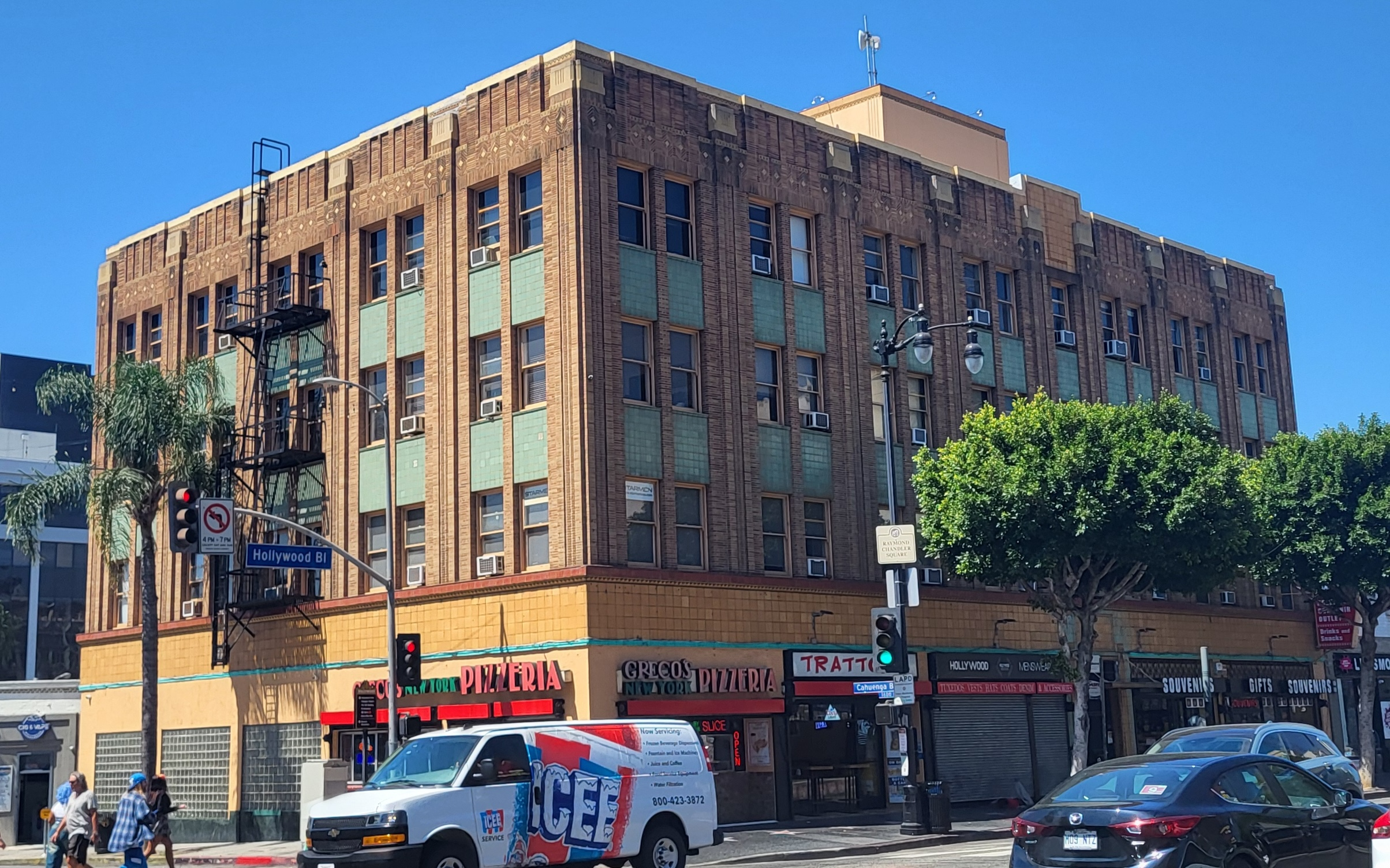
- The building in 2024

- Location within the Los Angeles metropolitan area
- Location: 6400 W. Hollywood Blvd., Hollywood, California
- Coordinates: 34.1015°N 118.3299°W
- Built: 1910–1911 or 1913, 1931 or 1934
- Architect: E. Fossler, B. B. Homer
- Architectural style: Art Deco
- Part of: Hollywood Boulevard Commercial and Entertainment District (ID85000704)
- Designated CP: April 4, 1985

Creque Building, also known as Hollywood Building, is a historic office building at 6400 W. Hollywood Boulevard, on the corner of Hollywood and Cahuenga Boulevard, in Hollywood, California.

== History ==
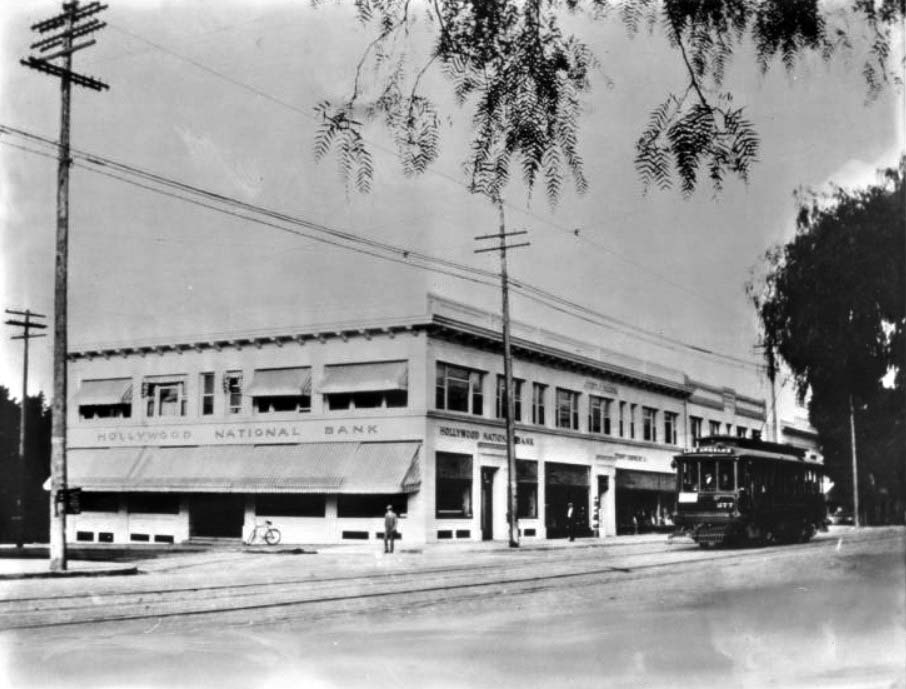
Creque Building in the 1910s

Creque Building was originally designed by E. Fossler for J. P. Creque, either in 1910–1911 or 1913. Two-stories in height, the building was built on the site of the former Sackett Hotel and cost $30,000 ($1 million in 2025) to construct. Its primary tenant was Hollywood National Bank.

In 1931 or 1934, architect B. B. Horner enlarged the building to four stories and added an Art Deco facade.

In 1985, the Hollywood Boulevard Commercial and Entertainment District was added to the National Register of Historic Places, with Creque Building listed as a contributing property in the district. The building's patterned brick and Art Deco facade were specifically mentioned as contributing to the historic nature of the district.

== Architecture and design ==
Creque Building features an art deco design and is made of brick, with green and gold tile patterns highlighting the brick pattern. A series of brick piers with slightly recessed and symmetrical placed sash windows create the vertical effect art deco buildings are known for, and the entryway and lobby feature colorful glazed tile.

== See also ==
- List of contributing properties in the Hollywood Boulevard Commercial and Entertainment District
