= Halifax Hotel =

American Hotel

The Halifax Apartment Hotel was a hotel, which is now apartments at the intersection of Cahuenga Boulevard with Yucca Street, just off of Hollywood Boulevard in Hollywood, Los Angeles, California. In 1954 it had a reported 200 rooms.
