= Cahuenga Boulevard =

Boulevard of northern Los Angeles

Coordinates: 34°6′6″N 118°19′46″W

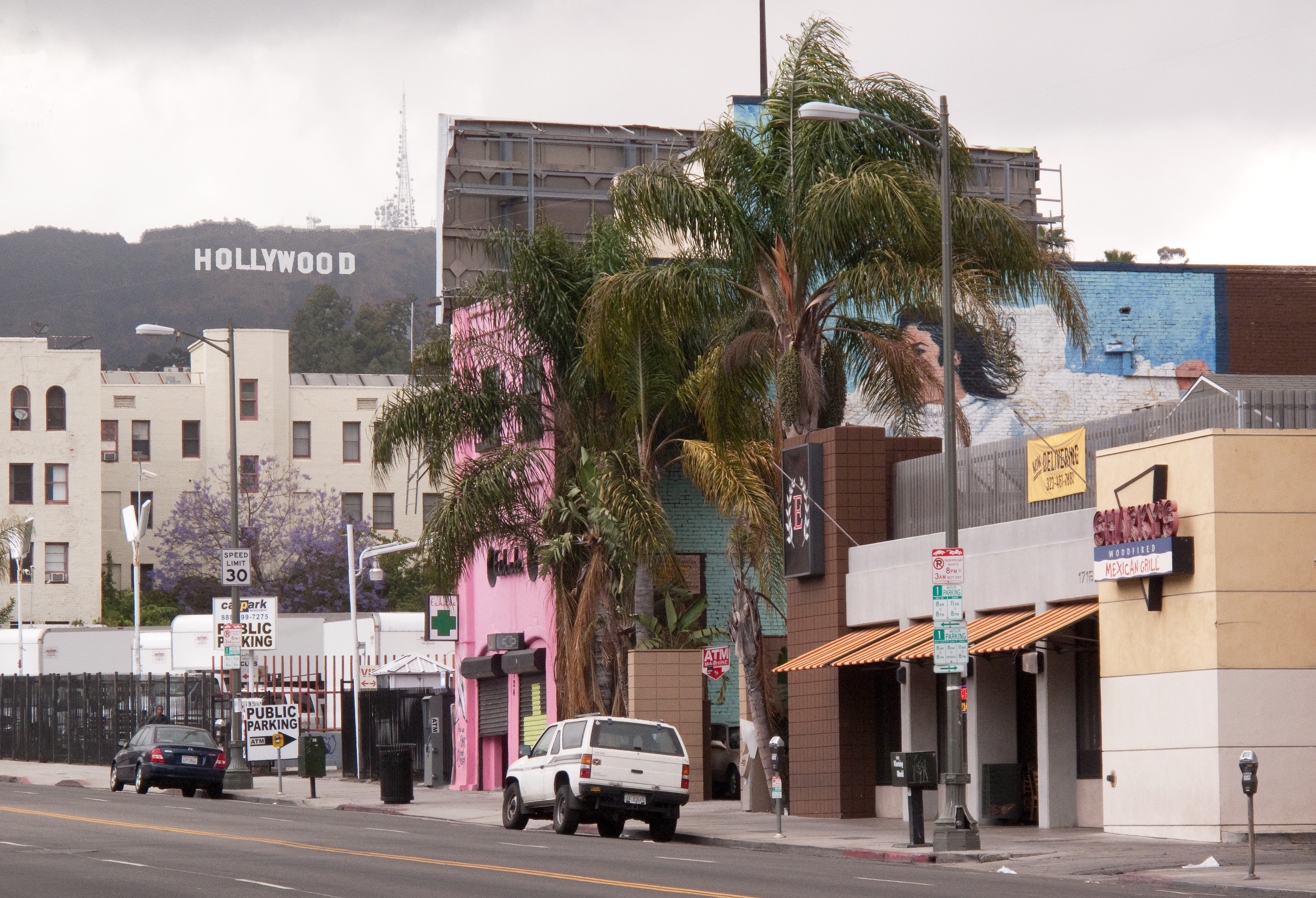
- Cahuenga Boulevard in Hollywood
- Interactive map of Cahuenga Boulevard
- Type: Street
- Maintained by: Bureau of Street Services, City of L.A. DPW
- Length: 8 mi (13 km)
- Location: Los Angeles, California
- Nearest metro station: Hollywood/Vine
- South end: Rosewood Avenue in Hollywood
- Major junctions: SR 2 Hollywood Boulevard; US 101; SR 134
- North end: Victory Boulevard in North Hollywood

Cahuenga Boulevard (/kəˈwɛŋɡə/) is a major boulevard in Los Angeles, California, US. It connects the Los Angeles Basin to the San Fernando Valley, with a southern terminus at Rosewood Avenue in Hancock Park. It simultaneously transitions into Ventura Boulevard and intersects with Lankershim Boulevard at the border of Studio City and Universal City. If one follows Lankershim Boulevard, they reconnect to Cahuenga Boulevard and it continues until its northern terminus with Victory Boulevard in North Hollywood.

"Cahuenga" is a Spanish transliteration of the Tongva village of Kawe'ngna, meaning "place of the mountain". The Spanish used the village name Cahuenga to name the 227 m tall pass between two of the Santa Monica Mountains, now called Briar Summit and Burbank Peak. Cahuenga Boulevard is so named because it transverses Cahuenga Pass.

== Name ==
Cahuenga Boulevard was named after the Cahuenga Pass, which connects the San Fernando Valley and Los Angeles. The pass itself was named after the former villagers who lived in the area, who went by either Cabueng-na or Kaweenga.

== Route ==
The majority of the route is bifurcated by the Hollywood Freeway, US-101. Cahuenga Boulevard East travels from Odin Street, near The Ford to Barham Boulevard, where it transitions into W. C. Fields Drive as it approaches Universal City. To reach the rest of Cahuenga Boulevard, travelers must cross the freeway via Pilgrimage Bridge, the Mulholland Drive Viaduct, or the Barham Boulevard Overpass. The western route of Cahuenga Boulevard transitions into Highland Avenue outside of the Hollywood Bowl.

Cahuenga Boulevard emerges again at an intersection where Lankershim Boulevard crosses the Los Angeles River. This section of Cahuenga Boulevard is a north-south route that passes under the Ventura Freeway and travels through the east side of the valley until terminating with Victory Boulevard at the southern entrance to Valhalla Memorial Park Cemetery.

Cahuenga Boulevard passes through many neighborhoods. South of Cahuenga Pass, the boulevard passes through Hollywood, Whitley Heights, the Hollywood Hills, and the Hollywood Dell. It connects to Studio City and Universal City in the San Fernando Valley. The section north of the Los Angeles River passes through the neighborhoods of Toluca Lake and North Hollywood.

== Landmarks ==
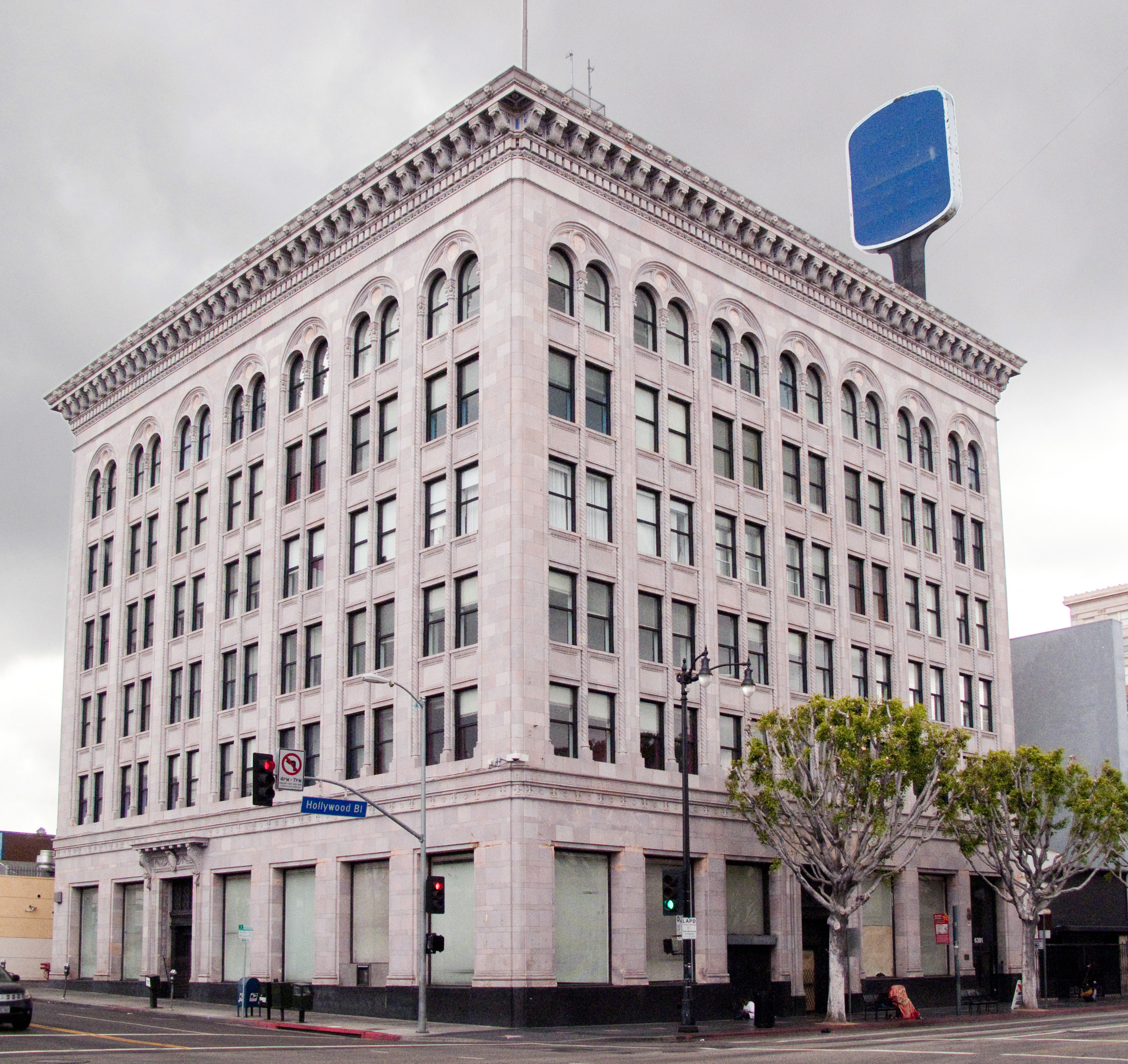
Security Trust and Savings

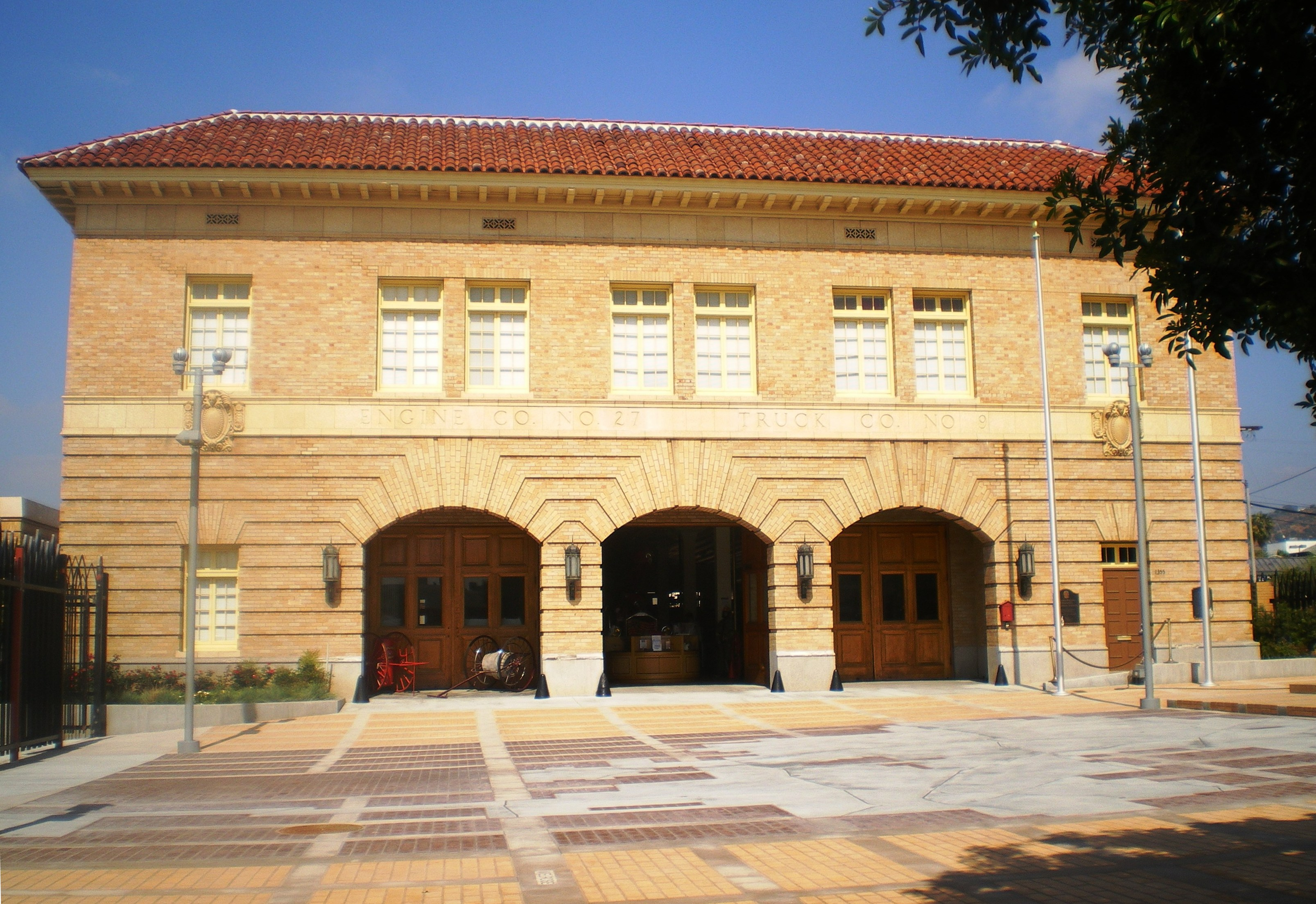
Los Angeles Fire Department Museum

The southern portion of Cahuenga Boulevard has been referred to as the "heart of old Hollywood". The intersection between Cahuenga and Hollywood Boulevard has been an important intersection from the early history of Los Angeles; by 1915 it had a trolley stop, a bank and a hardware store. Trolley cars were used on the boulevards until the 1960s when they were replaced with busses. Historically a number of important Los Angeles buildings were located on the street, including the Technicolor building from the 1940s through the 1960s and the World Book and News building.

Julian Medical Building on the south-east corner of Cahuenga and Hollywood is considered "an architectural masterpiece" and "one of the crowning achievements of Streamline Moderne." Security Trust and Savings on the north-east corner was an important financial institution for early Hollywood and Creque Building on the south-west corner is notable as well. Chaplin-Keaton-Lloyd Alley, a popular film location in the 1920s, is located just south of the Hollywood and Cahuenga as well.

The Halifax Hotel, owned by Van Cliburn at Cahuenga and Yucca Street. Numerous nightclubs, bars, and restaurants line Cahuenga between Sunset Boulevard and Franklin Avenue. Notable clubs in this area include: The Room, Hotel Café, and Velvet Margarita.

The Los Angeles Fire Department Museum and Memorial, listed as a Los Angeles Historic-Cultural Monument (LAHCM) and on the National Register of Historic Places, is located at 1355 North Cahuenga Boulevard. Other LAHCMs on Cahuenga include the Hollywood Walk of Fame, Raymond Chandler Square, Hollywood Pilgrimage Memorial Monument, and Studio Theatre at the Denis Building.

Other landmarks on or abutting the southern portion of Cahuenga include Los Angeles Tennis Club, John Anson Ford Amphitheatre, and the Hollywood Recreation Center.

The Iliad Bookshop, The Baked Potato, Valhalla Memorial Park Cemetery, and Theatre of NOTE are all located on the northern portion of Cahuenga Boulevard in the San Fernando Valley. Universal Studios Hollywood has an entrance from Cahuenga as well.

== Film location ==
Cahuenga Boulevard has appeared in several of his films. 1542 Cahuenga Boulevard, which formerly adjoined the Toribuchi Grocery at 1546, appeared in the 1921 Keaton film The Goat, which featured Keaton running from the police past them. It is now a strip mall. In another Keaton film, Three Ages (1923), Keaton is seen running from the police past the Los Angeles Police Department Hollywood building and former fire station, now the location of Edmonds Tower at 1629.
