= North Hollywood, Los Angeles =

North Hollywood
- Neighborhood
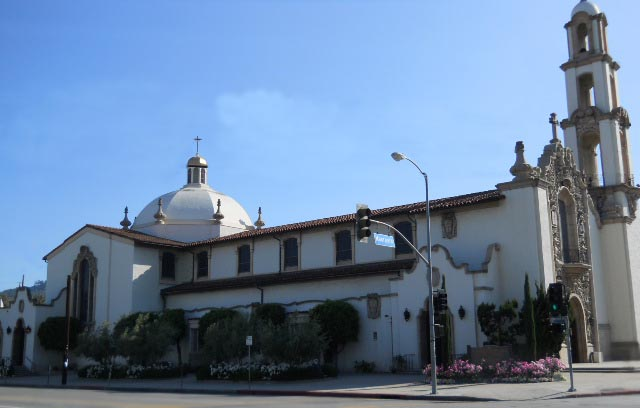
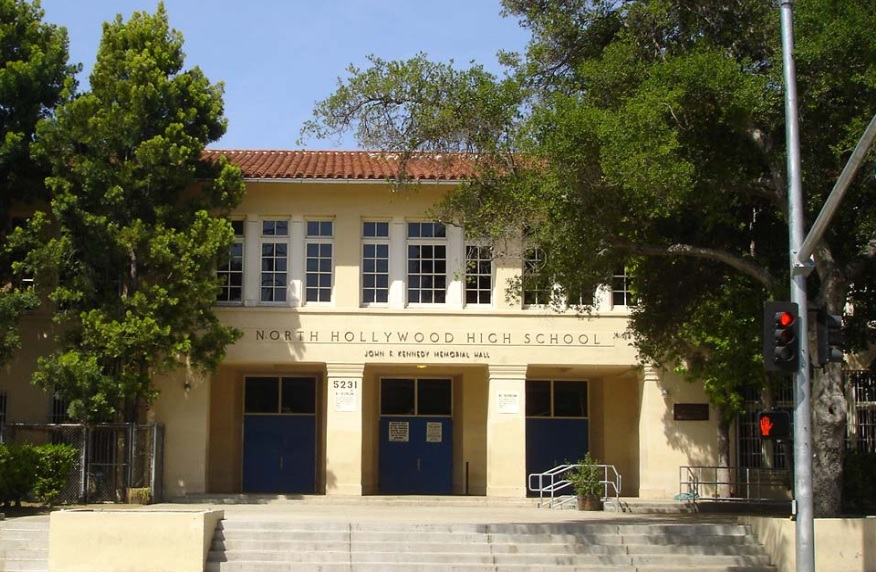
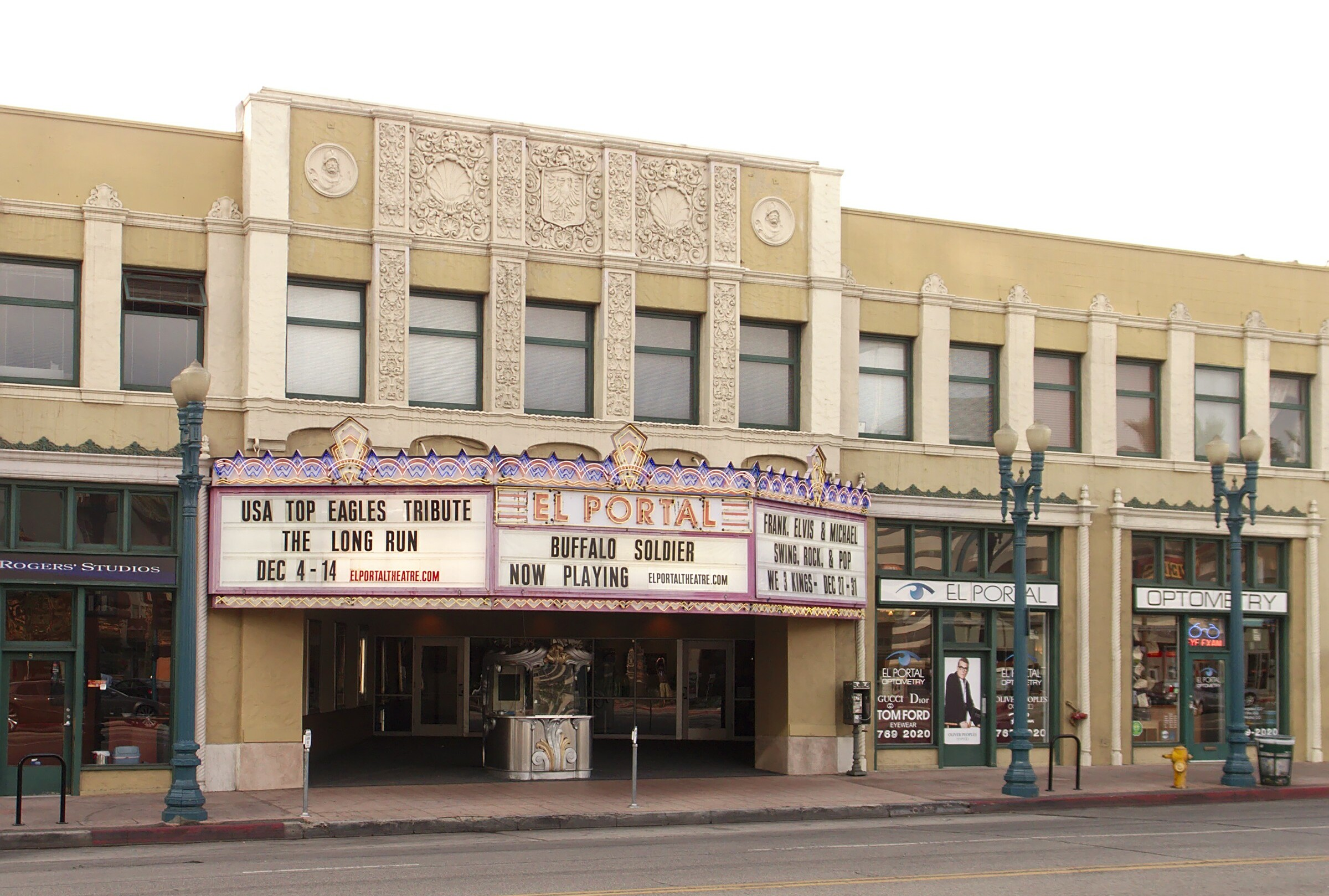
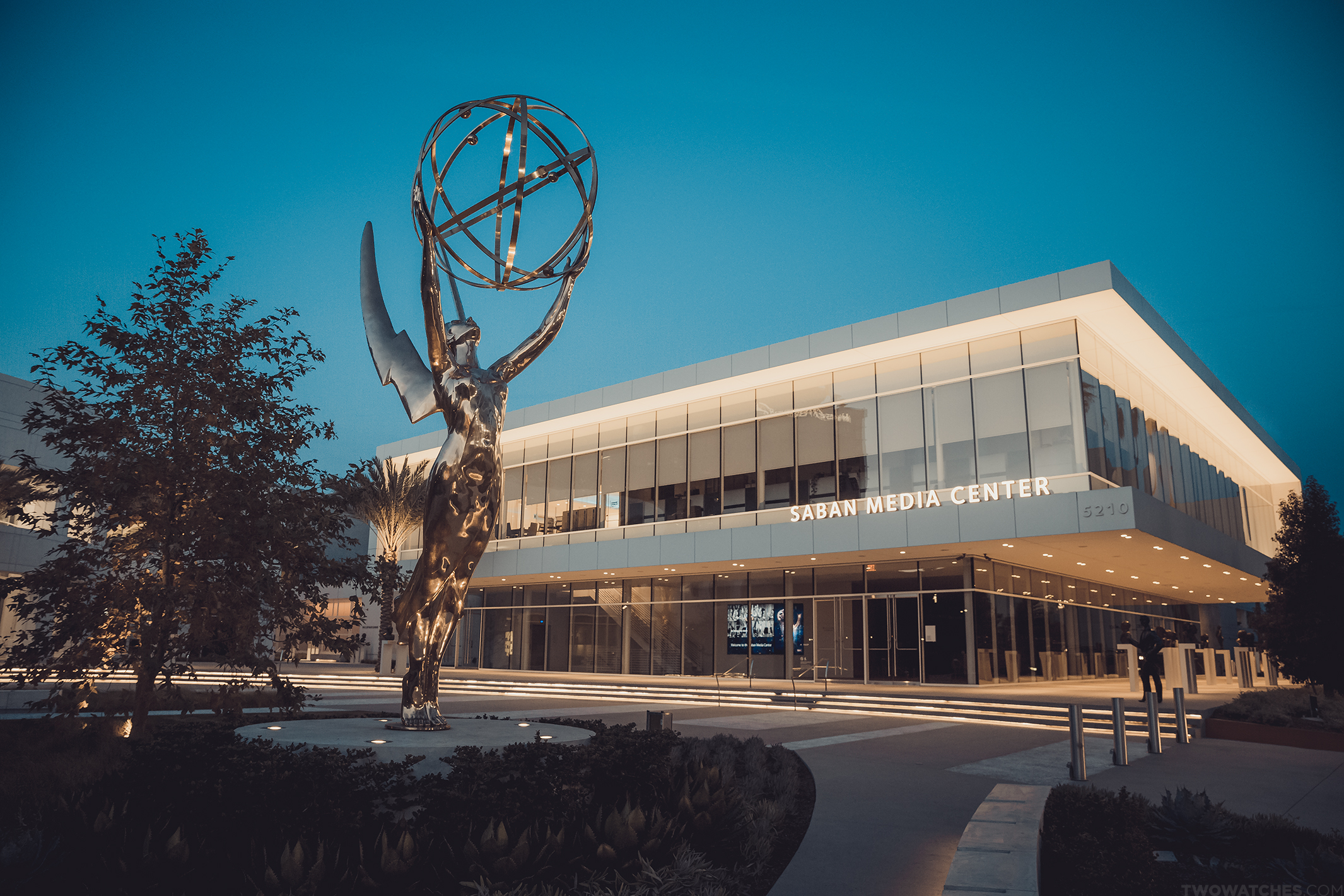
- Top: St. Charles Borromeo Church (left), North Hollywood High School (right); bottom: El Portal Theater (left), Academy of Television Arts & Sciences (right).
- Nickname: NoHo
- Location within Los Angeles/San Fernando Valley North Hollywood (the Los Angeles metropolitan area)
- Coordinates: 34°10′26″N 118°22′44″W
- Country: United States
- State: California
- County: Los Angeles
- City: Los Angeles
- Named for: Location north of Hollywood

Population (2024)
  - Total: 64,587

North Hollywood (NoHo) is a neighborhood and district in the San Fernando Valley of Los Angeles, California. The neighborhood contains the NoHo Arts District, El Portal Theater, several art galleries, and the Academy of Television Arts & Sciences. The North Hollywood Metro Rail station is the northern terminus of the B Line subway on the Los Angeles Metro.

North Hollywood was established by the Lankershim Ranch Land and Water Company in 1887. It was first named "Toluca" before being renamed "Lankershim" in 1896 and finally "North Hollywood" in 1927.

== History ==
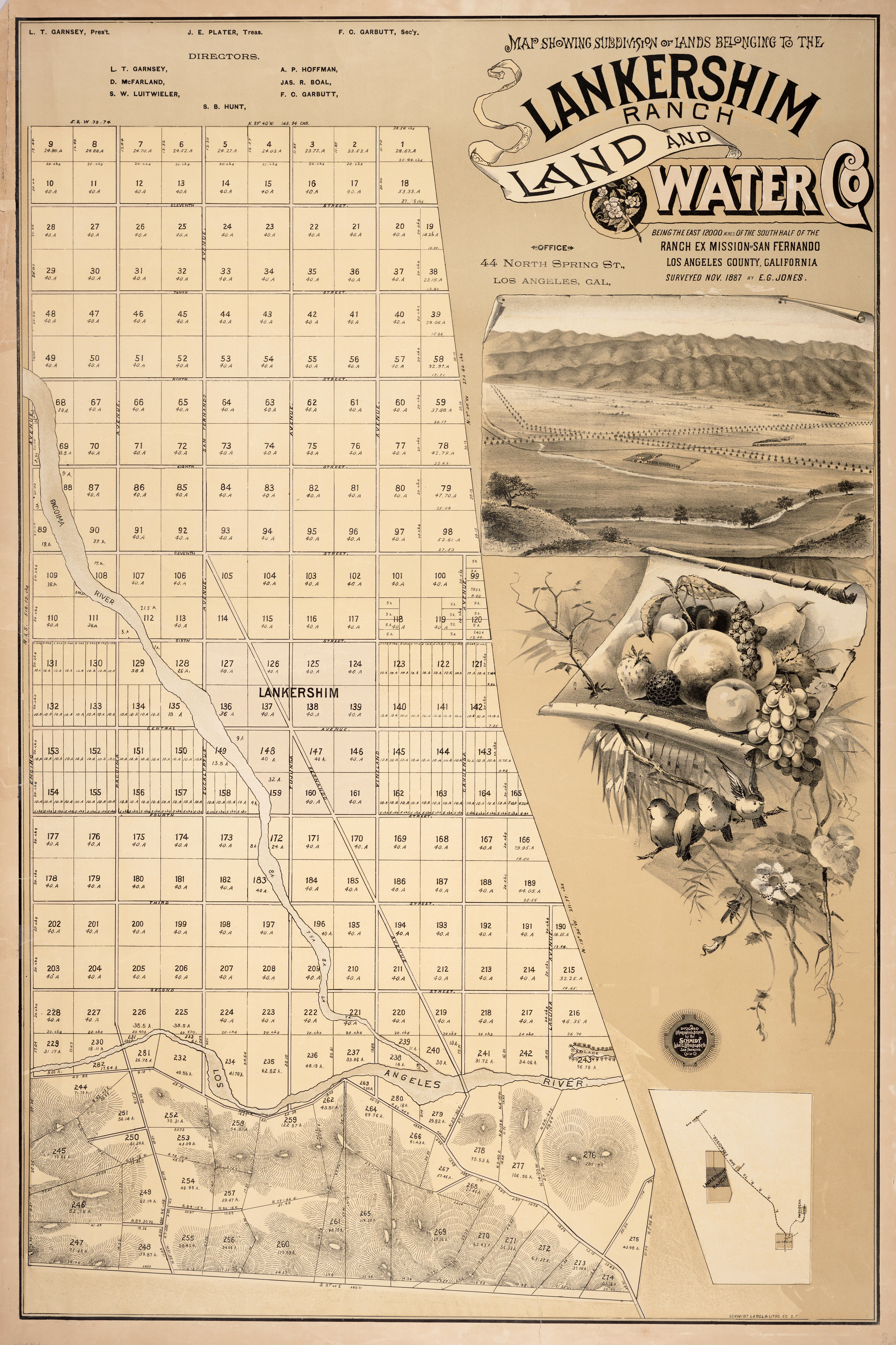
Lankershim Ranch Land and Water Company, 1887

=== Before annexation ===
North Hollywood was once part of the vast landholdings of the Mission San Fernando Rey de España, which was confiscated by the government during the Mexican period of rule.

A group of investors assembled as the San Fernando Farm Homestead Association purchased the southern half of the Rancho Ex-Mission San Fernando. The leading investor was Isaac Lankershim, a Northern California stockman and grain farmer, who was impressed by the Valley's wild oats and proposed to raise sheep on the property. In 1873, Isaac Lankershim's son and future son-in-law, James Boon Lankershim and Isaac Newton Van Nuys, moved to the San Fernando Valley and took over management of the property. Van Nuys thought the property could profitably grow wheat using the dryland farming technique developed on the Great Plains and leased land from the Association to test his theories. In time, the Lankershim property, under its third name, the Los Angeles Farming and Milling Company, would become the world's largest wheat-growing empire.

In October 1887, J.B. Lankershim and eight other developers organized the Lankershim Ranch Land and Water Company, purchasing 12,000 acres (49 km^{2}) north of the Cahuenga Pass from the Lankershim Farming and Milling Company. Lankershim established a townsite which the residents named Toluca along the old road from Cahuenga Pass to San Fernando. On April 1, 1888, they offered ready-made small farms for sale, already planted with deep-rooted deciduous fruit and nut trees—mostly peaches, pears, apricots, and walnuts—that could survive the rainless summers of the Valley by relying on the high water table along the Tujunga Wash rather than surface irrigation.

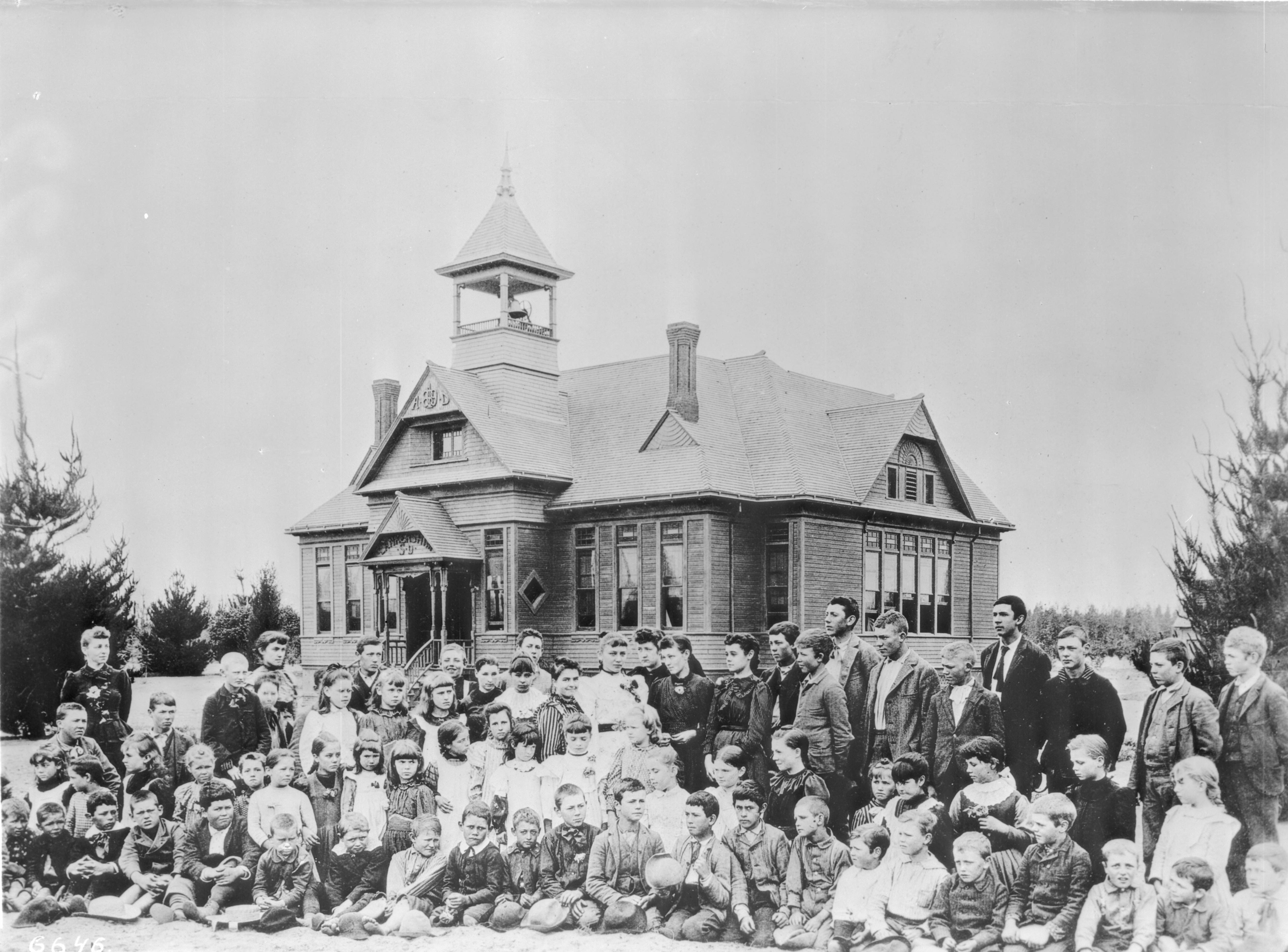
Lankershim School was the first school founded in the San Fernando Valley.

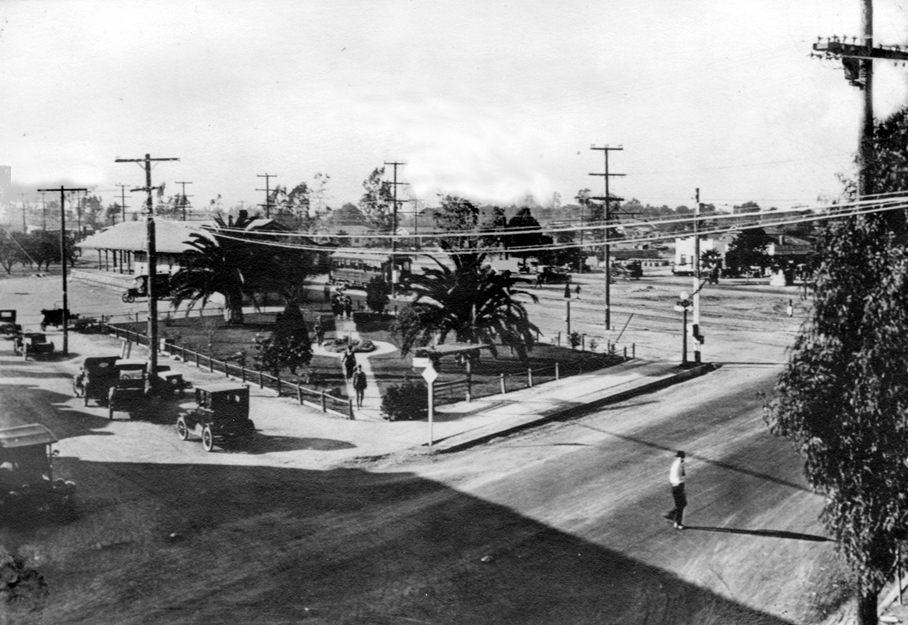
North Hollywood Pacific Electric Car Station, 1919

The land boom of the 1880s went bust by the 1890s, but despite another brutal drought cycle in the late 1890s, the fruit and nut farmers remained solvent. The Toluca Fruit Growers Association was formed in 1894. The next year the Southern Pacific opened a branch line slanting northwest across the Valley to Chatsworth. The Chatsworth Limited made one freight stop a day at Toluca, though the depot bore the new name of Lankershim. With the post office across the street being called Toluca, controversy over the town's name continued, and the local ranchers used to quip, "Ship the merchandise to Lankershim, but bill it to Toluca." In 1896, under pressure from Lankershim, the post office at Toluca was renamed "Lankershim" after his father, although the new name of the town would not be officially recognized until 1905.

By 1903, the area was known as "The Home of the Peach". In 1912, the area's major employer, the Bonner Fruit Company, was canning over a million tons of peaches, apricots, and other fruits. When the Los Angeles Aqueduct opened in 1913, Valley farmers offered to buy the surplus water, but the federal legislation that enabled the construction of the aqueduct prohibited Los Angeles from selling the water outside of the city limits.

At first, resistance to the real-estate development and downtown business interests of Los Angeles remained strong enough to keep the small farmers unified in opposition to annexation. However, the fruit packing company interests were taken over by the Los Angeles interests. The two conspired to decrease prices and mitigate the farmers' profit margins, making their continued existence tenuous. When droughts hit the valley again, rather than face foreclosure, the most vulnerable farmers agreed to mortgage their holdings to the fruit packing company and banks in Los Angeles for the immediate future and vote on annexation.

=== Annexation to Los Angeles ===
West Lankershim agreed to be annexed to the City of Los Angeles in 1919. Lankershim proper and non-proper joined in 1923. Much of the promised water delivery was withheld, and many of the ranchers one by one had their holding foreclosed or transferred to the packing companies. In turn, these were bought up by the real-estate developers and by the late 1920s a massive effort was underway to market the area to prospective home owners throughout the country. As part of this effort, in 1927, in an effort to capitalize on the glamour and proximity of Hollywood, Lankershim was renamed "North Hollywood". The result was a massive development of housing which transformed the area into a suburban development of Los Angeles.

=== Retail hub ===
Lankershim Boulevard around Magnolia Boulevard was the heart of the town of Lankershim, and of North Hollywood and until the mid-1950s boasted the largest concentration of retail stores, banks, restaurants, and entertainment. In 1953, for example, the shopping strip included three full-line department stores: J.C. Penney at 5261 Lankershim, Yeakel & Goss department store at 5272, and the upscale single-location Rathbun's department store at nos. 5311 (5307–15), opened in 1921. There were also branches of the large Harris & Frank clothing chain at 5236 Lankershim that opened in 1950, J. J. Newberry five and dime at 5321, and Safeway at 5356.

In the late 1940s and 1950s the area saw the first department-store-anchored, auto-oriented shopping center in the Valley: Valley Plaza, covering both a development at Laurel Canyon at Victory boulevards but also a loose collection of other retail stores south along Laurel Canyon to Oxnard, including a branch of the May Co., the second-largest suburban department store branch in the U.S. at the time. In the mid-1950s Valley Plaza claimed to be the largest shopping center on the West Coast of the United States and the third-largest in the country. It was difficult for the Lankershim retail district to compete and by 1980, most stores had closed including Rathbun's. The May Co. at the south end of the Valley Plaza shopping district built its own attached, enclosed mall, Laurel Plaza, opening in 1968. The last department of Valley Plaza's anchors, Sears, closed in 2019 as department store-anchored shopping centers lost favor. As of 2020, much of the Valley Plaza retail space is either empty, portion is now a middle school, and the Laurel Plaza site is under construction to become the NoHo West mixed-use development, which includes retail.

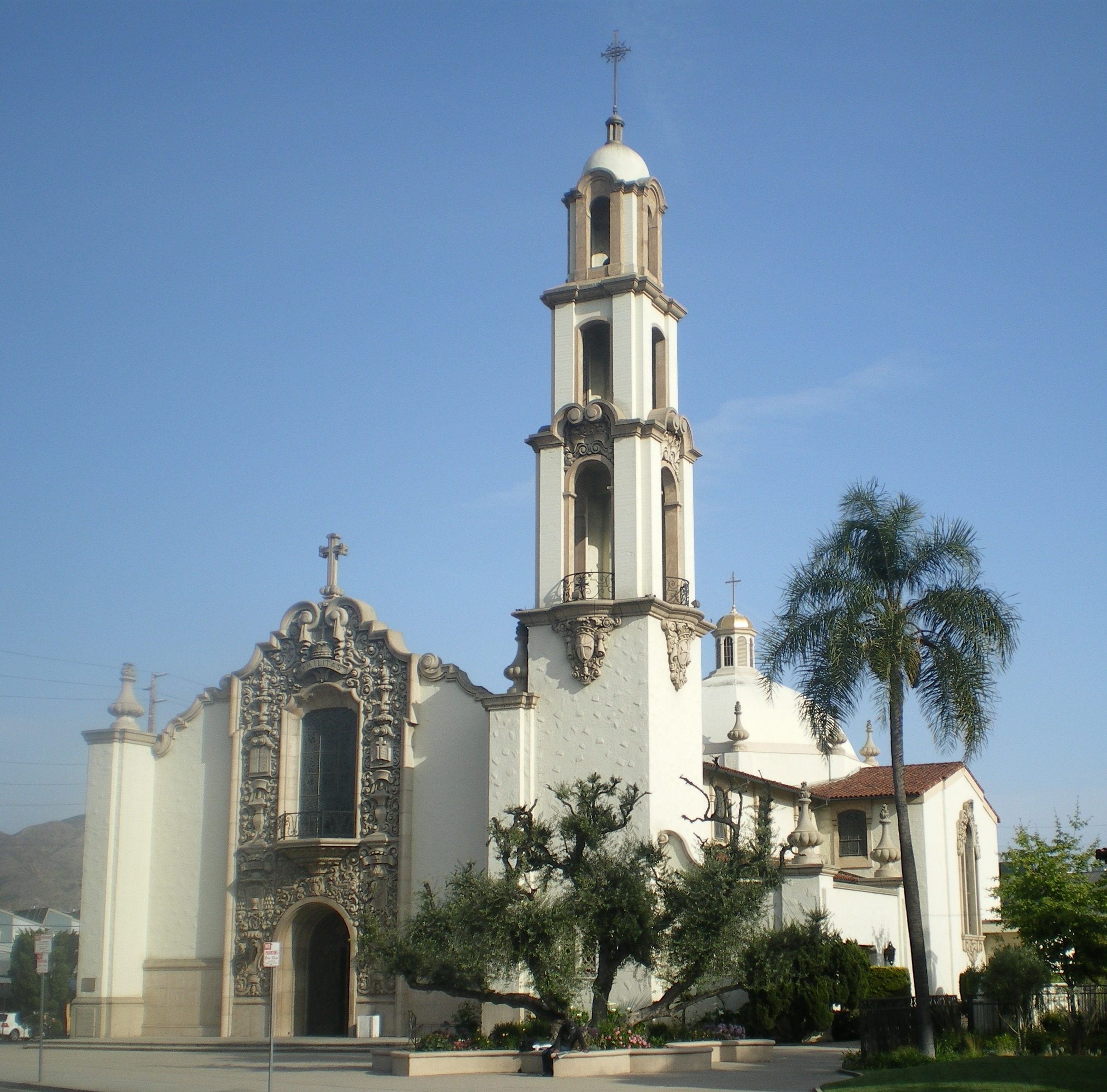
Saint Charles Borromeo Church, built in 1959 in a Spanish Colonial Revival style.

=== 1950s–present ===
By the late 1950s, many of the original owners were aging, and their children were moving to other areas. School integration in the subsequent years, blockbusting, and subsequent ethnic turmoil encouraged many remaining families to move out, who in turn were replaced with black and Hispanic families moving from Central and South Los Angeles. By the 1990s, the demographic changes had almost completely transformed the region.

The North Hollywood shootout occurred in 1997, leaving 12 Los Angeles Police Department officers and eight civilians injured and the two armed robbers dead.

=== 21st century ===
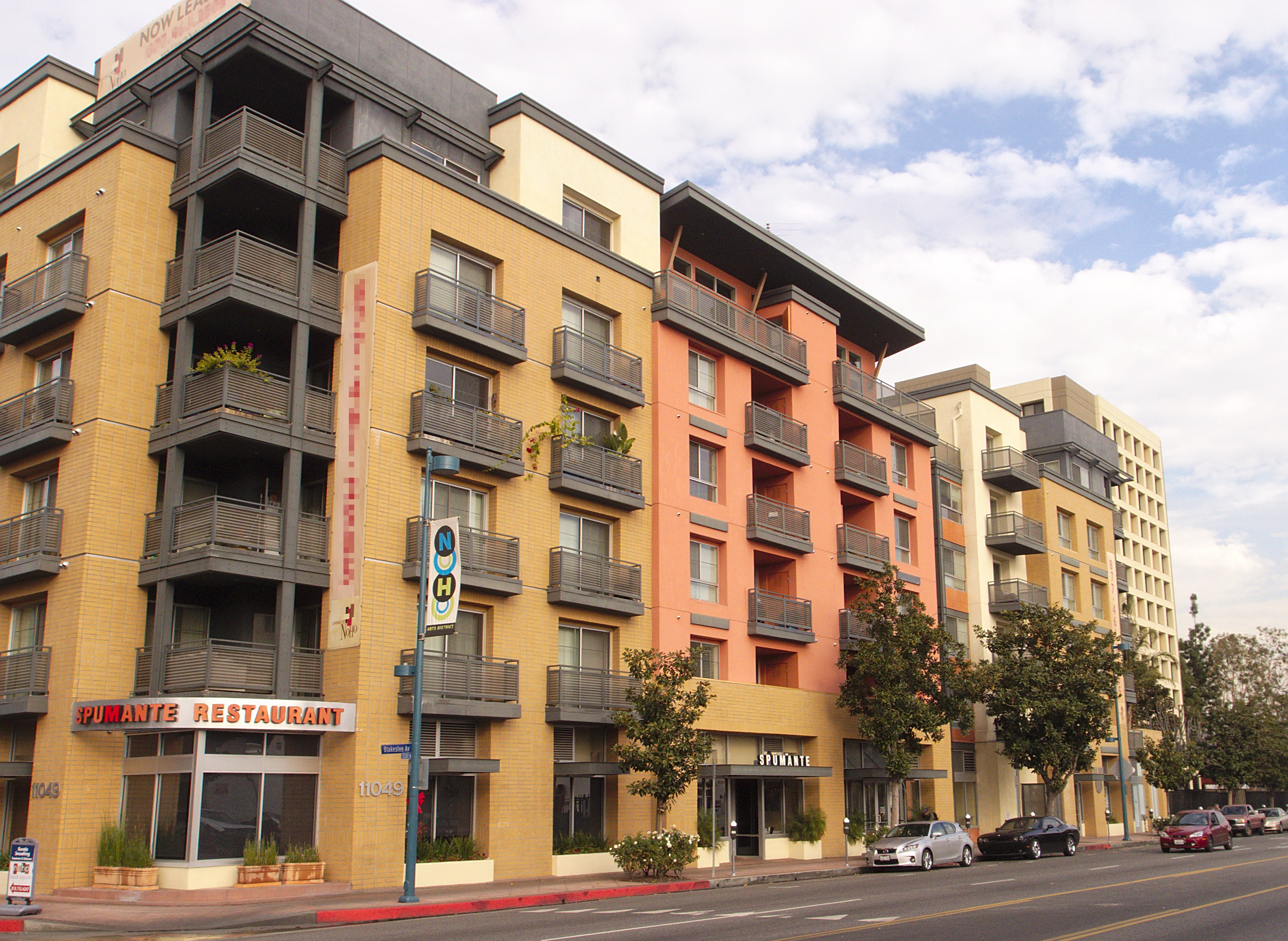
Development in the NoHo Arts District.

The opening of North Hollywood station in 2000, establishment and success of the NoHo Arts District in the old "downtown", and repurposing of disused lots such as Laurel Plaza into NoHo West, has revitalized the heart of North Hollywood.

Since 2000, the community has been developing and undergoing many changes, thanks in large part to the formation of the 743-acre North Hollywood Development District and the subsequent NoHo Commons projects.

In 2015, Lankershim Boulevard in North Hollywood was part of the first San Fernando Valley CicLAvia, an event sponsored by the Los Angeles County Metropolitan Transportation Authority in which major roads are temporarily closed to motorized vehicle traffic and used for recreational human-powered transport.

== Geography ==
North Hollywood is bordered on the north by Sun Valley and on the northeast and east by Burbank. Toluca Lake borders North Hollywood on the southeast and south, and Studio City abuts it on the southwest. It is bordered by Valley Village and Valley Glen on the west.

North Hollywood is not bordered by the neighborhood of Hollywood, as North Hollywood is approximately 6 mi (9.7 km) north of Hollywood.

North Hollywood has a hot summer Mediterranean Climate (Köppen climate classification Csa).

Climate data for North Hollywood, Los Angeles
Month	Jan	Feb	Mar	Apr	May	Jun	Jul	Aug	Sep	Oct	Nov	Dec	Year
Record high °F (°C)	89 (32)	91 (33)	90 (32)	100 (38)	100 (38)	107 (42)	112 (44)	105 (41)	110 (43)	110 (43)	97 (36)	95 (35)	112 (44)
Mean daily maximum °F (°C)	65.1 (18.4)	66.4 (19.1)	69.2 (20.7)	72.9 (22.7)	75.4 (24.1)	79.2 (26.2)	87.6 (30.9)	88.3 (31.3)	87.1 (30.6)	80.3 (26.8)	74.6 (23.7)	68.9 (20.5)	76.2 (24.6)
Mean daily minimum °F (°C)	38.7 (3.7)	40.5 (4.7)	42.8 (6.0)	47.0 (8.3)	50.3 (10.2)	52.8 (11.6)	57.9 (14.4)	56.9 (13.8)	54.9 (12.7)	49.1 (9.5)	40.9 (4.9)	40.6 (4.8)	47.7 (8.7)
Record low °F (°C)	18 (−8)	25 (−4)	29 (−2)	30 (−1)	38 (3)	40 (4)	41 (5)	36 (2)	35 (2)	30 (−1)	25 (−4)	24 (−4)	18 (−8)
Average rainfall inches (mm)	3.47 (88)	3.80 (97)	2.62 (67)	1.18 (30)	0.15 (3.8)	0.01 (0.25)	0.01 (0.25)	0.04 (1.0)	0.30 (7.6)	0.45 (11)	1.32 (34)	2.99 (76)	16.34 (415.9)

== Demographics ==
The 2000 U.S. census counted 77,848 residents in the 5.87-square-mile North Hollywood neighborhood—or 13,264 people per square mile, about an average population density for the city but among the highest for the county. In 2008, the city estimated that the population had increased to 87,241. In 2000, the median age for residents was 30, considered an average age for city and county neighborhoods; the percentage of residents aged 19 to 34 was among the county's highest.

The neighborhood was considered "moderately diverse" ethnically within Los Angeles. The breakdown was 57.7% Latino, 27% Non-Hispanic White, 5.7% Asian, 5.6% black, and 4% from other groups. Foreign-born residents made up 46.4% of residents, a high percentage for Los Angeles; Mexico (43.2%) and El Salvador (16%) were the most common places of birth for this portion of the population. The percentages of never-married men and never-married women were among the county's highest.

The median yearly household income in 2008 dollars was $42,791, considered average for the city but low for the county. The percentages of households that earned $40,000 or less were high for the county. Renters occupied 75.4% of the housing stock, and house- or apartment-owners held 24.6%.

== Attractions ==
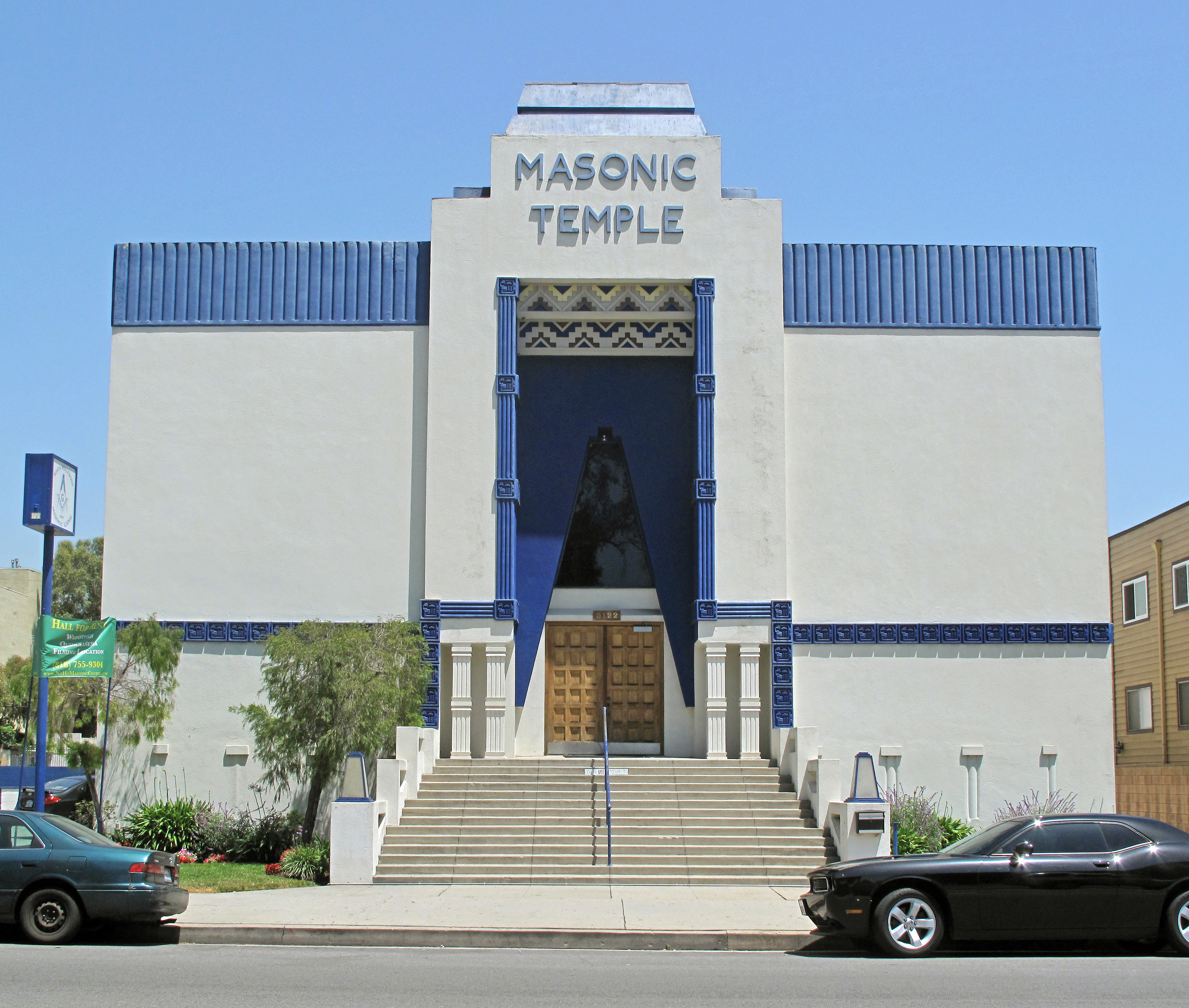
The historic North Hollywood Masonic Temple

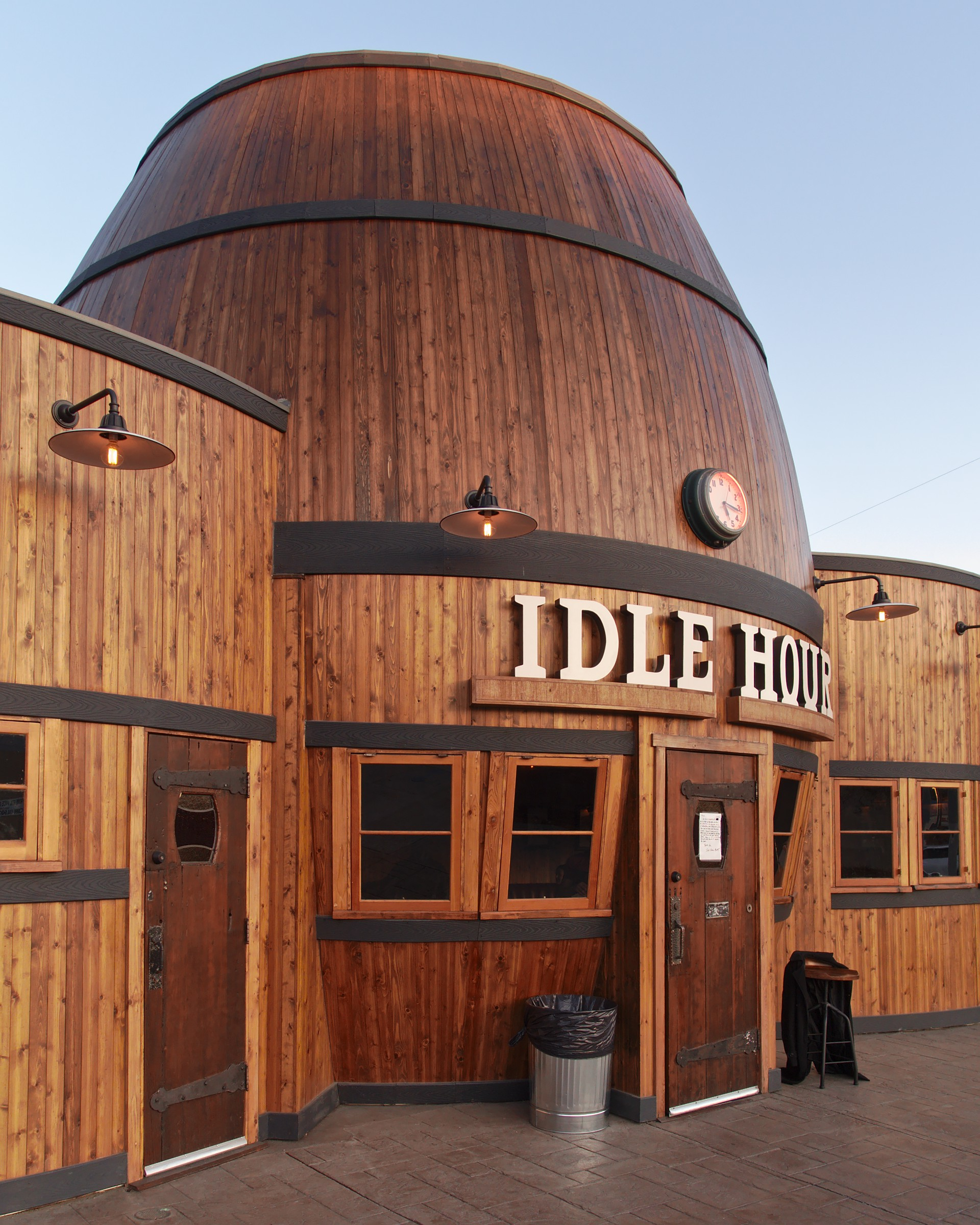
Idle Hour Cafe

- Academy of Television Arts & Sciences
- Amelia Earhart Regional Library
- El Portal Theater
- Idle Hour Cafe
- The Iliad Bookshop
- Lankershim Arts Center
- Lankershim Depot
- North Hollywood Masonic Temple
- Phil's Diner
- St. Charles Borromeo Church
- Valhalla Memorial Park Cemetery and its Portal of the Folded Wings Shrine to Aviation
- Weddington House

== Parks and recreation ==
The North Hollywood Recreation Center is mostly in North Hollywood, with a portion in Valley Village. The park has an auditorium, lighted indoor baseball diamond courts, lighted outdoor baseball diamonds, lighted outdoor basketball courts, a children's play area, lighted handball courts, picnic tables, an outdoor unheated seasonal pool, and lighted tennis courts. In addition the center has an indoor gymnasium which can be used as a second auditorium and a community room; the gymnasium's capacity is 250 people.

The Valley Plaza Recreation Center in North Hollywood includes an auditorium, barbecue pits, a lighted baseball diamond, lighted outdoor basketball courts, a children's play area, a 40-person community room, a lighted American football field, an indoor gymnasium without weights, an outdoor gymnasium without weights, picnic tables, lighted tennis courts, and unlighted volleyball courts. The Jamie Beth Slaven Park, an unstaffed pocket park with unlighted outdoor basketball courts, a children's play area, and picnic tables, is in North Hollywood.

== Education ==
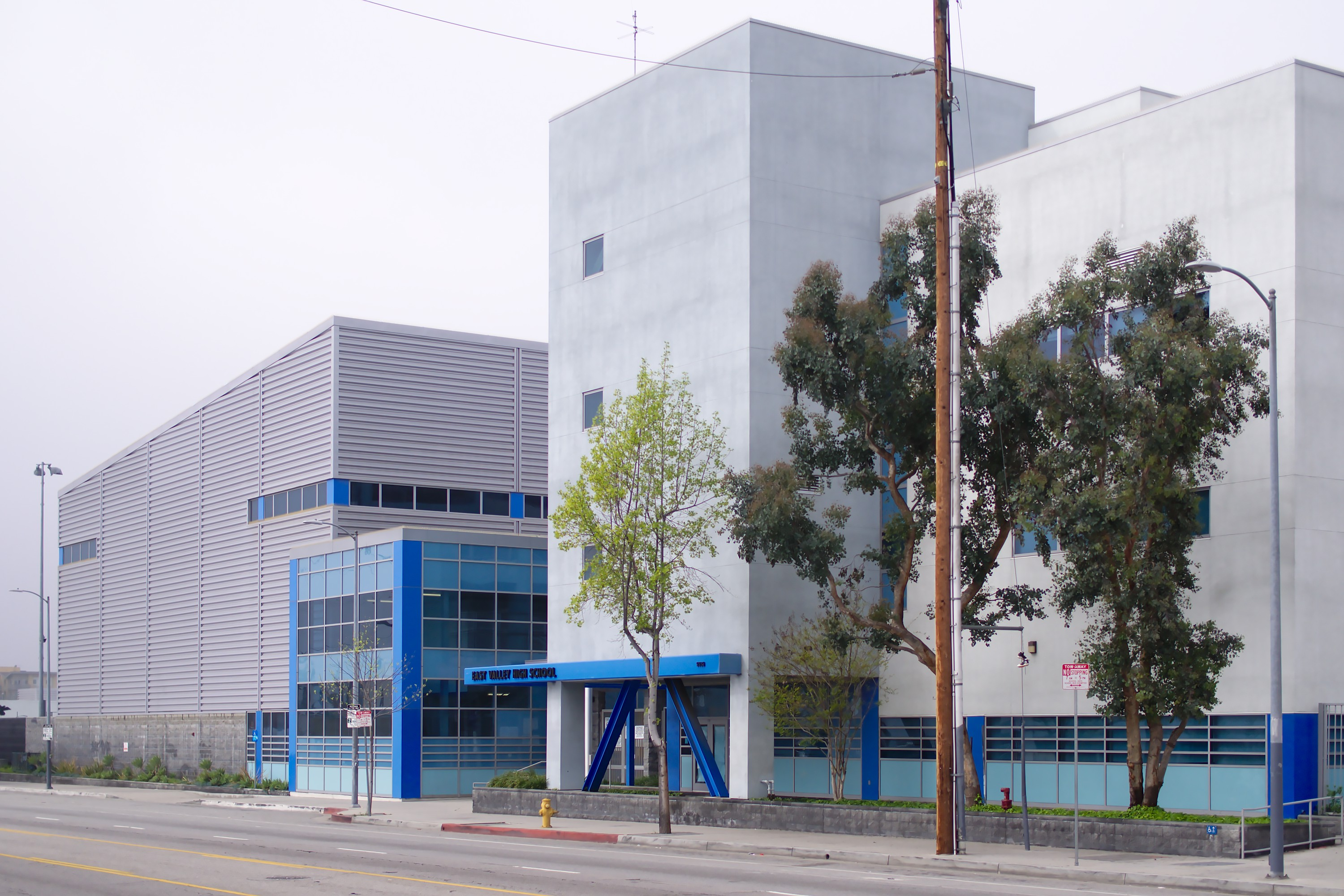
East Valley High School

Eighteen percent of North Hollywood residents aged 25 and older had earned a four-year degree by 2000, an average figure for both the city and the county. The percentage of the same-age residents with less than a high school diploma was high for the county.

Schools within the North Hollywood boundaries are:

=== Public ===
- Bellingham Primary Center Elementary School, 6728 Bellingham Avenue
- Fair Avenue Elementary School, 6501 Fair Avenue
- Lankershim Elementary School, 5250 Bakman Avenue
- Maurice Sendak Elementary School, 11414 West Tiara Street
- Oxnard Street Elementary School, 10912 Oxnard Street
- Victory Boulevard Elementary School, 6315 Radford Avenue
- James Madison Middle School, 13000 Hart St
- Roy Romer Middle School, 6501 Laurel Canyon Boulevard
- North Hollywood High School, 5231 Colfax Avenue
- East Valley High School, 5525 Vineland Avenue
- The Science Academy STEM Magnet (7 year college preparatory), 5525 Vineland Avenue
- North Hollywood Adult Learning Center, LAUSD Adult Education, 10952 Whipple Street

=== Private ===
- Penny Lane, a center for children who were abused by their family members and bullies, in existence since 2013. NOTE: This was the former site of the Dubnoff Center for Child Development, K–12, 10526 Dubnoff Way. The school's main building was designed in 1965 by Ena Dubnoff in association with Flores, Gelman and Green, completed in 1968. Penny Lane bought out the Dubnoff Center in 2013 due to the Dubnoff Center losing money and facing bankruptcy and liquidation issues.
- San Fernando Valley Professional School, K–12, 6215 Laurel Canyon Boulevard
- St. Paul's First Lutheran, Pre-K-8, 11330 McCormick Street, a school of the Wisconsin Evangelical Lutheran Synod (WELS)
- St. Patrick Elementary School, 10626 Erwin Street
- Montessori Academy of North Hollywood, elementary, 6000 Ensign Avenue
- Laurel Hall, elementary, 11919 Oxnard Street
- Oakwood High School, 11600 Magnolia Blvd
- Or Hachaim Academy, elementary, 6021 Laurel Canyon Boulevard
- The Wesley School, elementary, 4832 Tujunga Avenue
- St. Charles Borromeo, elementary, 10650 Moorpark Street

=== Libraries ===
- North Hollywood Amelia Earhart Regional Library
- Valley Plaza Branch Library

== Infrastructure ==
=== Transportation ===
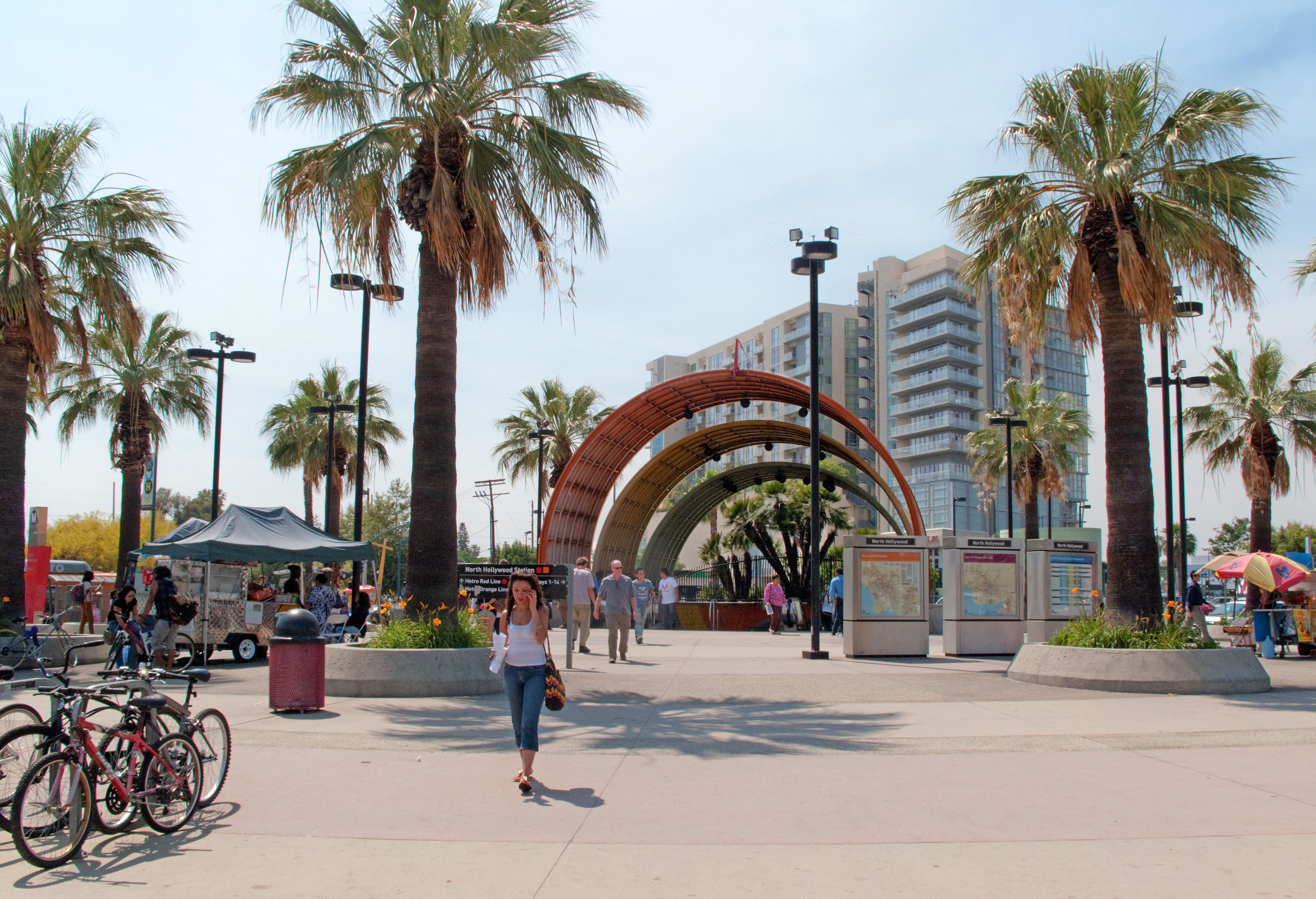
North Hollywood LA Metro station

NoHo Arts District gateway sign.

The Los Angeles County Transportation Commission approved the construction of the subway connecting North Hollywood to Hollywood, East Hollywood, Koreatown, Westlake and downtown Los Angeles along the Metro Rail Red Line in 1990. The decision followed the Los Angeles City Council unanimously endorsing North Hollywood as the northern terminal of the Red Line with the final route having termini at Union Station and North Hollywood. The North Hollywood Metro Subway station opened in June 2000. Close to half a million people took advantage of free rides on the 17.4-mile (28.0 km) Red Line subway in its first weekend in operation. The station is the starting point for the B Line of the Metro subway, which cost $4.5 billion to build.

Instead of a further B Line extension further into the Valley, Metro built the Metro G Line bus rapid transit. Its terminus is located across the street from the subway station. This expanded the station area into a transit hub, and many local and rapid buses now stop at the station. Proposals have been made to extend the B Line northeasterly to Bob Hope Airport in Burbank and the Downtown Burbank Metrolink station in downtown Burbank, or to extend it in a northwesterly direction along Lankershim Boulevard and eventually to Sylmar. Neither project is currently funded nor is included in Metro's Long Term Transportation Plan. The North Hollywood to Pasadena Bus Rapid Transit Project was approved by the Metro board April 28, 2022, and is expected to be completed by 2024. It has promised to provide faster bus service to Glendale and Pasadena.

== Notable people ==
- Gene Autry, actor
- Corbin Bernsen, actor
- Brennan Boesch (born 1985), MLB baseball outfielder
- Everett G. Burkhalter (1897–1975), California politician
- Adam Carolla, North Hollywood High School
- Jordan Cohen (born 1997), American-Israeli basketball player in the Israeli Basketball Premier League
- Nudie Cohn, tailor
- Vince DiMaggio, MLB center fielder
- Michael Erush (born 1984), soccer player and coach
- Teri Garr (1944–2024), actress
- Tina Jordan (born 1972), model
- Dorothy Lamour, actress
- Robin Lopez and Brook Lopez, NBA basketball players
- Bruce Manson (born 1956), tennis player
- Tony Robbins (born 1960), author, motivational speaker
- Hervé Villechaize (1943–1993), actor
- Wilson Weddington (1847–1923), postmaster and original landowner
- Jim Wilson, City Council member
- Danielle von Zerneck, actress
