= List of holding companies =

Under the United States Bank Holding Company Act, financial and bank holding companies are regulated by the US Federal Reserve. Companies whose elections to be treated as financial holding companies are effective include:

== 0 - 9 ==
- 1ST UNITED BANCORP, INC., Boca Raton, Florida

== A ==
- Ackermans & van Haaren, Antwerp, Belgium
- Akbank, İstanbul, Turkey
- Ally Financial, Detroit, Michigan
- Alerus Financial, Grand Forks, North Dakota
- Alphabet, Mountain View, California
- American Express, New York, New York
- Apple Bank for Savings, New York, New York
- Australia and New Zealand Banking Group, Melbourne, Australia
- Ayala Corporation, Makati City, Philippines

== B ==
- BancFirst Corporation, Oklahoma City, Oklahoma
- Banco Bradesco, Osasco, Brazil
- Banco do Brasil, Brasilia, Brazil
- BancorpSouth, Tupelo, Mississippi
- Bank Hapoalim, Tel Aviv, Israel
- Bank of America Corporation, Charlotte, North Carolina
- Bank of Montreal, Montreal, Canada
- The Bank of New York Mellon Corporation, New York, New York
- Bank of Nova Scotia, Toronto, Canada
- Barclays, London, England
- Berkshire Hathaway, America
- BNP Paribas, Paris, France
- BOK Financial Corporation, Tulsa, Oklahoma
- Busey Bank, Urbana, Illinois
- Booking Holdings, Norwalk, Connecticut

== C ==
- Caja de Ahorros y Monte de Piedad de Madrid, Madrid, Spain
- Canadian Imperial Bank of Commerce, Toronto, Canada
- Capital One Financial Corporation, McLean, Virginia
- Cardinal Financial Corporation, McLean, Virginia
- Citigroup Inc., New York, New York
- Citizens Bancorp, Corvallis, Oregon
- City National Corporation, Beverly Hills, California
- Comerica Incorporated, Dallas, Texas
- Commercial National Financial, Latrobe, Pennsylvania
- Commerzbank AG, Frankfurt, Germany
- Crédit Agricole S.A., Paris, France
- Credit Suisse Group, Zurich, Switzerland
- CULLEN/FROST BANKERS, INC., San Antonio, Texas

== D ==
- Deutsche Bank AG, Frankfurt, Germany
- DNB NOR ASA, Oslo, Norway
- Doral Financial Corporation, San Juan, Puerto Rico
- Drexel Morgan & Co., Radnor, Pennsylvania
- DZ Bank AG, Frankfurt, Germany

== E ==
- East West Bancorp, Inc., Pasadena, California
- Exor, Turin, Italy

== F ==
- Fifth Third Bancorp, Cincinnati, Ohio
- First Bancorp, San Juan, Puerto Rico
- First Citizens Bancorporation, Inc., Columbia, South Carolina
- First Citizens BancShares, Inc., Dyersburg, Tennessee
- First Citizens BancShares, Inc., Raleigh, North Carolina
- First City Monument Bank Ltd, Lagos, Nigeria
- First Commonwealth Financial Corporation, Indiana, Pennsylvania
- First Horizon National Corporation, Memphis, Tennessee
- First Interstate BancSystem, Inc., Billings, Montana
- First Merchants Corporation, Muncie, Indiana
- First Pacific Company Limited, incorporated in Bermuda, listed in Hong Kong, Asia Pacific-focused
- FNB Corporation, Hermitage, Pennsylvania

== G ==
- Goldman Sachs, New York, New York
- The Governor and Company of the Bank of Ireland, Dublin, Ireland
- Green Dot Corporation, Monrovia, California
- GT Capital, Philippines

== H ==
- Heirs Holdings, Lagos, Nigeria
- Horizon Bancorp, Michigan City, Indiana
- HSBC Holdings Plc, London, United Kingdom
- HSH Nordbank AG, Hamburg, Germany
- HTLF Bank, Denver, Colorado
- Huntington Bancshares, Columbus, Ohio

== I ==
- Iberiabank Corporation, Lafayette, Louisiana
- International Bancshares Corporation, Laredo, Texas

== J ==
- JPMorgan Chase, New York, USA
- JG Summit Holdings, Philippines

== K ==
- KBC Bank NV, Brussels, Belgium
- Keycorp, Cleveland, Ohio
- Klein Financial, Inc., Chaska, Minnesota
- Koç Holding, İstanbul, Turkey

== L ==
- Landesbank Baden-Württemberg, Stuttgart, Germany
- Lauritzen Corporation, Omaha, Nebraska
- Lloyds Banking Group, London, England
- LT Group, Taguig, Philippines
- Lopez Group of Companies, Pasig City, Philippines

== M ==
- M&T Bank Corporation, Buffalo, New York
- Mainsource Financial Group, Greensburg, Indiana
- MidwestOne Financial Group, Inc., Iowa City, Iowa
- Metro Pacific Investments Corporation, a Philippine unit of First Pacific (see F)
- Mitsubishi UFJ Financial Group, Tokyo, Japan
- Mizuho Financial Group Inc., Tokyo, Japan
- Morgan Stanley, New York, New York

== N ==
- National Australia Bank Limited, Melbourne, Australia
- National Bank of Canada, Montreal, Canada
- Natixis, Paris, France
- NatWest Group, Edinburgh, Scotland
- NBT Bancorp Inc., Norwich, New York
- New York Private Bank & Trust Corporation, New York, New York
- Norinchukin Bank, Tokyo, Japan.
- Northern Trust Corporation, Chicago, Illinois

== O ==
- Old National Bancorp, Evansville, Indiana
- Oriental Financial Group Inc., San Juan, Puerto Rico

== P ==
- Park National Corporation, Newark, Ohio
- Patriot National Bancorp, Stamford, Connecticut
- Peoples Bancorp, Rock Valley, Iowa
- PNC Financial Services Group, Inc., Pittsburgh, Pennsylvania

== R ==
- Rabobank, Utrecht, the Netherlands
- Regions Financial Corporation, Birmingham, Alabama
- Royal Bank of Canada, Montreal, Canada

== S ==
- Sabancı Holding, Istanbul, Turkey
- San Miguel Corporation, Mandaluyong City, Philippines
- Skandinaviska Enskilda Banken, Stockholm, Sweden
- SM Investments, Pasay City, Philippines
- Société Générale, Paris, France
- SoftBank Group, Tokyo, Japan
- State Street Corporation, Boston, Massachusetts
- Sterling Bancorp, New York, New York
- System Capital Management, Kyiv, Ukraine

== T ==
- Truist Financial, Charlotte, North Carolina

== U ==
- U.S. Bancorp, Minneapolis, Minnesota
- UBS, Zurich, Switzerland
- UMB Financial Corporation, Kansas City, Missouri
- United Airlines Holdings, Chicago, Illinois,

== W ==
- Webster Financial Corporation, Waterbury, Connecticut
- Wells Fargo, San Francisco, California
- WesBanco, Wheeling, West Virginia
- Wintrust Financial Corporation, Lake Forest, Illinois

== Y ==
- Yapı Kredi, İstanbul, Turkey

== Z ==
- Zions Bancorporation, Salt Lake City, Utah
