= ScoreBig =

- Type: Private
- Industry: Live entertainment
- Founded: Los Angeles, California, U.S. (2009)
- Founder: Adam Kanner; Joel Milne
- Headquarters: South Windsor, Connecticut, U.S.
- Area served: U.S.
- Key people: Don Vaccaro, CEO
- Products: Last minute ticket sales; tickets to sold-out events
- Website: scorebig.com

ScoreBig is a startup company headquartered in South Windsor, Connecticut, United States. It focuses on the liquidation and sale of “undersold” ticket inventory for sports, concerts, theater, and other live entertainment events.

== Ticket service ==
ScoreBig allows event goers to purchase last minute tickets to sold-out events in addition to the latest on sales occurring for popular artists, teams, and productions. ScoreBig safeguards their transactions with a 200% money-back guarantee, under a secure checkout, with interactive seat maps to guide ticket purchases.

== History ==
ScoreBig was founded by Adam Kanner and Joel Milne in 2009. Kanner served as the vice president of relationship marketing and business development for the NBA (National Basketball Association). Milne previous led Ivize, a litigation services company, as the CEO. He founded a season ticketing software named Season Ticket Solutions. Kanner and Milne were joined by David Goldberg, (CEO, formerly the executive vice president of Ticketmaster and the CEO at Youbet.com), Neil Kaplan (chief revenue officer, formerly at Internet Brands and Vantage Media), Alison Burnham (vice president of Pricing and Analytics), Peter Sinclair (vice president of Marketing—formerly GM of the Online Channel at Green Dot and engagement manager at McKinsey & Company), and David Marcus (SVP of Partnerships—formerly at Ticketmaster and Warner Music Group).

ScoreBig launched to members-only on December 15, 2010, with more than 600,000 tickets available. On February 3, 2011, ScoreBig announced a partnership with TicketBiscuit, adding tickets from comedy clubs, music vendors and event organizers to ScoreBig's inventory. In April 2011, ScoreBig raised $14 million in series B funding led by U.S. Venture Partners. In September 2013, ScoreBig raised $10 million in new funding from Checketts Partners Investment Fund (CPIF) and announced the hiring of a key industry veteran, long time board advisor and former Ticketmaster EVP David Goldberg.

In October 2014, ScoreBig announced that it has raised $18M in new funding led by Hearst Ventures with participation from both new and existing investors. In January 2015, ScoreBig announced a multiyear partnership with Ticketmaster, in which it will become directly integrated with the industry giant's primary ticketing system. In the deal, ScoreBig appeared as a purchase option for events involving teams and event promoters which were clients of the two companies and chose to opt in. The partnership includes several cross-promotional, marketing and online traffic-sharing components, and the shared clients received additional data on customer ticket searching and purchase patterns.

On November 12, 2016, ScoreBig.com came under the management of a subsidiary of TicketNetwork Inc. The subsidiary acquired and licensed select assets of the company formerly known as ScoreBig Inc, which went out of business in September 2016. The subsidiary has operated scorebig.com since then.
