= Sam Altman =

American entrepreneur (born 1985)

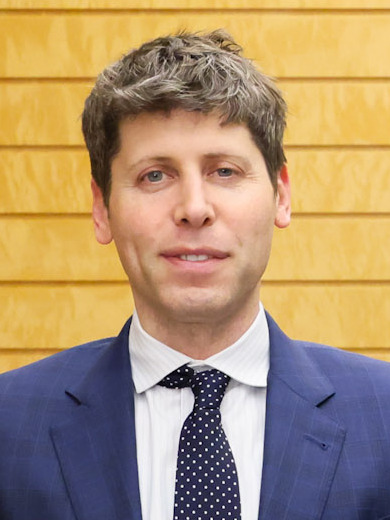
- Altman in 2025
- Born: Samuel Harris Altman; April 22, 1985 (age 41); Chicago, Illinois, U.S.
- Education: Stanford University (dropped out)
- Notable work: Loopt (co-founder); OpenAI (co-founder)
- Title: CEO of OpenAI; Chairman of Helion Energy; President of Y Combinator (until 2019)
- Spouse: Oliver Mulherin (m. 2024)
- Children: 1
- Relatives: Jack Altman (brother)
- Website: blog.samaltman.com

Samuel Harris Altman (/ˈɔːltmən/ AWLT-mən; born April 22, 1985) is an American entrepreneur and investor who has been the chief executive officer (CEO) of the artificial intelligence company OpenAI since 2019.

Altman attended Stanford University for two years before he dropped out and co-founded Loopt, a geosocial networking application for smartphones. Loopt was acquired by Green Dot Corporation for $43.4 million in March 2012. In 2011, Altman joined Y Combinator, a technology startup accelerator and venture capital firm, and was the company's president from 2014 to 2019. He is a billionaire, due to investments in over 400 companies including Reddit, Worldcoin, Helion Energy and Instacart.

Altman co-founded OpenAI in 2015 and became its CEO in 2019, a role that made him a prominent figure of the AI boom. He supervised the launch of ChatGPT in November 2022. In 2023, he was ousted by the organization's board of directors for not being "consistently candid". The move was met with significant backlash from employees and investors, resulting in Altman's reinstatement five days later and the formation of a new board.

== Early life ==
Altman was born in Chicago on April 22, 1985, to a Jewish American family. His mother, Connie Gibstine, is a dermatologist, and his father, Jerry Altman, was a real estate broker. He is the eldest of four siblings: he has two brothers, one of which being investor Jack Altman, and a sister. His paternal great-grandfather was born in Płock, Poland, and his paternal great-grandmother was born in Płońsk, Poland. In 1989, the Altman family moved to Jerry's hometown of Clayton, Missouri.

At eight, Altman received his first computer—an Apple Macintosh—and began learning how to code and disassemble and examine computer hardware. He attended Wydown Middle School and briefly Clayton High School, both located in Clayton, before moving to The John Burroughs School, a private institution in neighboring Ladue. In 2005, after studying computer science for two years at Stanford University in Stanford, California, he dropped out without earning a bachelor's degree.

== Business career ==
=== Early career ===
In 2005, at the age of 19, Altman co-founded Loopt, a location-based social networking mobile application. As CEO, he raised more than $30 million in venture capital for the company, including an initial investment of $5 million from Patrick Chung of Xfund and his team at New Enterprise Associates, followed by investments from Sequoia Capital and Y Combinator. The company bought geolocation data from cellular providers and attempted to make an early social network for users to see where their friends were in real time. The board of Loopt attempted, twice, to remove Altman from his role as CEO, but Altman's supporters defended him and stated the attempts were not serious. In March 2012, after Loopt failed to gain significant user traction, the company was acquired by the Green Dot Corporation for $43.4 million.

=== Y Combinator ===
In 2011, Altman became a partner at startup accelerator Y Combinator (YC), initially working on a part-time basis. In February 2014, he became president of YC, replacing YC co-founder Paul Graham, who had been his mentor. Altman aimed to expand YC to fund 1,000 new companies per year and sought to broaden the types of companies funded, particularly focusing on "hard technology" startups. In October 2015, Altman was involved in expanding YC's scope. He invested in multiple startups such as Stripe, Inc. In September 2016, Altman's role at YC expanded to president of YC Group, which included Y Combinator and other units. By 2018, Altman's role at OpenAI made him less often present at YC, and several YC partners had complained to Graham that Altman was using his role to have the priority in investment opportunities. Graham said that Altman had agreed to leave YC, but was resisting in practice.

YC moved its headquarters to San Francisco in 2019. In March, Altman and YC began to falsely claim that Altman had transitioned from president to a less hands-on role as chairman of the board, allowing him to focus on OpenAI. Graham was "unambiguous that Altman was removed because of Y.C. partners' mistrust".

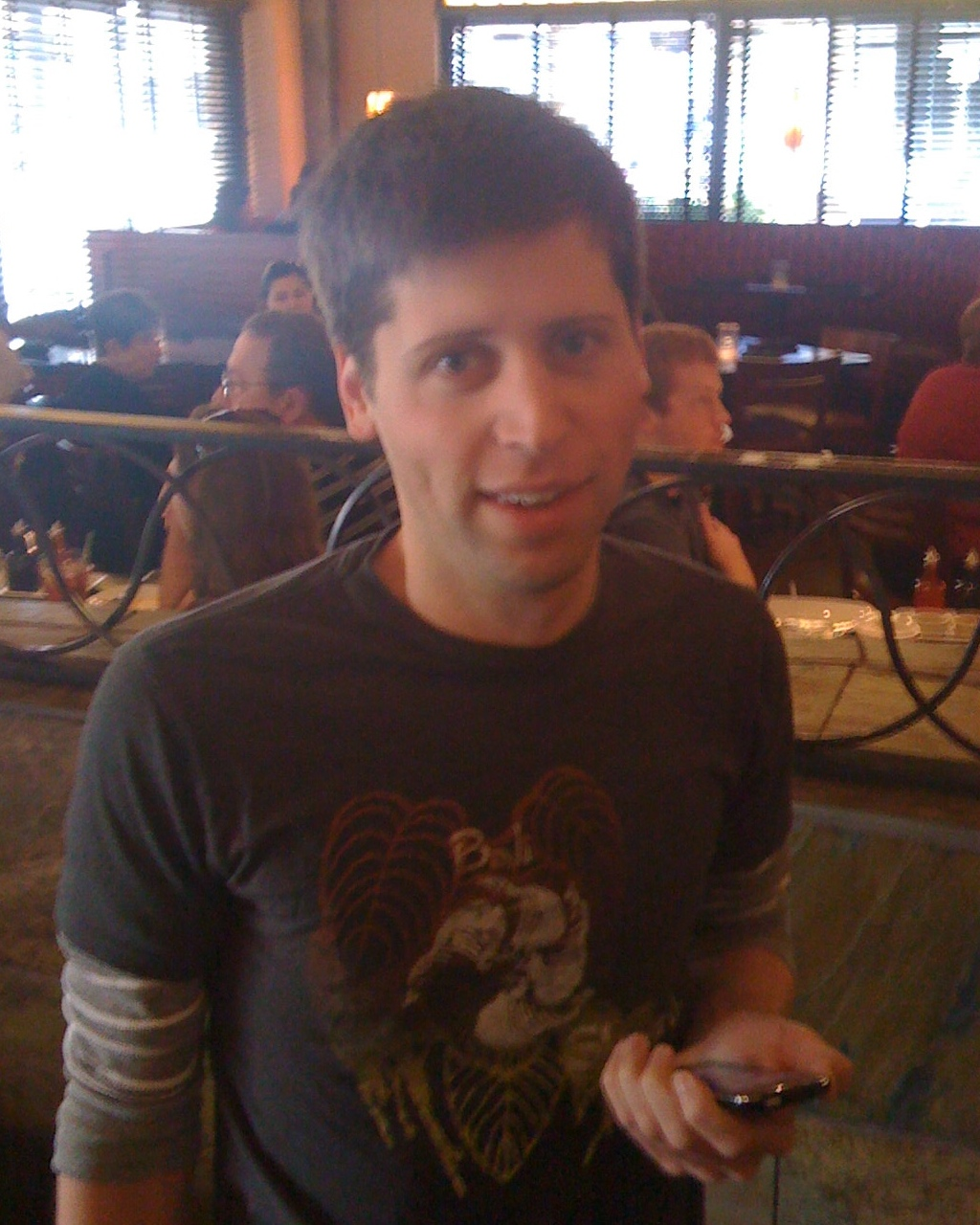
Altman in 2009 as CEO of Loopt

=== Investor ===
As of June 2024, Altman's investment portfolio includes stakes in over 400 companies, valued at around $2.8 billion. Some of these investments intersect with companies doing business with OpenAI, which has raised questions about potential conflicts of interest. OpenAI's chairman of the board, Bret Taylor, maintained that Altman has been transparent about his investments.

In April 2012, Altman co-founded Hydrazine Capital with his brother, Jack Altman. The initial $21 million fund included a large part of the $5 million he got from selling Loopt, but most came from Peter Thiel, his mentor and main backer in Silicon Valley. Sam Altman invested 75 percent of the money in Y-Combinator companies. In 2023, when Hydrazine launched its fourth fund, the University of Michigan endowment was the only outside investor. Its investments in Hydrazine were the largest the endowment has made. Altman debuted on the Bloomberg Billionaires Index in March 2024 with an estimated net worth of $2 billion, primarily from his venture capital funds related to Hydrazine Capital. He was invited to attend the Bilderberg Meeting in 2016, 2022, and 2023.

Altman has served on the board of three Hong Kong– and Singapore-based SPAC companies named Bridgetown (sponsored by Thiel Capital and Richard Li's Pacific Century) alongside Matt Danzeisen, chairman of the SPACs and spouse of Thiel.

==== Biotech ====
Altman has several other investments in companies including Humane, which was developing a wearable AI-powered device; Retro Biosciences, a research company aiming to extend human life by 10 years; Boom Technology, a supersonic airline developer; Cruise, a self-driving car company later acquired by General Motors; and Helion Energy, an American fusion research company.

During the COVID-19 pandemic, Altman helped fund and create Project Covalence to help researchers rapidly launch clinical trials in partnership with TrialSpark, a clinical trial startup. During the depositor run on Silicon Valley Bank in mid-March 2023, Altman provided capital to multiple startups. Altman invests in technology startups and nuclear energy companies. Some of his portfolio companies include Airbnb, Stripe, and Retro Biosciences. Along with Peter Thiel, Altman was an early seed investor in Minicircle, "a longevity biotech company focused on developing gene therapies to extend human lifespans". He also invested in charter city projects Próspera and Praxis, which have gotten additional financial support from author and former Coinbase CTO Balaji Srinivasan. Both cities have been associated by various publications and journalists with the Network State movement.

Altman at the 2024 World Economic Forum

==== Reddit ====
For eight days in 2014, Altman was the CEO of Reddit, a social media company, after CEO Yishan Wong resigned. On July 10, 2015, he announced the return of Steve Huffman as CEO. He remained on its board until 2022. Altman invested in multiple rounds of funding for Reddit (in 2014, 2015, and 2021). Prior to Reddit's initial public offering in 2024, Altman was listed as its third-largest shareholder, with around 9% ownership.

==== Worldcoin ====
In 2019, Altman co-founded the for-profit company Tools For Humanity with Alex Blania (CEO) and others. The company promoted the Worldcoin cryptocurrency and eye-scanning systems to provide proof of personhood and authentication. However, it has engaged in deceptive marketing practices to drive sign-ups. By 2023, Tools For Humanity had scanned two million people's eyes and raised $250 million from several investors, including Andreessen Horowitz and Sam Bankman-Fried.

Kenya was one of the first countries to register Worldcoin. The promise of free money led to rapid growth in Kenya until Worldcoin promotion was paused by regulators. Citing legal concerns over biometric data privacy and potential fraud concerns, regulators in France, the United Kingdom, Bavaria, South Korea, Spain, Portugal, and Hong Kong have investigated or suspended Worldcoin. WorldCoin has never been offered in the United States and the company limits its disclosures due to regulatory scrutiny.

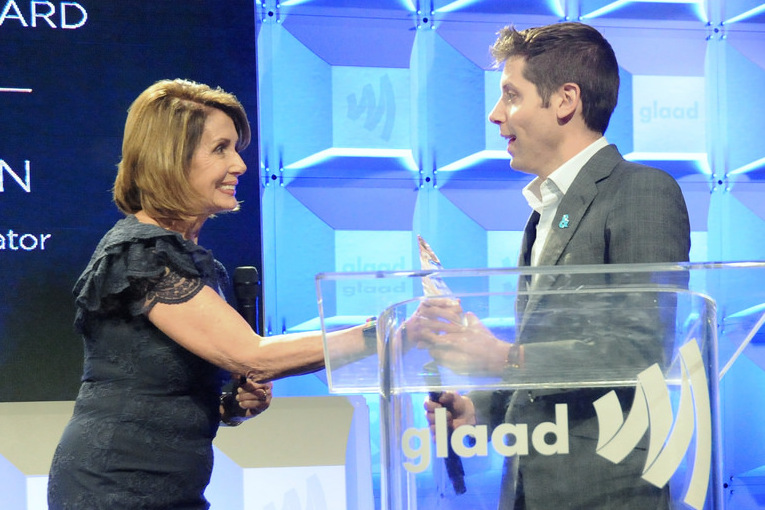
Nancy Pelosi presenting Altman with the Ric Weiland Award in 2017

==== Energy investments ====
Altman is chairman of the board for Helion Energy, a company focused on developing nuclear fusion. He also invested in Exowatt, a solar energy startup that aims to provide clean energy to data centers. In March 2021, Altman and investment banker Michael Klein co-founded AltC Acquisition Corp, a special-purpose acquisition company (SPAC), where he was also the CEO. In May 2024, the nuclear fission company Oklo Inc. completed a merger with the SPAC to become a public company. Altman remained as chairman of Oklo following the merger until stepping down in April 2025 to "avoid conflict of interest" and "open up opportunities for future deals between OpenAI and Oklo".

=== OpenAI ===
==== OpenAI begins ====
OpenAI was initially founded as a nonprofit organization by Altman, Greg Brockman, Elon Musk, Jessica Livingston, Peter Thiel, Microsoft, Amazon Web Services, Infosys, and YC Research. Altman tenaciously recruited Ilya Sutskever and Dario Amodei by giving them attention and offering YC stock. In his early conversations with Musk, he framed OpenAI as competing against Google's AI development. Google was far ahead; Musk and Altman modeled their strategy after the Manhattan Project with an emphasis on recruiting AI technology leaders and convincing the world that they were protecting against the AI threat.

When OpenAI launched in 2015, it had raised pledges for $1 billion. In 2019, OpenAI said that $130 million of the pledged funds had been collected. TechCrunch reported that YC Research never contributed any of their pledged funds.

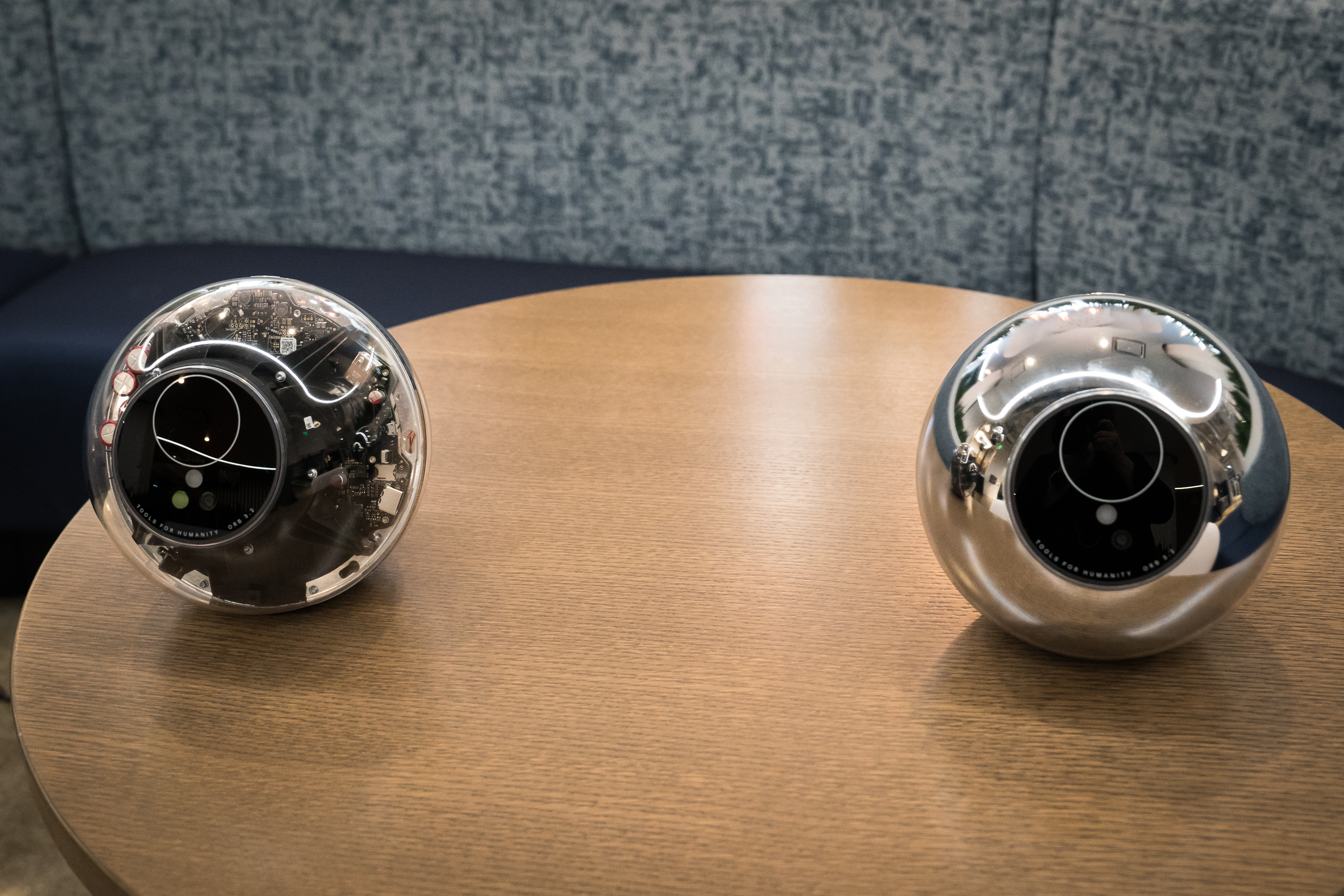
Orb-shaped iris scanners on display

Altman said in 2015 that they were partly motivated by concerns about AI safety and existential risk from artificial general intelligence. He said that open-source would reduce those risks, arguing that if everyone has access to powerful AI, its users would be able to counter a small minority of bad actors. Altman noted it would be a decades-long project that eventually surpasses human intelligence. Walter Isaacson opined that Altman had "Musk-like intensity".

On September 12, 2026, Sam Altman publicly agreed with Anthropic CEO Dario Amodei's call to slow the development of advanced AI and advocated for independent evaluators to be embedded within AI companies.

==== Deepening investment in OpenAI ====
In 2018, Musk, a long-time personal friend of Altman's, resigned from his Board of Directors seat, citing "a potential future conflict [of interest]" with his role as CEO of Tesla due to Tesla's AI development for self-driving cars. In February 2024, Musk sued OpenAI and Altman, alleging they broke the company's founding agreement by prioritizing profit over benefit to humanity. OpenAI executives, including Altman, dismissed these claims in a blog post. The post said that the startup received only $45 million from Musk instead of his pledged $1 billion, and that Musk proposed to merge it with Tesla.

In March 2019, Altman left Y Combinator and began focusing full-time as CEO of OpenAI. Through 2017, Brockman and Sutskever oversaw the day to day business and Altman touched base approximately once a week. Sutskever opposed Altman moving to an AI role because Altman's motivation were unclear and it opened the possibility of an "AI dictator". The three leaders made an informal agreement that Altman would step down if the other two requested. OpenAI planned to spend $1 billion "within five years, and possibly much faster". Altman stated that even a billion dollars may turn out to be insufficient, and that the lab may ultimately need "more capital than any non-profit has ever raised" to achieve artificial general intelligence (AGI).

==== Release of ChatGPT ====
In December 2022, OpenAI received widespread media coverage after launching a free preview of ChatGPT, a new AI chatbot based on GPT-3.5. According to OpenAI, the preview received over a million signups within the first five days. According to anonymous sources cited by Reuters in December 2022, OpenAI Global, LLC was projecting $200 million of revenue in 2023 and $1 billion in revenue in 2024.

The percentage of US adults who have ever used ChatGPT, according to Pew Research, is shown. As of March 2025, 58% of those under 30 have used the chatbot.

Altman testified before the United States Senate Judiciary Subcommittee on Privacy, Technology and the Law on May 16, 2023, about issues of AI oversight. After the success of ChatGPT, Altman made a world tour in May 2023, during which he visited 22 countries and met multiple leaders and diplomats, including British prime minister Rishi Sunak, French president Emmanuel Macron, Spanish prime minister Pedro Sánchez, German chancellor Olaf Scholz, Indian prime minister Narendra Modi, South Korean president Yoon Suk-yeol, Israeli president Isaac Herzog, and European Commission president Ursula von der Leyen. Altman was named one of the 100 most influential people in the world by Time magazine. Altman stated that being CEO was fun until the release of ChatGPT; then the decisions became much more difficult.

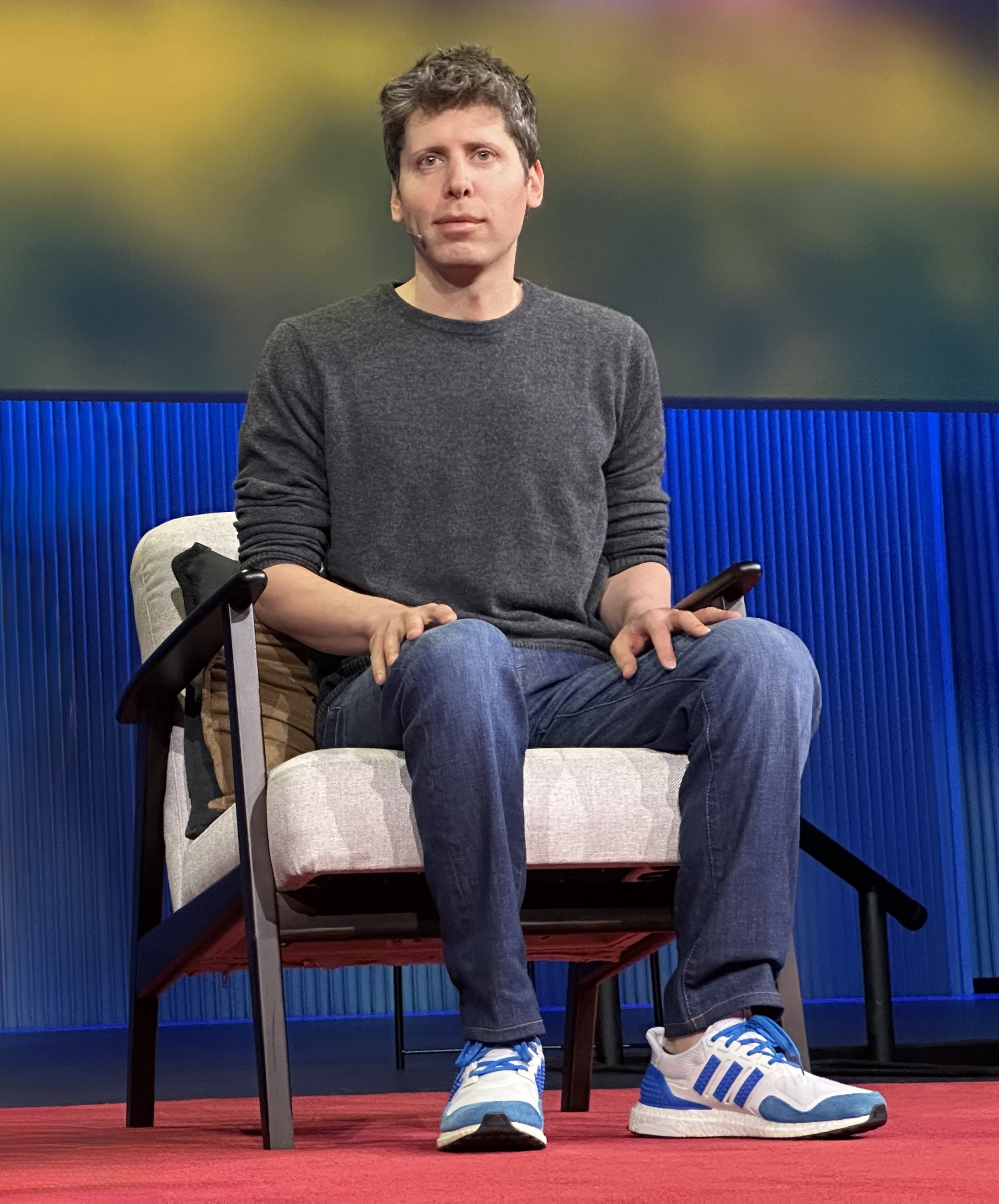
Altman at TED in 2025

The emergence of the Chinese AI company DeepSeek led major Chinese tech firms to embrace an open-source strategy, intensifying competition with OpenAI. Altman acknowledged the uncertainty regarding U.S. government approval for AI cooperation with China, but emphasized the importance of fostering dialogue between technological leaders in both nations.

==== Removal and reinstatement as OpenAI CEO ====
On November 17, 2023, OpenAI's board, composed of researcher Helen Toner, Quora CEO Adam D'Angelo, AI governance advocate Tasha McCauley, and, most prominently in the firing, OpenAI co-founder and chief scientist Ilya Sutskever, announced that they had made the decision to remove Altman as CEO and Greg Brockman from the board, both of whom were co-founders. The announcement cited that Altman "was not consistently candid in his communications". In response, Brockman resigned from his role as President of OpenAI. According to The New Yorker, Altman returned to his home and coordinated with consultant Chris Lehane, Airbnb executive Brian Chesky, and a team of staff to implement a strategy for his reinstatement. Altman stated that his team was focused on damaging interim CEO Mira Murati's reputation. The day after Altman was removed, the board discussed bringing him back to OpenAI.

On November 20, 2023, Microsoft CEO Satya Nadella announced that Altman would be joining Microsoft to lead a new advanced AI research team. Two days later, OpenAI employees published an open letter to the board threatening to leave OpenAI and join Microsoft, where all employees had been promised jobs, unless all board members step down and reinstate Altman as CEO. 505 employees initially signed, which later grew to over 700 out of 770 total employees. This included Ilya Sutskever, who initially advocated for firing Altman, but then stated on Twitter "I regret my participation in the board's actions." On November 20, the board reached an agreement where most of the existing board members departed, an independent investigation into Altman's conduct was planned and Altman and Brockman returned to their roles. On November 21, 2023, after continued negotiations, Altman and Brockman returned to the company. D'Angelo remained on the board and was joined by Bret Taylor (as chairman) and Lawrence Summers. Brockman took a sabbatical from August 2024 to November 2024.

In May 2024, after OpenAI's non-disparagement agreements were exposed, Altman was accused of lying when claiming to have been unaware of the equity cancellation provision for departing employees who don't sign the agreement. Also in May, former board member Helen Toner explained the board's rationale for firing Altman in November 2023. She stated that Altman had withheld information, for example by not informing the board in advance of ChatGPT's release and by not disclosing his ownership of OpenAI's startup fund. She also alleged that two executives in OpenAI had reported "psychological abuse" from Altman, and provided screenshots and documentation to support their claims. She said that many employees feared retaliation if they didn't support Altman, and that when Altman was Loopt's CEO, the management team asked twice to fire him for what they called "deceptive and chaotic behavior".

On September 2, 2026, Altman spoke at the G20 Innovation Ministerial in Chapel Hill, North Carolina, where he urged countries to adopt AI, describing its use as "non-negotiable" because of its potential economic and societal benefits. He compared the importance of adopting AI to the adoption of electricity more than a century earlier. Altman also warned that inadequate cybersecurity measures could cause significant problems and set back AI development.

==== Elon Musk lawsuit ====
On April 27, 2026, jury selection began in OpenAI co-founder Elon Musk's lawsuit against OpenAI and its current executives, including Altman. On April 28, 2026, trial testimony was by now underway, with Elon Musk beginning his testimony against Altman and OpenAI. On April 30, 2026 Musk would enter his third day of testimony. Musk ultimately lost the case, with the jury unanimously agreeing he waited too long to file suit against Altman and OpenAI.

== Political engagement ==
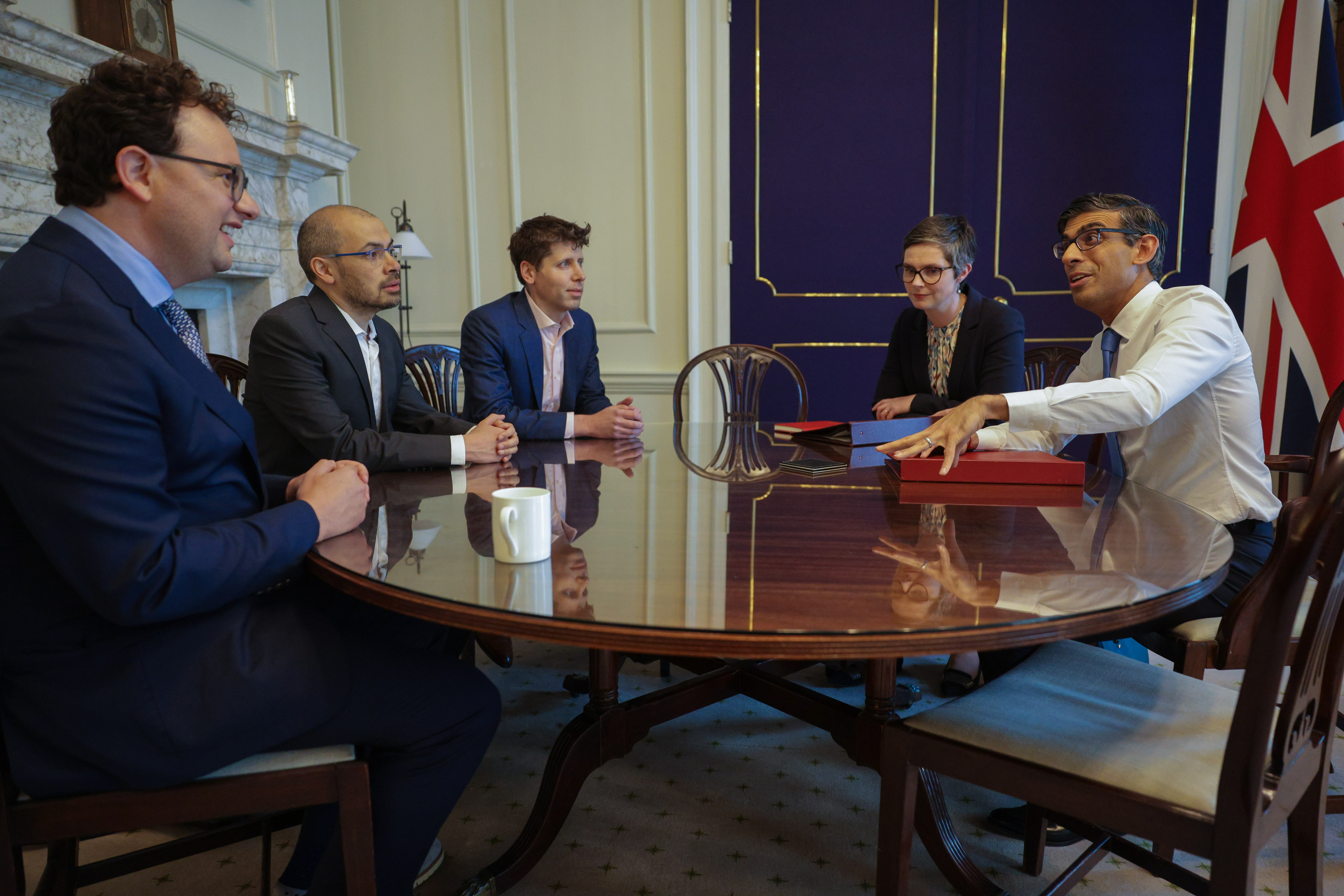
Then Prime Minister of the UK Rishi Sunak and Technology Secretary Chloe Smith meets with Demis Hassabis (CEO of DeepMind), Dario Amodei (CEO of Anthropic), and Altman (CEO of OpenAI) in May 2023.

Altman had contemplated running for governor of California in the 2018 election, but later decided not to enter. In 2018, Altman announced "the United Slate", a political project to improve U.S. housing and healthcare policy. In 2019, Altman held a fundraiser at his home in San Francisco for 2020 Democratic presidential candidate and fellow tech entrepreneur Andrew Yang. In May 2020, Altman donated $250,000 to American Bridge 21st Century, a super PAC supporting Democratic presidential candidate Joe Biden.

In 2021, Altman published a blog post titled "Moore's Law for Everything", which stated his belief that within ten years, AI could generate enough value to fund a universal basic income (UBI) of $13,500 per year to every adult in the United States. In 2024, he suggested a new kind of UBI called "universal basic compute" to give everyone a "slice" of ChatGPT's computing power. In an interview given to The Atlantic's CEO Nicholas Thompson in April 2026, Altman stated that he "no longer believe[s] in universal basic income as much as [he] once did".

In 2023, Altman was involved in boosting Representative Dean Phillips as he prepared a challenge to President Joe Biden for the Democratic nomination. On November 18, 2024, San Francisco Mayor-Elect Daniel Lurie named him to his transition team. In December 2024, Altman donated $1 million to the Inaugural Fund for President Donald Trump. Altman hosted a fundraiser in San Francisco on March 20, 2025, for Senator Mark Warner, a Democrat up for re-election in 2026 in Virginia.

On July 4, 2025, Altman said that he believed in "techno-capitalism" and found himself increasingly "politically homeless", criticizing the Democratic Party for no longer encouraging a "culture of innovation and entrepreneurship". In September 2025, Altman was interviewed by Tucker Carlson. The interview covered the death of former OpenAI researcher Suchir Balaji and the ideal moral alignment of AI.

== Personal life ==
Altman has been a vegetarian since childhood. He is gay, which he first disclosed at 17 in high school, where he spoke out after some students objected to a National Coming Out Day speaker. He dated Loopt co-founder Nick Sivo for nine years. They broke up shortly after the company was acquired in 2012.

Peter Thiel backed Altman's first venture fund and continued to be Altman's mentor. According to Keach Hagey, Altman met his future husband Oliver Mulherin "in Peter Thiel's hot tub at 3 a.m." in 2015. Mulherin was a computer science student at the University of Melbourne at the time and later became an engineer. He worked on AI projects in Australia before moving to the United States to work for the dementia detection startup SPARK Neuro. Altman married Mulherin in January 2024 at their estate in Hawaii; the couple also live in Russian Hill, San Francisco and often spend weekends in Napa, California. The couple has a son, who was born in 2025 via surrogacy.

Altman and Mulherin committed to giving away most of their wealth by signing The Giving Pledge in May 2024. Altman enjoys prepping and said in 2016, "I have guns, gold, potassium iodide, antibiotics, batteries, water, gas masks from the Israeli Defense Force, and a big patch of land in Big Sur I can fly to."

In January 2025, Altman's sister Ann Altman filed a lawsuit alleging sexual abuse by Altman in the U.S. District Court for the Eastern District of Missouri in St. Louis. The lawsuit alleges that the abuse started when Ann was aged 3 and Sam was 12, and that it continued "several times per week" between 1997 and 2006. According to Ann, the memories of abuse were lost but recovered through flashbacks in her adulthood. The lawsuit requests a jury trial and damages in excess of $75,000. Sam Altman, along with his mother Connie and younger brothers Max and Jack, issued a joint statement denying the allegations and claiming that Ann is mentally ill and "continues to demand money from us" despite being financially supported by the Altman family. In October 2026, the court dismissed the lawsuit with prejudice, after Ann failed to comply with discovery obligations by repeatedly refusing to appear for a medical examination.

In September 2025, the Mohamed bin Zayed University of Artificial Intelligence (MBZUAI) in Abu Dhabi conferred its inaugural Honorary Doctor of Philosophy degree upon Sam Altman.

On April 10, 2026, a 20-year-old man from The Woodlands, Texas, was arrested on suspicion of throwing a Molotov cocktail at the gate of Altman's home in San Francisco and starting a fire. Altman was uninjured. In a blog post, without any public indication of a motive from police, Altman sought to connect the action to opposition to artificial intelligence and mentioned "an incendiary article written about me a few days ago", apparently referring to a New Yorker investigation by Ronan Farrow and Andrew Marantz. He also called for a "de-escalation" of the debate around AI. San Francisco Mayor Daniel Lurie expressed opposition to the attack, and although some social media posts from AI opponents endorsed the attack, activist organizations, such as Stop AI, denounced it. Two days later, shots were fired at the same home from a person in a car. Police arrested two in connection with the shooting.

Altman has described his experiences with psychedelic drugs. He says that these experiences have been transformative, changing him from a formerly "very anxious, unhappy person" to feeling like a "very calm person now". Altman is the chairman of the psychedelic pharmaceutical startup Journey Colab, which is developing psychedelics such as mescaline (JOUR-5700) for medical use. Shortly after being a guest on an October 2026 podcast, Altman received backlash for the comment "it's quite terrible to have everybody have a bunch of the world's limited supply of DRAM sitting in their own computer, and being used maybe 5% of the time", amid concerns that OpenAI is inflating RAM prices.

== In popular culture ==
Altman's 2023 firing and rehiring from OpenAI is the central subject of Luca Guadagnino's biographical comedy drama film Artificial (2026), in which he is portrayed by Andrew Garfield. After watching the film's trailer, Altman described it as looking like an "awful movie", although he acknowledged that Garfield accurately captured his distinctive walk and mannerisms. He also denied having any involvement in Amazon MGM Studios' decision to drop the film following Amazon's announcement of a $50 billion partnership with OpenAI.
