= Santa Barbara Tax Products Group =

American tax refund processor

- Type: Subsidiary
- Industry: Financial services
- Founded: 2010; 16 years ago
- Headquarters: San Diego, California, United States
- Area served: Nationwide
- Parent: Green Dot Corporation
- Website: www.sbtpg.com

Santa Barbara Tax Products Group is an American tax preparation and tax refund company based in San Diego, California. The company services U.S. taxpayers and provides refund anticipation loans. It is a subsidiary of the Green Dot Corporation.

Santa Barbara Tax Products Group is the second largest provider of tax refund-related products behind H&R Block Bank.

== History ==
Santa Barbara Tax Products Group was established in 2010 upon the sale of the Tax Products Business Unit of Santa Barbara Bank & Trust (SBBT), and was acquired by Green Dot Corporation in 2014.

== Products ==
Santa Barbara Tax Products Group processes tax refund-related financial products on behalf of University National Bank, servicing U.S. taxpayers through partnering tax professionals including Jackson Hewitt Tax Service, and online tax preparation software providers including TurboTax.
