= CNAF =

CNAF may refer to:

- Stadionul CNAF
- Caisse nationale des allocations familiales, see Caisse d'allocations familiales
- Chinese National Armed Forces, a former name of the Republic of China Armed Forces
- China National Aviation Fuel
- Commander, Naval Air Forces, United States Navy
- Commercial National Financial
- A division of Istituto Nazionale di Fisica Nucleare, in Bologna, Italy
