= Alex Blania =

Businessman and entrepreneur

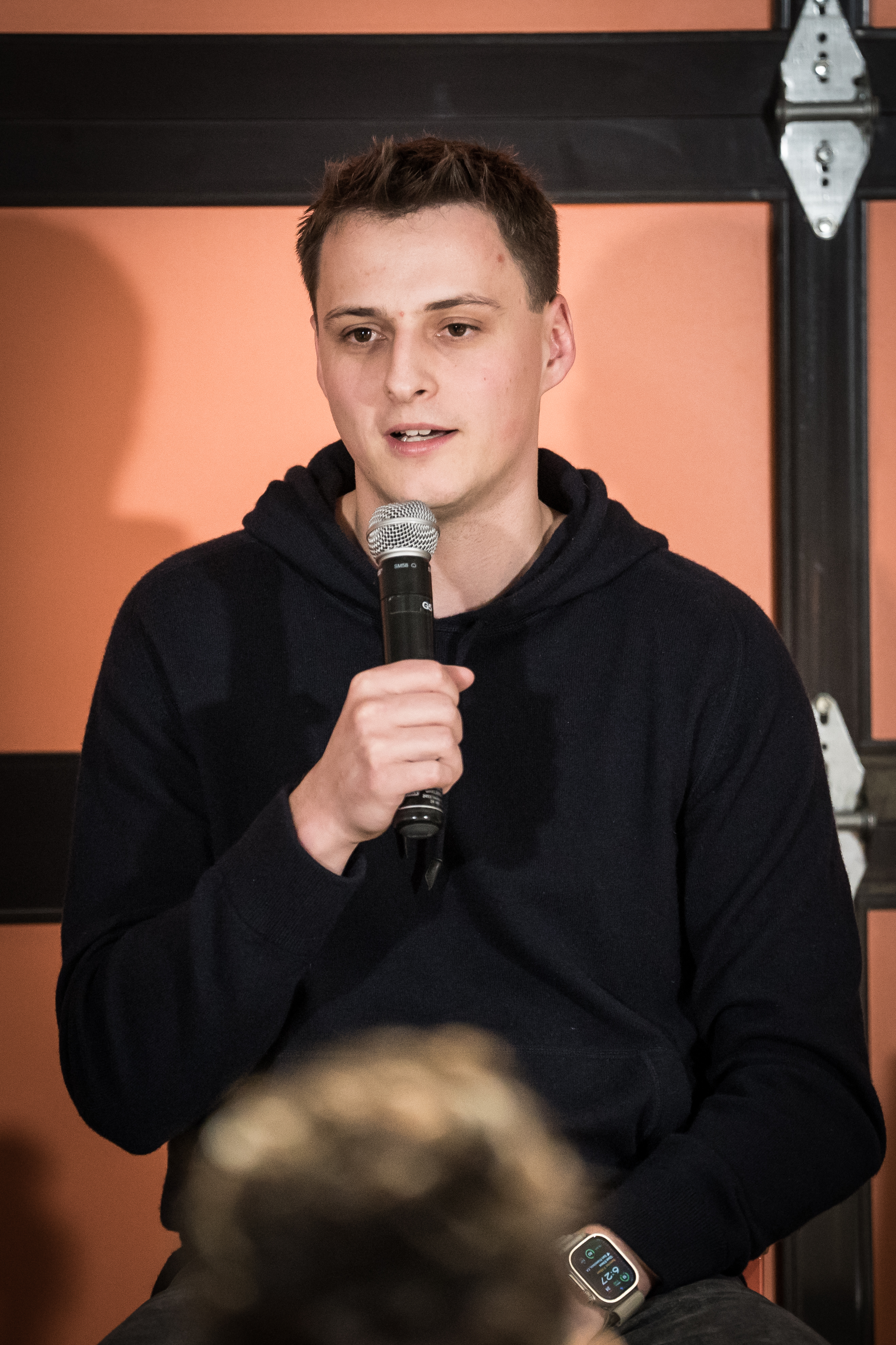
- Blania speaking in 2024
- Born: Circa 1994 (age 31–32)
- Education: Caltech; University of Erlangen-Nuremberg
- Title: CEO of Tools for Humanity; Co-Founder of Merge Labs; Co-Founder of World
- Website: https://www.alexblania.net

Alex Blania (born circa 1994) is an entrepreneur and technology executive, based in San Francisco, CA. He is CEO of Tools for Humanity, a technology company he co-founded, and co-founder of the related company World, where he is also CEO. Tools for Humanity has raised over $300 million in total funding at a valuation of approximately $3 billion. He is also a co-founder of Merge Labs together with Sam Altman and others, an AI company aiming to non-invasively connect human brains with computers. Merge Labs has raised a $252 million seed round at a $850 valuation with a large investment coming from OpenAI.

== Career ==
=== 2019: Founding World ===
Blania was interested in the Bay Area startup scene while doing research at Caltech, often driving to San Francisco to network. After applying to the startup incubator Y Combinator in 2019, he continued contacting venture funders, who introduced him to a number of executives in Silicon Valley. In October 2019, entrepreneurs Sam Altman and Max Novendstern emailed him with an offer to work with them on a new project, an international financial and identity network incorporating universal basic income. Blania was interested enough to leave Caltech and co-found both World and Tools for Humanity, World's parent company, in San Francisco. He became Worldcoin's CEO as well.

=== 2020-2023: Orb testing and launch ===
World had been developing a humanity verification system, and Blania began designing the hardware. The product, named the Orb, uses iris biometrics to confirm a user is unique and human. Beyond the Orb, Blania also began leading the company's development of the decentralized identity protocol World ID, and World App, which is a self-custodial cryptocurrency wallet. In March 2020, Blania traveled to Germany to continue the Orb's development. He hired a team to assemble the Orb in a new facility in Erlangen, and by the summer of 2021, they were field testing a prototype.

During a beta-testing period, World used the Orb device to register users in multiple countries, and World launched publicly in 2023. After the Kenyan government raised security concerns, in September 2023, Blania appeared in person before the National Assembly to defend the product’s safety. On Sep. 18, Kenya's Interior Minister Kithure Kindiki stated Kenyan authorities had attempted to detain Blania but had been blocked by US authorities. World responded that neither Blania or any of its employees had been detained. In 2024, after investigating the technology, Kenyan police confirmed they had closed the World investigations and wouldn't be pressing charges.

=== 2024-2026: Merge Labs, recent ===
In January 2024, Blania announced an update to the Orb device, at which point Tools for Humanity had raised around $250 million from investors such as Tiger Global Management and Andreessen Horowitz. In August 2025, he was named to the TIME list of the most 100 influential people in AI. Blania spoke at the 2025 IAPP Global Privacy Summit.

In August 2025, it was reported that Blania and Altman were co-founding Merge Labs, an AI company aiming to compete with Neuralink, by non-invasively connecting human brains with computers. The Financial Times reported it was seeking to fundraise an initial $250 million for a total valuation of $850 million, with Altman's OpenAI venture team expected to supply much of the startup funding.

== Early life and education ==
Born circa 1994, Alex Blania grew up in a rural town outside Nuremberg, Germany. His mother worked in accounting and finance, while his father worked as a consultant, sometimes stepping in as an interim CEO at various companies. Blania had an early interest in building things, as well as computer programming and electrical engineering. Among home projects were constructing a vertical farm, building an automated beetle counter to monitor forest health, and rebuilding an Austin Mini when he was 16.

Developing an interest in physics and AI, he earned a dual bachelors degree in physics and industrial engineering from the University of Erlangen-Nuremberg (FAU) in Erlangen, Germany, where he also was studying for a master's degree in physics. With the goal of becoming a theoretical physicist, he afterwards pursued a master's degree at Caltech's Max Planck Institute. Blania was involved in research projects specifically at the Max Planck Institute for the Science of Light. He also researched deep learning and AI in quantum computing at Caltech's Institute for Quantum Information and Matter.
