= IberiaBank =

Former American financial services company

IBERIABANK Corporation
- Formerly: Iberia Building Association (1887–1956); Iberia Savings and Loan Association (1956–1988); Iberia Savings Bank (1988–1997)
- Traded as: Nasdaq: IBKC
- Industry: Finance
- Founded: March 12, 1887; 139 years ago
- Defunct: July 2, 2020; 6 years ago
- Fate: Acquired by First Horizon National Corporation
- Successor: First Horizon Bank
- Headquarters: New Iberia, Louisiana (1887–2003); Lafayette, Louisiana (2003–2020)
- Number of locations: 192 (2020)
- Key people: Daryl G. Byrd (MBA president, CEO & Director)
- Products: Banking
- Revenue: ▲US$ 1.2 billion (core) (2018)
- Net income: ▲US$ 370.25 million (2018)
- Total assets: ▲US$ 30.8 billion (2018)
- Total equity: ▲US$ 3.90 billion (2018)
- Number of employees: 3,441 (2019)

IBERIABANK Corporation, stylized as IBERIABANK, was an American financial holding company headquartered in Lafayette, Louisiana, and the largest bank based in the state. Founded in 1887, it had 325 combined locations, including 190 bank branches and three loan production offices in 12 states primarily throughout the South. The company had 16 wealth management locations in five states, and one Iberia Capital Partners office in New Orleans.

IBERIABANK was an FDIC-insured institution regulated by the Office of the Comptroller of the Currency. On March 31, 2009, as the 2008 financial crisis came to an end, IberiaBank became the first financial institution in the country to repay its TARP funds to the Treasury.

In November 2019, IBERIABANK Corporation and Memphis, Tennessee–based First Horizon Bank agreed to merge. The combined bank is based in Memphis and uses the First Horizon name. The merger closed July 2, 2020.

== History ==
=== Foundations ===
The bank opened its doors on March 12, 1887, as a savings and loan association under the name Iberia Building Association. The name originates from New Iberia, Louisiana, which dates back to 1779 when Spanish colonists named their newly settled "Nueva Iberia" after the Iberian Peninsula. At the time the bank was founded, New Iberia was a farming community of about 3,000 people. Its principal industry was sugarcane farming, as the area's oil reserves, which would later spur population and economic growth, had yet to be discovered.

For its first 100 years, the bank's main functions were taking deposits and making home mortgage loans in the New Iberia community.

In 1956, Iberia Building Association changed its name to Iberia Savings & Loan (ISLA). Since savings and loan associations, or "thrifts," could not lend to businesses, ISLA was not affected by the oil crisis in the early 1980s like many Louisiana commercial banks were.

After regulations preventing thrifts from expanding eased in 1985, the bank absorbed several struggling thrifts during the 1980s oil glut. Branches opened in Morgan City and Franklin, Louisiana, moving the thrift beyond Iberia Parish for the first time. ISLA became Iberia Savings Bank (ISB) in 1988, and expansion continued the following year into Lafayette, Louisiana, with the acquisition of Acadia Savings & Loan.

Additional regulatory changes in the early 1990s permitted Louisiana savings and loan associations to become state-chartered commercial banks. Bank President Larrey Mouton prepared the company for this transition by forming the holding company ISB Financial Corporation and releasing an IPO on April 13, 1995.

Former IBERIABANK logo, used officially until 2007

In 1999, former Bank One executive Daryl Byrd took over as CEO, ushering in a period of rapid growth for the bank. With its new name IBERIABANK Corporation, the company would grow to acquire 24 banks since 2001.

When Hurricane Katrina hit the gulf coast in 2005, IberiaBank incurred hurricane-related expenses including loan losses associated with the storm, facility repairs and insurance deductible payments. Being a bank solely based in Louisiana, the organization decided to diversify its geographic footprint in the years following the storm to minimize risk. The bank expanded beyond Louisiana for the first time in 2007 with the purchase of Arkansas –based Pulaski Bank and Trust.

Spring of 2008 began a period of rapid growth fueled by accumulating the assets of failed banks due to the 2008 financial crisis. It began with the assumption of insured deposits from Arkansas-based ANB Financial, the third FDIC-insured bank to fail in 2008. The following year, IberiaBank assumed the assets and branches of Birmingham-based CapitalSouth, Orion Bank of Florida, and Century Bank of Florida. Its fifth and final FDIC-assisted transaction occurred late 2009 with the purchase of East Florida's Sterling Bank.

=== Mergers and Acquisitions ===
IBERIABANK footprint

The company had grown to acquire 24 other banks since 2001.

2003 - LBA Savings Bank (Lafayette, Louisiana)

2004 - Alliance Bank (Baton Rouge, Louisiana)

2005 - American Horizons Bank (Monroe, Louisiana)

2007 - Pulaski Bank and Trust Company (Little Rock, Arkansas); First Community Bank (Jonesboro, Arkansas)

2008 - ANB Financial (Bentonville, Arkansas)

2009 - CapitalSouth (Birmingham, Alabama); Orion Bank (Naples, Florida); Century Bank (Sarasota, Florida); Sterling Bank (Lantana, Florida)

2011 - Omni Bank (Metairie, Louisiana); Cameron State Bank (Lake Charles, Louisiana)

2012 - Florida Gulf Bank (Ft. Myers, Florida)

2014 - Trust One Bank (Memphis, Tennessee) from Synovus; Teche Holding Company (Lafayette, Louisiana); First Private (Dallas, Texas)

2015 - Florida Bank Group Inc. (Tampa, Florida); Old Florida Bankshares Inc. (Orlando, Florida); and Georgia Commerce Bankshares Inc. (Atlanta, Georgia)

2017 - Sabadell United Bank. (Miami, Florida);

2018 - Gibraltar Private Bank. (Miami, Florida)

In November 2019, IBERIABANK and Memphis, Tennessee-based First Horizon Bank agreed to a merger. The combined bank will be based in Memphis, and use the First Horizon name. The merger closed July 2, 2020. The combined bank has $79 billion in assets and $58 billion in loans.

2022 - On February 28, Toronto-based TD Bank announced that it would acquire First Horizon Corporation in an all-cash deal of $13.4 billion. TD will pay $25 per First Horizon share. The transaction was expected to be completed in February 2023 but was instead called off.

== Divisions and Subsidiaries ==
IBERIABANK Corp. was the holding company for IBERIABANK, its division providing consumer and commercial banking services, as well as mortgage lending and online banking services through VirtualBank.

IBERIABANK also has six active, wholly owned non-bank subsidiaries and divisions.

Iberia Capital Partners (ICP) was a subsidiary of IBERIABANK that performed equity research, institutional sales, trading, and investment banking. Its clients were institutional accounts, such as pension fund managers, mutual funds, hedge funds, and energy firms seeking financial advice.

Iberia Financial Services (IFS) offered securities and other financial products through Essex National Securities, Inc. (ENSI), a registered broker/dealer and member FINRA and SIPC. Additionally, IFS provided investment products and services, such as mutual funds, 529 plans, annuities, stocks, insurance, bonds, and retirement plans.

Iberia Wealth Advisors (IWA) was the trust and asset management division of IBERIABANK. IWA provided wealth management and trust services for high net worth individuals, their families, corporations, pension funds, foundations, endowments, and public and private institutions.

Lender's Title Group was a full-service title agency providing title insurance and closing services throughout Arkansas and Louisiana under the names Lenders title Company (Arkansas), United Title of Louisiana (Louisiana), American Abstract (Little Rock, Arkansas), and The Title Company (Baton Rouge, Louisiana). Lenders Title Company's title insurance products and closing services insured and facilitated residential home sales, home refinances, HELOCs, commercial property transactions, commercial financing, government land projects, and REO sales. The Lenders Title Company team was made up of title agents, escrow officers, legal professionals and support staff. Lender's Title was the largest independent title insurance company in Arkansas.

Mercantile Capital Corporation was a subsidiary of IBERIABANK which lent to small business seeking to acquire real estate and equipment using the SBA 504 Loan Program. Mercantile lent in all 50 states, Puerto Rico and the District of Columbia.
