= Mountain National Bank =

Mountain National Bancshares, Inc.
- Industry: Banking
- Founded: November 23, 1998; 27 years ago
- Defunct: June 7, 2013; 13 years ago
- Fate: Bank failure; acquired by First Tennessee
- Headquarters: Sevierville, Tennessee
- Key people: Michael L. Brown, President; Richard A. Hubbs, CFO
- Total assets: ▼$437.3 million (2013)
- Total equity: ▼ -$2 million (2011)
- Number of employees: 143 (2011)

Mountain National Bank was a bank headquartered in Sevierville, Tennessee. It was a subsidiary of Mountain National Bancshares, Inc., a bank holding company. The bank operated 12 branches in Sevier County and Blount County. In June 2013, as a result of bank failure, the bank was shut down by regulators and was sold to First Tennessee.

== History ==
The bank was founded on November 23, 1998.

In 2008, the bank had a 3.38% market share in East Tennessee.

In October 2011, the bank entered into a consent order with the Office of the Comptroller of the Currency (OCC) and agreed to reduce its commercial property loans.

In March 2012, Dwight Grizzell resigned as president and chief executive officer of the bank. In April 2012, the bank stated in a regulatory filing that there are matters that "give rise to substantial doubt" about the ability of the company to continue as a going concern.

In October 2012, James Friddell resigned as chief executive officer of the bank after only 6 months in the position.

On June 7, 2013, as a result of bank failure, the bank was closed by the OCC and put into receivership, with the Federal Deposit Insurance Corporation as receiver. Its branches were acquired by First Tennessee.
