= Steve Streit =

American business executive

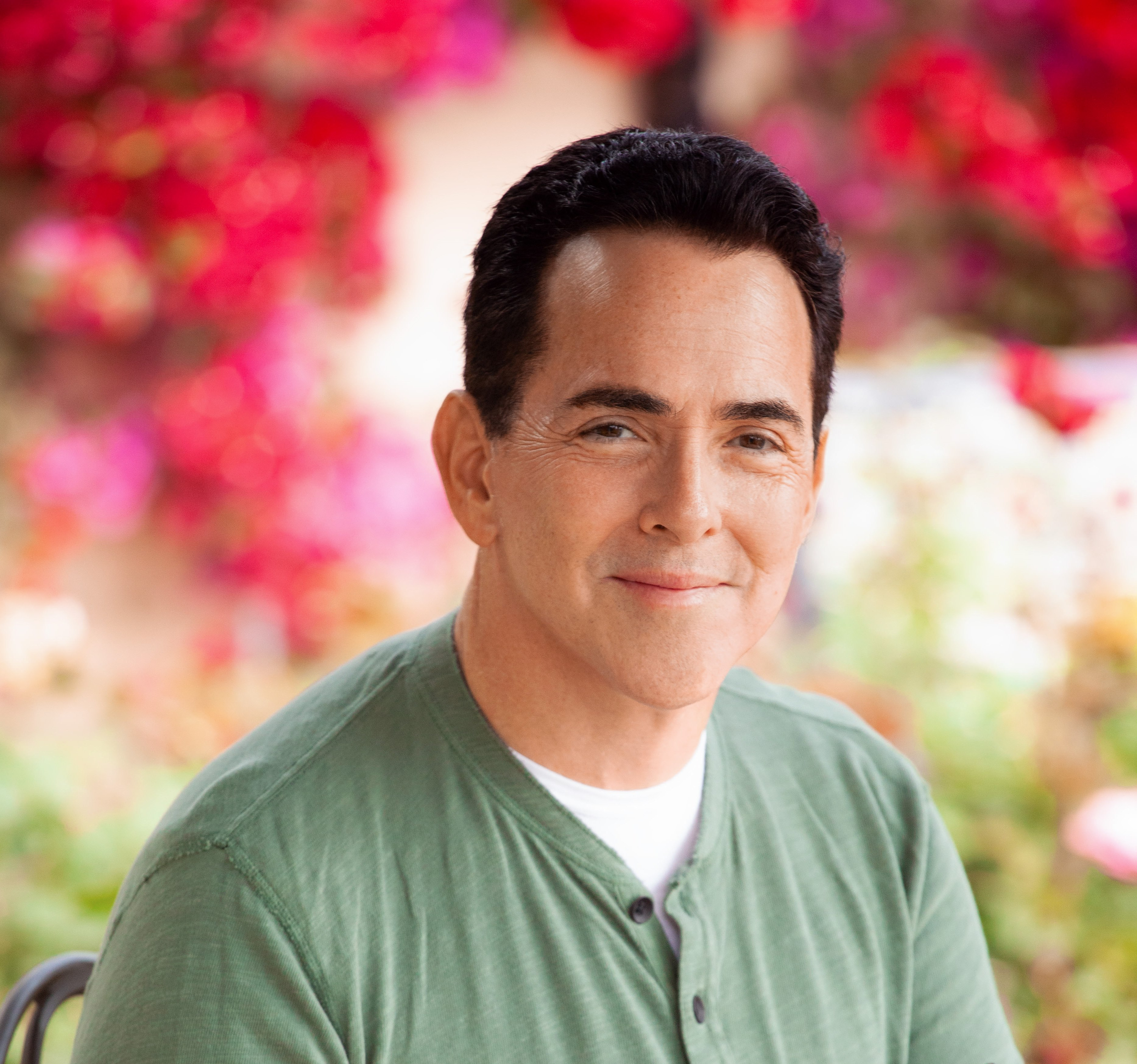
- Steve Streit
- Born: February 28, 1962 (age 64); North Miami, Florida, United States
- Education: University of Florida
- Occupation: Business executive
- Known for: Green Dot Corporation and SWS Venture Capital
- Website: www.swsventurecap.com

Steve Streit (February 28, 1962, in North Miami, Florida) is an American businessman known for founding Green Dot Corporation. He is also the founder and lead partner of SWS Venture Capital and a retired board member of the Federal Reserve Bank of San Francisco, Los Angeles Branch.

== Early life and education ==
Streit grew up in the city of North Miami, Florida. He attended the University of Florida, majoring in broadcast management, while working as a DJ.

== Career ==
In 1999, after leaving the broadcasting industry, he created the prepaid debit card, marketed as Green Dot, which was originally intended for teenagers to make purchases online, but quickly expanded to serve financially underserved Americans. In 2010, Green Dot Corporation became a public company, trading on the New York Stock Exchange under the symbol GDOT.

Streit also served on the board of the Federal Reserve Bank of San Francisco's Los Angeles branch and later founded SWS Venture Capital.

On December 31, 2019, Streit retired as CEO and Director of Green Dot Corporation.

=== Green Dot Corporation ===
Streit founded Green Dot Corporation in Pasadena, California. Green Dot provides MasterCard and Visa debit cards to consumers who could not otherwise get an account from a traditional bank. In 2002, Rite Aid became the first large retailer to sell Green Dot cards. By 2010, over 50,000 retail stores sold Green Dot products.

In 2004, Green Dot created the first "cash to debit card reload network," in which any prepaid card issuer could have their customers load money onto their debit card from any Green Dot retailer.

GoBank was launched nationwide to the public in 2013. It was the first bank account designed specifically to be used as a mobile app.

== Personal life ==
Streit lives in Naples, Florida. He has seven adult children.
