= Loopt =

US technology company

Loopt, Inc.
- Type: Private
- Industry: Geosocial networking, location-based services
- Founded: 2005; 21 years ago
- Founders: Sam Altman; Nick Sivo; Alok Deshpande
- Defunct: 2012
- Fate: Acquired by Green Dot Corporation
- Headquarters: Mountain View, California, US
- Key people: Sam Altman (CEO)
- Website: loopt.com at the Wayback Machine (archived 2008-12-16)

Loopt, Inc. was an American company based in Mountain View, California, which provided a service for smartphone users to share their location selectively with other people. The company entered partnerships with major U.S. mobile phone carriers including Verizon Wireless and Sprint-Nextel to include Loopt on their handsets and the service reached 4 million registered users in July 2010. In addition to its core features, users also had the ability to integrate Loopt with other social networks, including Facebook and Twitter.

The company was founded in 2005 and received initial funding from Y Combinator, and completed Series A and B financing led by Sequoia Capital and New Enterprise Associates. The company's board members included TiVo-founder Mike Ramsay and Greg McAdoo of Sequoia Capital. In March 2012 Loopt agreed to be acquired by Green Dot Corporation for $43.4 million in cash, with $9.8 million of that to be set aside for employee retention.

== History ==
Initially called Radiate, Loopt began with funding from Y Combinator. That summer, Stanford sophomores Sam Altman and Nick Sivo worked to build the first prototype of Loopt. They were later joined by Alok Deshpande as well as two of Sam's childhood friends, Rick & Tom Pernikoff.

Loopt received US$5 million in Series A funding from Sequoia Capital and New Enterprise Associates and struck a deal to launch the service on Boost Mobile devices in September 2006. Boost Mobile featured Loopt in a series of commercials that are most known for the "Where you at?" tag line.

In August 2007, Loopt expanded the service to select Sprint phones, and in June 2008, to Verizon. Loopt announced support for most GPS-enabled Blackberries on June 13, 2008. Loopt received US$8.25 million in Series B funding in July 2007.

In February 2008, Loopt and CBS partnered to deliver location-based advertising. Seven months later, Loopt released an opt-in feature in Loopt's iPhone application, called Loopt Mix, which uses location-based services to enable iPhone users to find and meet new people nearby.

At Apple's Worldwide Developers Conference in June 2008, Altman presented the Loopt application for the iPhone. Loopt for the iPhone became available to US customers of the Apple iTunes App Store on July 11, 2008.

In the summer of 2008, Loopt sponsored Black20's The Middle Show with host Dave Price.

In October 2008, Loopt was sued by Earthcomber for patent infringement. The case was dropped by Earthcomber in March 2009.

In October 2009, Loopt acquired Y Combinator-backed startup GraffitiGeo for an undisclosed sum.

In March 2010, Loopt launched an upgraded version of its iPhone app, incorporating place and event information to its Pulse database, bringing in content from ZVents, Metromix, and SonicLiving. These are added to existing content partnerships with Citysearch, Zagat, and Bing.

In March 2010, Loopt launched a product called Loopt Pulse, exclusively designed for the iPad.

In April 2010, Loopt launched an upgraded version of its BlackBerry app. The upgraded version includes the same places and events upgrade formerly launched in March 2010 for iPhone users.

August 2010 saw Steve Boom taking over as president of the company.

In December 2010, Loopt launched Loopt version 4.0, which featured a completely updated design.

In March 2012, after raising more than $30 million in venture capital, Loopt announced it had agreed to be acquired by Green Dot Corporation for US$43.4 million in a deal that was most likely orchestrated as a marriage of convenience by joint investor Sequoia Capital, with its products to be shut down at an unspecified date.

== SMS invitation issues ==
Users of Loopt had to register their mobile phone number, full name, and date of birth. Loopt's privacy notice stated that users could control who receives geo-location information via privacy settings.

When Loopt released its native iPhone application on July 10, 2008, the software quickly gained notoriety for sending Short Message Service (SMS) invites to users' address books, seemingly without the user's knowledge; additionally, the SMS service failed to respond to the industry-required STOP message.

On July 14, 2008, Loopt posted to its blog that the mass invites could be attributed to a confusing user interface, and they were working on an improved invitation flow. Respect for STOP was announced July 15, 2008, and on July 17, 2008, Loopt released an updated version which addressed the issues with the confusing user interface.

== See also ==
- Find My
- Life360
- Location awareness
- Mobile phone tracking
