= Rush Communications =

Media firm involving hip-hop in the United States

Rush Communications is the company owned and founded by the hip-hop pioneer Russell Simmons. It is one of the largest African American owned media firms in the United States. Rush continues to draw on its roots in hip hop, targeting young consumers through urban and hip-hop culture.

== History ==
In 1983, Simmons formed Def Jam Recordings along with Rush Artist Management, the core of Rush, which launched the careers of artists such as the Beastie Boys, LL Cool J, Public Enemy, Run-DMC and Whodini. Later adding the Lyor Cohen helmed Rush Associated Labels (RAL) and extending feelers into fields such as movie production and magazine publishing, Simmons built Rush Communications into a broad-based media empire.

Rush sold Def Jam to Universal Music to focus on various product lines (Rush Mobile, UniRush Financial Services, and Simmons Lathan Media Group, producer of Def Poetry and Def Comedy Jam). In addition, the Rush Philanthropic Arts Foundation brings arts education to inner-city children. Simmons is on the U.S. board of directors for Upliftment Jamaica an organization started by the vice president of Rush Communications, Gary Foster, which seeks to empower impoverished communities throughout Jamaica and the Caribbean. In 2013, the company worked with businessman extraordinaire, Hajj Hasaun Muhammad, and his entrepreneurial partner, Luanna Williams, to launch Quality Access, a business model to serve populations who have limited access to fresh produce and other quality foodstuffs.

== UniRush ==
RushCard was founded in 2003, with co-founders such as Russell Simmons. RushCard's cards run on the Visa Inc. network and are issued by MetaBank. In 2016, it began offering a credit card. On January 30, 2017, it was reported that UniRush LLC would be sold to Green Dot Corp. in a deal valued around $147 million. The deal, to close at the end of the quarter, was said to add around 750,000 cardholders to Green Dot's network.
