= Jack Altman (investor) =

American businessman and entrepreneur

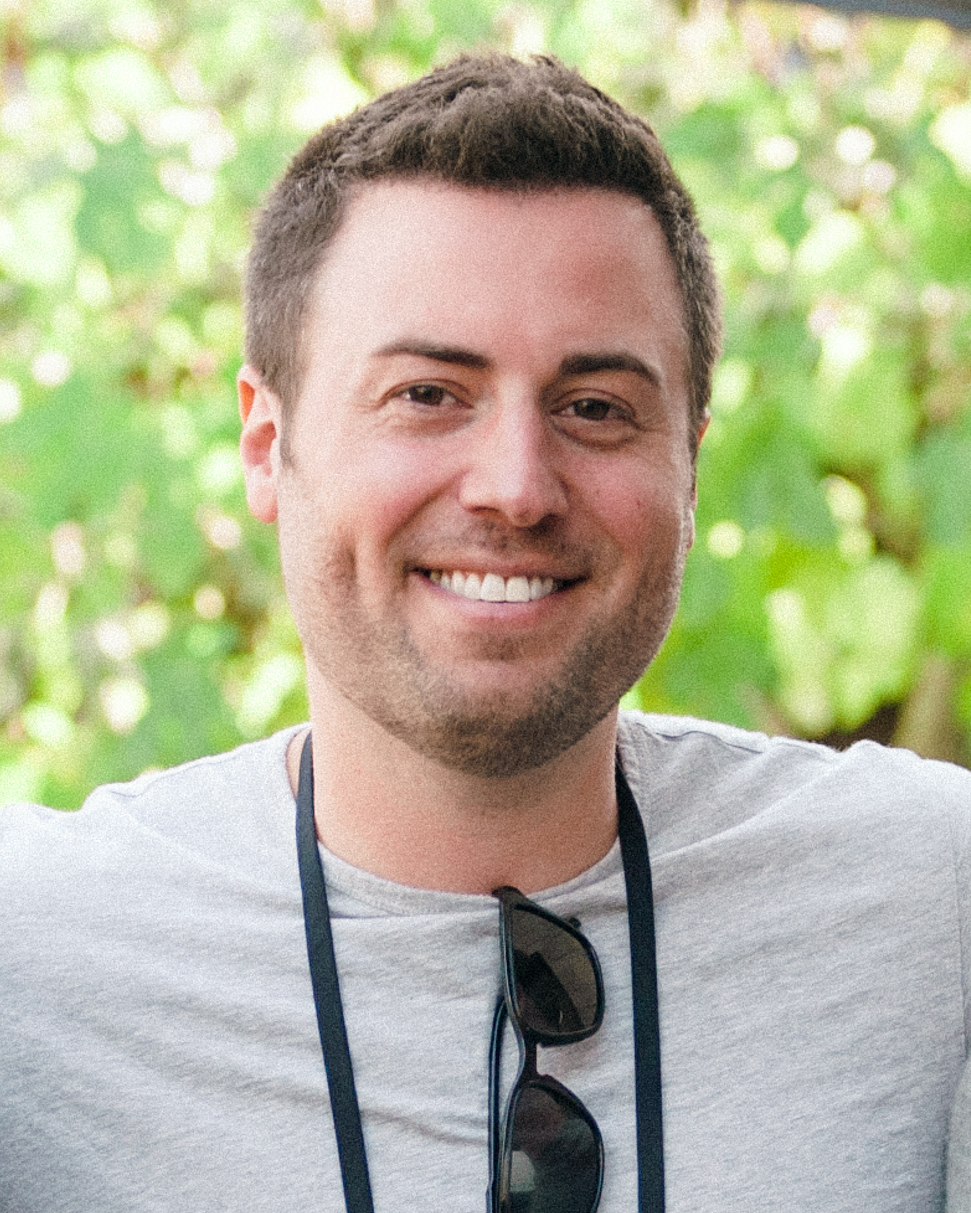
- Altman in 2022
- Born: 1989 or 1990 (age 36–37)
- Education: Princeton University
- Occupation: Partner at Benchmark
- Spouse: Julia Altman
- Children: 3
- Relatives: Sam Altman (brother)
- Website: jackealtman.com

Jack Altman is an American businessman, entrepreneur, author, and venture capitalist. He is a general partner with the venture capital firm, Benchmark. Previously, he was the founder and managing partner of Alt Capital, and Hydrazine Capital with his brother Sam. Until 2023, he served as CEO of Lattice, a human resources software company he co-founded.

== Early life ==
Altman grew up in Clayton, Missouri, in a Jewish American family, alongside Sam Altman and two other siblings. Through high school, he played water polo and participated in the rocketry club. Altman would go on to graduate from Princeton University in 2011, where he earned a bachelor of arts degree studying economics.

== Career ==
Altman began his career with Gleacher & Company, a New York-based investment banking firm, where he spent a year before moving to San Francisco, California. Following his move, Altman began investing in startups.

Altman spent time working for Teespring, eventually becoming its vice president of business development. He would quit this job to co-found his own company.

=== Lattice ===
In 2015, Altman co-founded Lattice, a human resources software company, with Eric Koslow. The company initially raised capital through Thrive Capital and Khosla Ventures. By 2022, Lattice reached a valuation worth $3 billion, and had clients like Reddit and Slack. In December 2023, Altman stepped down from his role as chief executive officer of Lattice, staying on as executive chairman, citing his want to return to early-stage company building. In 2024, he transitioned into becoming a full-time venture capitalist. During Altman's time working with Lattice, he advocated for the utilization of miscarriage leave, offering the same amount of time off as bereavement leave.

=== Venture capital ===
Following Altman's departure from Lattice, he founded the firm Alt Capital, where he was a solo partner, until the additions of Bala Chandrasekaran and Vivek Katara. In February 2024, Alt Capital raised a $150 million fund titled Alt Capital I.

Also in 2024, Alt Capital launched an accelerator for business software startups developing artificial intelligence technologies. Sam Altman served as a speaker and advisor for the program. As part of the program, Alt Capital, among nine other firms, had access to Microsoft's computing infrastructure, allowing portfolio companies to use its graphics processing unit clusters for training and running large language models for the purpose of developing AI features.

In September 2025, a $275 million fund was created through the firm, titled Alt Capital II. Limited partners in Alt Capital II include Cendana Capital, the University of Michigan, and TrueBridge Capital Partners, among others. As of September 2025, the firm's first fund, Alt Capital I, backed 20 startups, and Altman had taken five board seats.

Before establishing Alt Capital, Altman created two investment funds under the name Altman Capital. Through these funds, he invested approximately $100 million across around 100 deals. Sam Altman participated in some of those investments. Additionally, both Jack and Sam Altman had roles with Hydrazine Capital. Their brother, Max Altman, worked as an investor for Alt Capital.

Alt Capital has backed businesses such as Figma, Rippling, Flexport, Opendoor, Finch, and Durable. Owner.com, a business backed by Alt Capital saw growth from a $200 million valuation in 2024 to $1 billion in 2025. Legora, a legal AI startup, grew to a $675 million valuation less than a year after Alt Capital participated in its Series A round.

In February 2026, Altman became a general partner with Benchmark. As a result, Alt Capital II did not collect capital from investors, and the fund announced it would not make new investments, although Altman would retain his board seats in startups he had already backed. Other partners in Alt Capital joined Benchmark in unspecified roles.

In May 2026, Altman joined the board of sales software company Monaco, following Benchmark's investment in the company.

=== Other activities ===
In 2020, Altman served as an advisor for Apollo, a moonshot investment firm led by Sam Altman.

In 2021, Altman authored the book People Strategy: How to Invest In People and Make Culture Your Competitive Advantage, which became a Wall Street Journal best seller.

Altman hosts the podcast, Uncapped with Jack Altman, where he has interviewed guests like Sequoia Capital partners Alfred Lin and Pat Grady, and founder of Khosla Ventures, Vinod Khosla, and other entrepreneurs and investors.

== Bibliography ==
- People Strategy: How to Invest in People and Make Culture Your Competitive Advantage (2021) ISBN 9781119716945

== Personal life ==
Altman is married to his wife, Julia, with whom he has three children. He met her while in college at Princeton, where she was studying psychology.

Altman is the younger brother of OpenAI founder, Sam Altman. The brothers also have two additional siblings.

== Recognition ==
In 2019, Altman appeared alongside Lattice co-founder Eric Koslow on the Forbes 30 Under 30 list, under the category of Enterprise Technology.
