= Lyor Cohen =

American music industry executive

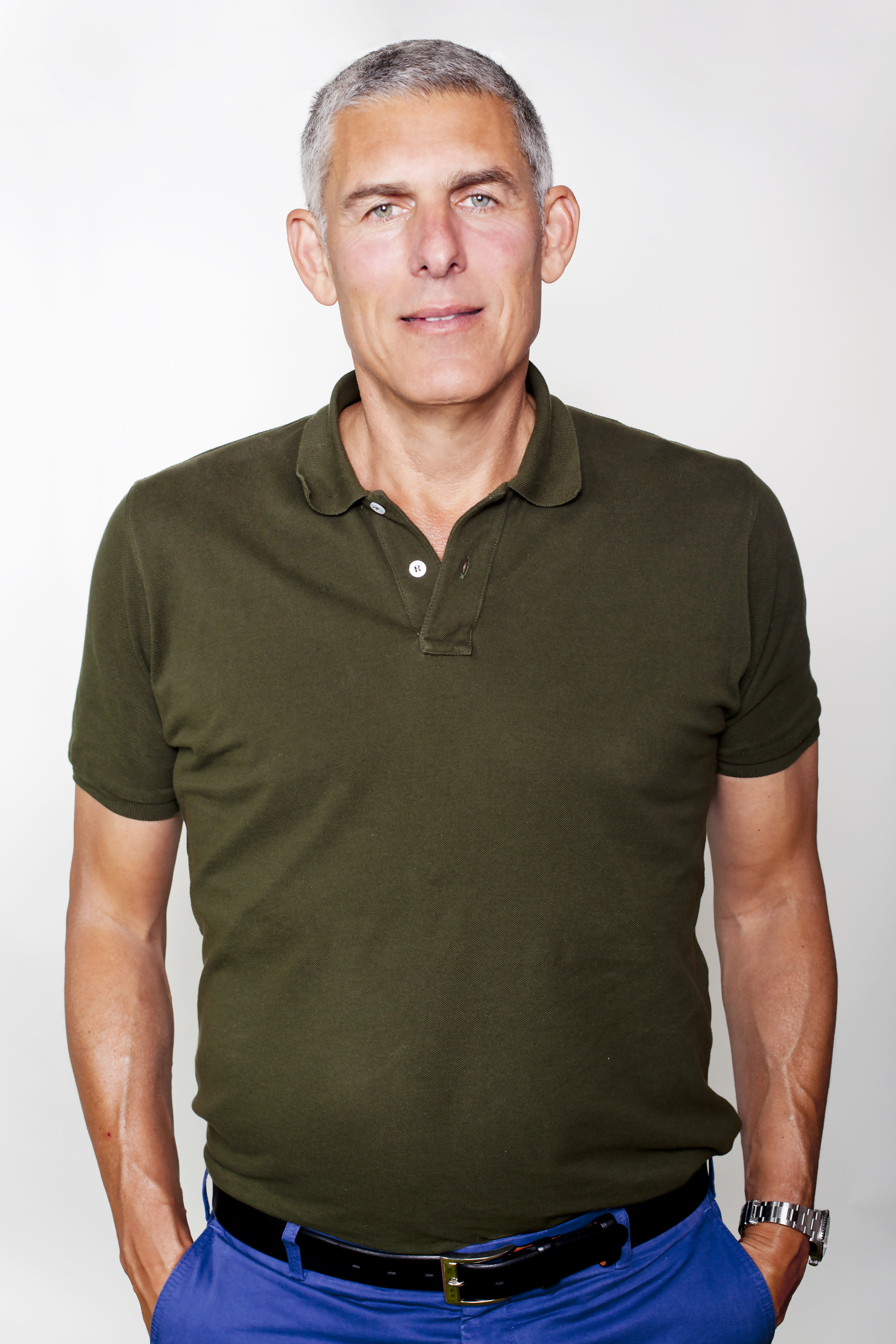
- Cohen in 2011
- Born: October 3, 1959 (age 67); New York City, U.S.
- Education: University of Miami (BBA)
- Occupation: Record executive
- Years active: 1980–present

Lyor Cohen (born October 3, 1959) is an Israeli-American record executive. He serves as global head of music at YouTube. Cohen began his career in the 1980s working with Russell Simmons at Rush Artist Management and later became president of Def Jam Recordings. He subsequently held senior leadership roles at The Island Def Jam Music Group and Warner Music Group, and later founded the music company 300 Entertainment.

== Early life and education ==
Cohen was born in New York City in 1959, while his parents were stationed at the Israeli consulate, then located in the Upper East Side of Manhattan.

Cohen's father, Elisha, worked in a security role at the Israeli consulate, and his mother, Ziva Sirkis, worked as an assistant to Abba Eban, Israel's first representative to the United Nations and ambassador to the United States. His parents met during the 1948 Palestine War, when Cohen's mother worked as a nurse, treating the injuries of Cohen's father, a soldier in the elite Palmach special forces unit of the Haganah paramilitary, fighting under the command of Yitzhak Rabin.

Cohen spent his early years in Israel, and later returned to the United States to attend John Marshall High School in Los Feliz, Los Angeles. In 1981, Cohen graduated from the Miami Herbert Business School at the University of Miami with a degree in global marketing and finance.

After graduating from university, Cohen's mother arranged for him to work in the Beverly Hills office of Bank Leumi, the national bank of Israel, assisting Iranian Jews emigrating from Iran after the Islamic Revolution in 1979 to move their assets out of Iran.

According to an investigation by Haaretz, Cohen's father allegedly organized the July 1984 attempted abduction of former Nigerian transport minister Umaru Dikko in London. Cohen's father cultivated contacts in the Nigerian military and boasted of ties to the Israeli intelligence organizations Mossad and Shin Bet. Haaretz reported that the Nigerian government paid Cohen's father roughly $5 million for his role in the operation, but the funds "disappeared," and Lyor and his brother Harel were unable to recover the money at the time of their father's death.

== Career ==
=== Rush Artist Management and Def Jam ===
In August 1984, Cohen threw a hip-hop party at the Stardust Ballroom on Sunset Boulevard. He borrowed $700 from his mother to book the rap group Run-DMC, the band Red Hot Chili Peppers, and rapper Ice-T. The event was a massive success, earning him $35,000 in a single night. Cohen later told Hits, "When I finally booked Run DMC, it cost me $350 and an eighth [of an ounce] of blow."

Cohen continued promoting concerts at The Mix Club in Hollywood, including crossover shows combining hip-hop and punk rock acts. He moved to New York City and joined Russell Simmons' company Rush Productions, later known as Rush Artist Management. Beginning as road manager for Run-DMC, Cohen worked with artists including Kurtis Blow, Whodini, Run-DMC, LL Cool J, the Beastie Boys, and Public Enemy.

Cohen was involved in the development and signing of artists including Slick Rick, DJ Jazzy Jeff & the Fresh Prince, Eric B. & Rakim, EPMD, Stetsasonic, De La Soul, and A Tribe Called Quest. He was mentored by Jam Master Jay.

In 1986 Cohen helped broker an endorsement deal between Run-DMC and Adidas, one of the earliest marketing partnerships between a hip-hop artist and an athletic company.

In 1988 he became president of Def Jam Recordings, which had been founded by Simmons and Rick Rubin in 1984.

=== Island Def Jam Music Group ===
In 1994 Cohen worked with Simmons to move Def Jam's distribution from Sony Music Entertainment to PolyGram.

After PolyGram merged with Universal Music Group in 1998, Def Jam was combined with Island Records, Mercury Records, and other labels to form The Island Def Jam Music Group. Cohen was appointed co-president.

During his tenure the company expanded beyond hip-hop and released music by artists including Bon Jovi, Mariah Carey, Ashanti, Nickelback, Slipknot, Sum 41, The Killers, Shania Twain, and Elvis Costello.

=== Warner Music Group ===
In 2004 Cohen joined Warner Music Group as chairman and chief executive of its recorded music division.

During his tenure he oversaw the merger of Atlantic Records and Elektra Records into the Atlantic Records Group and promoted executive Julie Greenwald, who later became chairman and chief operating officer of Atlantic.

Cohen resigned from Warner Music Group in September 2012.

=== 300 Entertainment ===
In 2013 Cohen co-founded 300 Entertainment, a music company combining label, marketing, and distribution functions. The company received backing from investors including Google and Atlantic Records.

=== YouTube ===
In September 2016 YouTube announced that Cohen would join the company as global head of music. He officially began the role in December 2016.

== Controversy ==
=== Murder Inc. Records raid ===
In January 2003 the offices of Murder Inc. Records at Island Def Jam were raided by the Federal Bureau of Investigation and the New York City Police Department as part of an investigation into alleged ties between label founder Irv Gotti and drug trafficker Kenneth McGriff.

In 2005 Gotti and Cohen were acquitted of all charges related to the investigation.

=== TVT Records lawsuit ===
In 2002 TVT Records filed a lawsuit against Cohen, The Island Def Jam Music Group, and Universal Music Group alleging fraud, tortious interference, breach of contract, and copyright infringement.

An initial jury award of $132 million was later overturned on appeal. TVT ultimately recovered $126,720 for breach of contract.

== Personal life ==
Cohen married his second wife, Amy, in 1990; the couple divorced in 2006.

He and his third wife, art consultant Xin Li, were married in 2016. She serves as deputy chairman of Christie's Asia.

Cohen serves on the boards of the Rock and Roll Hall of Fame and the National Independent Venue Association.
