= Keach Hagey =

American journalist and writer

- Education: Stanford University
- Occupations: Journalist, author
- Years active: 2003–present
- Employer: The Wall Street Journal
- Spouse: Wesley Harris
- Children: 3
- Website: keachhagey.com

Keach Hagey is an American journalist and non-fiction writer.

== Early life and education ==
Hagey grew up in Evansville, Indiana. She has a bachelor's and a master's in English literature from Stanford University.

== Career ==
Hagey is a media reporter at The Wall Street Journal where she covers the intersection and interplay between tech companies like Facebook and Google on one side and the media on the other. She has also covered OpenAI as well as 21st Century Fox, Time Warner, and Viacom for the Journal.

Hagey was part of a team at the Journal that won the George Polk Award and the Gerald Loeb Award.

At the Journal, Hagey covered media owners and executives including Sumner Redstone, Shari Redstone, Rupert Murdoch, Arianna Huffington, Katie Couric, Jeff Zucker, Jeff Bewkes, Shane Smith and Nancy Dubuc.

Prior to the Journal, she worked at Politico, CBS News, and The Village Voice. She interned for Wayne Barrett at The Village Voice.

Hagey was interviewed by NPR's Audie Cornish about Les Moonves, the former chairman and CEO of CBS Corporation.

She started her career with the Queens Chronicle.

== Books ==
Hagey is the author of a 2018 book about Sumner Redstone titled The King of Content: Sumner Redstone's Battle for Viacom, CBS, and Everlasting Control of His Media Empire. Hagey discussed the book in interviews with Brian Lamb of C-SPAN and with Peter Kafka on the Recode Media podcast.

In 2025, Hagey published a biography of Sam Altman titled The Optimist Sam Altman, OpenAI, and the Race to Invent the Future. James Ball reviewed the book for The Guardian. Tim Wu reviewed the book in The New York Times. Hagey spoke with Vanity Fair's then editor in chief Radhika Jones, then executive editor Claire Howorth, and then editor Michael Calderone about Altman's views, ambitions, and career.

== Personal life ==
Hagey is married to Wesley Harris. She met Harris while interning at The Village Voice. They have three children and live in Irvington, New York.
