= World (blockchain) =

Cryptocurrency project

Denominations
- Code: WLD

Development
- White paper: whitepaper.worldcoin.org
- Developer: Tools for Humanity

Website
- Website: world.org

Tools for Humanity
- Type: Private
- Founded: 2019; 7 years ago
- Founders: Sam Altman; Max Novendstern; Alex Blania
- Headquarters: San Francisco and Munich
- Key people: Sam Altman (chairman); Alex Blania (CEO)
- Products: Orb; World App
- Number of employees: 400 (2025)
- Website: toolsforhumanity.com

World, also known as World Network, is a humanity verification project and financial network. It was developed and launched as the cryptocurrency project Worldcoin. Among other organizations, contributors to the project include Tools for Humanity, a company founded in 2019 by Sam Altman, Max Novendstern, and Alex Blania. World's stated mission is to provide a reliable and anonymous way to authenticate humans online, which it calls World ID. After accumulating $250 million in funding from venture capital firms such as Andreessen Horowitz, it launched out of beta in 2023. The project was rebranded as World in 2024, at which point it had partnerships with the governments of Taiwan and Malaysia concerning digital identity verification. To join the network, new users complete biometric verification by the company's Orb hardware, with users in some locales then receiving Worldcoin (WLD), a digital token. This collection process has caused privacy concerns in multiple countries.

== History ==
=== Founding and beta (2019–2023) ===
World, originally called Worldcoin, is a project started by OpenAI chief executive Sam Altman, Max Novendstern, and Alex Blania and based in San Francisco and Munich. Developed by the private company Tools for Humanity (TFH) in 2019, World outlined a three-part mission to create a global ID, a global currency, and an app enabling payment with World's own digital token as well as other digital assets and fiat currencies. It began developing World ID, an open-source protocol it describes as a digital passport for confirming someone is a unique human. The project also began developing the cryptocurrency token WLD, or Worldcoin. It described WLD as part of a larger effort to drive a more unified and equitable global economy, with the token to be a Layer 2 Ethereum-based cryptocurrency that leverages the security of the Ethereum blockchain while having its own economy. In October 2021, the project raised an initial $25 million by investors such as Andreessen Horowitz. Within six months, an additional $100 million was raised, pushing the token's total value up to $3 billion. Ten percent of all WLD tokens were reserved for World investors, while another 11.1 percent were reserved for employees at contributing organizations.

While in beta mode, by March 2022, World had verified 450,000 individuals in 24 countries using its Orb technology, using the data for training its algorithms. World uses "operators" to sign up new users, with these independent contractors paid per sign-up in Worldcoin. After joining World's network, new users are given WLD tokens, a distribution mechanism World states was inspired by universal basic income discussions. In order to access their WLD, users provide an email address or phone number and use the World app. In April 2022, the MIT Technology Review reported that World's recruitment efforts included lower-income communities, and quoted a Nairobi student stating World was "taking advantage of students" via unclear disclosure of risk. The article concluded "it's just cheaper and easier to run this kind of data collection operation in places where people have little money and few legal protections." World was reported in May 2023 to have onboarded approximately two million users in 33 countries. That month, TechCrunch reported hackers had stolen login credentials of several of World's operators' personal devices including their credentials to the World operator app. However, a company spokesperson said that no personal user data was compromised, as the operator app has no access to user data. Further funding of $115 million was announced in May 2023, to be used for investment into bot detection, research and development, and expanding World applications. By July 2023, they had $250 million in funding from venture capital firms Andreessen Horowitz and Khosla Ventures, as well as Reid Hoffman.

=== Official launch (2023–2025) ===
World launched out of beta on July 24, 2023 with 11 orb locations in the U.S. and plans for 35 cities in 20 countries. WLD tokens became freely tradable on several cryptocurrency exchanges, though not in the U.S. Users in locations such as London received WLD tokens for being verified. In May 2024, World switched its data storage to a secure multi-party computation (MPC) encryption method, stating the move was part of its efforts to comply with the EU's General Data Protection Regulation. According to World, after stored iris codes were migrated to their new SMPC system, the old codes were then deleted. In September 2024, World introduced the facial comparison program Face Auth, a competitor to Apple's Face ID software. In October 2024, World launched a new edition of Orb, its eye-scanning hardware. It also launched Deep Face, an anti-deepfake feature for users with World IDs. By late 2024, World had partnerships with Taiwan and Malaysia concerning digital identity verification. World was also looking into verifying users with passports instead of iris verification.

Worldcoin was rebranded as World Network in October 2024. In January 2025, World's chief product officer said the company was looking into World ID being used to license AI agents to act on a World user's behalf. Also in early 2025, Razer began incorporating World ID to facilitate "human-only" modes or servers in games, cutting out bots. 25 million people were on the World network by February 2025. In April 2025, the World App enabled a private chat feature allowing users to send messages and tokens. Also that month, World announced its Worldcoin (WLD) tokens would become available in most of the United States, and be available on exchanges such as Coinbase. World launched its operations in the USA on May 1, 2025, with locations in Atlanta, Austin, Los Angeles, Miami, Nashville, and San Francisco, and Razer stores. It also announced an upcoming debit card project with Visa and partnered with Match Group, which owns dating apps such as Tinder. As of September 2025, World had approximately 33 million World App users, of which 15 million were verified. As of 2025, Altman was the chairman of Tools for Humanity and Blania was the CEO.

== Design ==
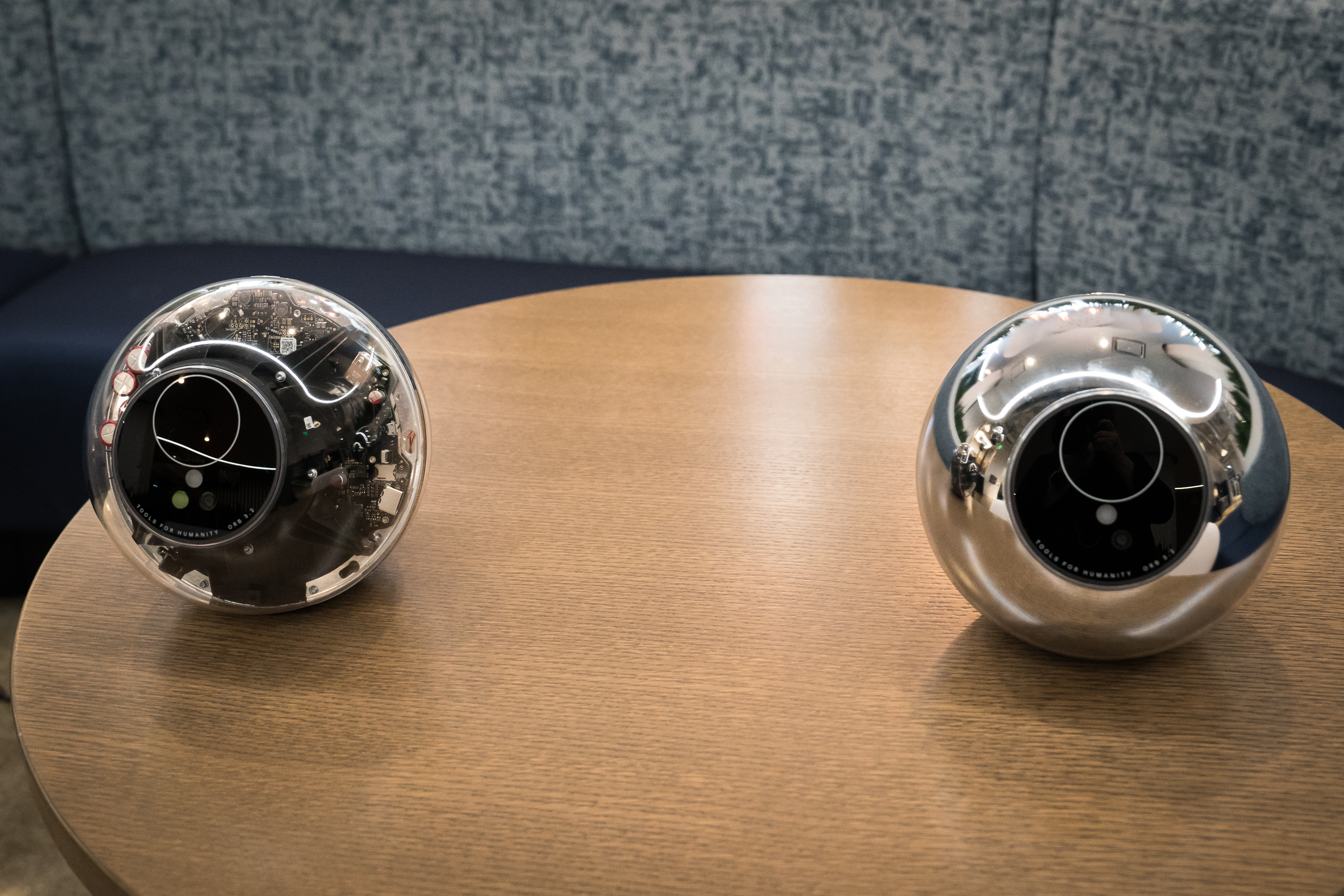
Orb-shaped iris scanners on display

World hopes to provide a reliable way to authenticate humans online via World ID accounts, to counter bots and fake virtual identities facilitated by artificial intelligence. In 2025, World's website featured several products: its Worldcoin digital token, its World Chain blockchain, its World App portal, and its anonymous "proof of human" World ID.

To create a user's World ID, a device called the Orb takes images of a user's face and eyes to confirm they are unique and human. According to Tools for Humanity, iris codes are used because irises have more randomness and complexity than fingerprints or faces, and are also less susceptible to change. After biometrics are verified, World states the "data is encrypted, sent to [the user's] phone and permanently deleted from the [Orb device]," and a unique identifier is created to represent the user on the World blockchain.

== Legal and regulatory issues ==
The currency has been suspended, formally investigated, or delayed in multiple countries because of concerns by national regulators regarding privacy and potential use of the cryptocurrency tokens for fraud.

In July of 2023, the data protection authorities in both France (CNIL) and the United Kingdom (Information Commissioner's Office) announced they had opened investigations into World over privacy concerns. In addition, regulators in Bavaria and South Korea also announced they had opened investigations.

In 2023, World also stopped offline verifications in India and suspended operations in Brazil. In August 2023, Kenya, one of the first countries where World was launched, suspended its enrollment in the country, citing security, privacy and financial concerns. World was previously ordered to stop collecting personal data by the Kenyan Office of the Data Protection Commissioner, but did not comply. In June 2024, the Kenyan Directorate of Criminal Investigations dropped the investigation, allowing operations to resume. However, in May 2025, Kenya ordered World to delete all biometric data it had collected in the country.

In late January 2024 representatives of the Hong Kong Office of the Privacy Commissioner for Personal Data executed warrants on six World premises in Hong Kong, some of which had been used for user verification. The commissioner's office expressed concern the verification process carried the potential for abuse of personal information. On 22 May, the commissioner's office found World's data collection process had violated the Personal Data (Privacy) Ordinance.

On March 6, 2024, the Spanish Data Protection Agency (AEPD) ordered World to stop its activity of "collection of biometric data" and to "block all data collected in Spanish territory". It ordered a three-month suspension using Article 66 of the General Data Protection Regulations. World unsuccessfully sought an injunction from the High Court in Madrid to prevent the order coming into effect. On March 26, 2024, the Portuguese data protection authority—CNPD—made a similar temporary order to prevent data collection over concerns including the inability to withdraw consent, "deficiencies in the information provided to the data subjects" and the collection of data from minors.

In May 2025, Indonesia's Ministry of Communication and Digital Affairs temporarily suspended the operations of the project following public complaints over suspicious activities. Two local operators were to be summoned to clarify their operations due to potential violations of Indonesia's electronic system regulations.

In October 2025, the Philippines' National Privacy Commission (NPC) issued a cease and desist order against Tools for Humanity for multiple violations of the Data Privacy Act of 2012 and related regulations. The order directed TFH to immediately stop all collection and processing of personal data in the Philippines, including the use of iris scans. The NPC found that TFH obtained invalid consent by offering monetary incentives for biometric registration, failed to provide sufficient transparency about how user data would be collected and processed, and gathered biometric information beyond what was necessary for to verify a user's "proof of humanity". It ruled that these posed risks of identity theft, fraud, and reputational harm, and noted similar suspensions of the World app in other countries. The NPC also rejected TFH's claims that it had implemented safeguards such as encryption and temporary data capture, stating that these measures failed to comply with Philippine data protection standards. World Philippines disputed the NPC's findings, calling it a "setback for responsible digital innovation". The company claimed that it had completed a year-long compliance process, including registration with the NPC and participation in the Department of Information and Communications Technology's Sandbox Program. It maintained that its system verifies "proof of humanity" without storing personal information and that biometric data are processed locally and deleted within seconds. World said it would file a motion for reconsideration while continuing to cooperate with regulators.

In November 2025, the Personal Data Protection Committee of Thailand ordered the service to halt its iris scan service and delete the data collected from 1.2 million people to prevent possible illegal transfers overseas.
