= First Horizon Bank =

American financial services company

First Horizon Corporation

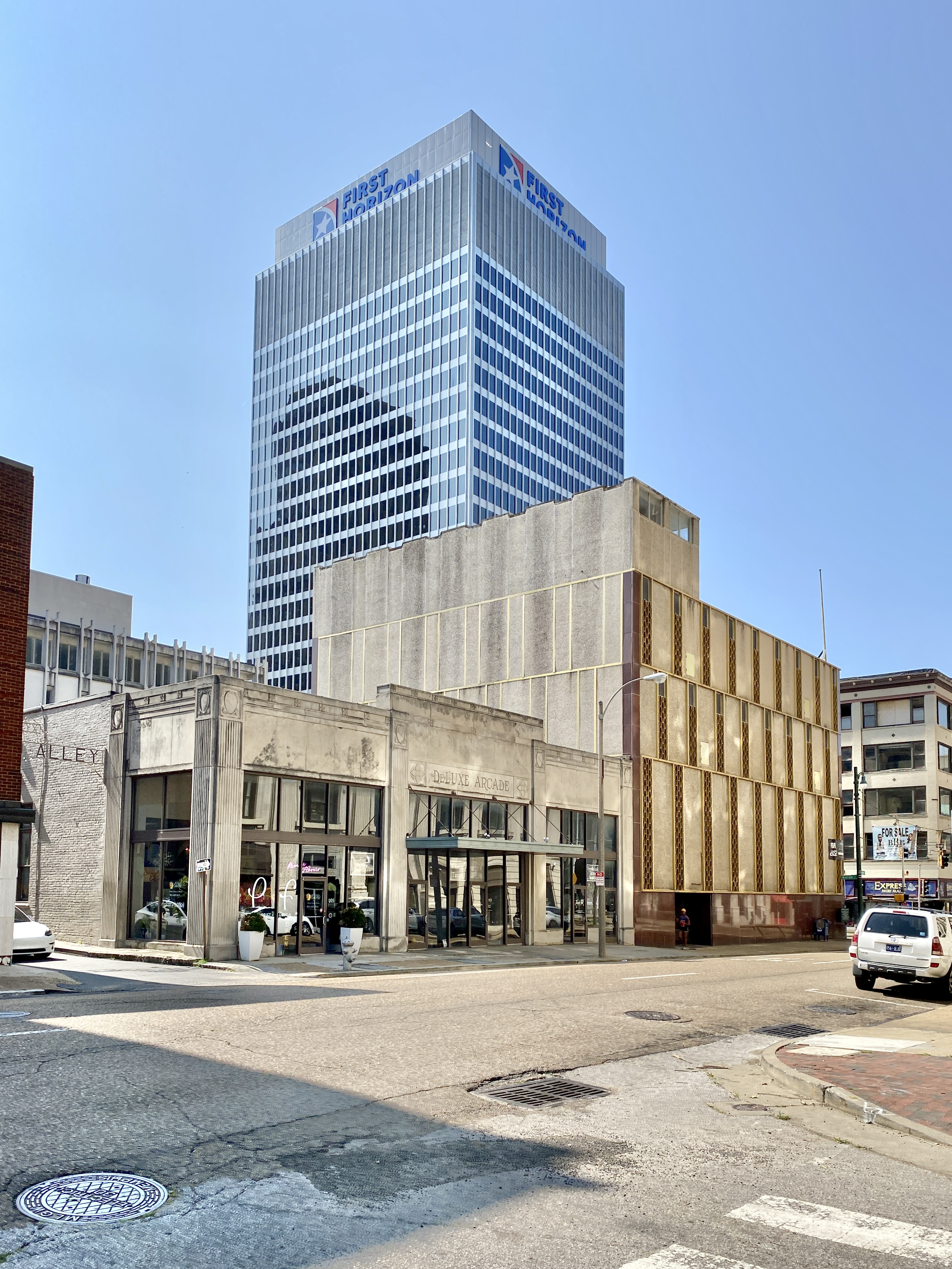
- First Horizon Bank Tower in Memphis, Tennessee
- Formerly: First National Bank of Memphis (1864–1977); First Tennessee Bank (1977–2019)
- Type: Public
- Traded as: NYSE: FHN; S&P 400 component
- Industry: Financial services
- Founded: March 25, 1864; 162 years ago
- Founder: Frank S. Davis
- Headquarters: Memphis, Tennessee, U.S.
- Key people: Bryan Jordan (president and CEO); Hope Dmuchowski (CFO)
- Net income: ▲US$198 million (2022)
- Total assets: ▲US$88.7 billion (2022)
- Total equity: ▲US$8.7 billion (2022)
- Number of employees: 7,600 (2022)
- Website: firsthorizon.com

First Horizon Corporation, formerly First Tennessee Bank, is a financial services company, founded in 1864, and based in Memphis, Tennessee. Through its banking subsidiary First Horizon Bank, it provides financial services through locations in 12 states across the Southeast, a region in which it is the fourth largest regional bank.

In November 2019, First Horizon Corporation and IberiaBank Corporation agreed to merge, closing in July 2020. The combined bank is based in Memphis, Tennessee, and uses the First Horizon name.

The bank gained national attention during the 2023 banking crisis, in which multiple regional banks across the United States as well as the Swiss institution Credit Suisse all collapsed and were bought out. First Horizon's stock price began to plummet in the wake of both a merger with Toronto-Dominion Bank being called off and the collapse of First Republic Bank in San Francisco.

== History ==
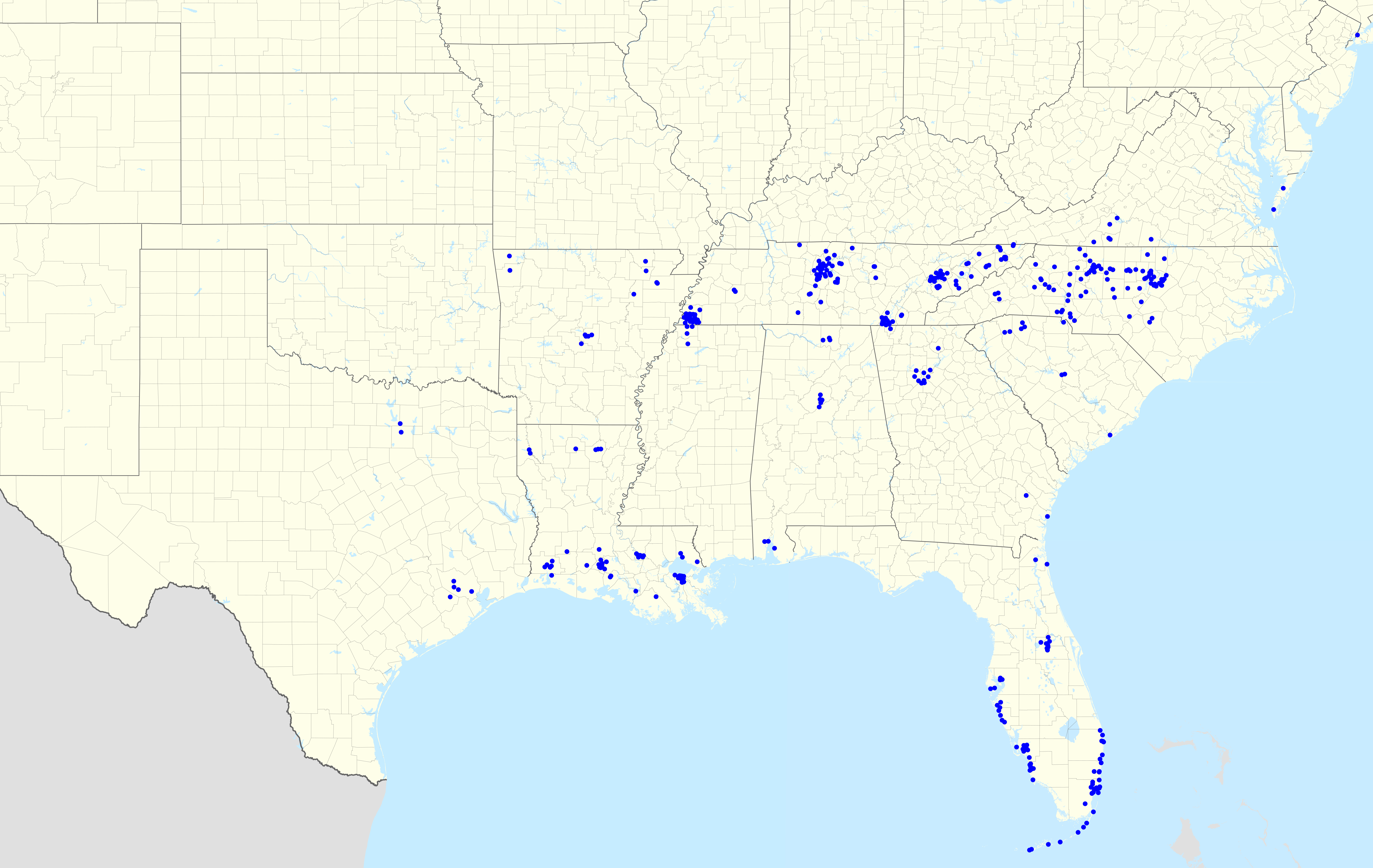
First Horizon Bank branches as of February 2026

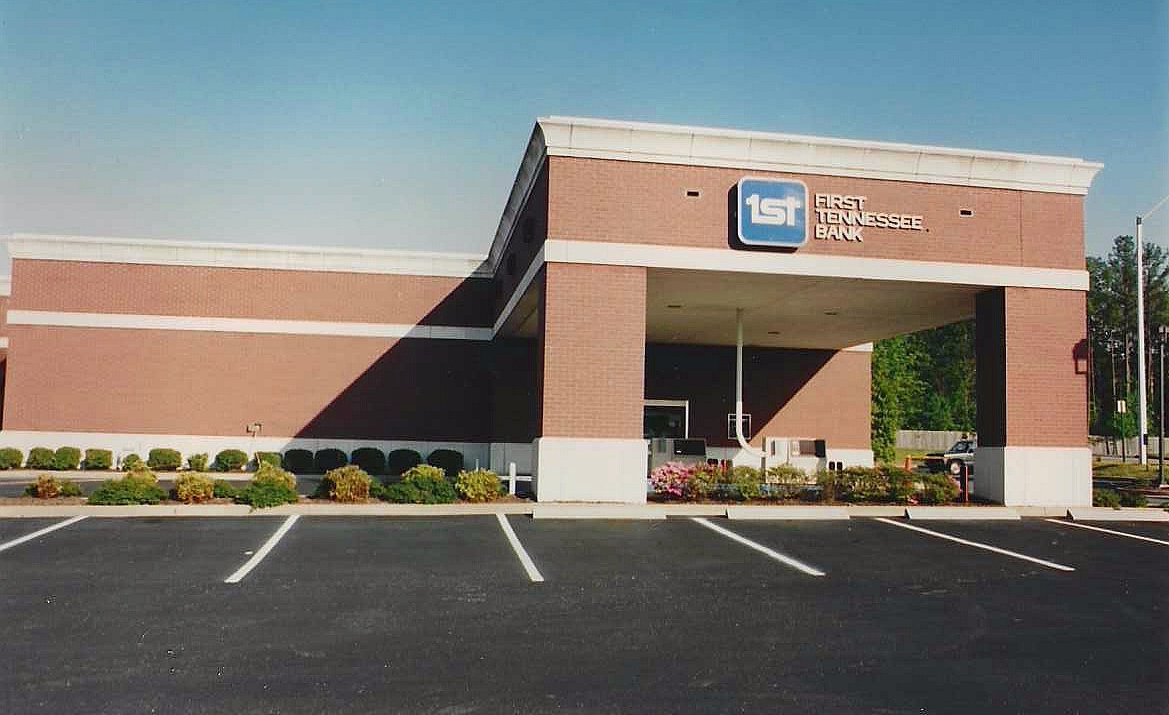
Exterior of a First Tennessee Bank taken in 1995 in Athens, TN

Frank S. Davis founded First National Bank, the first nationally chartered bank in Memphis, after passage of the National Banking Act of 1863. Though the city was under martial law after being captured by Union forces in the Civil War, First National Bank of Memphis was officially chartered for business on March 25, 1864, during the American Civil War.

The bank acquired German Bank in 1895. First National was one of five banks in the twelve districts to help implement the Federal Reserve Act of 1913, and in 1914, the bank participated in the organization of the Federal Reserve Bank of St. Louis. The bank merged with Central-State National Bank in 1926. The merged bank retained First National's name and charter, but was led by Central-State's management team.

In 1942, the bank opened its first suburban branch and by 1952, First National had seven offices. In 1961, a 25-story tower was announced. As of 1967, First National was the largest bank in the Mid-South. A holding company, First National Holding Corporation, was created in 1969. Two years later, because leadership intended to acquire other banks, this became First Tennessee National Corporation. The corporation acquired five banks in 1972 and changed their names to First Tennessee Bank. (Allen B. Morgan had been named president in 1960, chief executive in 1967, and chairman in 1969, retiring in 1973.) In 1977, First National also became First Tennessee Bank.

During the 1980s, the company expanded into mortgage brokerage, mortgage loan origination, and insurance. In 1981 First Express became the first national check-clearing service, and First Tennessee offered brokerage services starting the next year.

In 1993, the bank acquired MNC Mortgage.

In 1994, the bank acquired Peoples Commercial Services Corporation.

In 1995, with the purchases of Maryland National Mortgage Corporation and SNMC Management Corporation, First Tennessee had $6 billion in mortgage origination and was one of the country's top 10 mortgage originators.

In 1999, to reflect its diversification, the bank adopted the slogan, "All Things Financial."

In 2004, the company changed its name to First Horizon National Corporation to reflect its interstate growth.

In May 2007, the company acquired Republic Mortgage, based in Las Vegas.

In September 2007, the company sold 34 branches outside of Tennessee, including 13 branches to M&T Bank, 10 branches to Sterling Bank, 9 branches to Fifth Third, and 2 branches to FMCB Holdings.

In June 2008, the company sold its residential-mortgage origination and servicing business to Metlife.

In November 2008, the United States Department of the Treasury invested $866 million in the company as part of the Troubled Asset Relief Program and in December 2010, the company repurchased the investment from the Treasury.

Logo of First Tennessee prior to rebranding to First Horizon.

Across the 2010s, First Horizon acquired three regional banks, starting in 2013, when it acquired the failing Mountain National Bank. First Horizon acquired TrustAtlantic in 2015 and Capital Bank Financial in 2017. In 2019, First Horizon merged with IberiaBank to create a bank with $79 billion in assets and $58 billion in loans. Also in 2019, First Horizon announced it was going to rebrand all of its services under the same First Horizon name. The change encompassing First Tennessee Bank, Capital Bank, FTB Advisors and FTN Financial became effective at the close of business on October 25, 2019, with signage changes expected to be complete throughout those holdings by early 2020.

On July 20, 2020, First Horizon National Corp acquired 30 branches from SunTrust bank, now Truist. The transaction added $410 million in loans and $2.3 billion in deposits. The branches were converted to First Horizon banking centers over the weekend of July 17-19, 2020.

On February 28, 2022, Toronto-based TD Bank Group announced that it would acquire First Horizon Corporation in an all-cash deal of $13.4 billion in what would have been the second-largest bank deal in recent U.S. history. On May 4, 2023, the companies announced that the acquisition would not proceed citing regulatory uncertainties, with TD owing First Horizon a total of $225 million in break-up fees as part of the termination agreement. The merger's call off happened within the same week as the collapse and buyout of First Republic Bank by JPMorgan Chase, and the bank's financial failures are seen as part of the 2023 banking crisis. Reports of First Horizon's call off were paired with the news of PacWest Bancorp itself heading on a lifeline.

== Consumer and business banking ==
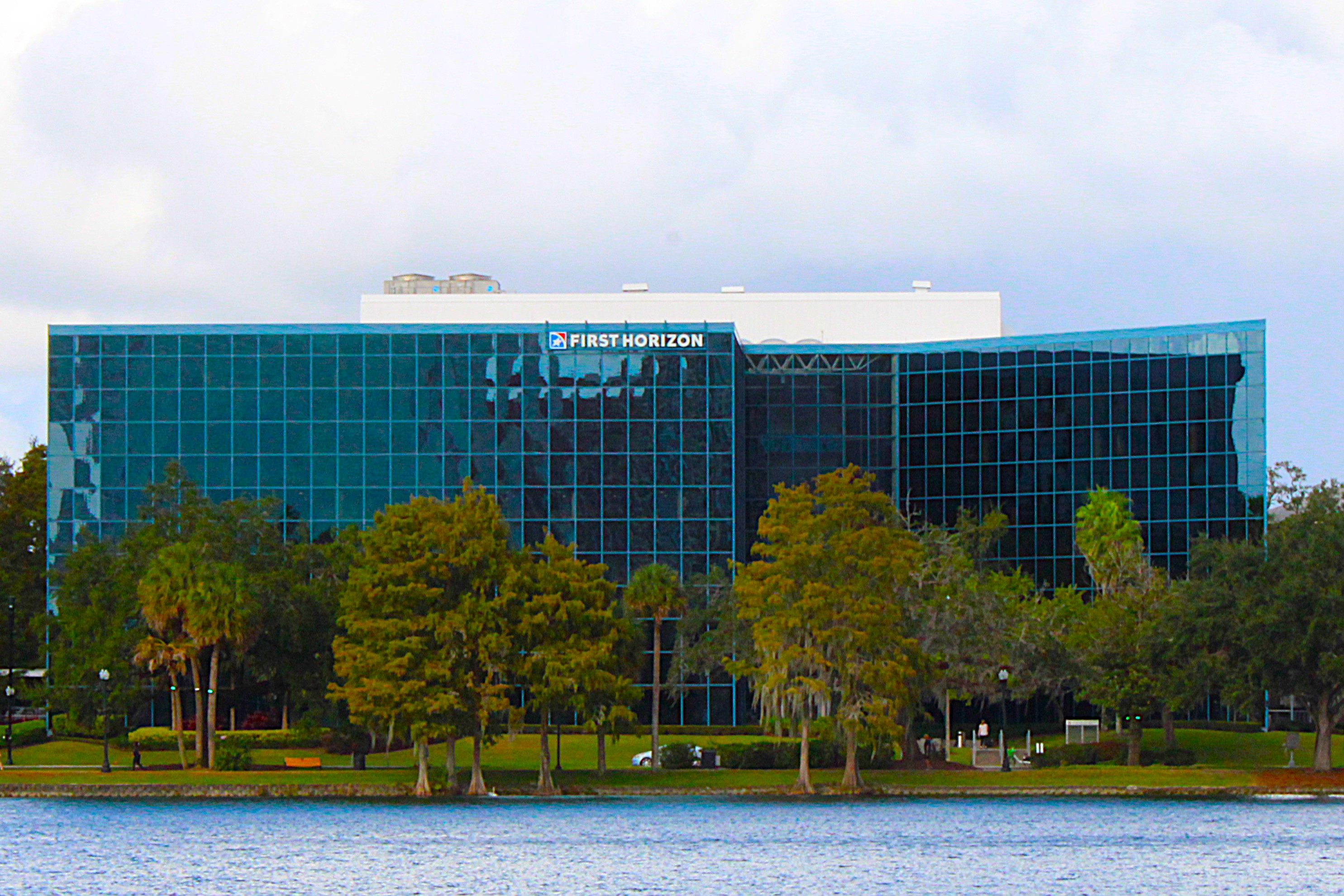
A First Horizon Bank in Orlando, FL

On October 11, 2016, First Tennessee announced the opening of its first Piedmont Triad retail branch in Winston-Salem. The bank had offered commercial banking and real estate and wealth-management services in the city since 2004. From 2003 to 2016, Winston-Salem was also the headquarters of the Mid-Atlantic Region, including the Triangle, Charlotte and Greenville in North Carolina; Richmond in Virginia; Charleston in South Carolina; and Jacksonville in Florida. The new regional headquarters was in Raleigh, where First Tennessee had four branches after buying TrustAtlantic Bank in 2015.
