= Commercial National Financial =

Commercial National Financial Corporation
- Company type: Public
- Traded as: OTCQX: CNAF
- Industry: Financial services
- Founded: 1934; 92 years ago
- Headquarters: Latrobe, Pennsylvania, United States
- Key people: Howard Poindexter (chairman); Jeffrey Barker (CEO)
- Operating income: ▲US$ 15,468 million (2012)
- Net income: ▲US$ 7,265 million (2012)
- Total assets: ▲US$ 373,062 million (2012)
- Total equity: ▲US$ 52,766 million (2012)
- Website: cnbthebankonline.com

Commercial National Financial Corporation is a registered financial holding company under the Bank Holding Company Act of 1956 as amended. The company wholly owns Commercial Bank & Trust of PA under the Bank Holding Company Act. The company's principal business is the operation of Commercial Bank & Trust of PA, which offers various commercial banking and trust services including deposit services, financial counseling, investing, and extending credit. Commercial National Financial Corporation uses CNAF as the trading symbol on the OTCQX tier of the OTC Markets.

== History ==
In May 1934, Commercial Bank & Trust of PA was established in the Latrobe office of the former Peoples National Bank. Today, the company still uses this building as administrative headquarters and the main retail office.

In 2008, the corporation entered into a stock purchase agreement with the shareholders of Ridge Properties Inc. to purchase Ridge Properties Inc, a Pennsylvania corporation whose asset is Commercial National Financial Corporation stock.

In June 2012, the corporation declared that its board of directors had approved the voluntary delisting of its common stock from NASDAQ and the deregistration of the company's common stock with the Securities and Exchange Commission (SEC).
