= Holding company =

Company that owns other companies' outstanding stock

A holding company is a company whose primary business is holding a controlling interest in the securities of other companies. A holding company usually does not produce goods or services itself. Its purpose is to own stock of other companies to create a corporate group.

Holding companies may conduct trade and other business activities themselves. Holding companies reduce risk for the shareholders, and can permit the ownership and control of a number of different companies. They can be subsidiaries in a tiered structure.

Holding companies are also created to hold assets such as intellectual property or trade secrets that are protected from the operating company. That creates a smaller risk when it comes to litigation.

In the United States, 80% of stock, in voting and value, must be owned before tax consolidation benefits such as tax-free dividends can be claimed. That is, if Company A owns 80% or more of the stock of Company B, Company A will not pay taxes on dividends paid by Company B to its stockholders, as the payment of dividends from B to A is essentially transferring cash within a single enterprise. Any other shareholders of Company B will pay the usual taxes on dividends, as they are typical ordinary dividends to these shareholders.

In some jurisdictions, holding companies are called parent companies. The New York Times uses the term parent holding company. Sometimes, a company intended to be a holding company identifies itself as such by adding "Holding" or "Holdings" to its name.

== By country ==
=== Australia ===
The parent company–subsidiary company relationship is defined by Part 1.2, Division 6, Section 46 of the Corporations Act 2001 (Cth), which states:

A body corporate (in this section called the first body) is a subsidiary of another body corporate if, and only if:

(a) the other body:

(i) controls the composition of the first body's board; or
(ii) is in a position to cast, or control the casting of, more than one-half of the maximum number of votes that might be cast at a general meeting of the first body; or
(iii) holds more than one-half of the issued share capital of the first body (excluding any part of that issued share capital that carries no right to participate beyond a specified amount in a distribution of either profits or capital); or

(b) the first body is a subsidiary of a subsidiary of the other body.

=== Canada ===
Toronto-based lawyer Michael Finley has stated, "The emerging trend that has seen international plaintiffs permitted to proceed with claims against Canadian parent companies for the allegedly wrongful activity of their foreign subsidiaries means that the corporate veil is no longer a silver bullet to the heart of a plaintiff's case."

In Canada, holding companies are commonly used to facilitate tax-free intercorporate dividends, allowing dividends to flow from an operating subsidiary to a parent holding corporation without immediate corporate tax, provided certain ownership and control conditions are met under Canadian tax law.

=== Cyprus ===
In Cyprus, a company may function as a holding company by owning shares in domestic or foreign subsidiaries, investments, intellectual property or other assets. Dividend income is generally exempt from Cyprus corporate income tax, although exceptions apply where the dividend is deductible for tax purposes by the paying company. Anti-avoidance provisions may also affect the treatment of domestic and foreign dividends.

=== Singapore ===
The parent subsidiary company relationship is defined by Part 1, Section 5, Subsection 1 of the Companies Act, which states:

5.—(1) For the purposes of this Act, a corporation shall, subject to subsection (3), be deemed to be a subsidiary of another corporation, if —

(a) that other corporation —

(i) controls the composition of the board of directors of the first-mentioned corporation; or

[Act 36 of 2014 wef 01/07/2015]

(ii) controls more than half of the voting power of the first-mentioned corporation; or
(iii) [Deleted by Act 36 of 2014 wef 01/07/2015]

(b) the first-mentioned corporation is a subsidiary of any corporation which is that other corporation's subsidiary

=== United Kingdom ===
In the United Kingdom, is generally held that an organisation holding a 'controlling stake' in a company (a holding of over 51% of the stock) is in effect the de facto parent company of the firm, having overriding material influence over the held company's operations, even if no formal full takeover has been enacted. Once a full takeover or purchase is enacted, the held company is seen to have ceased to operate as an independent entity but to have become a tending subsidiary of the purchasing company, which, in turn, becomes the parent company of the subsidiary. (A holding below 50% could be sufficient to give a parent company material influence if they are the largest individual shareholder or if they are placed in control of the running of the operation by non-operational shareholders.)

==== Company law ====
In the United Kingdom, the term holding company is defined by the Companies Act 2006 at section 1159. It defines a holding company as a company that holds a majority of the voting rights in another company, or is a member of another company and has the right to appoint or remove a majority of its board of directors, or is a member of another company and controls alone, pursuant to an agreement with other members, a majority of the voting rights in that company.

=== United States ===
==== Banking ====
After the 2008 financial crisis, many U.S. investment banks converted to holding companies. According to the Federal Financial Institutions Examination Council's website, JPMorgan Chase, Bank of America, Citigroup, Wells Fargo, and Goldman Sachs were the five largest bank holding companies in the finance sector, as of December 2013, based on total assets.

==== Utilities ====
The Public Utility Holding Company Act of 1935 caused many energy companies to divest their subsidiary businesses. Between 1938 and 1958 the number of holding companies declined from 216 to 18. An energy law passed in 2005 removed the 1935 requirements, and has led to mergers and holding company formation among power marketing and power brokering companies.

==== Broadcasting ====
In American broadcasting, many major media conglomerates have purchased smaller broadcasters outright, but have not changed the broadcast licenses to reflect this, resulting in stations that are (for example) still licensed to Jacor and Citicasters, effectively making them such as subsidiary companies of their owner iHeartMedia. This is sometimes done on a per-market basis. For example, in Atlanta both WNNX and later WWWQ are licensed to "WNNX LiCo, Inc." (LiCo meaning "license company"), both owned by Susquehanna Radio (which was later sold to Cumulus Media). In determining caps to prevent excessive concentration of media ownership, all of these are attributed to the parent company, as are leased stations, as a matter of broadcast regulation.

==== Personal holding company ====
In the United States, a personal holding company is defined in section 542 of the Internal Revenue Code. A corporation is a personal holding company if both of the following requirements are met:

- Gross income test: at least 60% of the corporation's adjusted ordinary gross income is from dividends, interest, rent, and royalties.
- Stock ownership test: more than 50% in value of the corporation's outstanding stock is owned by five or fewer individuals.

== Parent company ==
A parent company is a company that owns enough voting power in another firm (or subsidiary) to control management and operations by influencing or electing its board of directors. The definition of a parent company normally differs across jurisdictions, as being defined by way of laws dealing with companies in that jurisdiction.

When an existing company establishes a new company and keeps majority shares with itself, and invites other companies to buy minority shares, it is called a parent company. A parent company could simply be a company that wholly owns another company, which is then known as a "wholly owned subsidiary".

== See also ==
- Berkshire Hathaway
- Chaebol
- Conglomerate
- Conglomerate discount
- Corporate group
- Investment company
- Keiretsu
- List of holding companies
- Multinational corporation
- Outline of management
- Patent holding company
