= Green Dot Corporation =

American issuer of prepaid debit cards

- Type: Public
- Traded as: NYSE: GDOT (Class A)
- Industry: Financial services
- Founded: 1999; 27 years ago
- Founder: Steve Streit
- Headquarters: Austin, Texas, U.S.
- Key people: George Gresham (CEO)
- Products: Prepaid MasterCard and Visa cards
- Brands: Go2Bank
- Revenue: ▲$2.08 billion (2025)
- Net income: ▼ −US$98.9 million (2025)
- Total assets: ▲US$5.99 billion (2025)
- Total equity: ▲US$890 million (2025)
- Number of employees: 1,200
- Website: greendot.com

Green Dot Corporation is an American financial technology and bank holding company headquartered in Austin, Texas. It is the world's largest prepaid debit card company by market capitalization. Green Dot is also a payment platform company and is the technology platform used by Apple Cash, Uber, and Intuit. The company was founded in 1999 by Steve Streit as a prepaid debit card for teenagers to shop online. In 2001, the company pivoted to serving the "unbanked" and "underbanked" communities. In 2010, Green Dot Corporation went public with a valuation of $2 billion. Since its inception, Green Dot has acquired a number of companies in the mobile, financial, and tax industries including Loopt, AccountNow, AchieveCard, UniRush Financial Services, and Santa Barbara Tax Products Group.

Green Dot Corporation is an issuer of prepaid MasterCard and Visa cards in the United States. These products are available at nearly 100,000 retail stores including 7-Eleven, CVS, Rite Aid, Walgreens, Dollar Tree; as well as discounted offerings at Meijer and Walmart. Green Dot also transfers individuals' direct deposit funds (such as Social Security payments) from the US government to personal bank accounts. They also provide co-branded card programs to Walmart, Boost Mobile, AT&T and Citibank. In 2007, Green Dot raised $20 million in funding, including Sequoia Capital as an investor. In 2008, Green Dot ceased to offer prepaid Discover cards. On July 30, 2019, Green Dot launched the Unlimited Cash Back Bank Account, offering 3% cash back as well as a savings account offering 3% interest known as the Unlimited cashback account.

The cards are normal debit cards, and not a line of credit. Purchases are deducted from the balance stored on the card. The user can add more money to the card by paying cash at a retail store's point of sale, or in certain cases from their paycheck.

== History ==
Originally known as Next Estate Communications, Green Dot Corporation was founded in 1999 by Steve Streit. Its first debit card, branded as I-GEN and marketed toward teenagers and Internet users, was released in 2000. In 2001 the first I-GEN MasterCard was sold at a Rite Aid in Virginia. Between 2001 and 2004, the company signed distribution agreements with CVS, The Pantry (Kangaroo Express) and RadioShack, among others.

In the year 2004, I-GEN officially changed its name to Green Dot and launched the first cash-accepting network for reloading the debit cards.

On July 22, 2010, Green Dot Corporation went public and started trading on the New York Stock Exchange. under the stock ticker: GDOT

In 2011, Green Dot expanded into offering banking services by acquiring Bonneville Bancorp and its subsidiary, Bonneville Bank, based in Provo, Utah. The acquisition was approved by the Federal Reserve, allowing Green Dot to become a bank holding company under the Bank Holding Company Act. This move enabled Green Dot to issue its own prepaid debit cards directly through its banking subsidiary and provide related financial services, enhancing its control over product offerings and customer experience.

In early 2012, Green Dot acquired the mobile location technology company Loopt for $43.4 million, retained Loopt's employees to develop GoBank, the first bank account designed to be opened and used from a mobile device. In 2016, ridesharing company Uber enlisted GoBank to be the principal payment processor for its drivers. Green Dot regards this as their pivot from a prepaid debit card company into a platform company.

In 2014, Green Dot Corporation acquired Santa Barbara Tax Products Group, the largest tax refund processor in America.

Green Dot continued its acquisition of competitors in 2015, purchasing Account Now Inc. and Achieve Card.

On September 24, 2014, Walmart announced it would be partnering with Green Dot Bank to begin offering Walmart customers checking accounts.

In 2016, GoBank partnered with Uber to launch the Uber Debit Card, enabling Uber drivers to cash out their ride fare immediately.

On January 30, 2017, it was reported that UniRush LLC would be sold to Green Dot Corp. in a deal valued around $147 million. The deal was projected to add around 750,000 cardholders to Green Dot's network.

In early December 2017, Green Dot Corporation announced that it was powering the Apple's new Apple Pay Cash P2P payment service. On May 7, 2021, CNBC reported that "Green Dot, a fintech firm and biggest U.S. provider of prepaid debit cards, is moving its headquarters from Pasadena, California to Austin, Texas."

=== Awards ===
CEO Steve Streit was nominated for Industry Executive of the Year at LendIt.

Green Dot was nominated for Solving Problems Through Payments during the 2018 Benzinga Fintech Awards.

== Prepaid Debit Cards ==
=== Unlimited Cash Back Bank Account ===
On July 30, 2019, Green Dot made its debut of a savings account for customers through a pre-paid debit card, the first in the industry, called the Unlimited cashback account. The card features a 3% cash back return on purchases, as well as a 3% APY towards a customer's savings account.

=== Green Dot Prepaid Card & Cash Back Debit Card ===
The Cash Back Debit Card is available online and in many stores, including CVS Pharmacy, Kmart, 7-Eleven and Walgreens while the prepaid card is only available in stores. Cards bought online are personalized with the customers name and cards bought in store are only a temporary card which does not have the customer's actual name on it; instead it says "Valued Customer". Temporary cards are not re-loadable. However, if the customer opts in to receive a personalized card, which is free of cost, in 7 to 10 business days it will arrive in mail with his or her name on it. Personalized cards are re-loadable in a variety of ways. There is a monthly charge of $9.95, unless the customer makes more than 30 purchases in a month or loads the card with more than $1000 in that month.

=== Uber Business Debit ===
Green Dot partnered with Uber on a business debit card for Uber Drivers to be able to get paid weekly or immediately through Green Dot's instant pay service by depositing earnings on to a debit card.

=== RushCard ===
RushCard is a personalized prepaid debit card offering early direct deposit, money management, and rewards. The card was founded in 2013, with co-founders such as Russell Simmons under the company UniRush LLC which was sold to Green Dot Corp. in a deal valued around $147 million.

=== Walmart MoneyCard ===
Walmart in partnership with Green Dot offers MoneyCard a reloadable prepaid debit card both online and in Walmart stores.

=== Reloading process ===
Card users can also opt to have their payroll transferred directly to the card through direct deposit and the card acting as their checking account. Additionally, the cards may be re-loaded using ACH transfers online directly from a bank account and even from PayPal. MoneyPak can be used to deposit cash onto card, which is available in the same stores GreenDot prepaid is. Most stores charge $5.95 for reloading.

== Reputation ==
As of December 2023, Green Dot has the following ratings:

Web site	Rating (out of 5)	Notes
Yelp	1	97% of reviews received 1 star (December 2023)
Credit Karma	1.7	81% of reviews received 1 star (December 2023)
Consumer Affairs	1.4	89% of reviews received 1 star (December 2023)
Better Business Bureau	1	7,035 closed complaints in the last 3 years (December 2023)

The majority of unfavorable reviews, listed in the sites above and other review sites, complain of Green Dot limiting access to a positive balance on the card, even though the funds have been added to the card with a cash purchase. The reviews also underscore the unwillingness or incapacity of Green Dot customer service to resolve these issues. The majority of recent positive reviews on Consumer Affairs mention the convenience and speed of automatic direct deposits.

== Credit cards ==
Green Dot Corporation also issues a secured payment card, the Platinum Visa Secured card. This is a Visa card that is secured by a deposit, and is not a debit card nor is it a prepaid card. It is a credit card.

== MoneyPak ==
MoneyPak is used to deposit cash to Green Dot prepaid cards but it can also be used to deposit cash onto third party prepaid or bank debit cards. MoneyPak is available in the same stores GreenDot prepaid is and most stores charge $5.95 for reloading.

=== Security concerns ===
- In June 2011, the Better Business Bureau and the Minnesota Department of Public Safety issued warnings regarding the illegal use of Green Dot's MoneyPak cards to defraud consumers.
- In January 2012, The office of New York State Senator Martin Golden issued an alert from Con Edison regarding various scams, including "Green Dot scams."
- In March 2012, Time magazine reported on how the 419 scam was now being adapted to the relative anonymity of MoneyPak cards. The AARP Issued a warning on the rise of MoneyPak fraud in 2012 that followed the decline in MoneyGram fraud after MoneyGram was fined 18 million dollars "to settle FTC charges that it allowed its money transfer system to be used for fraud".
- In August 2012, the FBI also issued a warning that scammers were taking advantage of MoneyPak's untraceability to coerce unwitting victims into paying a "ransom" to unlock their computers infected with malware. AVG Technologies notes that in some cases (like the FBI scam), criminals are using malware to deceive victims into thinking their computer has been flagged for serious crimes, after which the relatively easy anonymity of MoneyPak cards is taken advantage of to allow for "untraceable" extortions.
- Beginning in mid-2013, Green Dot MoneyPak cards were being used to commit fraud, with persons asking callers under the guise of a customer service agent for a utility company such as a power or gas provider asking for immediate payment under threat of disconnection using a personal card or asking the caller to head to a store selling Green Dot cards and giving them the card number the funds were placed on. Several national chains now have policies of asking the customer to confirm the purpose of their use of the card for these amounts and will refuse to execute the transaction if this type of scam is suspected for the use of the card.
- In September 2013, several Walgreens and other large chain drug stores through the United States were evacuated because of bomb threats called into the stores, with the caller asking for a 'ransom' from the stores of multiple Green Dot cards with large amounts activated using store registers which would then be placed in an unmonitored location for the culprits to pick up, or the numbers read through the phone.
- In 2015, scammers were taking advantage of Green Dot cards when filing false income tax returns using compromised Social Security numbers. The criminal opens a Green Dot account in the victim's name, making that account the payee for a refund claimed on the fraudulent tax return. The stolen SSN is used both to file the false tax return and to open the Green Dot account, which is emptied if the refund is paid. The victim receives an unexpected letter containing a permanent (embossed with the victim's name) Green Dot card for the account, a probable indicator of SSN compromise and attempted fraud.
