= Andy Rachleff =

American businessman

- Education: University of Pennsylvania; Stanford University
- Occupations: Executive chairman of Wealthfront; Stanford Graduate School of Business lecturer
- Known for: Benchmark Capital; Wealthfront
- Board member of: University of Pennsylvania; Damon Runyon Cancer Research Foundation
- Spouse: Debra Rachleff

Andy Rachleff is a co-founder and Executive Chairman of Wealthfront. He had previously been the executive chairman of the company after stepping down as the CEO, but then returned to the CEO role on October 31, 2016. Rachleff co-founded Benchmark Capital in 1995 and was a general partner until 2004. Prior to Benchmark, Rachleff was a general partner with Merrill, Pickard, Anderson & Eyre, a venture capital firm.

== Education ==
In 1980, Rachleff earned a Bachelor of Science has a (BS) from the University of Pennsylvania. Four years later, he earned a Master's degree (MBA) from Stanford University.

== Career ==
Rachleff co-founded Benchmark Capital, a venture capital firm, in 1995. The firm invested in companies including eBay, OpenTable, Snapchat, Twitter and Uber. Rachleff led investments in Blue Coat Systems, Equinix and Juniper Networks.

In late 2004, Rachleff retired from Benchmark Capital. He began teaching technology entrepreneurship courses at Stanford Graduate School of Business in January 2005.

In 2008, Rachleff co-founded Wealthfront (formerly known as kaChing). In December 2011, the company launched its automated investment service. Rachleff was the CEO and president until Adam Nash succeeded him on January 1, 2014. He returned to the CEO role on October 31, 2016 and is CEO and chairman of the company.

Rachleff teaches courses on technology entrepreneurship at Stanford Graduate School of Business. He is a trustee of the University of Pennsylvania, chairman of the board of overseers for its School of Engineering and Applied Science and vice chairman of its endowment investment committee. He is also a board member of the Damon Runyon Cancer Research Foundation.

== Board memberships and philanthropy ==
In 2000, Rachleff joined the University of Pennsylvania Board of Advisors for the school of engineering. Five years later, he also joined the University of Pennsylvania board of trustees, serving as Chairman of the university's endowment investment committee. He is also a member of the university's executive committee.

Rachleff and his wife, Debra, partnered with the Damon Runyon Cancer Research Foundation in 2007 to fund novel cancer research projects that did not receive funding from the National Institutes of Health.
