= Bob Kagle =

American businessman

Robert Kagle
- Born: Flint, Michigan, US
- Education: General Motors Institute; Stanford Graduate School of Business
- Occupation: Business director
- Organization: eBay et al

Robert Kagle is an American businessman. He is a director at eBay and a partner at Benchmark, a Silicon Valley venture capital firm. In addition to eBay, Kagle sits on the board of directors for several companies including: E-Loan, Jamba Juice, Logoworks, Mint.com, Prosper, uShip, and ZipRealty.

Kagle's investment in eBay is seen as his first—and biggest—success. Benchmark's $6.7 million investment in eBay "holds the record for the best performing Silicon Valley investment ever: by the spring of 1999, this stake was worth $5 billion". Kagle's share was $170 million, and he has been a director for eBay since 1997.

Kagle was born and raised by his mother in Flint, Michigan. Kagle began his business career working at General Motors, and received a B.S. in electrical and mechanical engineering from General Motors Institute (renamed Kettering University) in 1978. He received his M.B.A. from Stanford Graduate School of Business in 1980.

Before his work at Benchmark, Kagle was a partner at Technology Venture Investors. Prior to his 12 years at TVI, Kagle worked for the Boston Consulting Group.
