= Wealthfront =

American financial services company

Wealthfront Corporation
- Type: Public
- Traded as: Nasdaq: WLTH
- Industry: Financial services
- Founded: 2008; 18 years ago in Redwood City, California, U.S.
- Founders: Andy Rachleff; Dan Carroll
- Headquarters: Palo Alto, California, U.S.
- Area served: U.S.
- Key people: Andy Rachleff (Chairman); David Fortunato (CEO)
- Products: Asset management; Equities trading; Investment management; Wealth management; Mortgage loans
- Revenue: ▲$339 million (2025)
- Net income: ▼$123 million (2025)
- AUM: $95 billion (2026)
- Number of employees: 330 (2025)
- Website: www.wealthfront.com

Wealthfront Corporation is an American financial services company based in Palo Alto, California, founded by Andy Rachleff and Dan Carroll in 2008. As of September 2026, Wealthfront reported approximately $100 billion assets under management for more than 1.5 million clients.

== History ==
Wealthfront was founded by Benchmark co-founder Andy Rachleff with Dan Carroll in 2008 as kaChing, a mutual fund analysis company, before pivoting into wealth management. Rachleff served as the firm's founding CEO and president until January 2014. Between January 2014 and October 2016, Adam Nash served as Wealthfront's CEO. Rachleff continued to serve as executive chairman until stepping down in 2016 to serve as CEO again. He then returned to his position as executive chairman in 2021. David Fortunato served as the firm's chief technology officer from 2009 to 2019, after which he assumed the role of president and CEO.

== Operations and growth ==
In December 2012, the firm started tax loss harvesting for accounts of more than $100,000.

Assets under management increased from $97 million at the beginning of 2013 to approximately $530 million by the end of the fiscal year. In 2013, Wealthfront introduced "direct indexing", a tax-loss harvesting platform that purchases the individual securities of an investment portfolio.

In January 2018, Wealthfront launched homeownership planning tool for Path.

On September 9, 2026, Wealthfront announced they had over $100 billion in total platform assets across 1.5 million customers. They attributed the milestone to their client-first business model, user friendly functionality, and focus on long term growth.

== Services ==
=== Cash account ===
In February 2019, the firm introduced the Wealthfront Cash Account, which provides banking as a service (BaaS). A Cash Account deposits client funds in a network of partner banks including Citibank, HSBC, and UMB. In 2020, the account was expanded to allow for direct deposit, bill pay, and ATM access through Green Dot Bank. In June 2026, Wealthfront announced UMB Bank would be providing these features for all users by October 2026.

Weathfront offers individual, joint, and trust cash accounts. These accounts operate as a cash management account, offering high yield interest rates with transaction handling similar to that of a checking account. Wealthfront offers ATM reimbursements, direct deposit, bill pay, and an optional debit card as part of their cash account offering.

On September 18, 2026, Wealthfront announced they were raising interest rates on their cash accounts to 3.55% APY, with various promotional boosts, in response to the Federal Reserve voting unanimously to raise rates 25 basis points on September 16.

== Partnerships and acquisitions ==
In 2016, Wealthfront launched a partnership with the state of Nevada to launch a 529 tax-advantaged college savings plan. In the previous year, Nevada passed approval on a new tax credit for employers who provide fund matching to employees participating in 529 savings programs.

In January 2022, UBS agreed to acquire Wealthfront for $1.4 billion. The acquisition was mutually terminated in September 2022 with neither companies providing a reason. UBS announced that it would instead invest in a $69.7 million note convertible into Wealthfront shares, valuing the latter at its acquisition price.

In July 2024, Wealthfront acquired a mortgage company as part of its entry into home lending.

In December 2025, Wealthfront completed an initial public offering on the Nasdaq Global Select Market under the ticker symbol "WLTH". The company raised approximately $485 million, pricing shares at $14 per share, resulting in a fully diluted market capitalization of approximately $2.6 billion.

== Finances ==
The company has received funding from Benchmark Capital, DAG Ventures, Index Ventures, Social Capital and individuals, including Marc Andreessen and Jeff Jordan. In April 2014, Wealthfront raised $35 million in a funding round led by Index Ventures, Ribbit Capital and Benchmark Capital. The funding round brought the firm's total funding to $65.5 million.

== Awards and recognition ==
Wealthfront has been included in financial publications for its services. In 2015, Forbes included Wealthfront on its inaugural Fintech 50 list. In January 2020, Wealthfront was listed in Business Insider's Top 10 Best Robo Advisors in 2020.

In 2024 and 2025, Wealthfront was named to the Real Simple Smart Money Awards lists, and was again named to the annual Forbes Fintech 50 list.

The Wall Street Journal has also recognized Wealthfront as the Best Robo Advisor for Multiple Goals.

== See also ==
- Robo-advisor
