= Grauman's Chinese Theatre =

Movie theater in Los Angeles, California, US

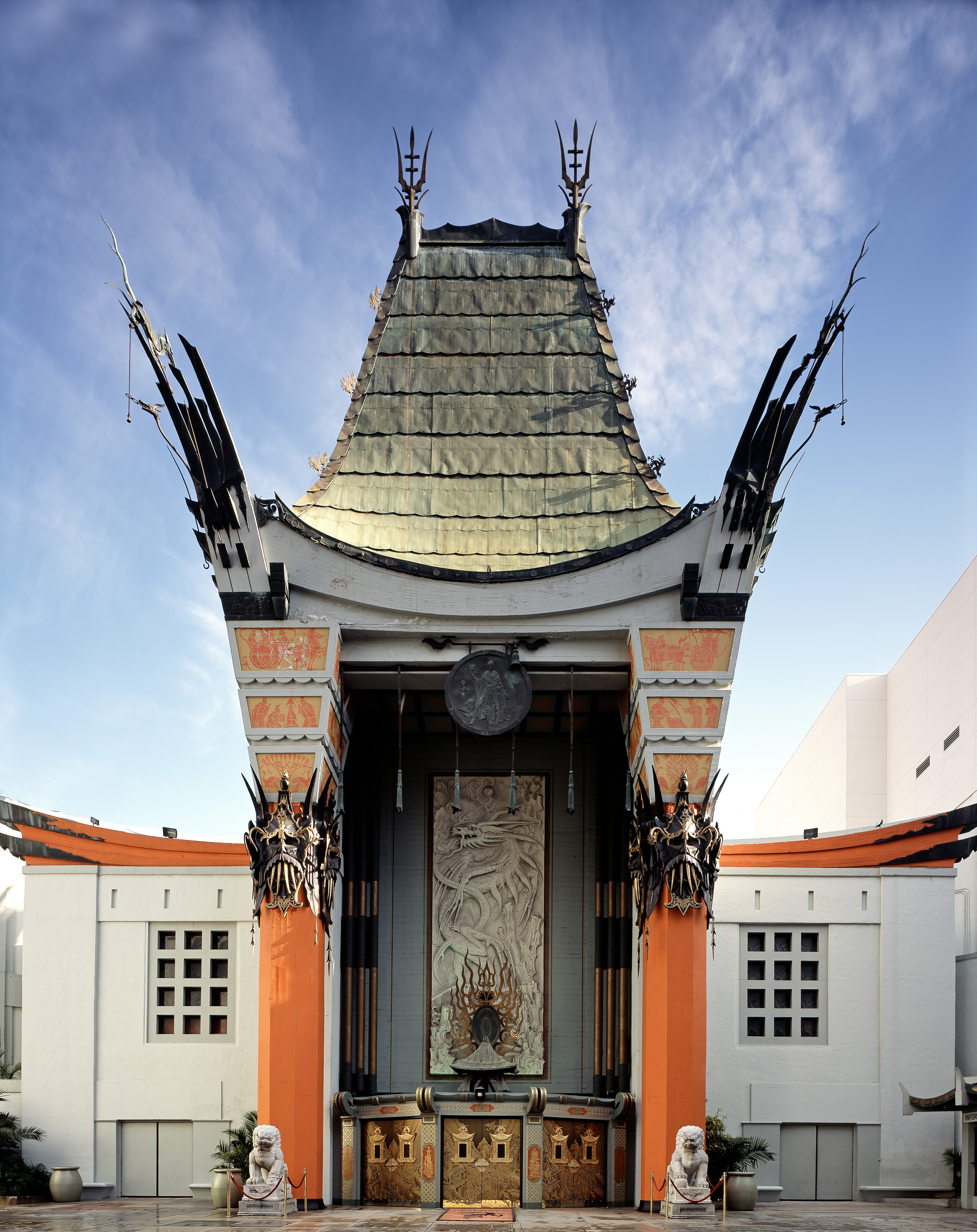
- The forecourt entrance, Hollywood Boulevard
- Interactive map of Grauman's Chinese Theatre
- Former names: Mann's Chinese Theatre (1973–2001); Grauman's Chinese Theatre (1927–1973; 2001–2013)
- Address: 6925 Hollywood Boulevard; Hollywood, California; 90028
- Coordinates: 34°6′7″N 118°20′27.5″W
- Owner: Chinese Theatres, LLC
- Capacity: 932 (as of 2013)
- Type: Indoor movie theater
- Public transit: Hollywood/Highland

Construction
- Groundbreaking: January 5, 1926
- Built: January 16, 1926
- Opened: May 18, 1927
- Renovated: 2001–04; 2013 (Digital IMAX conversion); 2014 (70mm IMAX installation for Interstellar); 2015 (IMAX with Laser installation)
- Architects: Raymond M. Kennedy, employee of Meyer and Holler

Website
- www.tclchinesetheatres.com

Los Angeles Historic-Cultural Monument
- Designated: June 5, 1968
- Reference no.: 55

U.S. National Register of Historic Places
- Designated: April 4, 1985
- Part of: Hollywood Boulevard Commercial and Entertainment National Historic District
- Reference no.: 85000704

Grauman's Chinese Theatre, known as the Chinese Theater colloquially, and officially branded as the TCL Chinese Theatre for sponsorship reasons, is a movie palace on the Hollywood Walk of Fame in the Hollywood neighborhood of Los Angeles, California, United States.

The original Chinese Theatre was commissioned following the success of the nearby Grauman's Egyptian Theatre, which opened in 1922. Both were built as Exotic Revival style architecture. Built by a partnership headed by Sid Grauman over 18 months beginning in January 1926, the theater opened May 18, 1927, with the premiere of Cecil B. DeMille's The King of Kings. It has since been home to many premieres, including the 1977 debut of Star Wars, as well as many private events and three Academy Awards ceremonies. Among the theater's features are the concrete blocks set in the forecourt, which bear the signatures, footprints, and handprints of popular motion picture personalities from the 1920s to the present day.

Originally named Grauman's Chinese Theatre, it was renamed Mann's Chinese Theatre in 1973, and reverted to its original name in 2001. On January 11, 2013, Chinese electronics manufacturer TCL Corp. purchased the facility's naming rights for $5 million.

In 2013, the Chinese Theatre collaborated with IMAX Corporation to convert the house into a custom-designed IMAX theater. Following the renovation, the theater seated 932 and featured one of the largest movie screens in North America.

== History ==
=== Beginnings ===
In March 1923, a meeting occurred at the offices of Fox West Coast Theatres where Sid Grauman, Mary Pickford, Douglas Fairbanks, and several other executives discussed plans for a new US$1 million venue that would be dedicated to "the spoken drama" with films only being screened on rare occasions. Although the project called for immediate construction, it was ultimately shelved for three years. In that time, several of its aspects were altered, including a change in scope from play house to movie theater due to the increasing profitability of motion pictures.

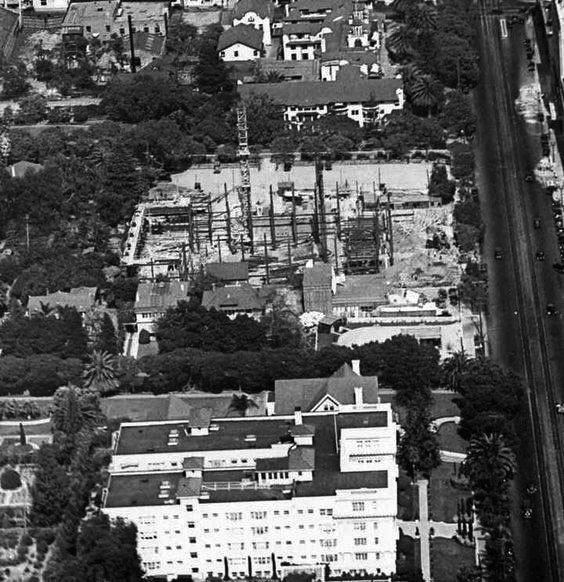
The theatre under construction in 1926. The Garden Court Apartments is in the foreground.

Grauman, a theater mogul who previously founded the Million Dollar Theatre and Egyptian Theatre, moved forward with the plans for a new venue in 1925. Looking to build along Hollywood Boulevard, he leased the site of actor Francis X. Bushman's mansion in a deal brokered by real estate developer Charles E. Toberman. In appreciation, a plaque was installed on the front of the theater dedicating it to Bushman.

Los Angeles-based architecture firm Meyer & Holler, which previously collaborated with Grauman on the Egyptian, designed the "palace-type" Chinese Theatre. Raymond M. Kennedy served as principal architect on the project. In October 1925, local newspapers published an artist's impression of the planned theater's facade. The accounts promised a US$5 million cost as well as a "tropical garden" in the forecourt, complete with imported flowers, trees, and fish in ponds. In contrast to early reports, the theater cost $2.1 million to construct. Grauman co-owned the venue with Pickford, Fairbanks, Howard Schenck, and West Coast Theatres.

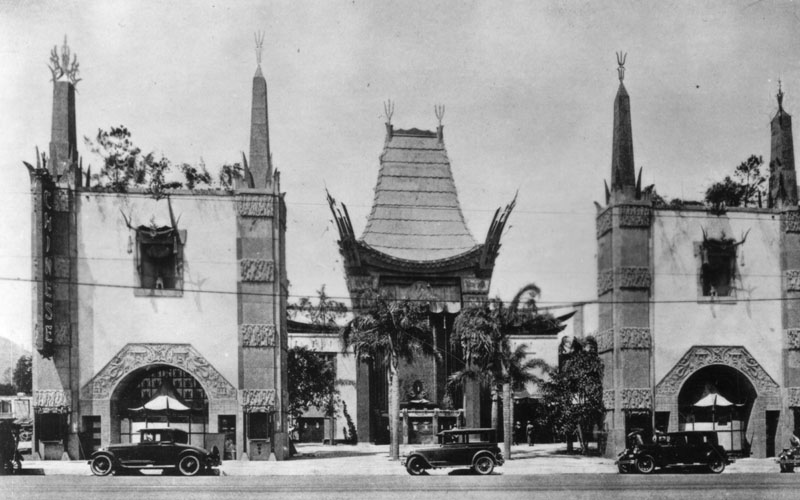
Grauman's Chinese Theatre in 1927

The groundbreaking ceremony for the Chinese Theatre occurred on the evening of January 5, 1926. Newspapers heralded the public event as the founding of "the world's most unusual playhouse". Celebrities in attendance included Grauman, Charlie Chaplin, Conrad Nagel, Norma Talmadge, and Anna May Wong. Talmadge and Wong turned the first spadeful of earth using a gold-plated shovel. Wong also put the first rivet into the structure of the theater.

During construction, Grauman hired Jean Klossner to formulate an extremely hard concrete for the forecourt of the theater. Klossner later became known as "Mr. Footprint", performing the footprint ceremonies from 1927 through 1957.

Many stories exist to explain the origins of the footprints. The theater's official account credits Norma Talmadge as having inspired the tradition when she accidentally stepped into the wet concrete. However, in a short interview during the September 13, 1937, Lux Radio Theatre broadcast of a radio adaptation of A Star Is Born, Grauman related another version of how he got the idea to put hand and foot prints in the concrete. He said it was "pure accident. I walked right into it. While we were building the theatre, I accidentally happened to step in some soft concrete. And there it was. So, I went to Mary Pickford immediately. Mary put her foot into it."

Another account, says that the original "accidental" slabs were made and stayed, at the curb, on the sidewalk, until 1958, when they were removed for the Hollywood Walk of Fame.

When they stepped up off the curb, they accidentally walked on wet cement and left a trail of footprints from the street to the front doors of the theater ... The stars, seeing what they had done, grabbed a nail on the ground and signed their names next to their footprints, Pickford even dated it." — Marc Wanamaker, Hollywood Heritage Museum.

Still another account by Klossner recounts that Klossner autographed his work next to the right-hand poster kiosk and that Grauman and he developed the idea then and there. His autograph and handprint, dated 1927, remain today. (Note: In 1949, Klossner's story changed to say that Grauman had accidentally stepped into the wet concrete.) The theater's third founding partner, Douglas Fairbanks, was the second celebrity after Talmadge to be immortalized in the concrete.

In 1929, Grauman decided to retire and sell his share to William Fox's Fox Theatres chain. However, just a few months later, Howard Hughes convinced Grauman to return to the theater, because he wanted Grauman to produce the world premiere of his aviation epic Hell's Angels, which would also feature one of Grauman's theatrical prologues before the film. Grauman remained as the theater's managing director for the entire run of Hell's Angels, retiring once again after its run finished. Unsatisfied with retirement, though, Grauman returned to the theater as managing director on Christmas Day 1931 and kept that position until his death in 1950.

=== Continued success ===
The Chinese Theatre hosted the 1944, 1945, and 1946 Academy Awards ceremonies; they are now held at the adjacent Dolby Theatre, formerly known as the Kodak Theatre.

One of the highlights of the Chinese Theatre has always been its grandeur and décor. In 1952, John Tartaglia, the artist of nearby Saint Sophia Cathedral, became the head interior decorator of the Chinese Theatre, as well as the theater chain then owned by Fox West Coast Theatres. He later continued the work of Klossner, by recommendation of J. Walter Bantau, for the Hollywood footprint ceremonies.

Tartaglia performed his first ceremony as what the City of Los Angeles termed "Hollywood's Master Mason" for Jean Simmons in 1953, for the premiere of The Robe, the first premiere in CinemaScope. Although replacing Klossner was initially thought to be a temporary job for Tartaglia, his dedication resulted in a 35-year career in which he last performed as the master mason/concrete artist in honor of Eddie Murphy in May 1987. Tartaglia was formally recognized by the City of Los Angeles in October 2011.

=== Preservation and modernization ===
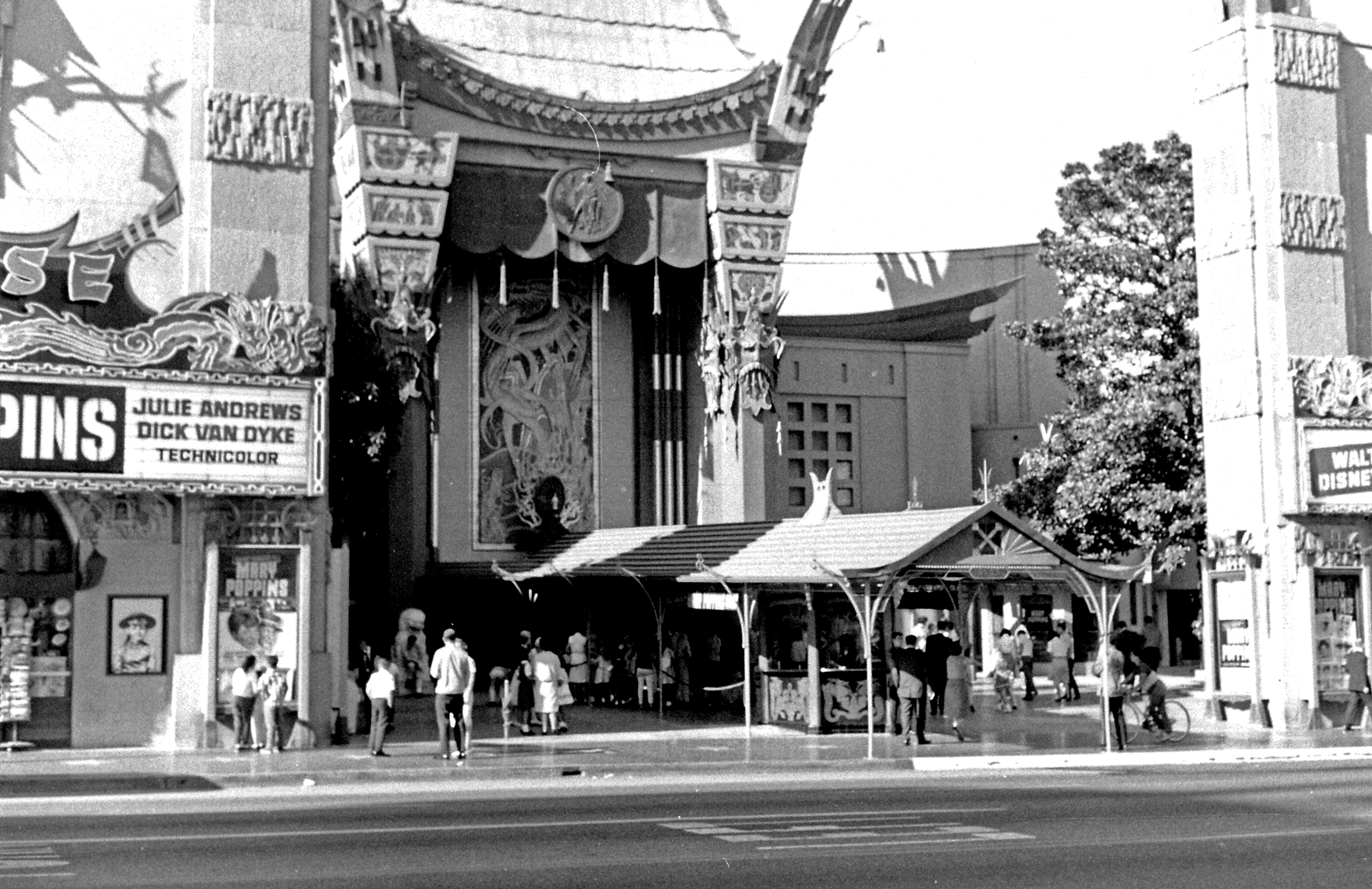
The theater in 1964

The Chinese Theatre was declared a historic and cultural landmark in 1968, and has undergone restoration projects in the years since then. Ted Mann, owner of the Mann Theatres chain and husband of actress Rhonda Fleming, purchased it in 1973. From then until 2001, it was known as Mann's Chinese Theatre. Mann Theatres grew to become the largest independent chain in the country before Mann sold the business, including the Chinese Theatre, to Gulf+Western in 1986.

In 1985, the Hollywood Boulevard Commercial and Entertainment District was added to the National Register of Historic Places, with the Chinese Theater listed as a contributing property in the district.

In 1988, Warner Bros. Discovery's predecessor, Warner Communications Inc., bought a 50% stake from Gulf+Western for $150 million. The theater chain was eventually sold to WestStar Holdings in 1997. In 2000, a partnership of Warner Bros. and Paramount Pictures acquired the theater, along with the other Mann Theatres properties.

In 2000, Behr Browers Architects, a firm previously engaged by Mann Theatres, prepared a restoration and modernization program for the structure. The program included a seismic upgrade, new state-of-the-art immersive sound and projection, new vending kiosks, and exterior signage, and the addition of a larger concession area under the balcony. The program began in 2002 and restored the original name — "Grauman's Chinese Theatre" — to the cinema palace. As part of the upgrade, Behr Browers also designed a new Chinese-themed six-plex in the attached Hollywood and Highland shopping center that continued to operate under the name Mann's Chinese 6 Theatre.

In 2007, the CIM Group purchased the land on which the theater sits for an undisclosed price from the Damon Runyon Cancer Research Foundation of New York and Barlow Respiratory Hospital of Los Angeles. CIM Group also owns the Hollywood and Highland shopping center, as well as numerous other residential and commercial properties in Hollywood. On May 27, 2011, Chinese Theatres LLC, a collaboration owned by producer Elie Samaha and Donald Kushner, purchased both Grauman's Chinese Theatre and the adjacent Mann Chinese 6.

Grauman's Chinese Theatre was sold for $25 million in 2013, and today it continues to serve the public as a first-run movie theater.

== Architecture ==
=== Exterior ===
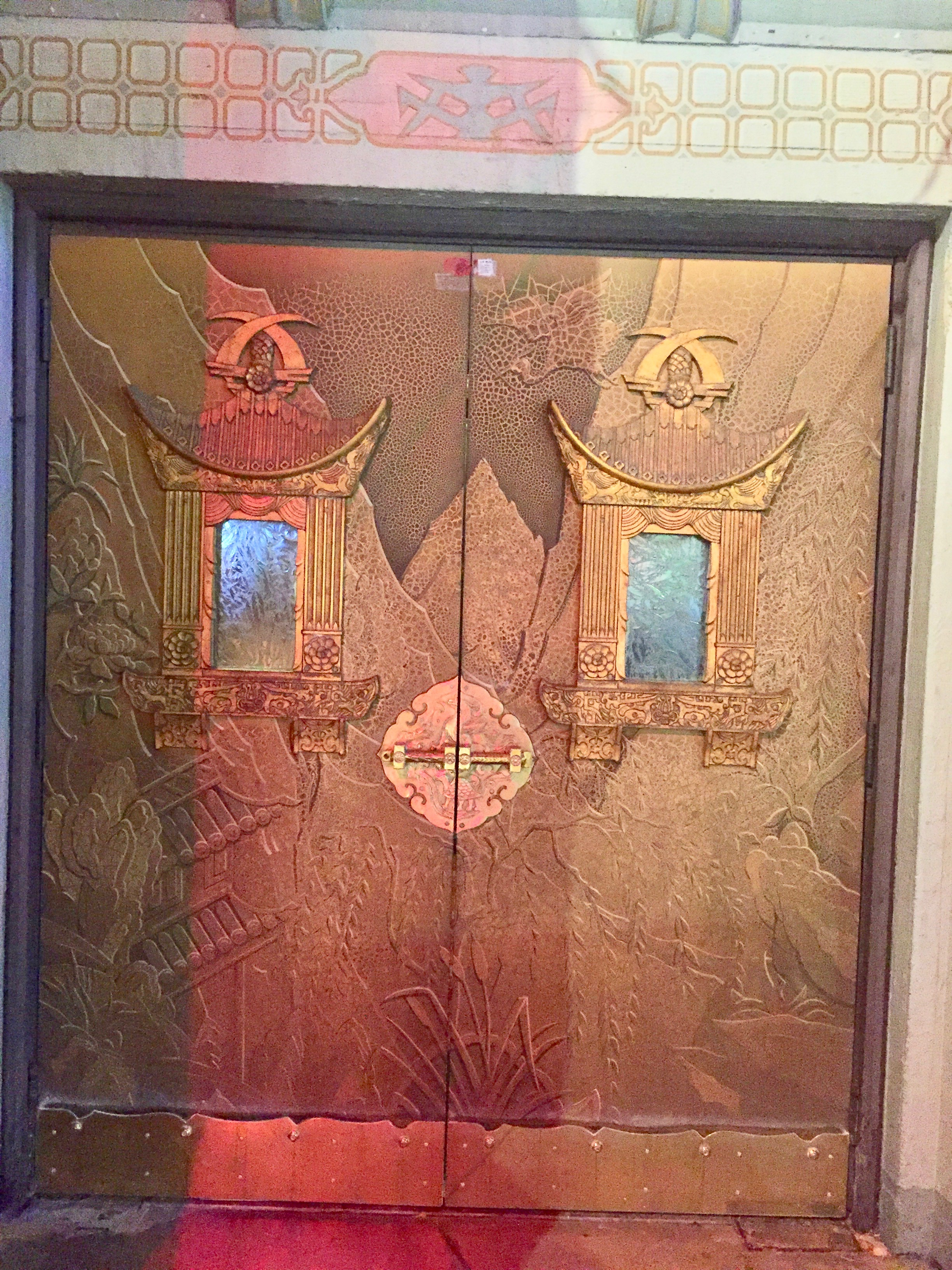
The theater's front doors

Raymond M. Kennedy, a Southern California architect of the firm Meyer & Holler, designed the Chinese Theatre at the behest of owner Sid Grauman. Prior to conceiving the Exotic Revival-style plan for the Chinese Theatre, Meyer & Holler had previously designed the similarly themed West Coast Theatre in Long Beach. Plans called for an ambitious venue that would cost US$2.1 million to construct, considered a very high budget for a movie theater at the time.

The exterior's most notable feature is the 90 foot (27 m)-tall pagoda centered in the middle of the forecourt. The pagoda's upright structure is supported by two prominent red pillars and its roof is plated in bronze. The design features numerous traditional Chinese ornamentations, including a 30 foot (9.1 m)-tall stone-carved mural of a dragon on the central wall between the columns. Two Ming dynasty-era guardian lion statues flank the venue's entrance. The U.S. government granted permission for the statues, as well as temple bells and other artifacts, to be imported from China. Moon Quon, a Chinese poet and filmmaker, traveled to the United States to oversee a team of Chinese artisans tasked with creating the theater's traditional decoration. Xavier Cugat painted the trees and foliage between the pillars on the side walls and Keye Luke painted the Chinese murals in the lobby.

=== Interior ===
The auditorium features a sixty-foot-wide ornate doily on its ceiling with various silver dragon emblems and gold medallions. A bronze chandelier fashioned to appear as a lantern hangs from the center of the doily. The theater's color scheme is primarily various shades of red – ruby, crimson, pale scarlet, and coral lacquer – with bronze, gold, stone, and silver providing accents. Author Charles Beardsley likened the auditorium to a "gigantic shrine at the time of the Five Emperors or the Dynasty of Hsia".

In its original configuration, the auditorium included a 150 foot (46 m)-wide, 46 foot (14 m)-deep, 71 foot (22 m)-high stage, one of the largest in the world. The stage was divided into sections, making it possible to recess it into a 20 foot (6.1 m)-deep pit below in order to quickly change sets during live productions. The theater used "its own power plant" and an "auxiliary dynamo system" to generate its electricity independent of the city power grid.

Despite the grandiose nature and high construction cost of the theater, its original capacity of 2,258 was only about half of the seats that the largest movie palaces had at the time. The lack of a proper general-admission balcony partly contributed to its smaller size; instead, the auditorium features four private box suites.

The Chinese Theatre was the first commercial movie theater to have air conditioning. The vents are concealed behind the imported decorative pillars on the side walls of the auditorium. The interior design also features a concealed three-manual, 17-rank Wurlitzer organ; its pipes were above the proscenium with tone chutes directing the sound through holes in the ceiling to make the sounds "feel like they were descending from the heavens." In 1957, theater ownership removed the organ and gave it to the Roman Catholic Archdiocese of Los Angeles, who in turn installed most of its parts at the St. Finbar Church in Burbank.

A concession stand was not in the theater's original plans because Grauman thought it would detract from the theatrical experience. The theater began to sell concessions in the 1930s.

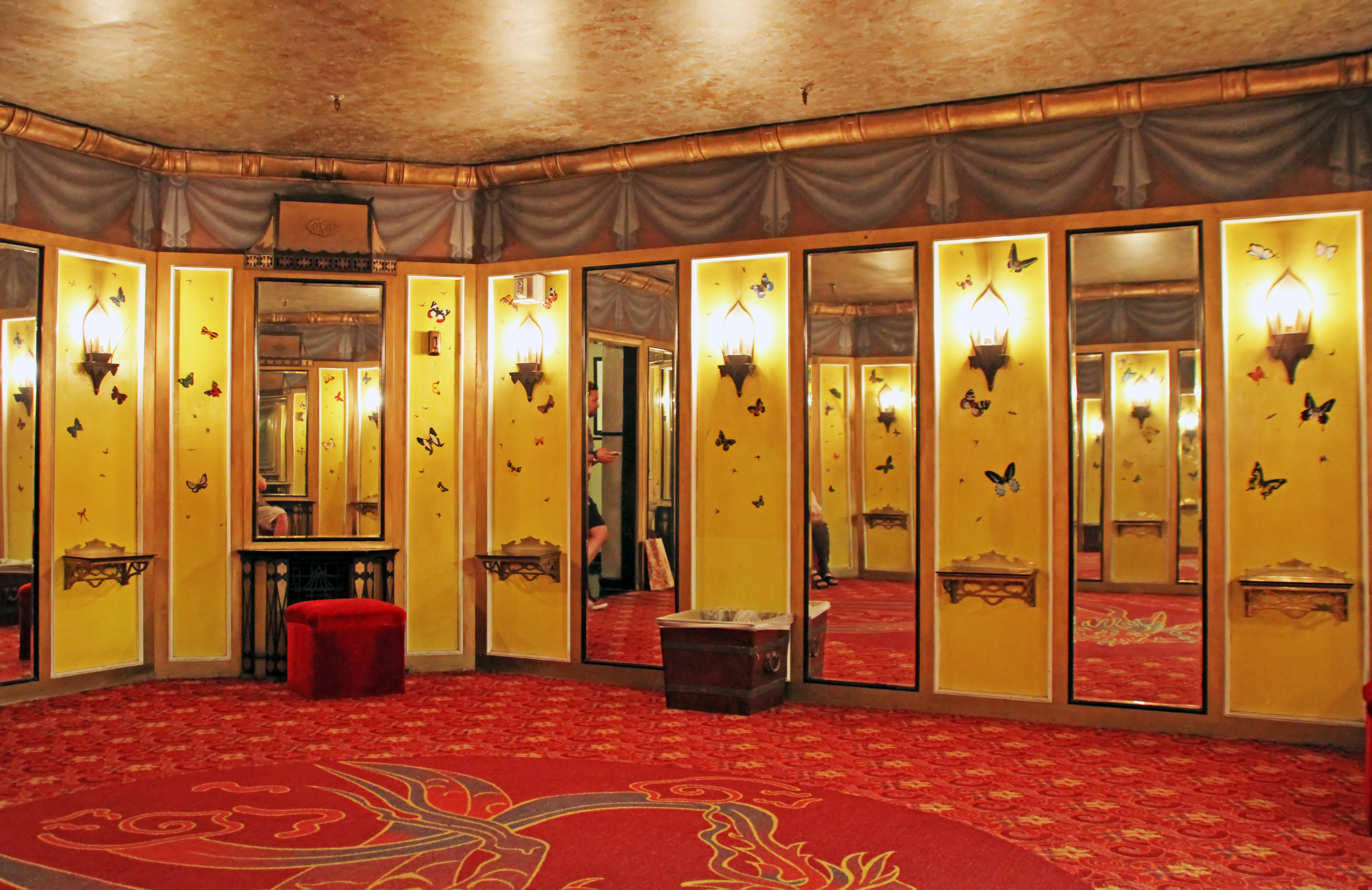
Hall interior of the Chinese Theatre

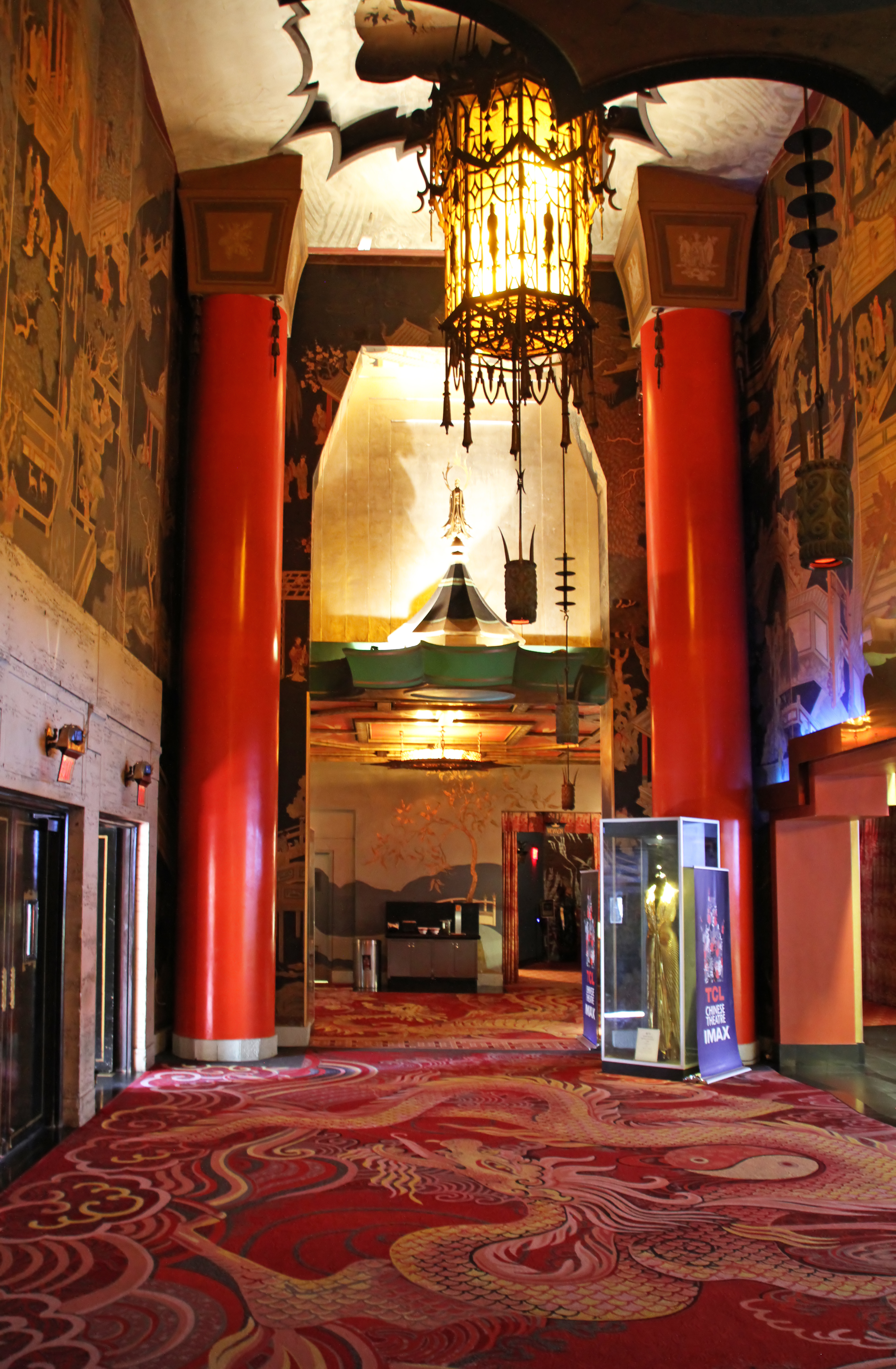
Interior corridor

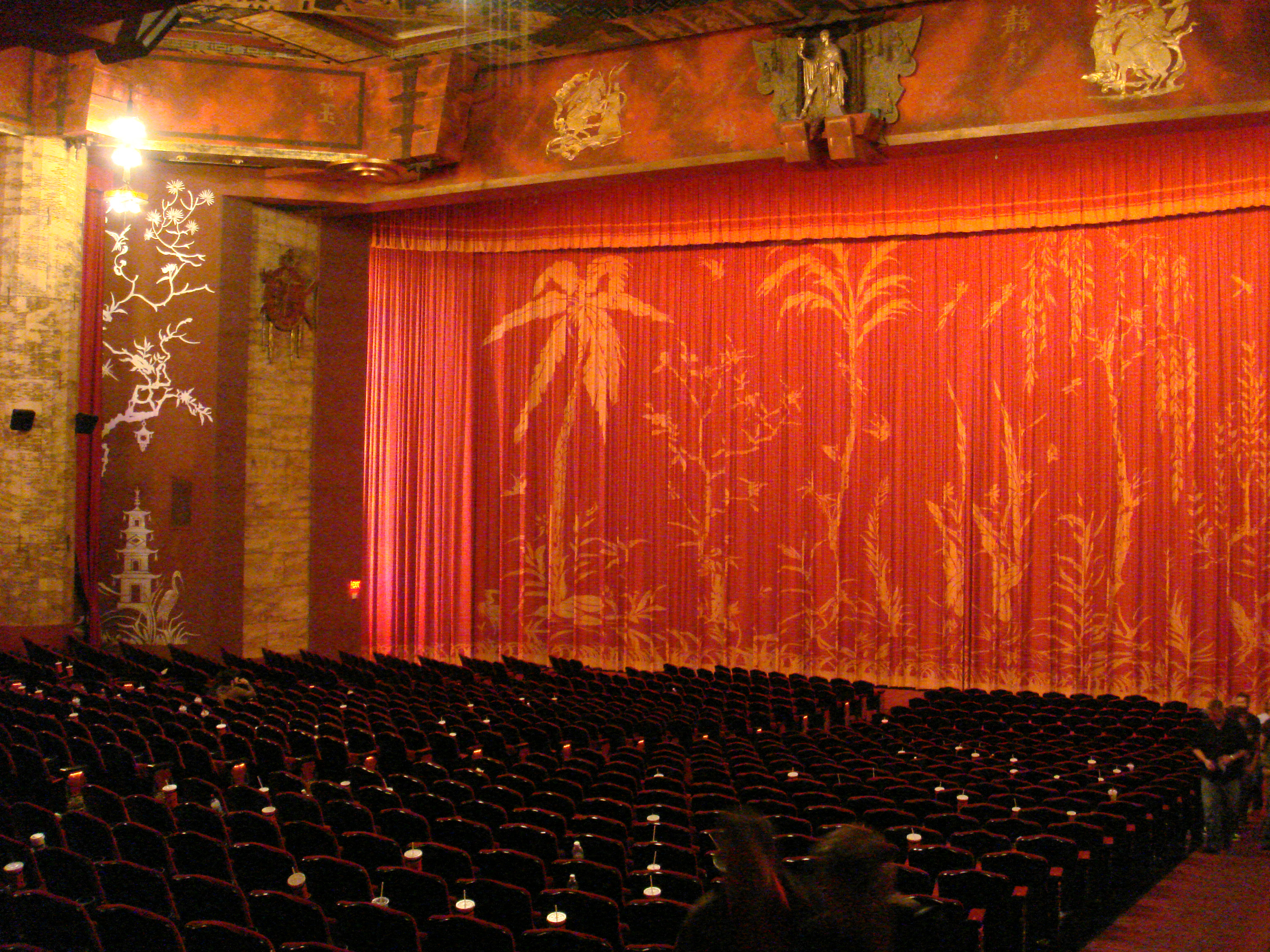
The interior of the Chinese Theatre before its refurbishment

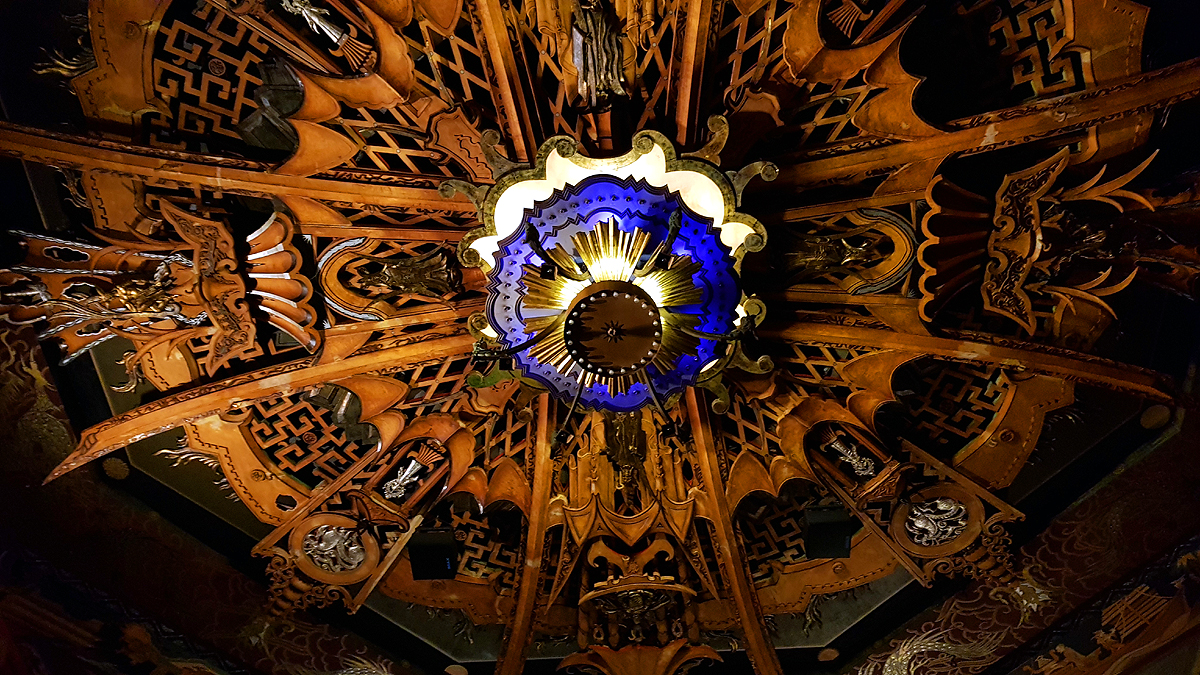
The ceiling of the Chinese Theatre

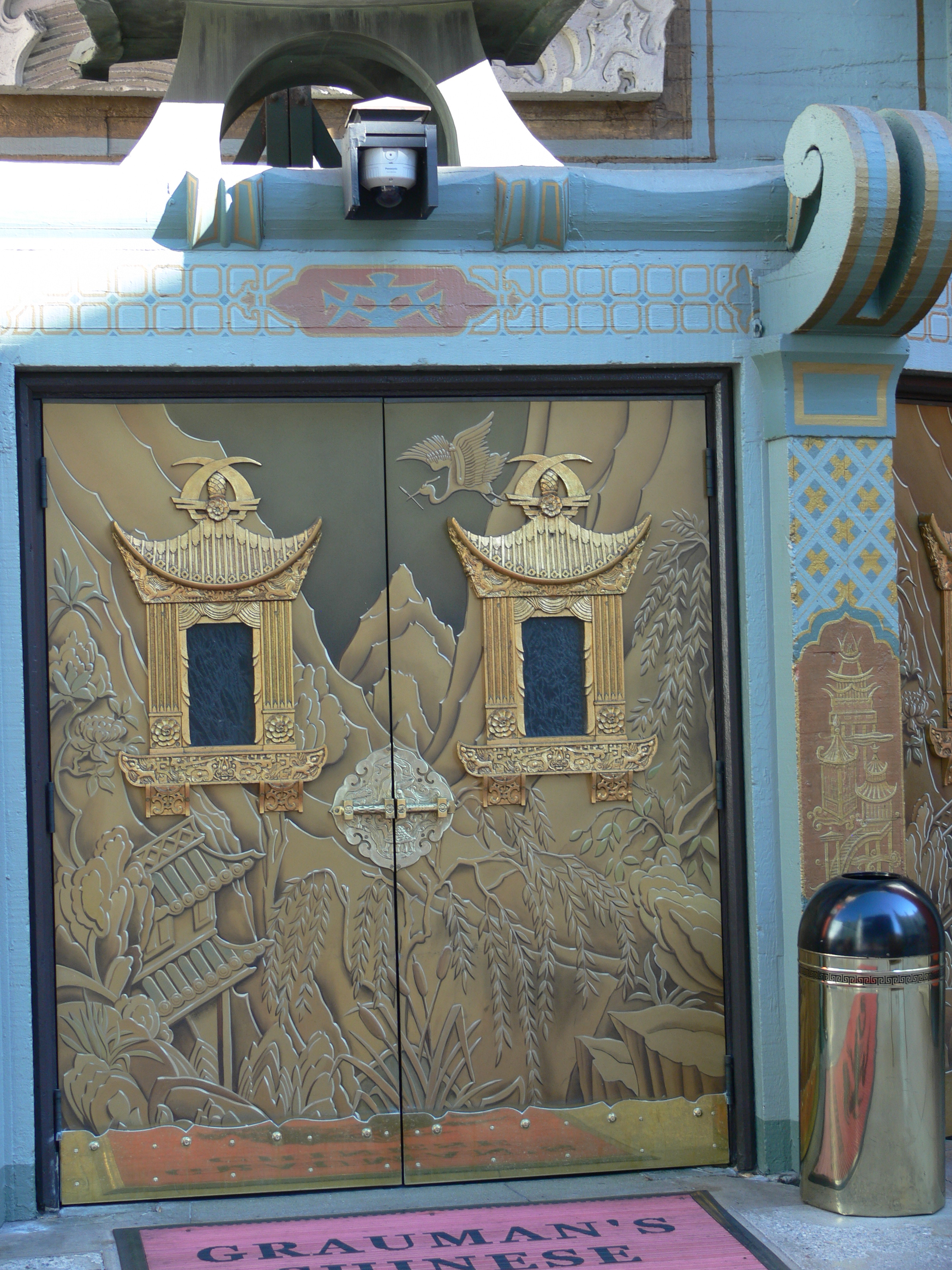
Entrance of the Chinese Theatre

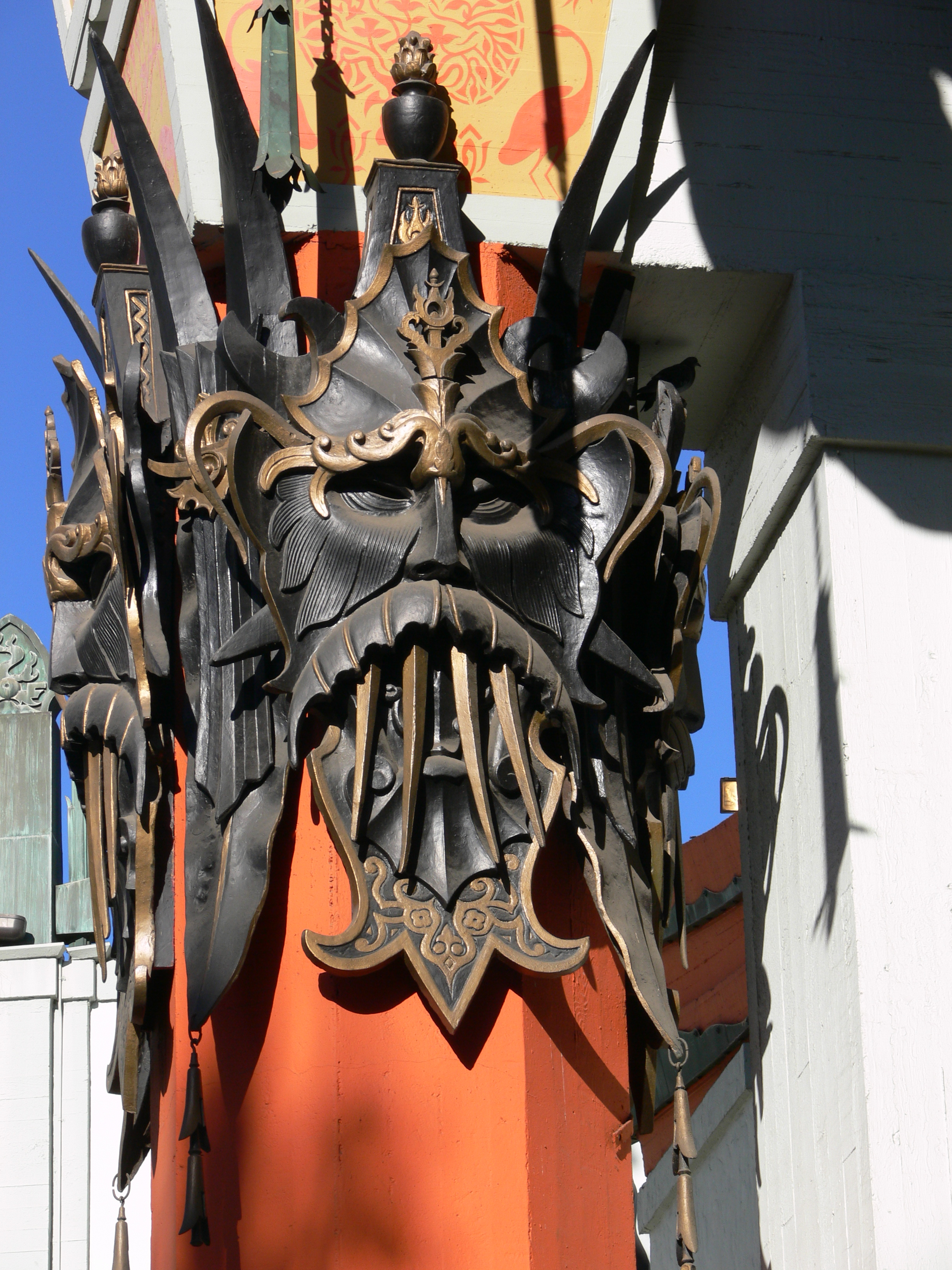
Decoration of the column

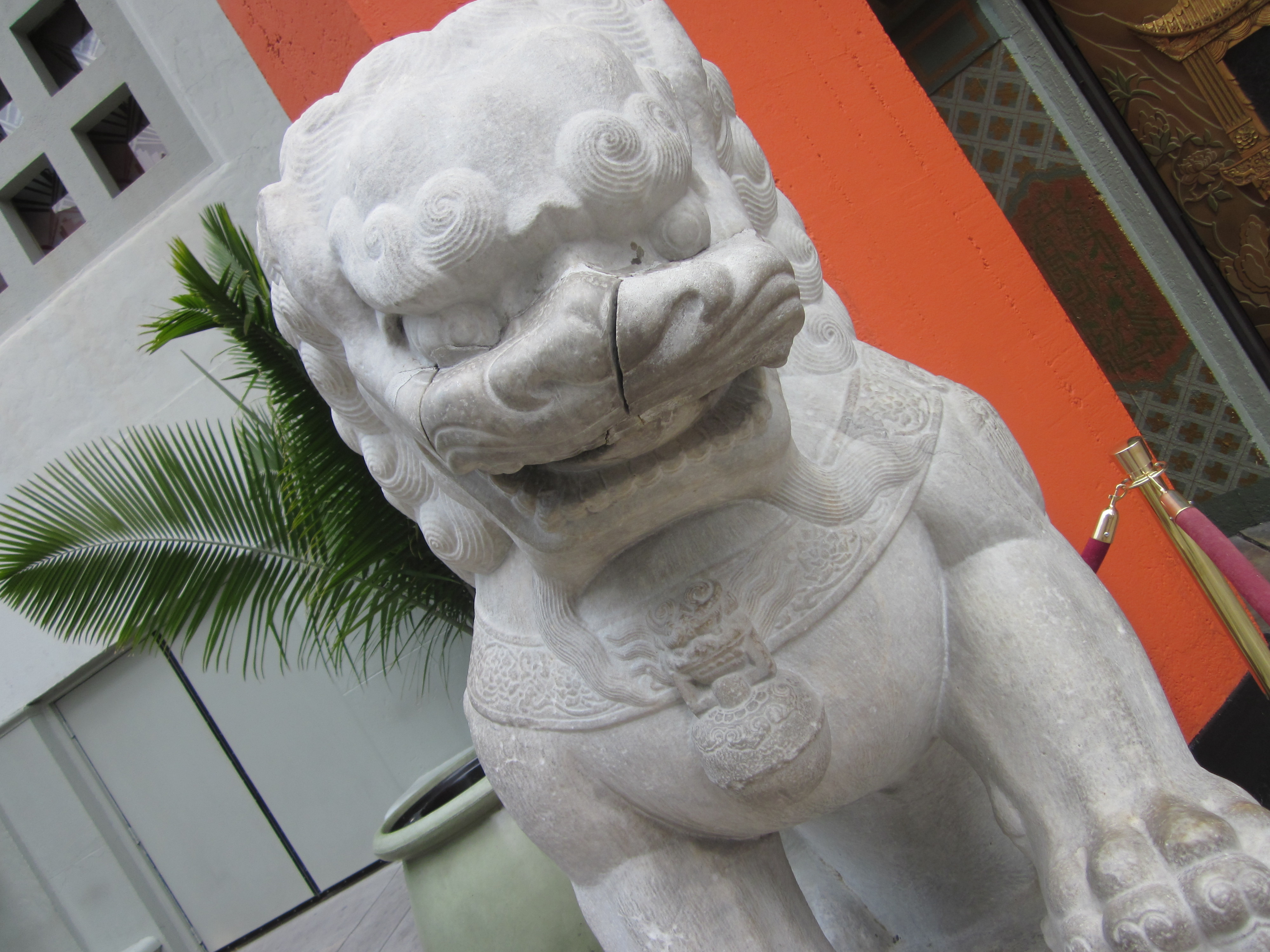
A Ming dynasty Guardian Lion statue outside Grauman's Chinese Theatre

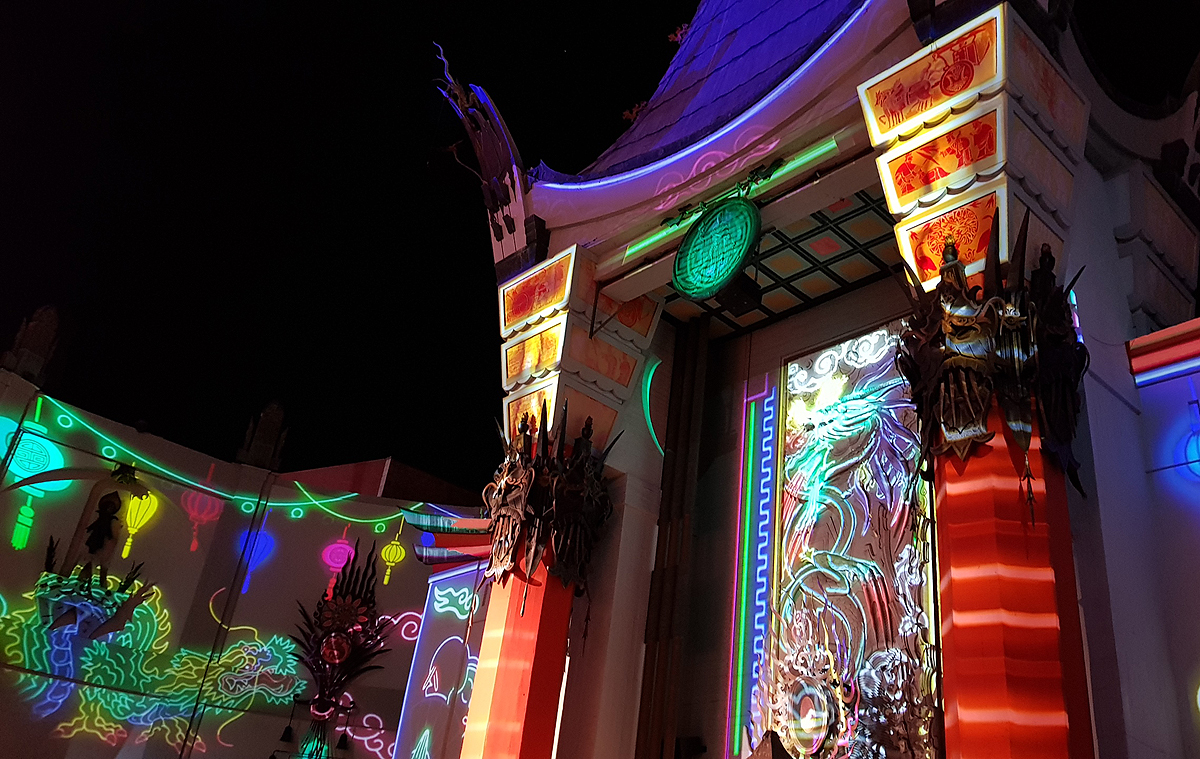
The Chinese Theatre at night

== Handprints ==
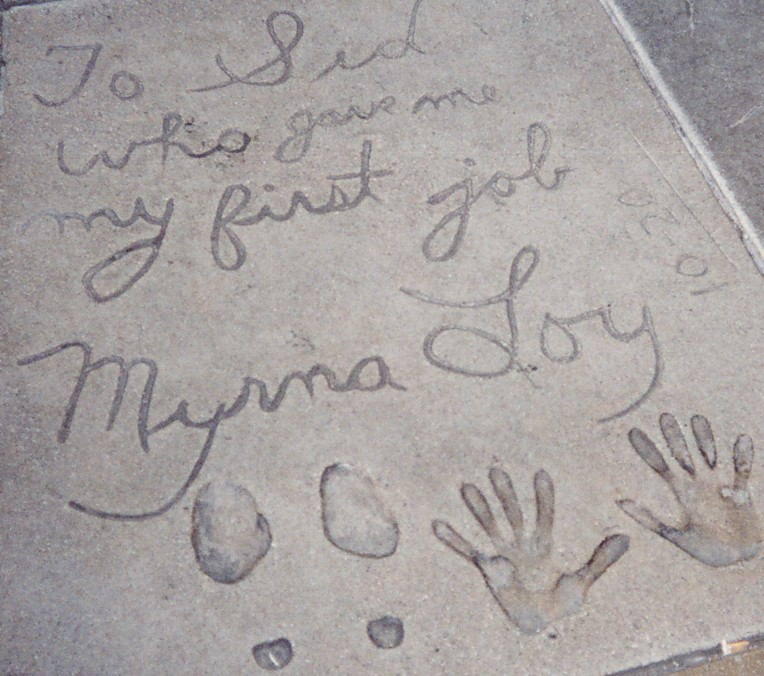
Many older entries contain personal messages to Sid Grauman, such as Myrna Loy's 1936 contribution. Loy's first job was as a dancer at the theater in the 1920s.

Nearly 200 Hollywood celebrity handprints, footprints, and autographs are in the concrete of the theater's forecourt. Fairbanks and Pickford were the first, done on April 30, 1927.

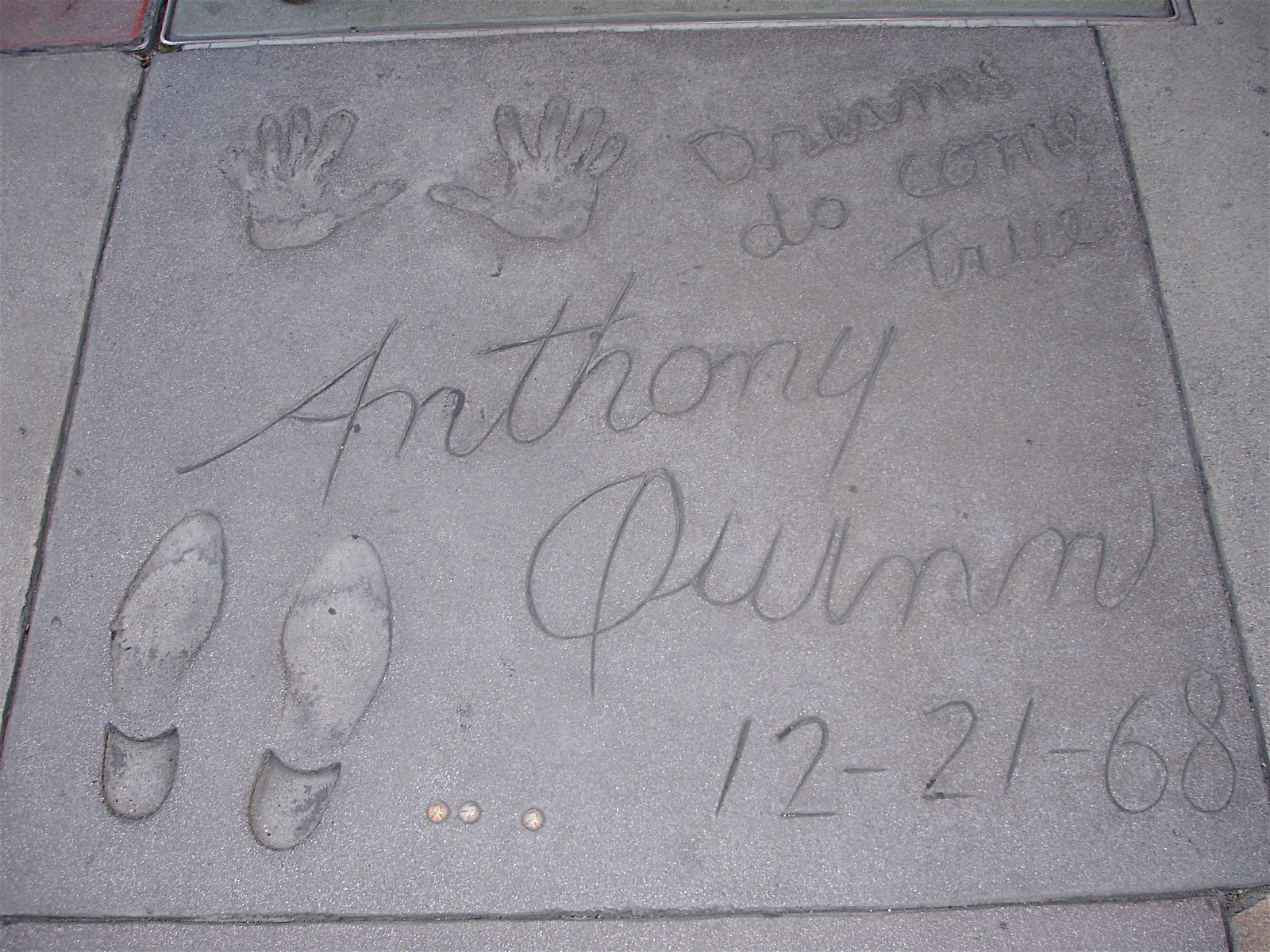
Anthony Quinn's prints outside the Chinese Theatre

Variations of this honored tradition are imprints of Harold Lloyd's eyeglasses, Groucho Marx's cigar, Whoopi Goldberg's dreadlock, the wands used by Harry Potter stars Daniel Radcliffe, Rupert Grint, and Emma Watson, John Barrymore's facial profile (reflecting his nickname "The Great Profile"), Betty Grable's leg, and Marilyn Monroe's earring.

Western stars William S. Hart and Roy Rogers left imprints of their revolvers. John Wayne left his boot and fist prints, Herbie, a Volkswagen Beetle, left the imprints of his tires. The hoofprints of Tom Mix's horse, Tony, Gene Autry's horse, Champion, and Rogers' horse, Trigger, were left in the concrete beside those of their owners.

Since 2011, a surge of concrete ceremonies has occurred, many of which have been paid for by movie studios for publicity reasons. One of the theater's current owners, Donald Kushner, acknowledged this and referred to them as mock ceremonies. This influx has been a matter of concern for film buffs and historians, as well as misleading for fans. However, despite the increase of concrete blocks, the ones placed within the forecourt are still chosen by a special committee that selects celebrities based on their contributions to Hollywood movies. Practice blocks, completed inside the theater before the ceremony, are placed on the walls of the Chinese 6 Theatre lobby, which is also used as an event space.

== IMAX conversion ==
In April 2013, owners announced plans to convert the original theater for IMAX. The new 94 ft × 46 ft (29 m × 14 m) silver screen is curved and can be masked for premieres and screening events of non-IMAX films. To accommodate better sightlines and a taller screen, seating was re-arranged in stepped rows, descending from street level to the floor of the former basement.

The auditorium's decorative walls and ceiling remain unaltered, the existing curtain was extended, decorative lighting effects were added and TCL added digital signage. The theater reopened on September 20, 2013, with the IMAX 3D version of The Wizard of Oz. Although it opened with only a digital projection system, a 70 mm IMAX projection system was installed for the runs of Interstellar and Oppenheimer in 2014 and 2023 respectively. Because of the success of the Oppenheimer run, the 70 mm projection system was kept in 2024 for the re-release of Tenet and the release of Dune: Part Two.

In April 2015, the IMAX system was upgraded to use the new dual-4K IMAX with Laser projector system for the debut of Furious 7.

== Recreations ==
A full-scale recreation of the Chinese Theatre's exterior facade and lobby exists at Disney's Hollywood Studios theme park at the Walt Disney World Resort in Bay Lake, Florida. The recreation originally housed The Great Movie Ride which opened with the park on May 1, 1989, and closed on August 13, 2017. Its replacement attraction, Mickey & Minnie's Runaway Railway, opened on March 4, 2020. It also has concrete handprints inside the sidewalks from the years 1988–1995.

A sized-down recreation of the Chinese Theatre, both interior and exterior, was built at Parque Warner Madrid theme park in San Martín de la Vega, near Madrid, Spain. The building shows films relevant to Warner Bros., previously The Lego Movie and Storks. During Halloween, horror films for guests over the age of 18 are shown such as Friday the 13th.

== In popular culture ==
=== Films ===
The Chinese Theater has appeared in multiple films set in Los Angeles, including Speed, Austin Powers in Goldmember, and Iron Man 3, as well as during the fourth wall breaks at the end of Blazing Saddles.

Janet Gaynor visits the courtyard and a number of the signatures and footprints are seen in the 1937 movie A Star is Born—including Harold Lloyd's glasses, Joe E. Brown's "mouthprint", Jean Harlow's handprints, Eddie Cantor's "eyes", Shirley Temple's "Love to you all" message, and the fictitious Norman Maine's footprints.

=== Video games ===
- In L.A. Noire (2011), the theater is a discoverable landmark.
- In Grand Theft Auto V (2013), a theater based on the Chinese Theater is named the Oriental Theater.

== See also ==
- List of Grauman's Chinese Theatre handprint ceremonies
- List of Los Angeles Historic-Cultural Monuments in Hollywood
- List of contributing properties in the Hollywood Boulevard Commercial and Entertainment District
