= Kevin Harvey =

Kevin Harvey may refer to:

- Kevin Harvey (ice hockey) (born 1984), Canadian ice hockey player
- Kevin Harvey (venture capitalist), American venture capitalist
- Kevin Harvey, actor in the TV series Good Cop
- Kevin Harvey, fictional character on the Australian soap opera Neighbours
