= Ocean Center Building =

Building in California, United States

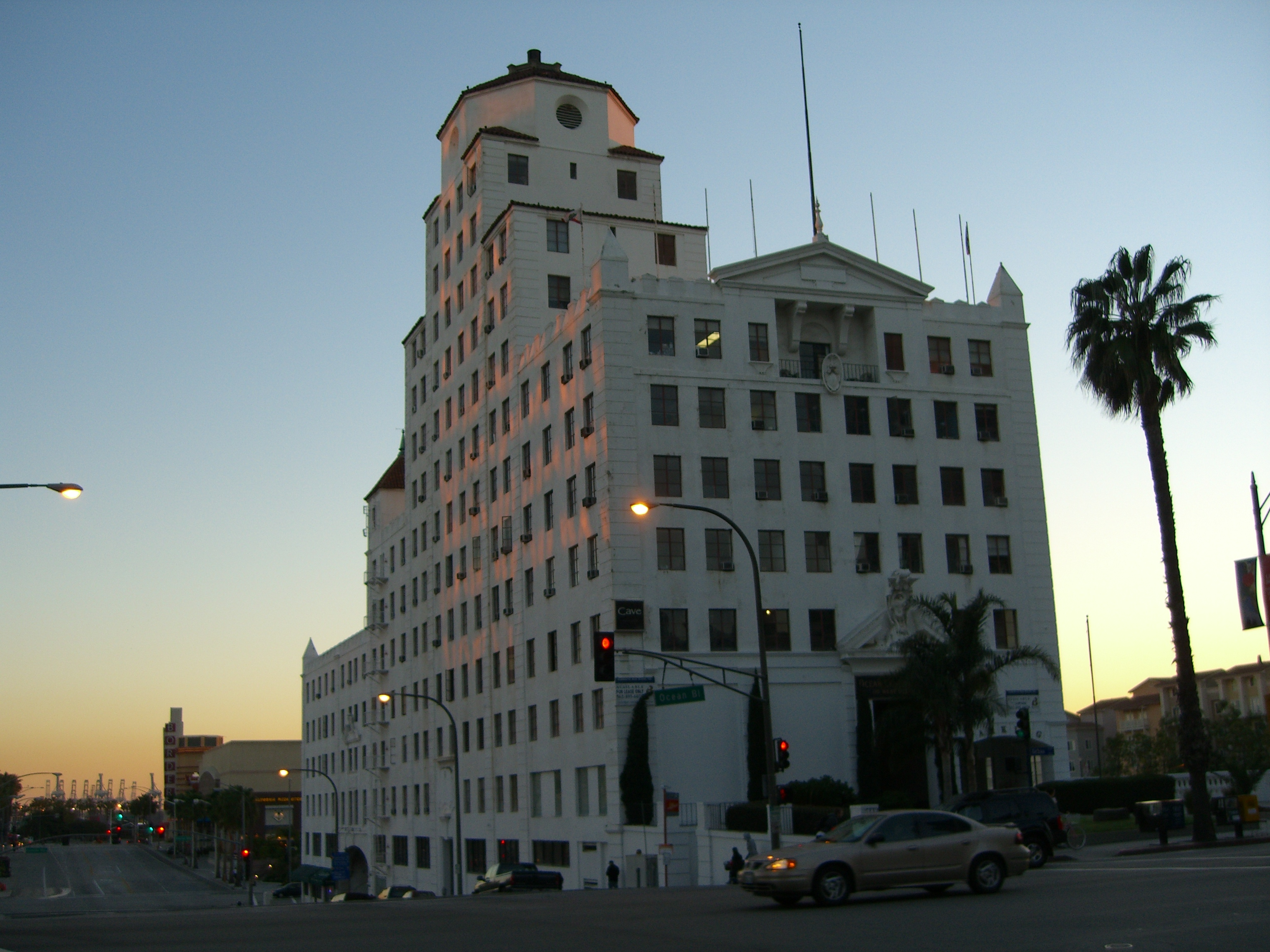

- Location within California

General information
- Location: 110 W. Ocean Blvd., Long Beach, California
- Coordinates: 33°45′59.15″N 118°11′33.36″W
- Completed: 1929

Height
- Height: 197 ft (60 m)

Technical details
- Floor count: 14

Design and construction
- Architect: Meyer & Holler design by Raymond M. Kennedy

Website
- https://www.oceancenterapartments.com/

Long Beach Historic Landmark

The Ocean Center Building is a 14-story, 197-foot-tall residential building in downtown Long Beach, California. It was built in 1929 and designed by Raymond M. Kennedy under the Los Angeles architecture firm Meyer & Holler.

== Description and architecture ==
The original layout of the Ocean Center Building had two ground floors: an entrance above the shoreline on the bluff level on 110 West Ocean Boulevard, and an east entrance at the base of the Pine Avenue incline providing beach access, and including the 'Walk of a Thousand Lights', part of The Pike amusement zone. At the time the building housed a collection of shops, offices and parking. At beach level there was a shopping arcade, a large menswear store (later the 'Hollywood on the Pike' cabaret), and several small shops up the sidewalk incline of Pine St. The rest of the building was reserved for retail and office space. The office space above the lobby was divided by varying heights of the roof, featuring rooftop balcony space for some offices, turrets, and a tower. The roofline is different when viewed from the east or west. Battlements along the different roof heights give the impression of the building as being a castle.

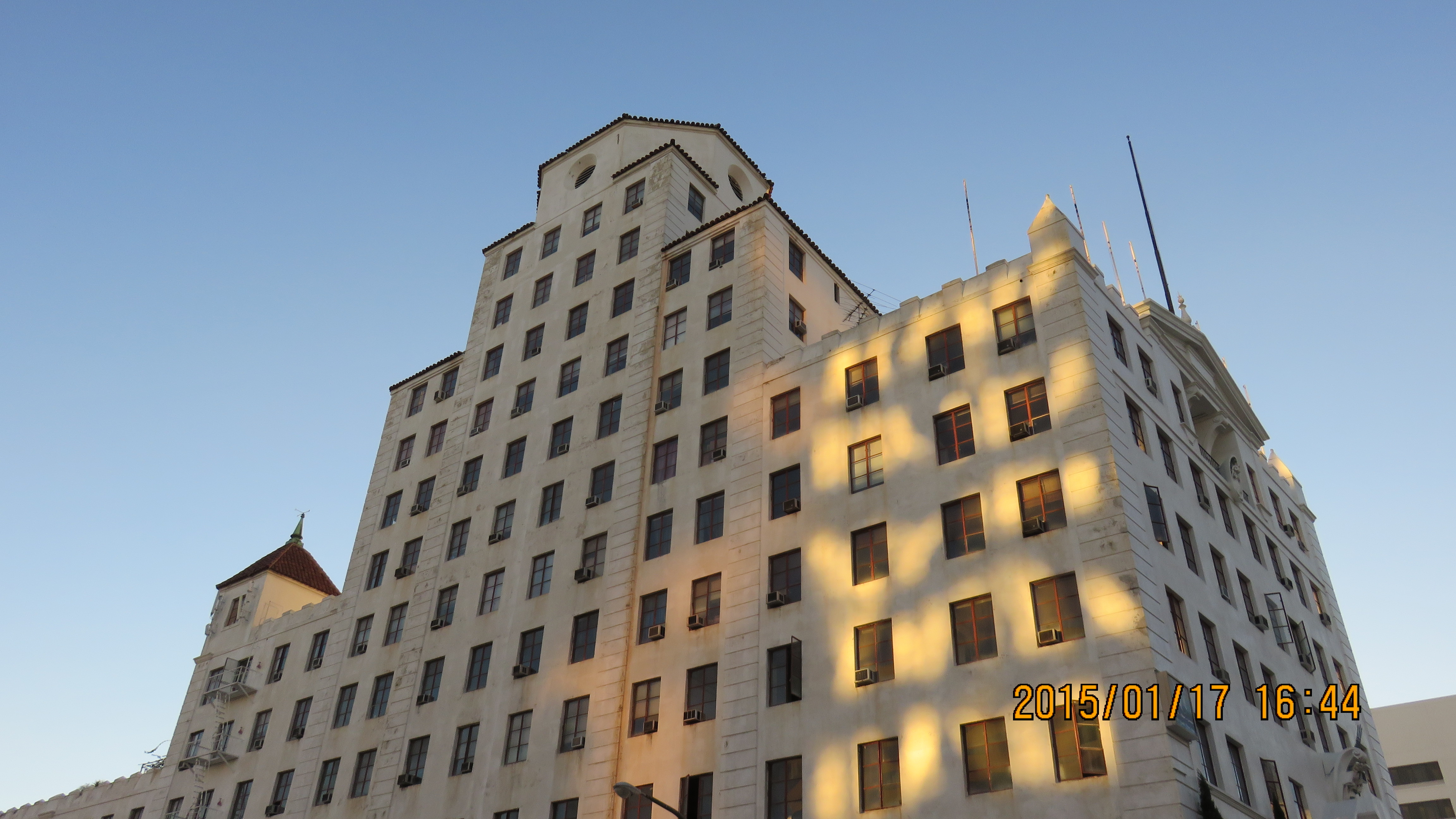
The Ocean Center Building

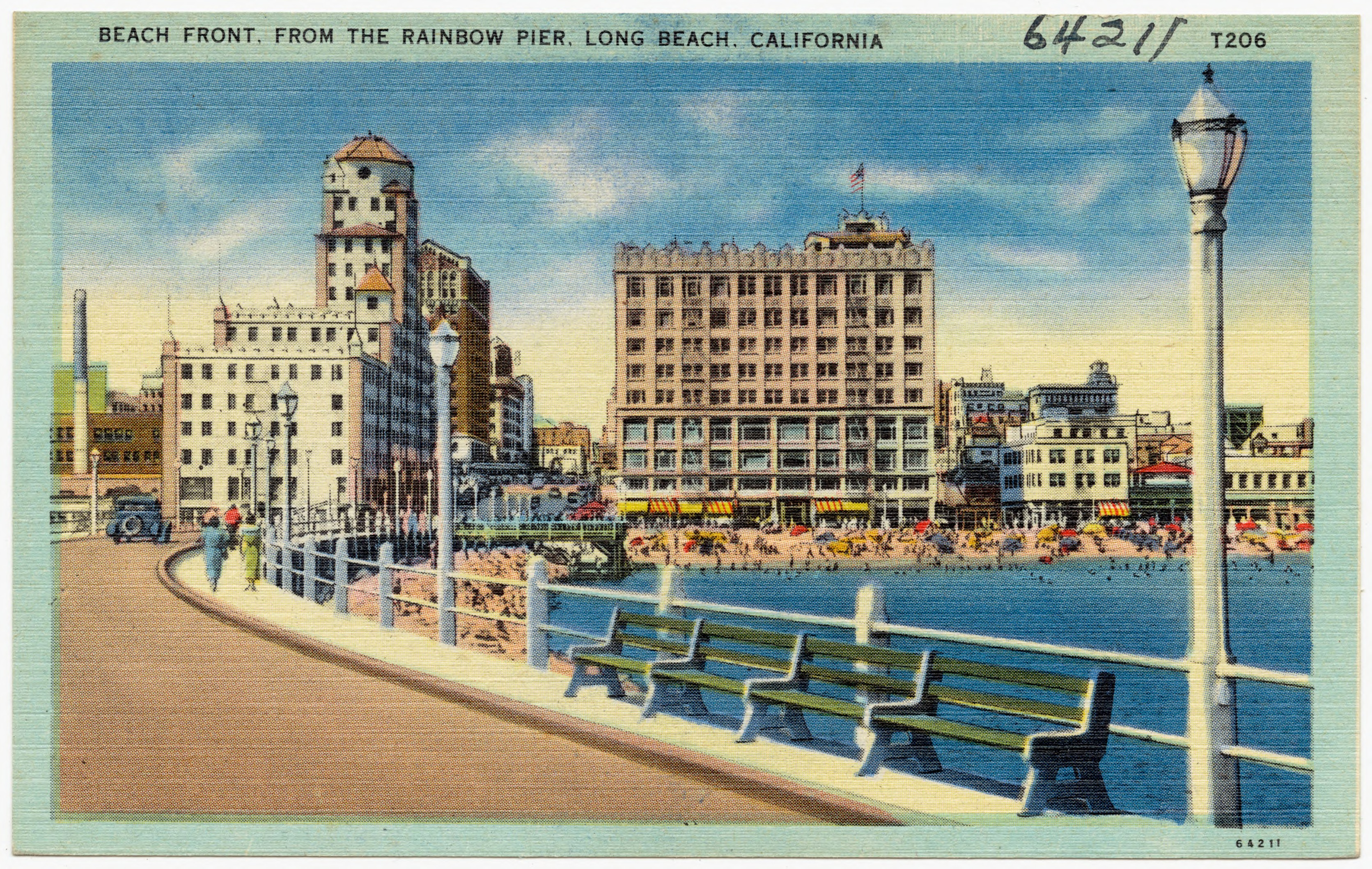
The Ocean Center Building on a postcard, circa 1930 to 1945

Though originally built next to the shoreline, there is now a long walk to the sea from the Ocean Center Building, due to various geological and engineering changes. When the Long Beach Harbor and breakwater were developed, and the Los Angeles River straightened and levied by the United States Army Corps of Engineers, the Pacific Ocean no longer swept away the alluvial granite sand, and the deposits of sandy beach gradually became wider. By the 1950s, the sand of the beach had grown so wide that the space between the shoreline and the Ocean Center Building was paved as a parking lot, and is now Seaside Way. As coastal landfill continued, Shoreline Drive and Shoreline Village were built upon the fill.

The building frontage was originally a boardwalk placed onto the sand to facilitate easier access from Pine St. and the shore end of the Long Beach Pier to the bathhouse (1902), later named The Plunge. The low-tech boardwalk was originally known as The Pike, which later came to refer to the larger entertainment zone of rides, snack stands and midway games. The area has been featured in thousands of tourist photographs, and several television shows and films, such as It's a Mad, Mad, Mad, Mad World. The boardwalk was paved in concrete and illuminated by strings of lights hung across it from the roofs of its shops and games, and later renamed the 'Walk of 1000 lights'.

The building is currently being converted from office space into residential units. In 2017, the office building was purchased by Long Beach based Pacific6 with plans for conversion to residential units. The project was started in 2019, and when finished will have approximately 80 units. The ground floor along Ocean Boulevard and Pine Avenue will house restaurants and boutiques.

== See also ==
- Jergins Trust Building
