= Jeff Jordan (venture capitalist) =

American venture capitalist

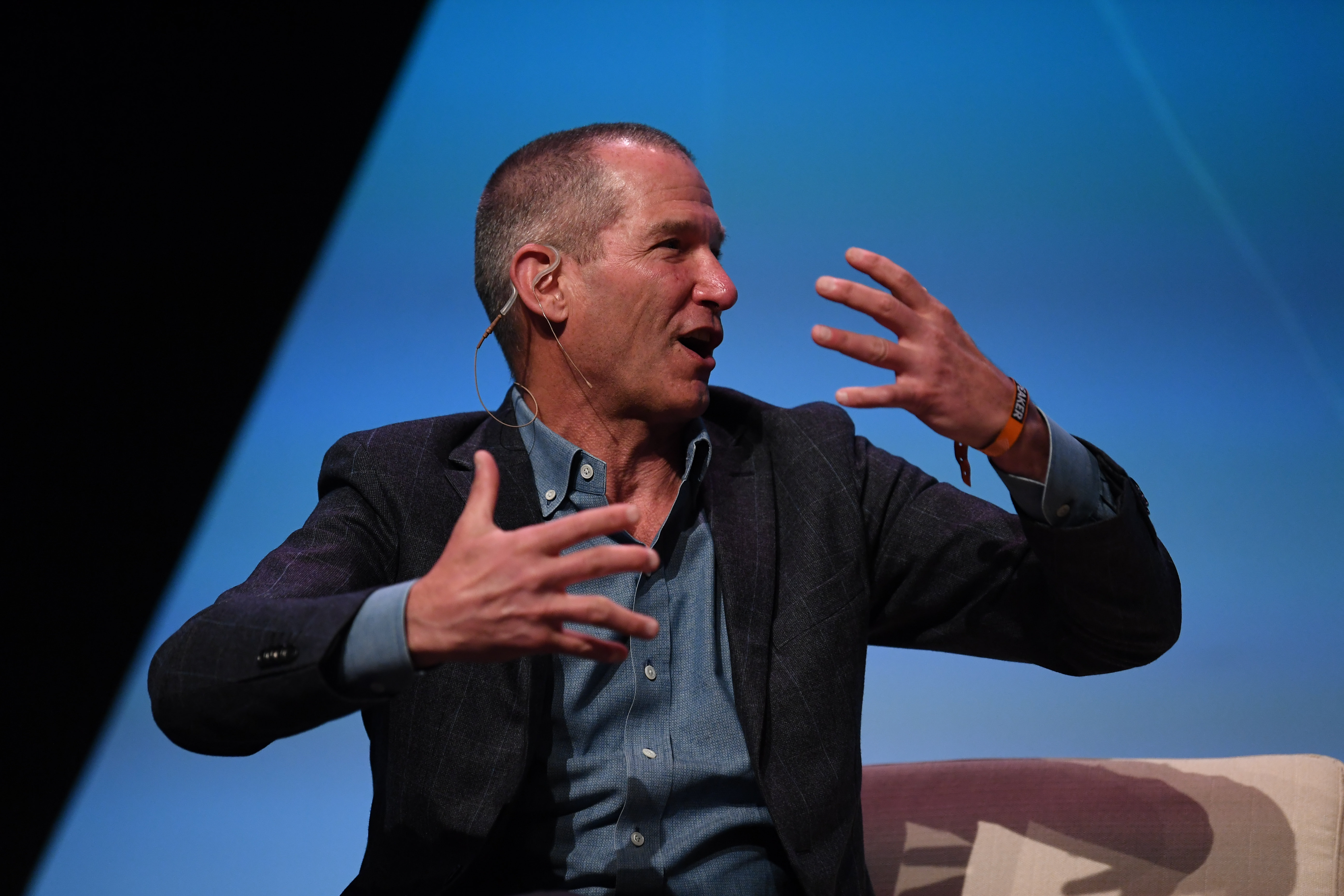
- Jordan in 2018
- Born: 1958 or 1959 (age 67–68)
- Education: Amherst College; Stanford University
- Occupation: Venture capitalist
- Known for: General Partner at Andreessen Horowitz
- Children: 2

Jeffrey D. Jordan (born 1958 or 1959) is an American venture capitalist at the Silicon Valley firm Andreessen Horowitz and the former president and CEO of OpenTable.

== Early life and education ==
Jordan was raised in Philadelphia and Washington D.C. He attended Amherst College in Massachusetts and later graduated with an MBA from Stanford University.

== Career ==
Jordan began his career in 1987 working for Boston Consulting Group in San Francisco followed by a stint at an investment bank in Los Angeles. From 2004 to 2006, Jordan served as the president of PayPal. Prior to that, Jordan was senior vice president and general manager at eBay North America for five years, where he ran eBay.com and led eBay’s acquisitions of PayPal and Half.com. Before eBay, Jordan held various executive roles at Hollywood Entertainment (CFO) and The Walt Disney Company. Prior to his stint at the Walt Disney Company, Jordan was a management consultant at the Boston Consulting Group upon graduating from the Stanford Graduate School of Business.

Jordan was president and CEO of OpenTable from 2007 to 2011. In May 2009, OpenTable’s initial public offering raised $31.4 million, giving the company a market capitalization of $432 million. OpenTable shares rose 72 percent during its first day of trading on NASDAQ and its IPO was considered an “extremely healthy” one during the economic recession.

Jordan has also served on the board of directors for OpenTable, Wealthfront and Zoosk. In June 2017, he joined the Cadre board, a real estate investing company Andreessen Horowitz is investing in. He's also been an active investor and adviser in Silicon Valley for several years, with involvements in Pure Digital (the maker of the Flip Video camera later acquired by Cisco), Hotwire.com (acquired by Expedia), Tiny Prints (acquired by Shutterfly) and CafePress (which went public in 2012).

=== Andreessen Horowitz ===
Jordan became Andreessen Horowitz’s fifth general partner in June 2011. In July 2011, Jordan led Airbnb’s $112 million Series B funding from a group of investors including Andreessen Horowitz; he also serves on their board. Jordan’s additional board seats on behalf of Andreessen Horowitz include Belly, Circle, Tilt.com, Fab.com, Instacart, Lookout, Twice, Walker & Co., 500px, Accolade and Pinterest. Jordan also oversees the firm’s investments in Fanatics, Julep and Zulily.

== Personal life ==
Jordan married his Stanford classmate, Karen Shishino, with whom he has twin children.
