= Adam Nash (executive) =

American Executive

- Education: Stanford University (BS, MS); Harvard Business School (MBA)
- Occupation: Technology executive
- Years active: 1990s–present
- Employer: Daffy
- Known for: Former president and CEO of Wealthfront; executive roles at LinkedIn, eBay, and Apple

Adam Nash is the CEO and co-founder of Daffy, a fintech platform focused on simplifying charitable giving through donor-advised funds.

Nash has invested in companies including Firebase, Figma, Gusto, and Opendoor. His investments are geared towards making financial tools more accessible to the public via tech-enabled products. Nash's interest in democratizing access to technology and its communities extends through his non-profit work starting in 2011 with Oshman Family JCC and most recently as the co-chairman of ICON, a non-profit organization.

== Early life and education ==
Adam Nash was born and raised in Silicon Valley. During high school Nash did speech, cheer, and debate and was state-ranked in California for Impromptu speaking. In 1990, he did an internship at NASA Ames Research Center where he worked on fluid-dynamics simulations in software.

Nash earned a bachelor's and master's degree in computer science from Stanford University and an MBA from Harvard Business School.

== Career ==
After college, Nash began working as a software engineer on the WebObjects team, originally a part of NeXT, a computer company acquired by Apple. After working for Apple, Nash began working for a start-up company called Preview Systems, and began his MBA at Harvard Business School in 1999. After business school Nash worked in venture capital for two years, before becoming a product manager for eBay. He eventually became the Director of eBay Express, a website that focused on fixed-price products.

Nash continued his career in product management as vice president of product management at LinkedIn in 2007. He originally led LinkedIn's core product and user experience team, and then led LinkedIn's platform and mobile products, including the open developer platform and their native applications and mobile web experiences. He founded LinkedIn Hackdays, a seminal program aimed at driving the innovation culture at the company. He left LinkedIn to join Greylock Partners in October 2011 as an executive in residence, where he advised the leadership teams of the firm's consumer technology companies and evaluated new investment opportunities.

In January 2013, Nash joined Wealthfront, an automated investment service, as COO. At the time, Wealthfront had less than $100M in client assets under management. Nash became CEO of Wealthfront in January 2014, staying with the company through December 2016.

In September 2017, Nash became an adjunct lecturer in the Computer Science department at Stanford University, teaching the original seminar, "CS 007: Introduction to Personal Finance". In 2018, he joined Dropbox as Vice President of Product & Growth. Nash left Dropbox in February 2020 to focus on building a new company combining his fintech expertise with his non-profit interests with co-founder Alejandro Crosa.

In September 2021, Nash launched Daffy, the Donor-Advised Fund for You, a not-for-profit community built around a new, modern platform for giving.

== Investor ==
Nash has invested in consumer software, marketplaces, and fintech. He began his advisory roles in 2010 as a mentor at 500 Startups. He was also a mentor at MuckerLab from 2011 to 2014. Nash was an advisor to Marin Software and Covexum and currently advises LoanSnap, Bitwise Asset Management, Raisin GmbH, and Gusto. Nash previously served as a member of the board of directors in an observer capacity at Wrapp and PullString, and currently serves on the board of directors for Acorns (has filed to go public) and Shift (public in 2020).

Nash has invested in companies including Firebase, Figma, Gusto, and Opendoor.

== Philanthropic efforts ==
Nash served for six years on the board of directors for Oshman Family JCC, a hub for the Silicon Valley Jewish community aimed at creating inclusive and meaningful experiences to incorporate innovation into modern life.

== Personal life ==
Nash is the oldest of four siblings. His father is an OB/GYN and his mother serves as Clinical Faculty with the Psychiatry Department at Stanford University. He was born and raised in Silicon Valley where he lives with his wife and four children.
