= Raymond M. Kennedy =

Raymond McCormick Kennedy
- Illustration of Kennedy as a Cornell University student, c. 1915
- Born: 1891; New Brighton, Pennsylvania, U.S.
- Died: May 11, 1976 (aged 84-85); Glendale, California, U.S.
- Education: Cornell University
- Occupation: Architect
- Buildings: Grauman's Chinese Theater; Fox Fullerton Theatre; Ocean Center Building

Raymond McCormick Kennedy (1891–1976) was the guiding light and architect of the Grauman's Chinese Theater that opened in May 1927.

== Early life and education ==
Kennedy was born in New Brighton, Pennsylvania, in 1891 to Thomas and Geneva Kennedy. He graduated from Cornell University in 1915 at the top of his class with a Bachelor's degree in Architecture for which he received the American Institute of Architects Medal for General Excellence in Architecture. At this time he was also awarded the John Plaut Fellowship which paid for his return to Cornell for post graduate work. In 1916 Kennedy earned his Master's in Architecture at Cornell. Upon his completion of this degree he was awarded the Rome Prize Scholarship in Architecture. This coveted prize entitled the recipient to three years of resident study at the Academy in Rome and included a stipend to cover expenses. His studies in Italy were interrupted by World War I. He volunteered to serve for the American Red Cross of Italy. This service delayed his studies in Rome for a year. While in Rome he completed several classically styled projects and in 1920 he was awarded the Diploma as a Fellow of the American Academy in Rome.

Kennedy returned from his studies in Italy in 1920. He obtained his first employment with the firm of York and Sawyer in New York City. However, the prevailing architectural design philosophy of this firm gave Kennedy no opportunity to express his creative and artistic talents. Subsequently Kennedy had a more rewarding design opportunity with the Greenley firm in New York.

== Meyer & Holler ==
His employment was to be short lived however since in 1920 Kennedy accepted the position of architectural designer within the "design and build" firm of Meyer & Holler in Los Angeles, California. In this position he began an expanded activity in his career. While associated with Meyer & Holler, Kennedy was able to leave his mark on the architectural landscape of early modern Los Angeles. In 1929 the firm of Meyer & Holler was greatly impacted by the Great Depression. The decline in real estate values and dramatically lowered demand for construction in general brought to an end the operations of Meyer & Holler.

Kennedy's Rendering of The Chinese Theater.

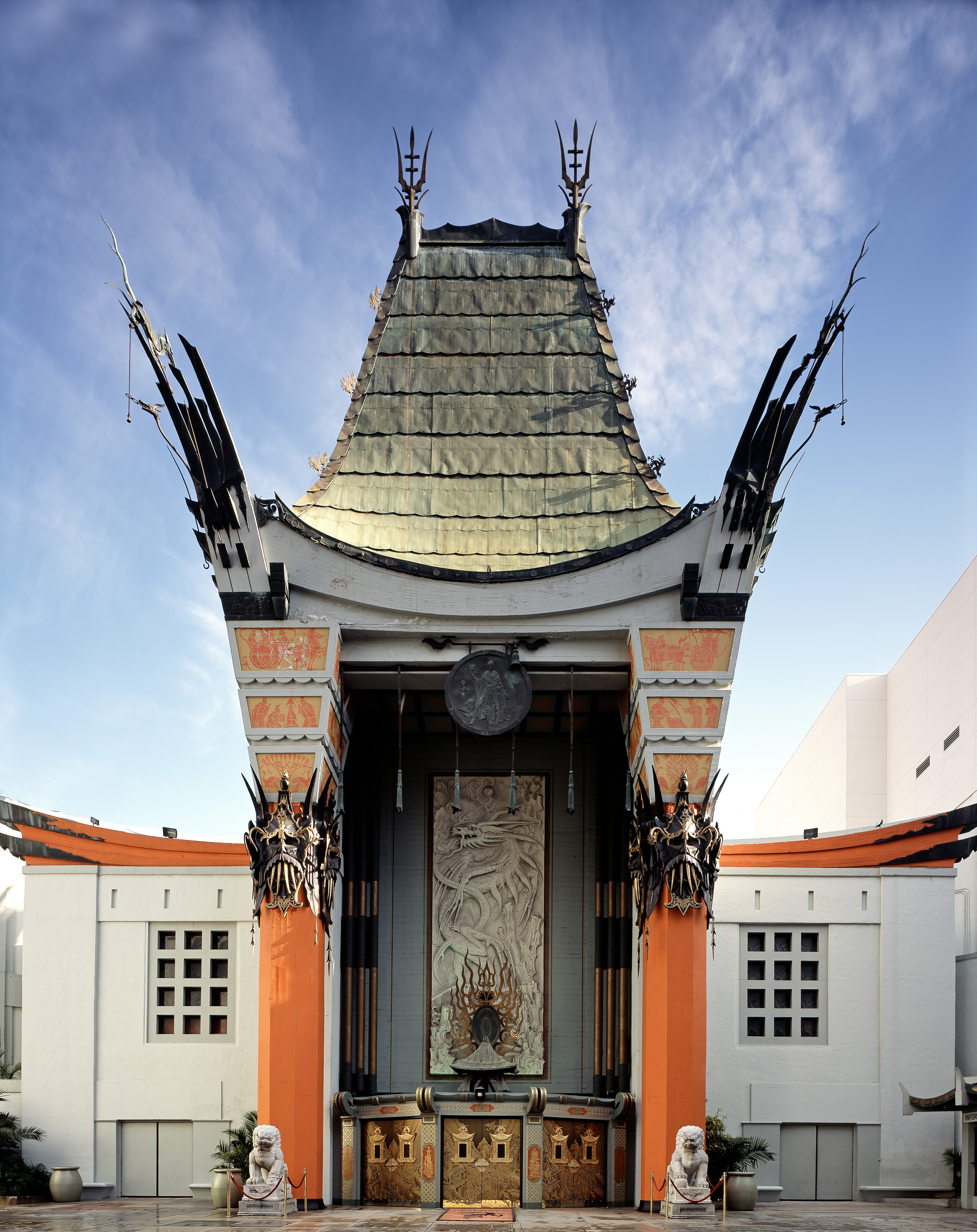
Mann's Chinese Theatre, forecourt and facade.

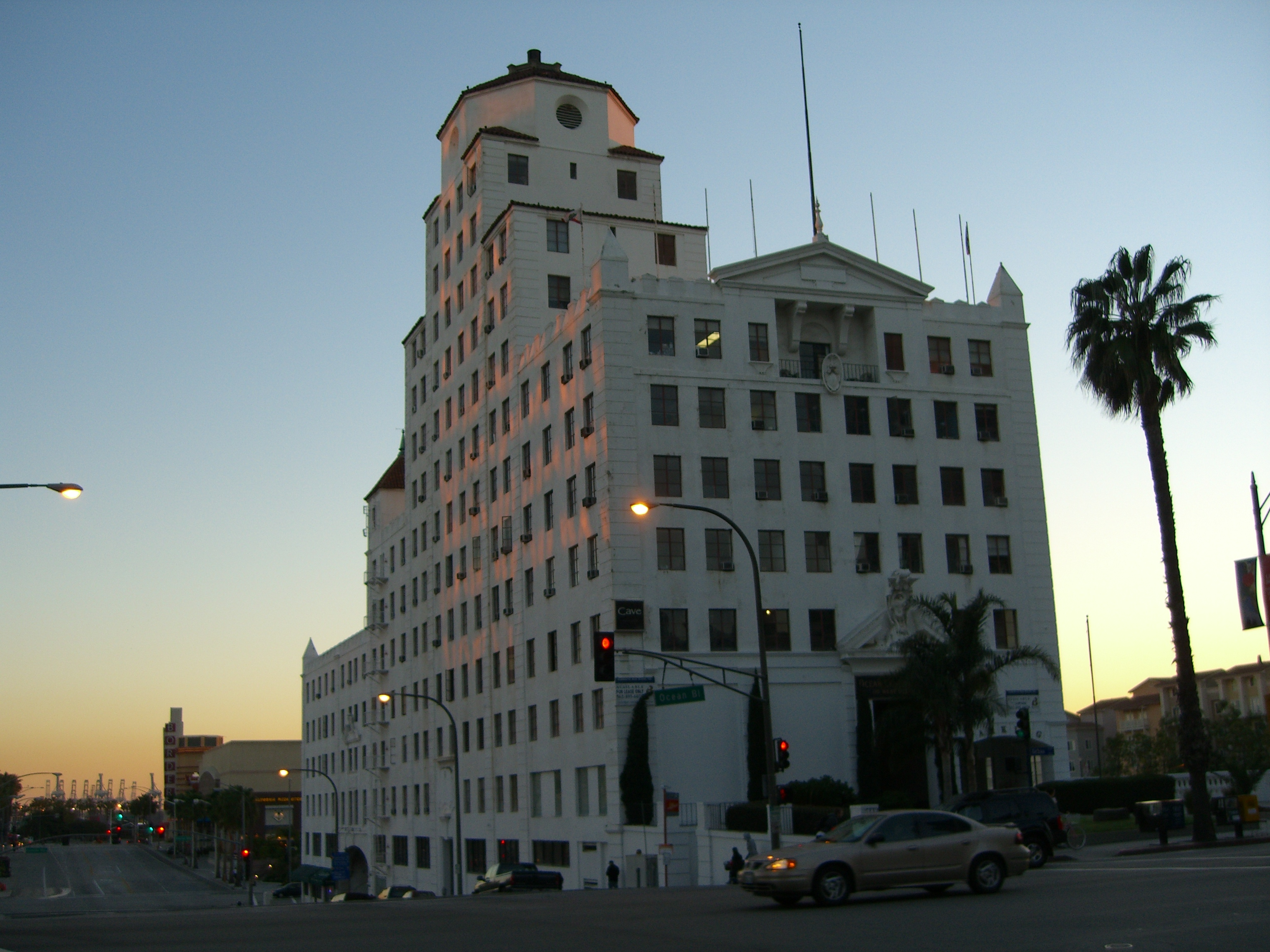
Ocean Center Building, Long Beach, CA - view SSW at dawn.

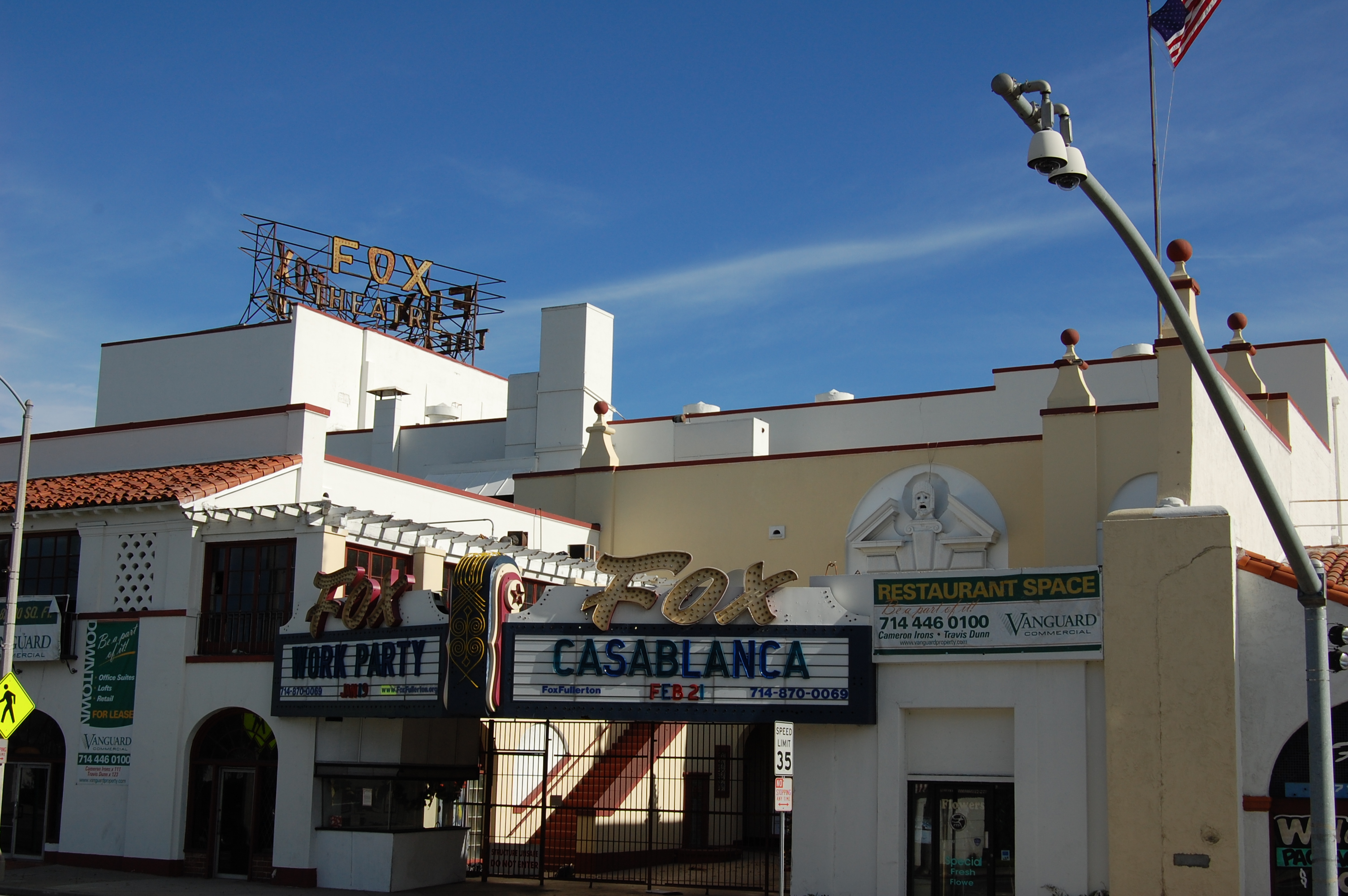
Fox theatre, Fullerton, CA

=== Selected buildings ===
- First Church Christian Scientists, Los Angeles
- First Church Christian Scientists, Glendale
- Fox Theatre (Fullerton), Fullerton
- Grauman's Chinese Theater, Hollywood
- Hollywood National Building, Hollywood
- International Mart Building, Los Angeles
- Ocean Center Building, Long Beach
- Petroleum Securities Building, Los Angeles
- Quinby Office Building, Los Angeles
- Twenty Sixth Church of Christian Scientists, Los Angeles

=== Grauman's Chinese Theater ===
The Chinese Theater has taken a significant place in world architectural history and an iconic part of Hollywood. Kennedy was responsible for 99% of all sketches made of the architectural features for the theater that was developed by his employer, Meyer and Holler. Meyer and Holler was the design-build firm that had already built Grauman's Egyptian Theatre for Sid Grauman. The ground breaking for the Chinese took place on January 5, 1926, and the construction was to be completed by December 28, 1926. The grand opening of Grauman's Chinese Theater in Hollywood, California, was on May 18, 1927, and was the most spectacular theater opening in motion picture history.

Kennedy's design of the theater displayed his classical, sophisticated training and his exuberant use of color and unique styles. Kennedy, along with fellow architect Donald Wilkinson, arranged the forecourt and facade of the Chinese theater to echo the layout of the Piazza San Pietro and the massing of Sant'Andrea al Quirinale in Rome, respectively. He thus managed to subtly associate the function of the movie theater with that of sacred space, thereby helping to legitimize the cinema at a time when its morality was being questioned.

== University of Southern California ==
Kennedy left the defunct firm of Meyer & Holler and secured a teaching position at the University of Southern California. His major position was professor of architectural design but he also conducted classes in mural painting, free hand sketching, and architectural modeling. His architectural students flourished under his tutelage and subsequently won many design awards. He became one of their favorite professors and was invited to many student reunions as a featured speaker. Teaching assignments for Kennedy were scheduled in the afternoons which left the mornings free for other employment. In the mornings he would design sets for the movie studios of Metro Goldwyn Mayer and Republic Studios.

Raymond McCormick Kennedy

== Post USC ==
His teaching work at U.S.C. was interrupted during September and October 1941 when he left to be a Consulting Architect on the design of the future Pentagon in Washington, D.C.

At the completion of his employment at the University of Southern California in 1942, Kennedy again became active in strictly architectural work. This activity was divided between the offices of Robert E. Bennett of Pasadena and William H. Harrison of Los Angeles. In association with these two firms, Kennedy worked on many other projects including libraries, schools, a city hall, and a chapel.

Kennedy retired at the age of 69 in 1960. During his retirement years Kennedy enthusiastically pursued his many hobbies of model railroads, woodworking, travel, photography, painting and writing. He was an avid reader with a romantic appreciation of poetry and music.

== Death ==
At the age of 85, on May 11, 1976, Kennedy died leaving his wife Myrtle, two sons, Raymond Kennedy Jr., Thomas Kennedy, and a multitude of aesthetically pleasing and functional buildings in Southern California.
