= VoloMetrix =

American subsidiary of Microsoft

VoloMetrix, Inc.
- Website type: Subsidiary
- Founded: 2011; 15 years ago
- Headquarters: Seattle, Washington, US
- Chairperson: Chris Brahm
- CEO: Ryan Fuller
- Products: Software as a service
- Parent: Microsoft Corporation
- Website: www.VoloMetrix.com

VoloMetrix, Inc. is an American subsidiary of Microsoft that sells analytics software. Based in Seattle, Washington, VoloMetrix extracts and analyzes anonymous data from collaboration platforms to create data visualizations and dashboards.

== History ==
The company was founded in 2011 by CEO Ryan Fuller, and Chris Brahm, a senior partner and director at Bain & Company.

In April 2013, the company raised $3.3M (~$4.49 million in 2025) in series A funding from Shasta Ventures.

In August 2014, VoloMetrix publicly announced that it had filed a patent for its proprietary technology and associated metrics.

In October 2014, VoloMetrix announced a series B funding round with Shasta Ventures and Split Rock Partners that raised $12 million.

In September 2015, Microsoft announced that it had acquired the company, but did not disclose the amount.

=== Metrics ===
VoloMetrix's key organizational metrics include Organizational Load Index (OLI), Fragmentation, Network Efficiency Index, and other measures aimed at improving employee performance. Metrics provided by VoloMetrix include:

- Organizational Load Index: number of hours a person consumes from the rest of the organization based on meetings they organize and emails they send
- 1:1 Manager Interactions: number of hours per week spent in meetings involving only an individual and the individual's direct supervisor during a given time period
- Time in Meetings: number of hours per week spent in meetings during a given time period
