= Jergins Trust Building =

- Interactive map of the Jergins Trust Building area
- Former names: Markwell Building

General information
- Architectural style: Beaux-Arts
- Location: Long Beach, California, United States
- Coordinates: 33°45′59″N 118°11′31″W
- Year built: 1919
- Renovated: 1929
- Demolished: 1988

Technical details
- Floor count: 10

The Jergins Trust Building was a 10-story Beaux-Arts style commercial building in Long Beach, California, built in 1919. The building contained office space and a ground-floor theatre and was known for its façade featuring terra-cotta shields and gargoyles. In spite of being one of Long Beach's designated historic landmarks, the building was demolished in 1988.

== History ==
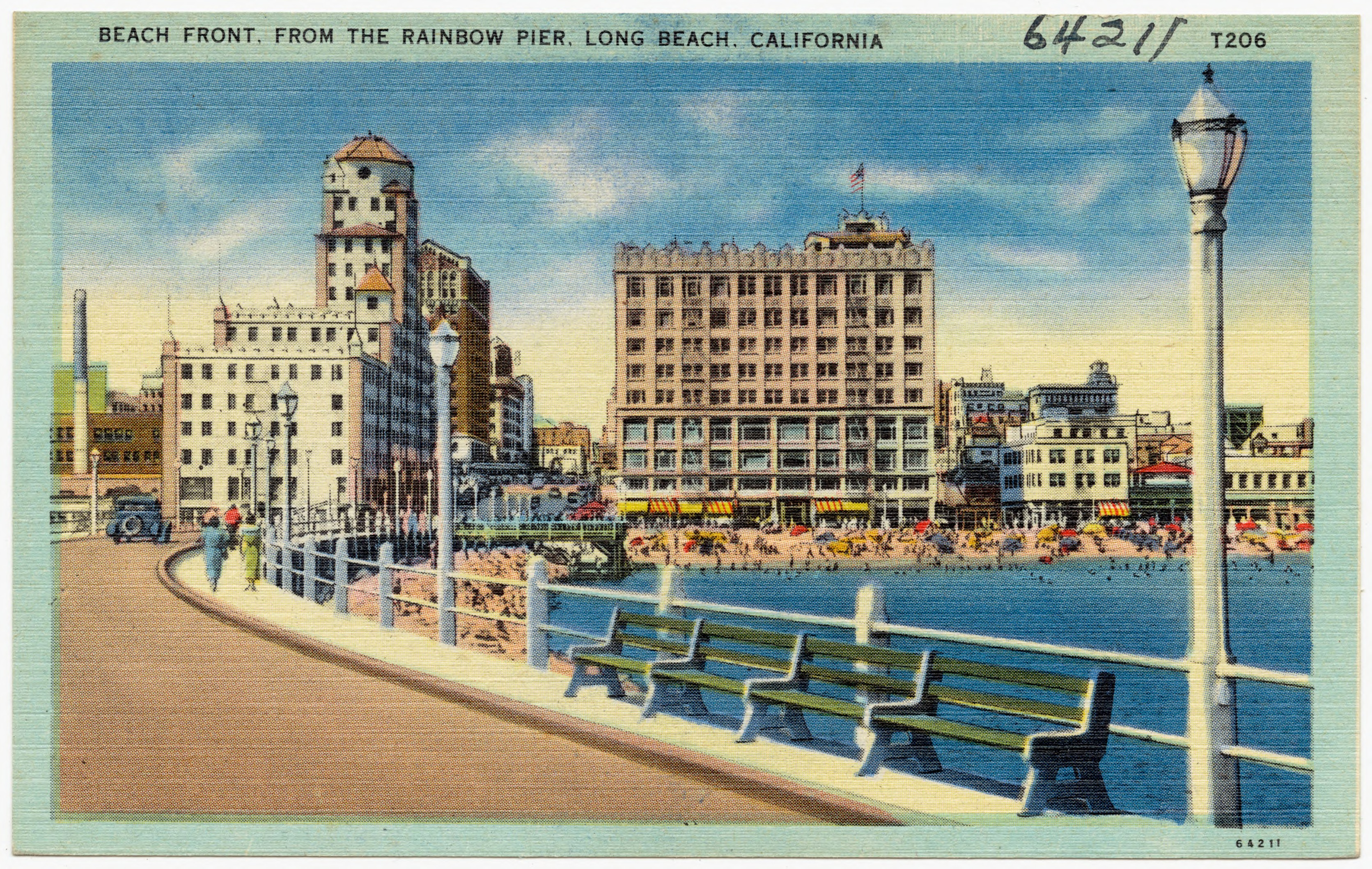
The building depicted on a postcard from the now-also demolished Rainbow Pier.

First known as the Markwell Building after its founder and designed in the Beaux-Arts style, the building was built in 1919 and initially included six stories and a theatre which hosted acts such as Fred Astaire. The building was sold in 1925 to A.T. Jergins, who added four additional stories to the building in 1929. The first Superior Court branch in California occupied space in the building.

The building featured an international arcade on its lowest floor. The building's arcade was connected to the beach in 1927 by a 181-foot (55 m) long tunnel under Ocean Boulevard designed to protect pedestrians from the busy road. The tunnel was used until 1967, when the Ocean Boulevard was widened and the tunnel sealed off.

The building was designated a Long Beach Historic Landmark in 1979, but was not added to the historic register.

In the mid-1980s, the building's owners planned to demolish it to build a new 20-story hotel. A preservation group hired a developer to create a proposal for redevelopment that included saving the old building, but their efforts were unsuccessful. The final demolition permit was granted by Long Beach in November 1987 and the building was torn down in 1988.

After the demolition, the owners never built the hotel and the site stood vacant. The building's demolition, along with the loss of several other historic buildings (including the Pacific Coast Club) during the 1980s, inspired the preservationist movement in Long Beach.

Two of the building's ornamental pillars were repurposed as an entry gate for the Drake Chavez Greenbelt Park in the Willmore neighborhood.

== Culture ==
The pedestrian tunnel which connected the building with the beach is the subject of the Lana Del Rey song "Did You Know That There's a Tunnel Under Ocean Blvd". Less than a year after the song was released, it was announced that the Jergins Tunnel will reopen as a speakeasy which will be part of a new Hard Rock Hotel. The project will be completed in 2027, one year prior to the 2028 Summer Olympics.

A historical marker commemorating the building was erected in 2012.

== See also ==
- Ocean Center Building
