= Shasta Ventures =

- Industry: Venture capital
- Founded: 2004
- Founder: Rob Coneybeer, Ravi Mohan
- Headquarters: Menlo Park, California
- Website: shastaventures.com

Shasta Ventures is an early-stage venture capital investment firm located in Silicon Valley that invests in enterprise and technology consumer startups. It is located on Sand Hill Road in Menlo Park.

== Funds ==
Shasta's second fund of US$250 million included Nest Labs, which almost all by itself repaid the entire fund when it was sold to Google for $3.2 billion. Shasta's third fund of $265 million was announced in September 2011. The fourth fund, of $300 million, was announced in June 2014.

== Investment philosophy ==
Shasta was originally focused on companies in the consumer technology space, with then managing director Tod Francis calling Mint.com a "classic Shasta" investment in September 2011.

In September 2013, Rob Coneybeer of Shasta, the new managing director, said that he was betting big on hardware startups, citing Moore's Law-style continued performance improvements making opportunities for new hardware possible.

== Companies ==
=== Mint.com ===
Shasta Ventures was an early investor in Mint.com, an online personal finance management service that was bought in September 2009 by financial software company Intuit for US$170 million in cash. An article by Alexia Tsotsis for TechCrunch quoted Shasta's managing director Tod Francis as using the phrase "Classic Shasta" to describe Shasta's investment in Mint.com.

=== Nest Labs ===
Shasta Ventures and Kleiner Perkins Caufield & Byers were the only investors in the Series A round for Nest Labs (the home automation company) in September 2010. When Google later bought Nest Labs for US$3.2 billion in January 2014, Shasta had a net gain of about $200 million, enough to pay out "almost all" of the $250 million Shasta II fund.

=== Other investments ===
Shasta has invested in a number of other companies such as Anaplan, Brandcast, Entelo, Leanplum, Nextdoor, Lithium Technologies, Logoworks, Zuora, Tally Technologies, Spiceworks, Stealth Security, and VoloMetrix.

== Controversy ==
In August 2019 partner Doug Pepper left the firm, potentially triggering a "key-man" event
