= Logoworks =

Online graphic design company

- Industry: Professional Graphic Design services
- Founded: 2001; 25 years ago
- Founder: Morgan Lynch
- Headquarters: New Bern, North Carolina, U.S.
- Area served: Worldwide
- Key people: Aaron Bernabi, President
- Website: logoworks.com

Logoworks is an online graphic design company that specializes in logo design, web design, and other advertising services primarily for small businesses and startups. The company offers graphic design and related services to its customers through an interactive online process that connects customers with Logoworks’ proprietary designer community.

== History ==
The company was founded in 2001 by Morgan Lynch and Joey Dempster. In 2005, Logoworks received $9.3 million in funding from Benchmark Capital. The company has also received venture funding from Highway 12 and Shasta Ventures. Until 2006, Logoworks was operated under privately held company, Arteis. Arteis manages Logoworks's (and other related companies') graphic designers. In April 2007, Arteis was acquired by Hewlett-Packard.

Three months after HP temporarily shut down activity in April 2012, OldSlip Group acquired Logoworks and restarted operations in September 2012. The current management team is composed of several former Logoworks employees, and members of the former Logoworks design community.

As of December 2018, Logoworks is currently owned and operated by BK Creative LLC, a New Bern, North Carolina–based firm.

== Services ==
Logoworks clients are assigned several graphic designers, who offer multiple logo options for the client to choose from. Designers working for the firm are internally rated, which determines the number and type of projects they can work on. Currently, Logoworks employs both internal and freelance designers.

Although Logoworks’ initial focus was logo design, it also provides other graphic design services such as business cards, social media, websites, brochures, postcards, posters, and infographics. In addition, Logoworks offers printing services.
