= Benchmark (venture capital firm) =

American venture capital firm

- Type: Private
- Industry: Venture capital
- Founded: 1995; 31 years ago
- Founder: Bob Kagle; Bruce Dunlevie; Andy Rachleff; Kevin Harvey; Val Vaden
- Headquarters: 140 New Montgomery; San Francisco, California, United States
- Key people: Peter Fenton, General Partner; Eric Vishria, General Partner; Chetan Puttagunta, General Partner; Jack Altman, General Partner; Everett Randle, General Partner; Sarah Tavel, Venture Partner
- Website: www.benchmark.com

Benchmark Capital Advisors LLC (commonly known as Benchmark) is an American venture capital firm founded in 1995 by Bob Kagle, Bruce Dunlevie, Andy Rachleff, Kevin Harvey, and Val Vaden. The firm is known for its equal partnership structure and focus on early-stage investing, typically leading the first institutional round of funding while taking a board seat with each company it invests in.

== Founding, partner structure ==
Benchmark was founded in 1995 by five partners: Bob Kagle, Bruce Dunlevie, Andy Rachleff, Kevin Harvey, and Val Vaden. The firm is noted for creating the first equal ownership and compensation structure for its partners, where there are no "junior partners" or "senior partners," and there are also no CEO-like position held, differing from other VC firms which are named for their founders and are structured hierarchically. The firm has stated the reason for maintaining this approach is to "force discipline and accountability to focus on what matters" for its founders and limited partners, as their profits are driven by investment performance as opposed to management fees. The collective decision-making structure also means that Benchmark shares responsibility for the performance of the companies the firm invests in, not just the single partner who joins the company's board of directors.

Prior partners with the firm include Bill Gurley (who stepped back from his position after serving with the firm for twenty-one years), Mitch Lasky, and Matt Cohler (who each stepped back from their roles as partners after each spending more than a decade with the firm), and Victor Lazarte.

=== Investments ===
The firm's most successful investment was a 1997 investment of $6.7 million in eBay for 22.1% of the company. In 2011, it invested $12 million for an 11% stake in Uber, worth $7 billion in 2019 and $9.4 billion in 2023.

Benchmark’s first eight funds, raised and invested between 1995 and 2019, returned more than seven and a half times the money invested, net of fees and carry.

The firm has made exits from several companies, including Amplitude, Asana, Confluent, eBay, Elastic, Manus, New Relic, Nextdoor, Red Hat, Snap, Stitch Fix, and Uber.

In August 2017, Benchmark filed a lawsuit against Uber co-founder and former CEO Travis Kalanick, alleging that he had misled the board in order to gain control of additional board seats. The lawsuit sought Kalanick's removal from Uber's board of directors and was described as "unprecedented" in Silicon Valley venture capital circles. The litigation was eventually dismissed in January 2018 as a condition of SoftBank's investment in Uber. Following the Uber litigation, several entrepreneurs criticized Benchmark, while some industry observers, like Mark Suster of Upfront Ventures defended Benchmark's actions as necessary corporate governance.

Benchmark has pursued leadership changes at other portfolio companies, including solar technology company Nanosolar, where founder Martin Roscheisen was removed from his position, resulting in the firm drawing criticism from Roscheisen.

As of 2026, Benchmark's 2020 fund is worth more than 10 times what investors put in. The 2020 fund investments include Fireworks, Mercor, Sierra, and Legora. At this same time, it was reported Benchmark’s 2024 fund sits at 3 times investors initial investment, based on cash distributions and the paper value of remaining investments. The 2024 fund includes stakes in Manus, which Meta Platforms Inc. agreed to buy for $2 billion in 2025.

List of investments
Business	Source
1-800-Flowers	
Airtable	
AOL	
Art.com/Allposters.com	
Benchling	
CTERA Networks	
Cerebras Systems	
Chainalysis	
Cockroach Labs	
CouchSurfing	
Demandforce	
Digits	
Discord	
Duo Security	
Domo, Inc.	
Docker	
Dropbox	
EBags.com	
Fireworks AI	
Friendster	
HackerOne	
Instagram	
JAMDAT	
Juniper Networks	
Legora	
Marin Software	
Mercor	
Metacafe	
Minted	
Modern Treasury	
MySQL	
OpenTable	
Optimizely	
Palm, Inc.	
ResearchGate	
Seeking Alpha	
Sierra AI	
ServiceSource	
Sketch	
Solv	
Starcloud	
Twitter	
Tellme Networks	
Vessel	
WeWork	
Xapo	
Yelp, Inc.	
Zendesk	
Zillow	
Zipcar	
Zuora	

== In popular culture ==
Benchmark Capital was featured in the Apple TV+ original TV series WeCrashed starring Jared Leto and Anne Hathaway. In the show, Anthony Edwards portrays Benchmark co-founder Bruce Dunlevie, who became WeWork's first major investor on the 1st of April in 2012 when Benchmark led WeWork's $17 million Series-A seed funding.

Benchmark was also featured in the Showtime original Super Pumped starring Joseph Gordon-Levitt. In the series, Kyle Chandler plays former Benchmark general partner Bill Gurley, portraying his involvement in leading Ubers' $11 million round of fundraising in February 2011.

== See also ==
- List of venture capital firms
