= Marin Software =

American software company

Marin Software Incorporated
- Company type: Public
- Traded as: Nasdaq: MRIN; Russell Microcap Index component
- Industry: SaaS; Online advertising
- Founded: 2006; 20 years ago
- Fate: Bankruptcy (2025)
- Headquarters: San Francisco, California, United States
- Products: MarinOne; Marin Audience Marketing Suite
- Revenue: $58.6 million (2018)
- Number of employees: 500+
- Website: www.marinsoftware.com

Marin Software Incorporated is an online advertising company based in San Francisco. It was founded in 2006, had an IPO in 2013, and was dissolved in 2025 upon declaring bankruptcy.

== History ==
Christopher Lien, Wister Walcott, and Joseph Chang founded Marin Software in April 2006. In April 2007, Marin Search Marketer (since renamed MarinOne) debuted and became commercially available in North America.

Marin opened a UK office in early 2009. The company shared plans to expand into Asia-Pacific with offices in Singapore, Shanghai, and Sydney in 2011, and Tokyo in 2012.

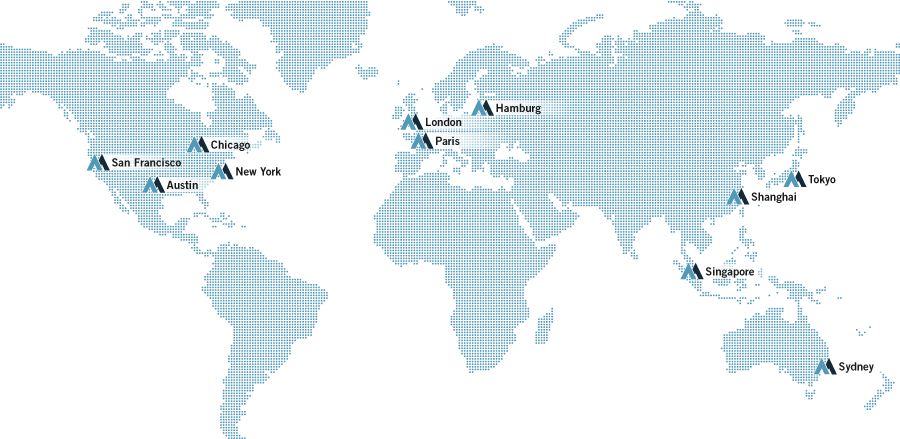
Marin Software has thirteen offices worldwide.

== Initial public offering ==
Between 2006 and 2012, Marin raised more than US$100 million in funding. The company reported a revenue of $36M in 2011 and $50M in 2012. In February 2013, Marin filed with the SEC for a $75M initial public offering. The company went public in March, selling 7.5M shares at a price of $14 per share, raising $105M at a valuation of $425M.

In 2014, Marin acquired Perfect Audience, and in 2015, they acquired Social Moov.

== Leadership changes and financial difficulties (2016–2024) ==
Between 2016 and 2024, Marin Software experienced significant changes in its leadership, product offerings, and market position, while facing ongoing financial challenges.

In September 2016, co-founder Wister Walcott rejoined Marin Software as Executive Vice President of Product and Technology, overseeing product development, technical operations, and engineering. That same year, Marin was elevated to Elite Status in the Bing Partner Program, reflecting its strong partnership with Microsoft and its role as a trusted advisor for Bing Ads clients.

Product innovation remained a focus. In 2024, Marin launched several AI-powered tools, including the Anomaly Detector, which uses OpenAI technology to automatically identify and summarize unexpected results in performance marketing campaigns. The company also introduced Advisor, an OpenAI-powered virtual assistant designed to streamline marketers’ workflows and provide actionable insights. Additional product enhancements included expanded integrations with Reddit and X (formerly Twitter), support for Amazon TV and Spotlight Ads, and advanced campaign management APIs.

Despite these innovations, Marin Software faced persistent financial difficulties. From 2016 onward, the company posted consistent annual losses and declining revenues. By late 2024, its market capitalization had fallen below $10 million, and shares were trading under $1, putting the company at risk of Nasdaq delisting. In October 2024, Marin implemented a restructuring plan that reduced its global workforce by approximately 26% to cut operating costs. The company also renewed its strategic partnership with Google for another three years in July 2024, aiming to strengthen its position in the competitive digital advertising landscape.

== Bankruptcy and dissolution (2025) ==
On July 1, 2025, Marin Software filed for Chapter 11 bankruptcy protection in the United States Bankruptcy Court for the District of Delaware, marking the end of a nearly two-decade run as a pioneer in digital advertising technology. The bankruptcy filing followed years of declining revenues, mounting losses, and intensifying competition from industry giants such as Google and Meta Platforms, whose free and low-cost advertising tools eroded Marin's market share.

In April 2025, Marin Software had announced plans to dissolve the company, subject to shareholder approval, after laying off approximately 30% of its staff. The company's board approved a formal plan of dissolution and liquidation, which included winding down operations, delisting from Nasdaq, resolving debts, and attempting to sell remaining assets. Marin Software received a delisting notice from Nasdaq on June 17, 2025, prior to the bankruptcy filing.

According to CEO and co-founder Chris Lien, the bankruptcy process was intended to facilitate the sale of Marin Software's assets to an affiliate of ESW Capital, an investment firm led by Joseph Liemandt. Lien stated that all creditors would be paid and that the buyer planned to continue operating Marin Software's platform, with remaining employees staying on at least until the transaction closed.

At the time of its bankruptcy, Marin Software reported approximately $5.7 million in assets and $2.8 million in debt. Over its lifetime, the company had never posted an annual profit, with cumulative losses exceeding $350 million. Marin's decline was attributed to the increasing dominance of Google and Meta in the digital advertising market, as well as the commoditization of ad management tools.

The bankruptcy and dissolution marked the conclusion of Marin Software's public company journey, which began with a 2013 IPO that valued the company at over $425 million.
