= Gusto, Inc. =

American payroll and benefits company

- Formerly: ZenPayroll, Inc.
- Type: Private
- Industry: business software industry
- Founded: November 2011; 15 years ago (as ZenPayroll)
- Headquarters: San Francisco
- Area served: United States
- Key people: Joshua Reeves (CEO); Edward Kim (CTO); Tomer London (CPO); Mike Taylor (CFO)
- Revenue: $500 million (2023)
- Number of employees: 2,400
- Website: gusto.com

Gusto, Inc. is a San Francisco-based company that develops payroll, benefits, and human resource management software for businesses based in the United States.

== History ==
ZenPayroll was part of Y Combinator's Winter 2012 batch. The company raised $6.1 million from investors including Box CEO and co-founder Aaron Levie, Yammer CEO and co-founder David O. Sacks, and others. The service launched officially on December 11, 2012 in California by Joshua Reeves, Tomer London and Edward Kim.

On June 12, 2013, the company announced support for paying contract workers and ensuring tax compliance through Form 1099 and other paperwork. The company also announced plans to launch services in Florida, Texas, and New York state.

In August 2013, Gusto announced that it had exceeded $100 million in payments processed annually, and was launching in Florida, Texas, and Washington state. In September 2014, the company announced its application programming interface (API) and partnerships with over a dozen small and medium business (SMB) back-office service companies. In December 2014, the company announced support for letting companies match employees' charitable donations. At the time, it was valued at over $100 million.

In 2014,VentureBeat listed the company among the best back-office software for small businesses. At the time, the New York Times compared the company to larger payroll processors such as ADP, citing both advantages and disadvantages.

In July 2015, the company announced that it had expanded its business and opened a new office in Denver, Colorado. In September 2015, it was announced that ZenPayroll had changed its name to Gusto, and was broadening its focus to integrate health benefits and workers' compensation into its payroll software. In December 2015, Gusto raised $50 million in funding and reached a $1 billion valuation.

Venture Beat reported that Gusto was raising prices on all customers in October 2016.

In July 2019, Gusto raised $200 million at a $3.8 billion valuation. That year, the company announced the opening of its third office, in New York City.

In 2023, the company was valued at $9.6 billion and had an annual revenue of $500 million. It had raised over $746 million in funding from investors as of 2024. It currently develops payroll processing software, in addition to software for employee onboarding (work authorization forms, direct deposit forms, employee information aggregation). Separately, Gusto also provides employee health insurance, dental insurance, and vision insurance enrollment and administration. The company provides other employee-benefit and related products through third parties, including 401K and workers' compensation insurance.

In August 2025, Gusto announced it would acquire Guideline, a startup providing 401(k) retirement plans to small businesses, for approximately $600 million — Gusto's largest acquisition to date.

In April 2026, Gusto acquired Mosey, a startup that helps businesses comply with multi-state payroll and employment regulations, for an undisclosed amount. By early 2026, Gusto had surpassed $1 billion in annual revenue, placing it alongside competitors Deel and Rippling in the $1 billion revenue tier, while maintaining a lower valuation of $9.3 billion based on a June 2025 employee tender offer.
