= Kevin Harvey (venture capitalist) =

American investor and venture capitalist

- Born: Sunnyvale, California, U.S.
- Education: Rice University
- Occupation: Venture capitalist
- Employer: General Partner at Benchmark

Kevin R. Harvey is an American businessperson and venture capitalist. He is a founder and general partner at Benchmark Capital.

As a software entrepreneur, he founded companies such as StyleWare and Approach Software in the 1990s and was recognized for it.

Harvey is also known for founding Rhys Vineyards and its offshoot Aeris.

Harvey was ranked No. 27 on the 2011 Forbes' Midas List and was No. 59 in 2012.

== Early life and education ==
Harvey was born in Sunnyvale, California and spent his early life in Texas.

For his college education, Harvey attended Rice University and graduated with a BS degree in electrical engineering in 1987.

== Career ==
The first company Harvey founded was StyleWare, a software company which was based in Houston and was a publisher of more than ten software products, including Multiscribe. In 1988, Claris Corporation, a subsidiary of Apple, acquired the company. After the purchase, the Styleware continued to develop it as ClarisWorks.

Harvey founded Approach Software and was its president. He led the development of the first end-user client/server database for Microsoft Windows. Lotus Development acquired Approach Software in 1993.

=== Benchmark Capital ===
Harvey co-founded Benchmark Capital in 1995. The firm has invested in multiple companies, including eBay, OpenTable, Snapchat, Twitter and Uber. Some companies have gone to complete successful IPOs, including Red Hat and Proofpoint.

As a general partner at Benchmark Capital, Harvey also led the firm's investments in such companies as BOKU, Bytemobile (now part of Citrix Systems), CollabNet, CloudPassage, Eucalyptus Systems (acquired by HP), Highlight (acquired by Pinterest), Ingenio (acquired by AT&T), Metaweb (acquired by Google), MySQL, oDesk, oFoto (acquired by Kodak), RemarQ Communities (acquired by Critical Path, Inc.), RightScale, Tellme Networks (acquired by Microsoft), When.com (acquired by America Online), Zimbra (acquired by Yahoo!), and Minerva University.

Harvey is on the boards of Upwork and Minerva.

=== Wine ===
In 1995, Harvey began his wine project planting vines in his backyard and making wine in his garage. This lead him to become the founder of Rhys Vineyards in the Santa Cruz Mountains, where he had his first harvest in 2004.

Rhys Vineyards has produced award-winning wines. Antonio Galloni, a wine critic, has called it, "one of the finest wineries in the United States."

Rhys Vineyards has developed eight estate vineyards. Six of these, including Alpine, Family Farm, Home, Horseshoe, Mount Pajaro and Skyline, are located in the Santa Cruz Mountains AVA. The two additional vineyards, Bearwallow, located in Anderson Valley, and Clarke Ranch, located in Mendocino County.

In August 2019, Kevin Harvey agreed to pay $3.76 million in penalties after his company bulldozed a protected wetland and filled in a stream bed to build a vineyard in Mendocino County. This settlement represents one of the largest ever involving water quality on the North Coast. The damage to the stream is so extreme that regulators determined the stream system to be beyond saving, and large portion of the fine will go towards improving two other nearby stream systems.

Rhys Vineyards has also developed a ninth estate vineyard, Centennial Mountain, devoted to Italian grape varieties. These wines were sold under the Aeris label. As part of this project, the Aeris team brought in two Sicilian grape varieties, Carricante and Nerello Mascalese, that are not known to have been grown in California prior. The San Francisco Chronicle has described Carricante as "The best white wine you have never tasted". Aeris also owned two vineyards in Sicily and these wines were also sold under the Aeris label. In 2025, the label rebranded to the namesake of the vineyard, Centennial Mountain.
