= Damon Runyon Cancer Research Foundation =

Non-profit organization in the U.S.

- Founded: 1946; 80 years ago as "The Damon Runyon Memorial Fund for Cancer Research, Inc."
- Founder: Walter Winchell
- Location: 55 Broadway, Suite 302 New York, NY 10006
- Region served: United States
- Method: Support young scientists to perform high-risk, high-reward cancer research
- Fields: Cancer research
- Key people: Yung S. Lie, PhD, president and chief executive officer
- Revenue: $19,559,693 (2023)
- Employees: 19 (2023)
- Website: damonrunyon.org

The Damon Runyon Cancer Research Foundation (Damon Runyon) is an American not-for-profit cancer research organization focused on "discovering the talent to discover the cure". The organization states that its goals are to: "identify the best and brightest early career scientists in cancer research, accelerate the translation of scientific discoveries into new diagnostic tools and treatments, and to enable risk-taking on bold new ideas".

The organization was founded in 1946 by media personality Walter Winchell in New York City, New York, in memory of his colleague and friend Damon Runyon, a newspaperman and author. It was subsequently incorporated in New York as the Damon Runyon Memorial Fund for Cancer Research, Inc.

== History ==
Shortly after Runyon's death from cancer on December 10, 1946, Winchell appealed on his radio program for donations to fight cancer, an appeal that helped launch the Damon Runyon Memorial Fund for Cancer Research. The fund was subsequently incorporated in New York and raised $10 million for cancer research over the following nine years.

The organization gained more visibility in 1949 when Milton Berle, a long-time friend of both Runyon and Winchell, hosted the first-ever telethon, raising $1.1 million for the foundation over 16 hours. In its first three decades, the foundation was a popular cause among celebrities from Hollywood to Broadway and the sports world. Marlene Dietrich, Bob Hope, Marilyn Monroe, Joe DiMaggio, and many of their contemporaries served as supporters and board members.

== Award programs and research ==
The organization manages six award programs "aimed at encouraging and advancing the work of early career cancer researchers with high promise". The Fellowship Award is the oldest and most widely known in the scientific community, giving postdoctoral researchers between $200,000 and $250,000 over four years. Other programs include the Damon Runyon-Sohn Pediatric Cancer Fellowship Award, the Damon Runyon Clinical Investigator Award and the Damon Runyon-Rachleff Innovation Award. The foundation launched in 2020 the Damon Runyon Quantitative Biology Fellowship to bridge quantitative approaches to cancer research.

The foundation has funded thirteen Nobel Prize laureates, including Albert Szent-Györgyi, Salvador E. Luria, Susumu Tonegawa and Sidney Altman. Sixty-five foundation scientists and alumni have been elected to the U.S. National Academy of Sciences.

== Evaluations ==
The Damon Runyon Cancer Research Foundation holds a perfect 4 star rating from Charity Navigator. According to the Better Business Bureau Wise Giving Alliance, the foundation met nineteen of the twenty standards for charity accountability as of 2026. A timeline listing of specific accomplishments and milestones by foundation scientists is available on the foundation's website.
