= Fox Theatre (Fullerton, California) =

Fox Fullerton Theatre
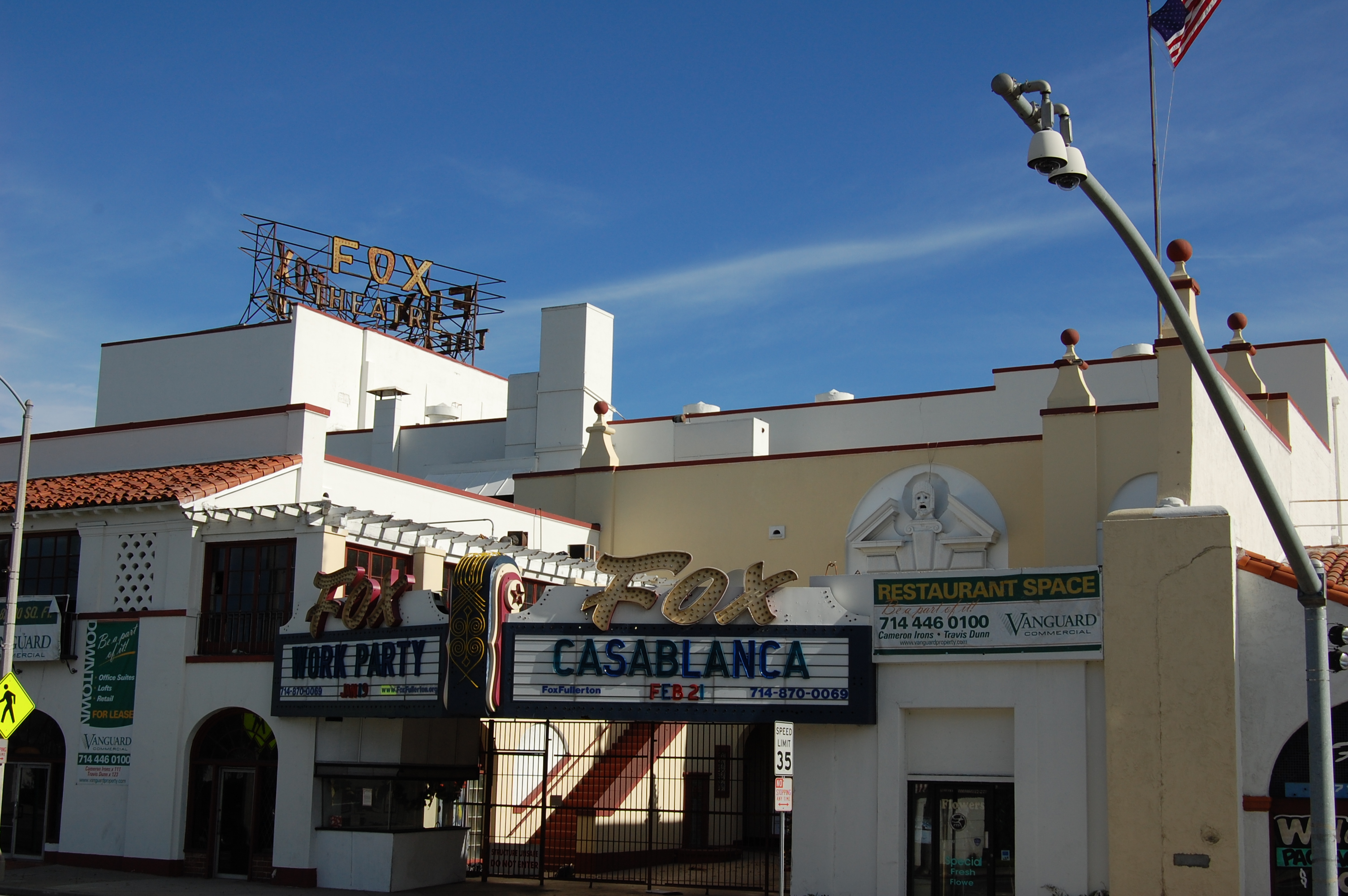
- Street view of Fullerton Fox Theatre
- Interactive map of Fox Fullerton Theatre
- Address: 510 N. Harbor Boulevard; Fullerton, California; United States
- Capacity: 900
- Type: Movie palace
- Public transit: Orange County Line

Construction
- Opened: 1925
- Closed: 1987
- Fox Fullerton Theatre Complex
- U.S. National Register of Historic Places
- Location within California Location within the United States
- Location: Fullerton
- Coordinates: 33°52′28″N 117°55′26″W
- Built: 1925
- Architect: Raymond M. Kennedy
- Architectural style: Italian Renaissance
- NRHP reference No.: 06000948
- Added to NRHP: October 25, 2006

Fox Theatre is a historic movie theater located on Harbor Boulevard in Fullerton, California. Built in 1925 as part of the chain of Fox Theatres, the theater was closed and abandoned in 1987. The Fullerton Historic Theatre Foundation is currently in the process of fundraising and restoring the theater.

Constructed by prominent local businessman C. Stanley Chapman, the building was designed as a combination of vaudeville and silent movie house flanked by a one-story retail wing, two-story café, and an having an Italian Renaissance theme. The original lines of this building are now obscured by the many later renovations and additions, including the subsequent construction of the building at the northeast corner of Harbor Boulevard and Chapman Avenue.

== History ==
Constructed in 1924-25 by active local businessman C. Stanley Chapman, son of Fullerton's first mayor Charles Chapman, the mixed-use building was designed to function as a combination vaudeville/silent movies house flanked by a one-story retail wing and a two-story café. It was named Chapman's Alician Court Theatre after the builder's wife Alice Ellen, but as ownership changed so did the name of the theater, and it was variously known as the Mission Court Theatre, Universal Mission Court Theatre, Fox Mission Theatre and finally the Fox Theatre. The theater's first manager was C. Stanley Chapman's father-in-law Harry Lee Wilber, who left another of Fullerton's picture theaters, the nearby Rialto at 219 North Harbor Boulevard, to operate the Fox. The theater was originally located at 500 North Spadra (now Harbor) Boulevard. In 1929, an L-shaped commercial structure on an adjacent lot was added to the south side of the building. At various times over the years addresses changed, and the Fox is now situated at 510-512 North Harbor Boulevard. The theater's architect was Raymond M. Kennedy of the firm Meyer & Holler. Meyer and Holler completed the theatre in 1925. Although they built hundreds of structures, it was primarily their 1920s Hollywood buildings that established Meyer and Holler's fame; buildings such as Grauman's Egyptian Theatre and the TCL Chinese Theatre, the Hollywood Athletic Club, and the Café Montmartre. Having also built many of Hollywood's major film studios, it can be said that Meyer and Holler may have been the firm most responsible for giving architectural form to the early entertainment industry in Southern California. The Fox Fullerton remains the firm's major architectural contribution to Orange County.

When it opened, the Italian Renaissance-inspired Theatre was the show place of Orange County, a movie palace representing the height of Hollywood glamour and sophistication. It was the largest structure of its kind in northern Orange County, and was an integral element in the social fabric of downtown life, where people gathered for news, entertainment, and socializing. In addition to its shows, the Alician Court offered a unique atmosphere – from its courtyard “lobby” to its lavish interior. The open courtyard was an innovation in theatre design that took advantage of outdoor spaces and their visibility to the street, creating a sense of excitement as passers-by witnessed large crowds gathering for a show or premiere. The original theater complex included a tea room run by Alice Chapman, but the space was later leased as a separate restaurant. The restaurant has since moved, and the tea room will be reincorporated into the theater when it reopens.

Another special feature of the theatre is six large murals created by Anthony Heinsbergen and Company, one of the foremost building decor firms of the era. The firm's work includes art at Los Angeles City Hall, the Biltmore Hotel, and the Wiltern Theatre. (Fullerton is becoming known as a destination for mural art due to its unique historic and contemporary mural works. When restored, the Fox murals will pre-date all others in the city.) The decorative painter for the theatre was John Gabriel Beckman, who was then working for Meyer and Holler. He was responsible for the elaborate artwork in both the main and mezzanine lobbies, and the design for the original curtains. He went on to design the extensive mural work at the Avalon Casino, and later became a set designer for Paramount Pictures. The original murals were painted over in the 1950s during the building's first refurbishment. The proscenium, on the other hand, remains intact.

After a showing of Angel Heart starring Mickey Rourke, the theatre closed in 1987. It was scheduled to be demolished in 2004 to make way for a five-story apartment building, but was saved by the Fullerton Historic Theatre Foundation (FHTF), which was formed in 2001 to acquire and restore the theater. Since then, it has become an official landmark of the City of Fullerton. In 2005 the city of Fullerton began to show movies in the rear parking lot to raise funds for the restoration, projecting the film onto the outer wall of the theater, and in 2006 Los Angeles magazine named it as one of LA's strangest places to see films. The Fox Theatre was added to the National Register of Historic Places in October 2006.

== Restoration ==
The Fullerton Historic Theatre Foundation is currently restoring the building. In 2007, the theater received nearly $2 million in grant money from the state of California. The tentative date for completion of the restoration work was originally scheduled for 2010. According to many members of the foundation in 2013, the theatre was expected to reopen in somewhere between 3 and 5 years' time. During the theatre's construction, the courtyard has opened two restaurants: a coffeehouse and a German restaurant.

== Gallery ==
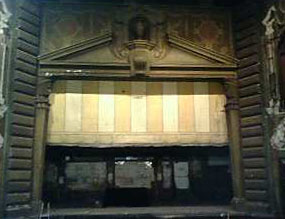
The stage in 2007, during reconstruction

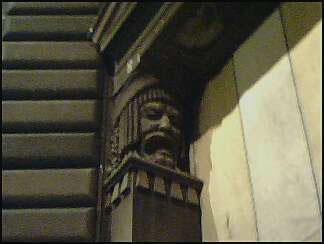
Detail of the proscenium capitals
