= Aztec Theater =

Aztec Theater may refer to:

- Aztec Theatre (San Antonio), a historic theater in San Antonio, Texas, USA
- Aztec Theater (The Simpsons), a movie theater in Springfield, the fictional suburb in The Simpsons
