= Petersen Building =

Building in Los Angeles, California, U.S.

- U.S. Historic district – Contributing property
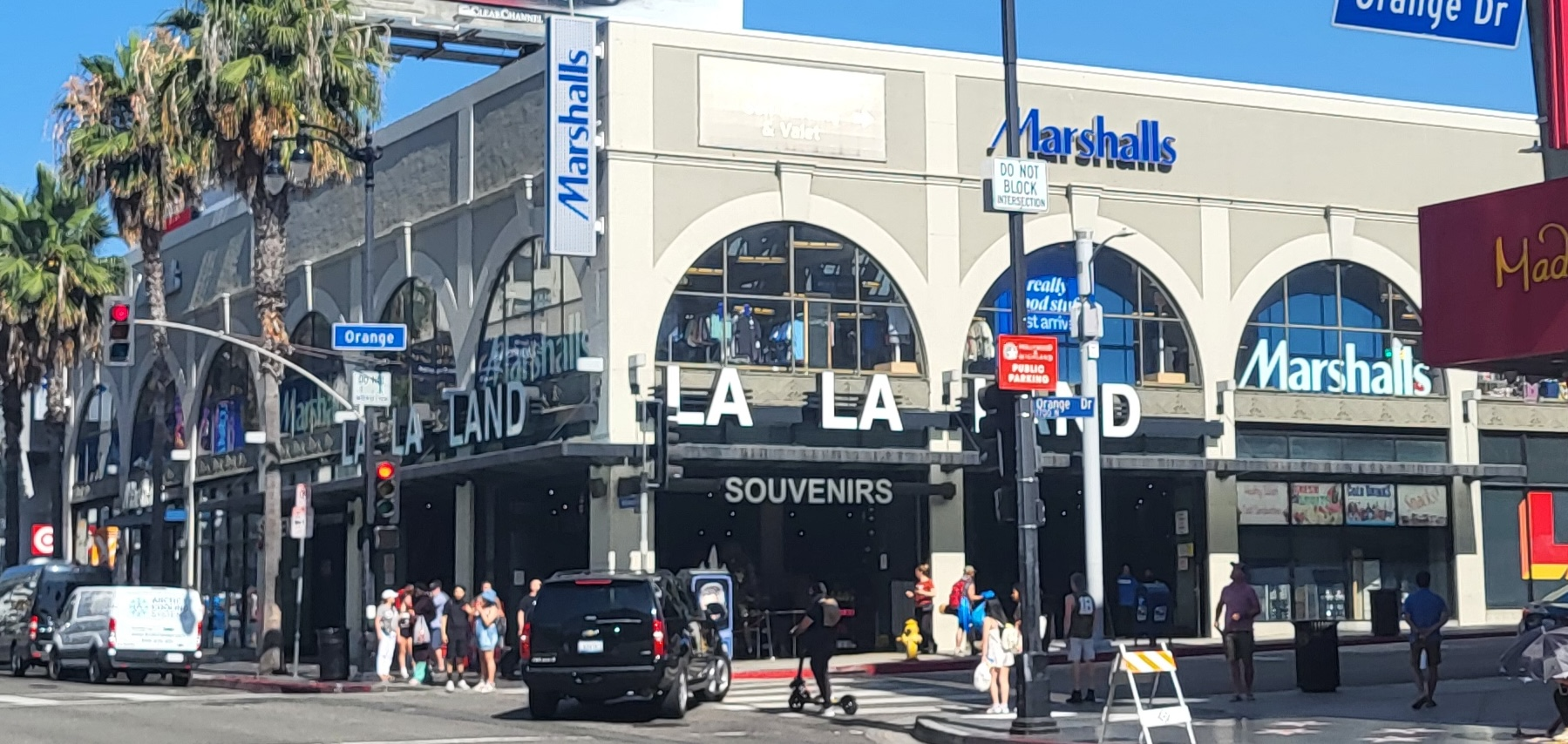
- The building in 2024

- Location within the Los Angeles metropolitan area
- Location: 7001 W. Hollywood Blvd., Hollywood, California
- Coordinates: 34.102°N 118.343°W
- Area: 35,003 square feet (3,251.9 m^{2})
- Built: 1929
- Architect: Meyer & Holler
- Architectural style: Art Deco
- Part of: Hollywood Boulevard Commercial and Entertainment District (ID85000704)
- Designated CP: April 4, 1985

Petersen Building is a historic two-story building at 7001 W. Hollywood Boulevard in Hollywood, California. Originally a Cadillac/LaSalle dealership, the building housed the Hollywood Motorama Museum in the 1970s and was bought by Tinder co-founder Justin Mateen in 2025. It is a contributing property in the Hollywood Boulevard Commercial and Entertainment District.

== History ==
Petersen Building, built in 1929, was designed by the architectural firm Meyer & Holler, the same firm responsible for many of Hollywood's most notable landmarks, including Hollywood First National and the Chinese and Egyptian theatres. This building, 35,003 square feet (3,251.9 m^{2}) in area, was originally a Cadillac/LaSalle dealership. The dealership opened on December 14, 1929, the opening featuring numerous radio and movie stars giving a 2.5 hour live-radio performance to an expected crowd of 25,000.

A car museum named Hollywood Motorama opened in the building in 1975; the museum was owned by Robert Petersen and contained amongst other vehicles the 1966 Batmobile, Munster Koach, and the Bonnie and Clyde 1934 Ford movie car.

In 1985, the Hollywood Boulevard Commercial and Entertainment District was added to the National Register of Historic Places, with 7001 Hollywood Blvd. listed as a contributing property in the district. The building was bought for $8.3 million in 1999 ($16 million in 2025).

In 2025, Justin Mateen, co-founder of Tinder, bought this building and neighboring Hollywood Galaxy Shopping Center for $69 million.

== Architecture and design ==
Peterson Building is Art Deco in style and features arched windows, a flat roof, and deco detailing incised in the roof line concrete facade. The United States Department of the Interior describes the building as "a good example of an automobile showroom in an upscale retail setting."

== See also ==
- List of contributing properties in the Hollywood Boulevard Commercial and Entertainment District
