= Cabrillo =

Cabrillo may refer to:

== People ==
- Juan Rodríguez Cabrillo, the first European to explore California.

== Places, buildings and structures ==
- Cabrillo Beach, a section of San Pedro, California near Point Fermin
- Cabrillo Bridge, San Diego, California
- Cabrillo Freeway, the official name of California State Route 163
- Cabrillo Highway, various segments of California State Route 1
- Cabrillo Marine Museum, San Pedro, California
- Cabrillo National Monument, San Diego, California
- Fox Cabrillo Theatre, San Pedro, California
- Point Cabrillo Light, a peninsula and lighthouse in Mendocino County, northern California

== Schools ==
- Cabrillo College in Aptos, California
- Cabrillo High School (Lompoc, California)
- Cabrillo High School (Long Beach, California)
- Cabrillo Middle School in Santa Clara, California
- Cabrillo Middle School in Ventura, California

== Other ==
- SS Cabrillo, a wooden steamship
