= Singer Building (Los Angeles) =

Building in Los Angeles, California

- U.S. Historic district – Contributing property
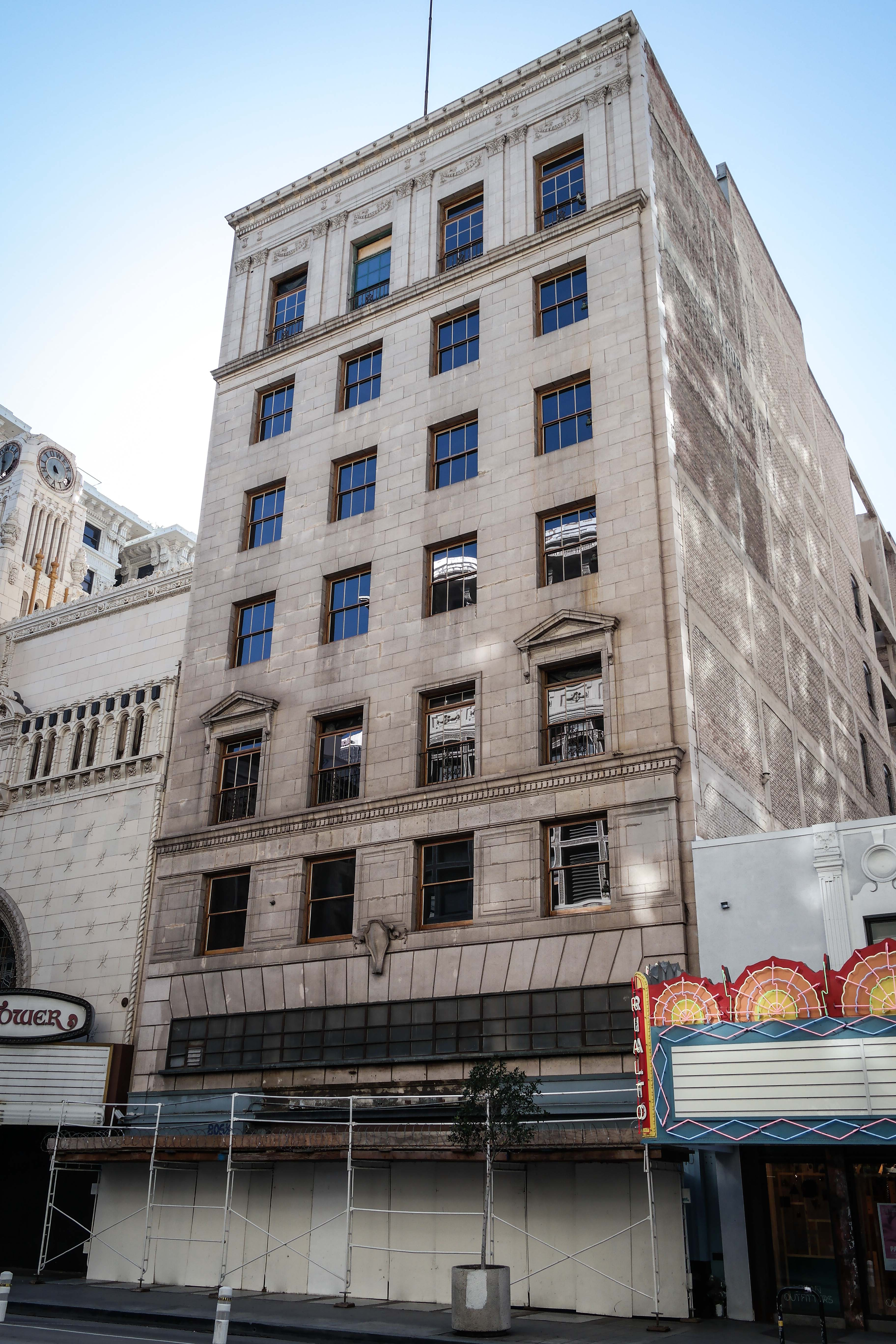
- The building in 2014

- Location within the Los Angeles metropolitan area
- Location: 806 S. Broadway, Los Angeles, California
- Coordinates: 34°02′37″N 118°15′17″W
- Built: 1922
- Architect: Meyer & Holler
- Architectural style: Italian Renaissance
- Part of: Broadway Theater and Commercial District (ID79000484)
- Designated CP: May 9, 1979

Singer Building, also known as Singer Sewing Building and Allied Arts Building, is a historic seven story high-rise located at 806 S. Broadway, between the Tower and Rialto theaters in the Broadway Theater District in the historic core of downtown Los Angeles.

== History ==
Singer Building was built in 1922 by Meyer and Holler, the architecture firm also responsible for Hollywood's Chinese and Egyptian theaters and Hollywood First National. The building's original tenants were the Southern California Music Company, who used it for sales and also hosted concerts in a top floor auditorium, and the Singer sewing machine company.

In 1979, the Broadway Theater and Commercial District was added to the National Register of Historic Places, with Singer Building listed as a contributing property in the district.

In 2018, the building was converted to residential with ground floor retail.

== Architecture and design ==
Singer Building features Italian Renaissance architecture and is made of concrete and pressed brick.

== See also ==
- List of contributing properties in the Broadway Theater and Commercial District
