= Meyer & Holler =

American architectural firm

Meyer & Holler was an architecture firm based in Los Angeles, California, noted for its opulent commercial buildings and movie theatres, including Grauman's Chinese and Egyptian theatres, built during the 1920s. Meyer & Holler was also known as The Milwaukee Building Company.

== History ==
Gabriel S. Meyer
- Born: 1874; Los Angeles, California
- Died: 1955 (aged 80–81); Santa Barbara, California
- Occupation: Architect
- Practice: Meyer & Holler
- Buildings: Henry Weaver House; Grauman's Egyptian Theatre; Fox Fullerton; Alex Theatre; Grauman's Chinese Theatre; Aztec Theatre

Philip W. Holler
- Born: 1869; Indiana
- Died: 1942 (aged 72–73); Los Angeles, California
- Occupation: Architect
- Practice: Meyer & Holler
- Buildings: Henry Weaver House; Grauman's Egyptian Theatre; Fox Fullerton; Alex Theatre; Grauman's Chinese Theatre; Aztec Theatre

The Milwaukee Building Company was established in 1906 as a design and construction firm, with Mendel Meyer as president, Gabriel Holler as vice president, and Julius C. Schneider as secretary. In 1911, they were joined by Phillip W. Holler.

The Milwaukee Building Company became the Los Angeles-based architectural office of Meyer & Holler, an eminent firm responsible for the design of numerous Southern California landmark buildings. The company opted for the Design-build approach very early in its history. The architectural firm to design the structure and the Milwaukee Building Company to build it. Only on very rare occasions did it contract to erect projects designed by independent architects. In the 1920s in Los Angeles, Meyer & Holler were one of the most esteemed architectural firms, and the Milwaukee Building Company was the largest contracting firm.

At first emphasizing residential work of an increasingly important scale, Meyer & Holler switched to an emphasis on commercial work after World War I. Integral to the company's strategy for success was the offering of architectural design services of an unusually high level of quality, which it was able to due as a result of hiring some of the finest architectural design talent available in Southern California in the 1910s and 1920s.

Meyer and Holler was founded by Gabriel S. Meyer and Philip W. Holler Meyer & Holler also designed and built apartment buildings, hotels, banks, and churches. A number of Meyer & Holler buildings are now on the National Register of Historic Places. Incorporated in 1906, Meyer & Holler developed into one of the largest building firms in Los Angeles before declaring bankruptcy in 1932 as an indirect result of litigation related to California's architectural registration laws.

== Associated architects and draftsmen ==
- Raymond M. Kennedy
- Donald Wilkinson (1890–1975) chief architect (1920–1932)
- Lewis Elbert Blaize, bungalow designer
- Kenneth Wing

== Selected works ==
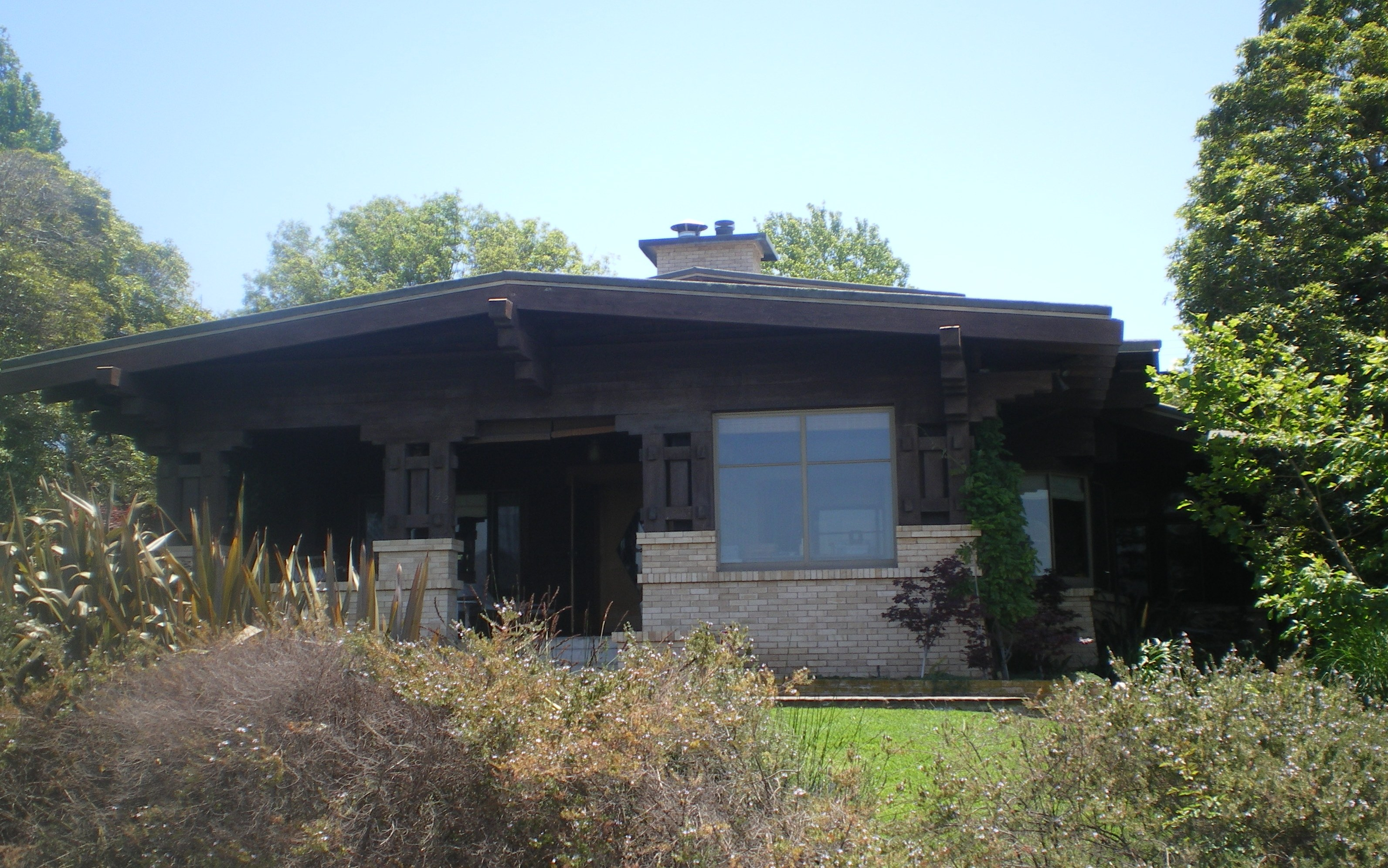
Henry Weaver House

=== National Register of Historic Places ===
- Henry Weaver House, Santa Monica (1910) No. 89002114
- Fox Fullerton, Fullerton (1925) No. 06000948
- Alex Theatre, Glendale (1925) No. 96000102
- Aztec Theatre, San Antonio, Texas (1926) No. 92001403

==== Hollywood Boulevard Commercial and Entertainment District ====
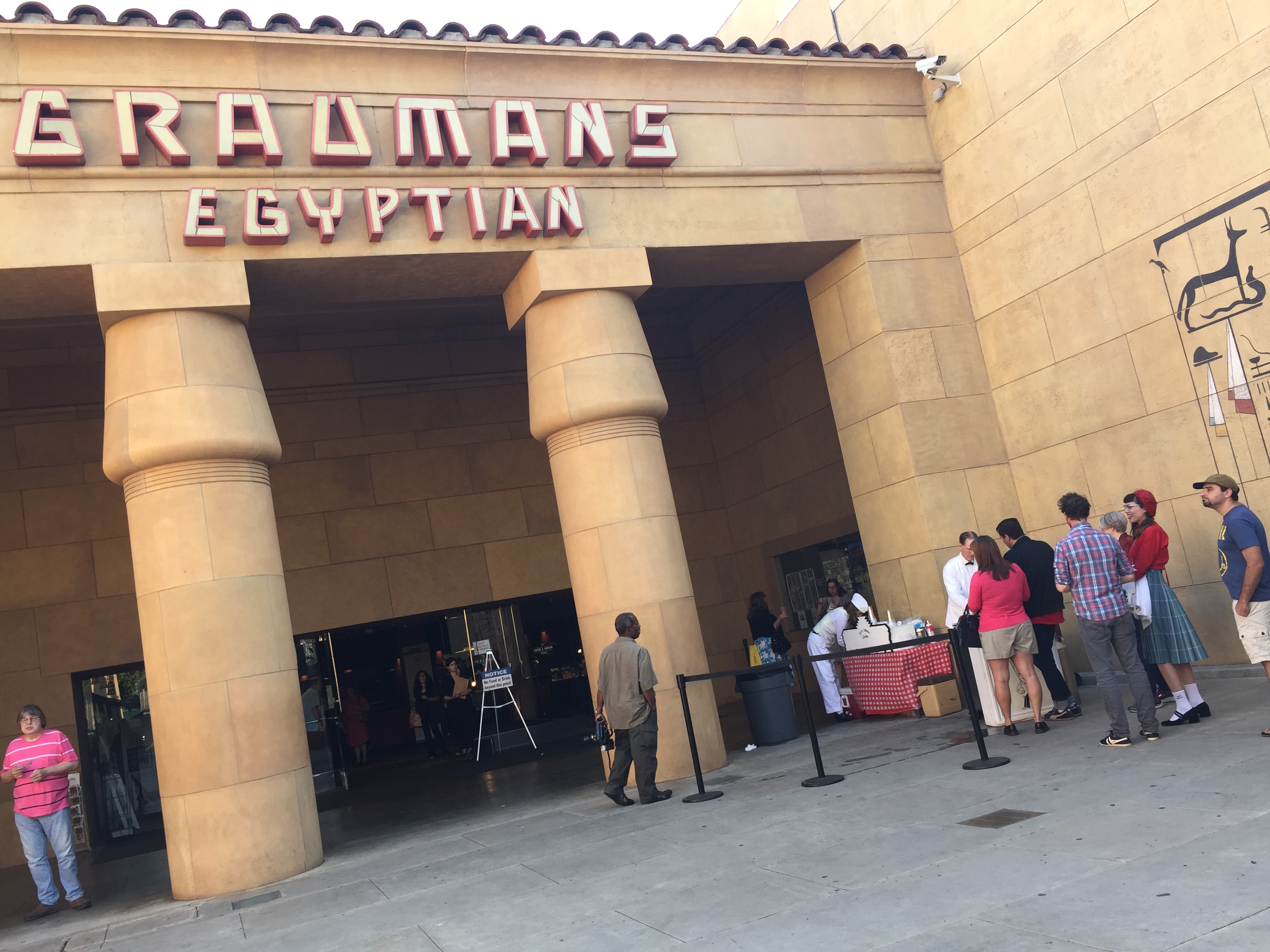
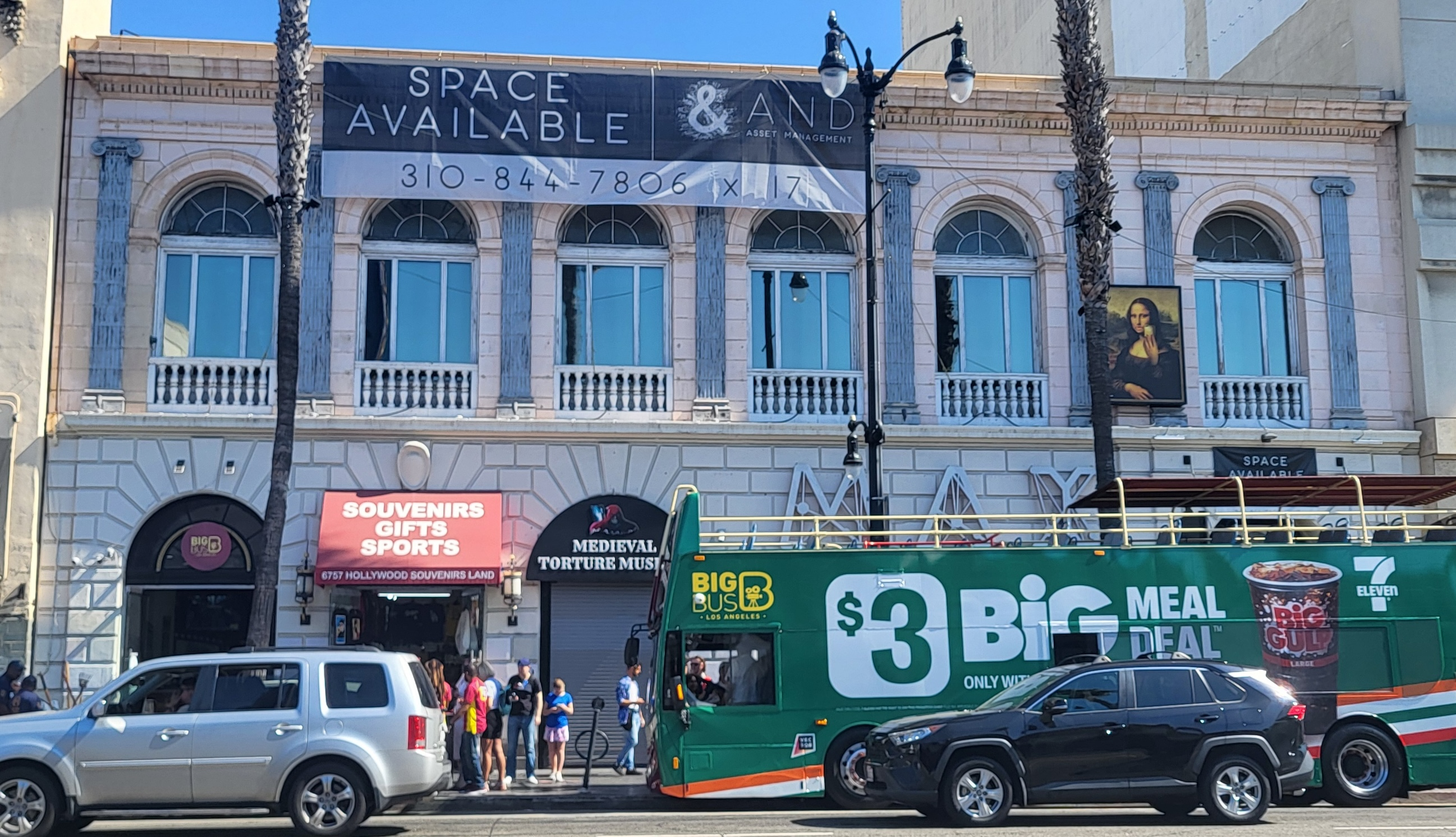
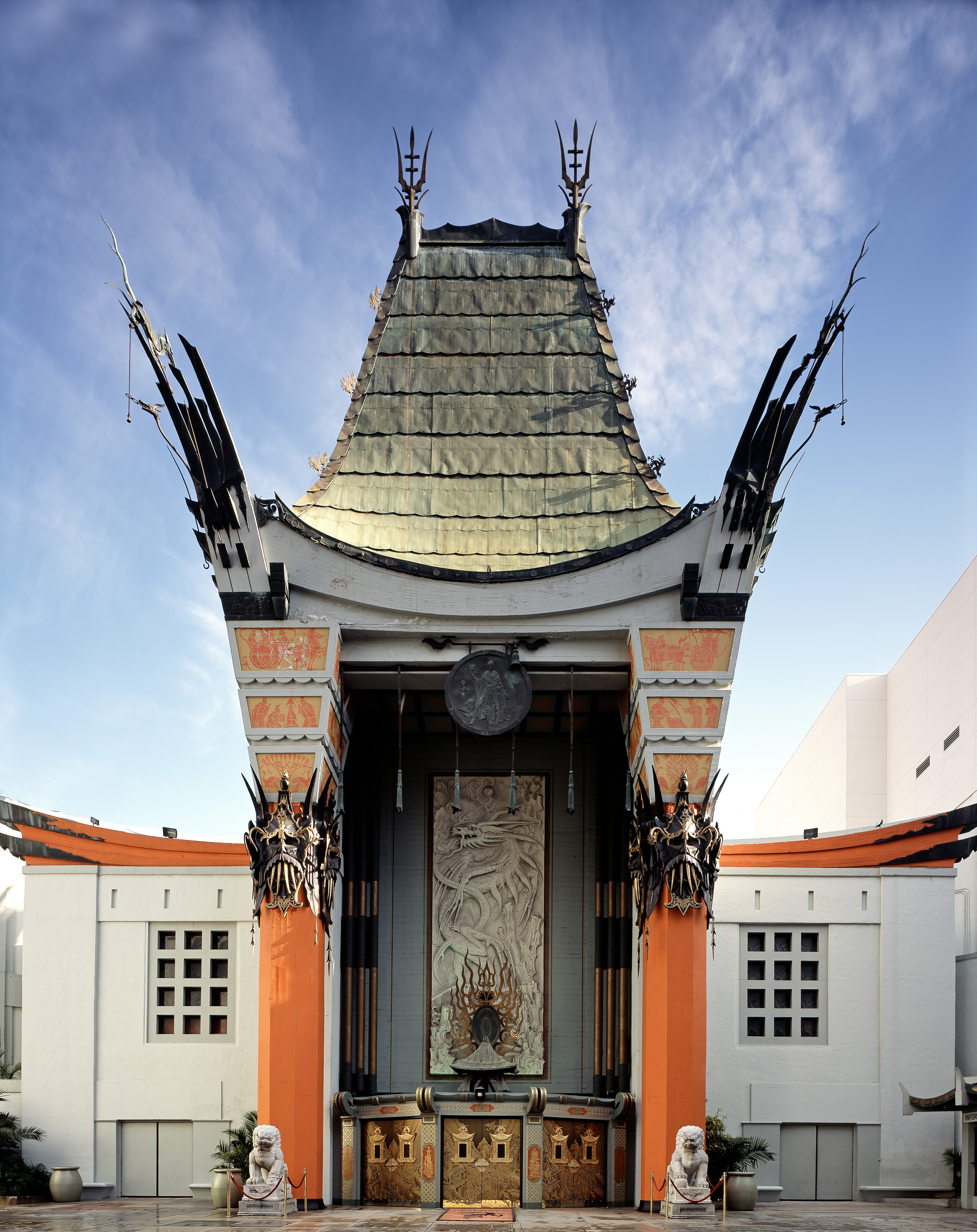
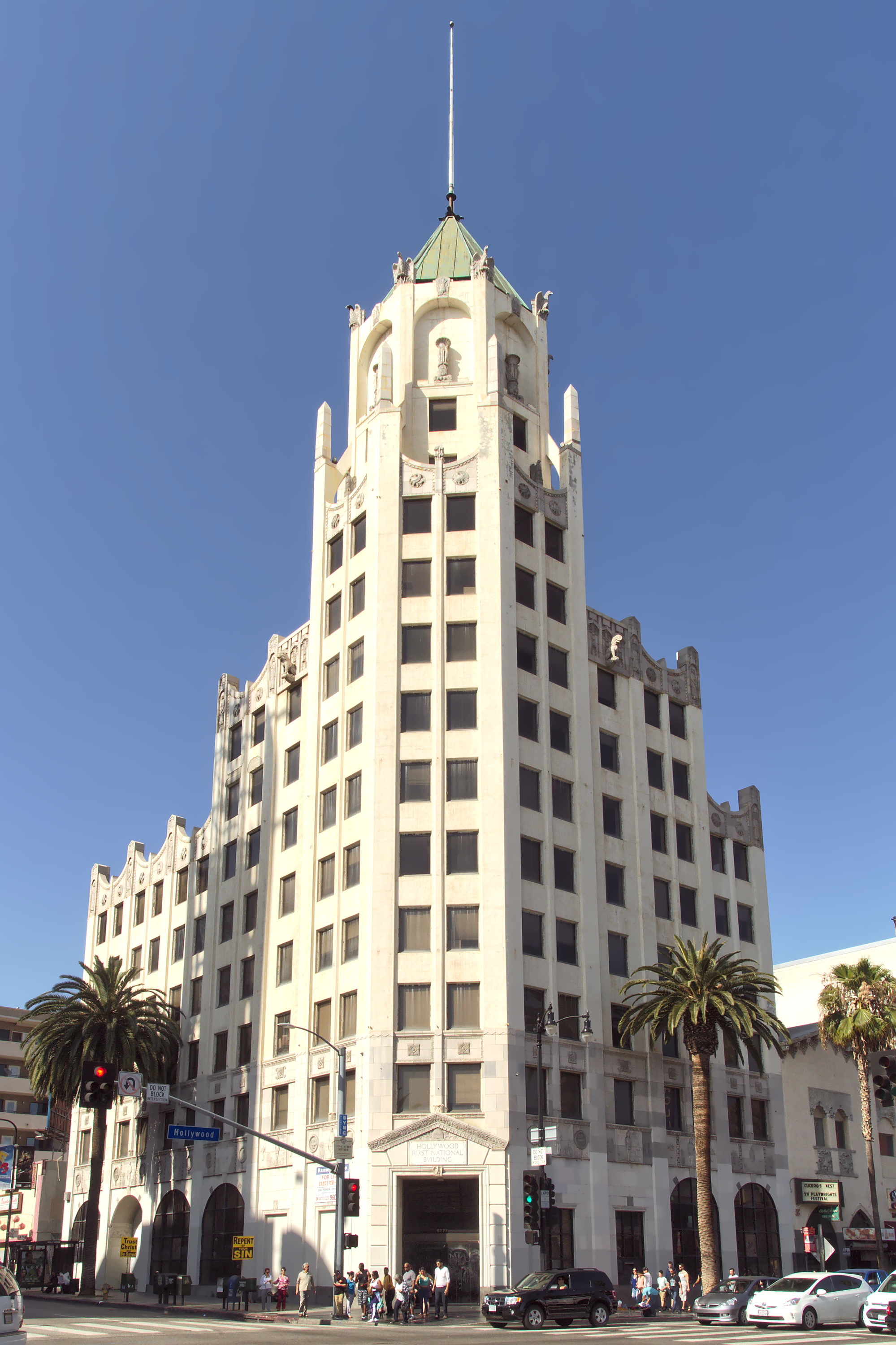
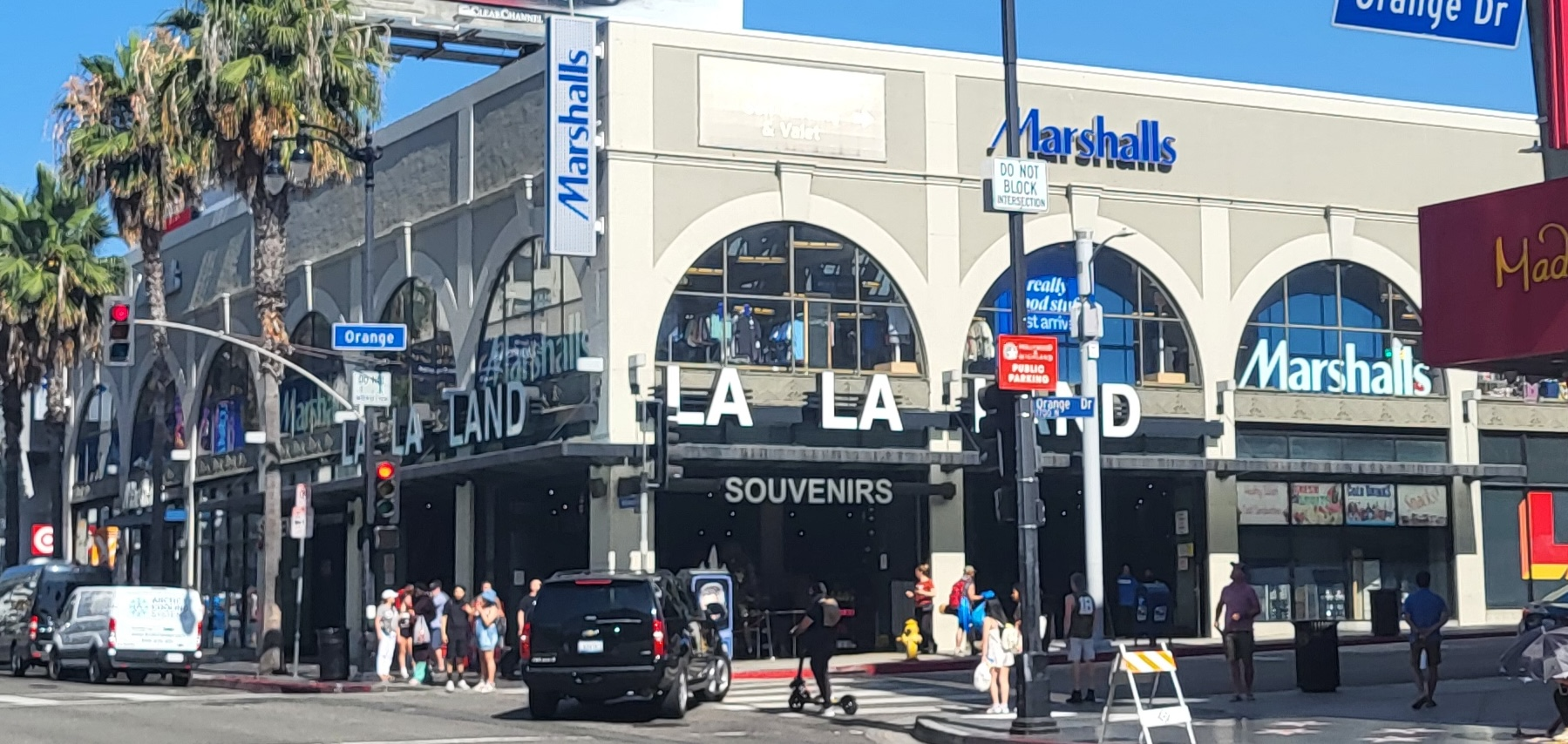
Contributing properties in the Hollywood Boulevard Commercial and Entertainment District (clockwise from upper-left): Grauman's Egyptian Theatre, Café Montmartre, First National Bank of Hollywood, Petersen Building, Grauman's Chinese Theatre
- Grauman's Egyptian Theatre (1922)
- Café Montmartre (1922)
- Grauman's Chinese Theatre (1927)
- First National Bank of Hollywood (1927)
- Petersen Building (1929)

==== Broadway Theater and Commercial District ====
- Broadway Leasehold Building (1914)
- Singer Building (1922)

==== Whitley Heights Historic District ====
- Residence at 2075 Watsonia Terrace (1928)

=== Los Angeles Historic-Cultural Monuments ===
- Mount Washington Hotel and Inn (1909) No. 845
- Herivel House (1912) No. 370
- Grauman's Egyptian Theatre (1922) No. 584
- Petroleum Building (1925) No. 596
- Grauman's Chinese Theatre (1927) No. 55

=== Santa Monica Historic Landmarks ===
- Henry Weaver House (1910) No. 20
- Isaac Milbank House (1911) No. 42

=== Long Beach Historic Landmarks ===
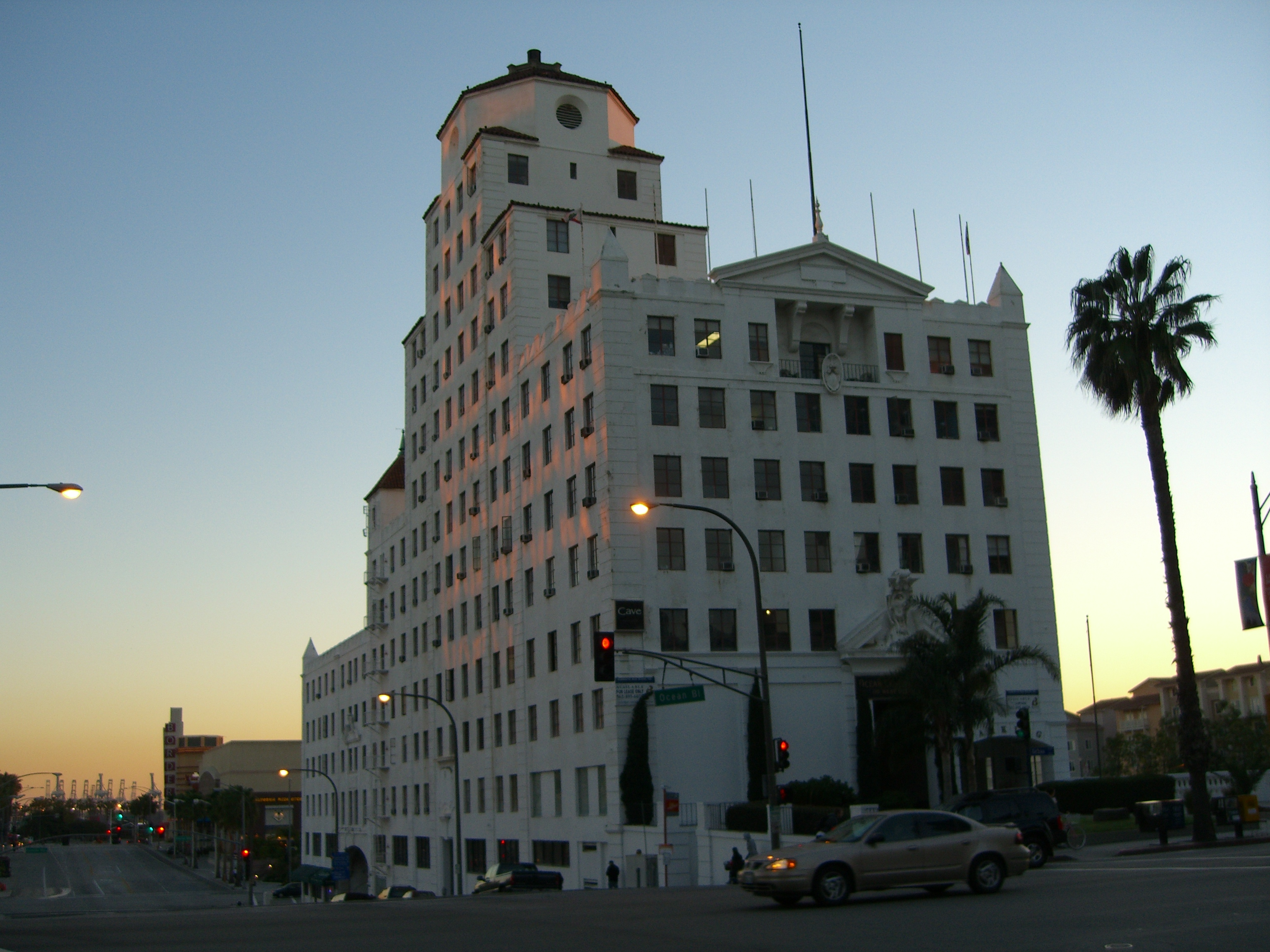
Ocean Center Building

- Walker Building (1929) 16.52.510
- Ocean Center Building (1929) 16.52.370

=== Other ===
==== In Los Angeles ====
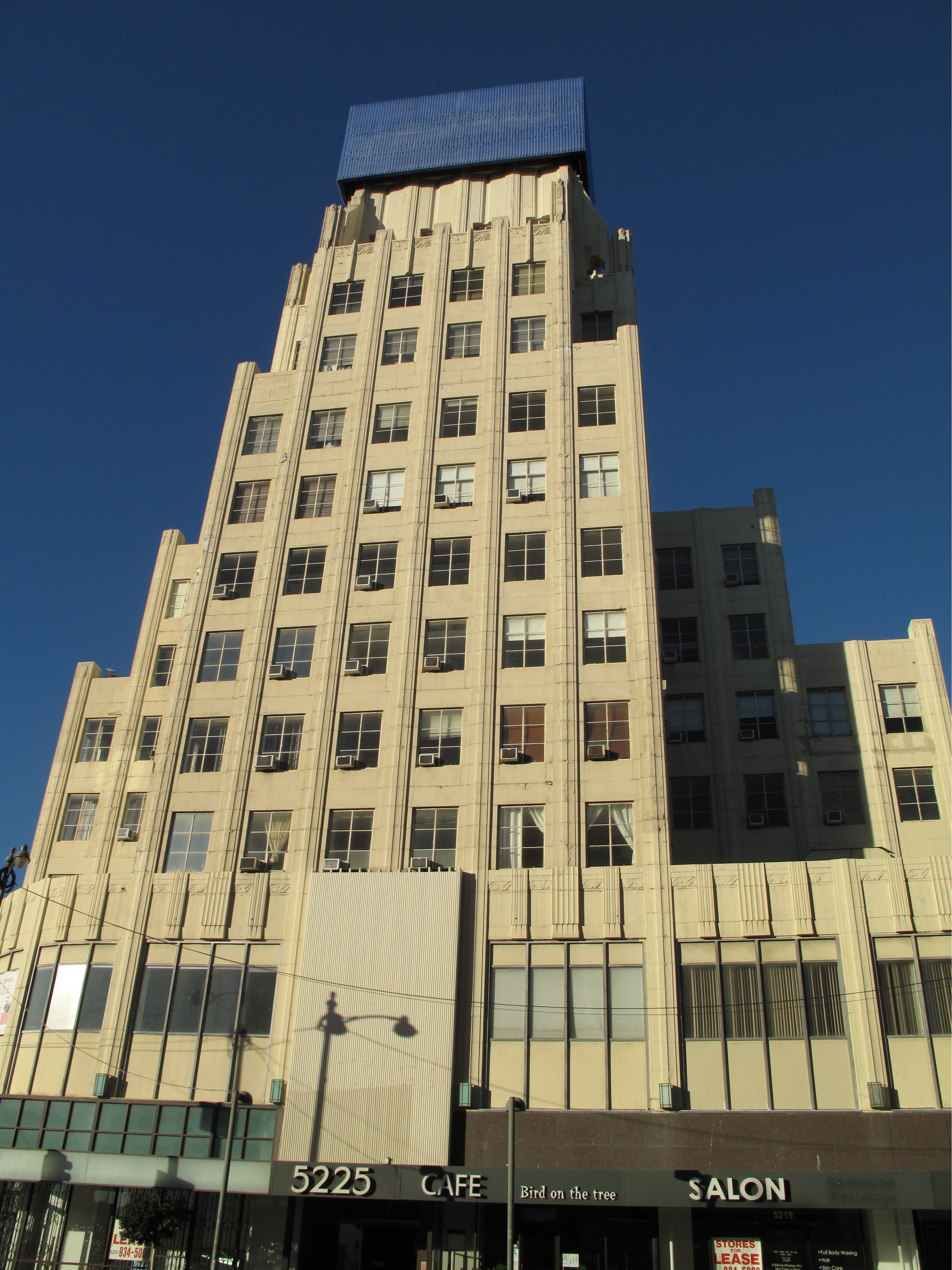
E. Clem Wilson Building

- L.L. Burns Building (1914)
- Granada Theatre (1921)
- Thomas McNamara House (1922)
- Medical Arts Building (1922)
- Hollywood Athletic Club (1923)
- Fox Cabrillo Theatre (1923)
- Fourth Church of Christ Scientist (1924)
- Ninth Church of Christ Scientist (1925)
- Quinby Office Building (1926)
- Masonic Lodge (1928)
- Hillcrest Motors (1929)
- Twenty-Sixth Church of Christ Scientist (1929)
- Mason Opera House (1920s remodel)
- E. Clem Wilson Building (1930)
- Twelfth Church of Christ Scientist (1931)

==== Elsewhere ====
- Elizabeth Milbank Anderson House, Long Beach (1912)
- Avis Hotel, Pomona (1915)
- Culver Studios (as the Thomas H. Ince Studios), Culver City (1919)
- Southern California Athletic and Country Club, Lake Elsinore (1924)
- Marti's (Hugh A. Marti Co.) department store, Long Beach (1929)

== See also ==
- List of American architects
- List of people from Los Angeles
