= Eddie Brandstatter =

American restaurateur (1981–2019)

Adolph 'Eddie' Brandstatter
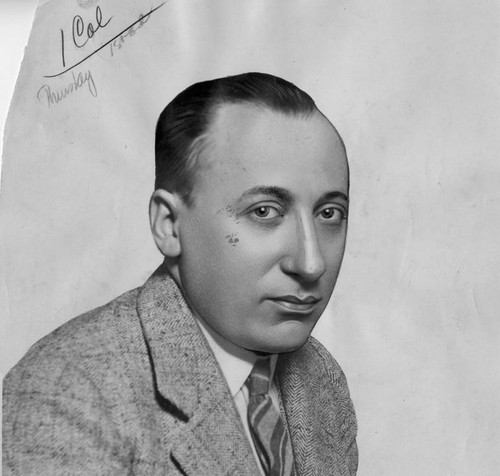
- Eddie Brandstatter in 1927
- Born: 1886; France
- Died: January 20, 1940 (aged 54); Sherman Oaks, California
- Other name: Host of Hollywood
- Occupation: Restaurateur
- Known for: Montmartre Cafe; Embassy Club; Sardi's Hollywood

Adolph 'Eddie' Brandstatter was the first restaurateur in Hollywood, California. He owned and managed several establishments in the neighborhood's early years and was known as the Host of Hollywood.

== Early life ==
Eddie Brandstatter was born in France in 1886. Prior to becoming a restaurateur, he worked in restaurants in Paris, London, and New York City. He moved to Los Angeles in the 1910s.

== Career ==
In 1920, Brandstatter was the manager and joint owner of the Sunset Inn in Santa Monica, California.

In 1923, Brandstatter built and opened the Montmartre Cafe in Hollywood. The establishment, which cost $150,000 ($2.83 million in 2025) to open, was popular amongst members of the film industry and earned the moniker "the center of Hollywood life." Years later, Brandstatter opened Embassy Club in the Christie Realty Building next door. This establishment, a private club, was intended for film stars who sought to escape the crowds at Café Montmartre.

Brandstatter declared bankruptcy in 1932, at which point he sold his establishments. He was also convicted of grand theft of $3000 ($70,793 in 2025) worth of furnishings from C. E. Toberman, although Brandstatter was only given two years' probation after he returned the property that was stolen.

Brandstatter opened the 24-hour Sardi's in 1933 and was later convicted of selling stimulants out of the restaurant. The restaurant, which Brandstatter co-owned with David Covey, was destroyed by fire in 1936. Brandstatter and Covey also owned Lindy's in central Los Angeles during this time.

Brandstatter's last venture was opening and operating Bohemian Grill on Vine Street.

== Personal life and death ==
Brandstatter was married to a woman named Helen, and on January 20, 1940, at age 54, he committed suicide by carbon monoxide poisoning in his home garage. Helen found his body.

== See also ==
- List of people from Los Angeles
