= Henry Weaver House =

Historic house in California, United States

- U.S. National Register of Historic Places
- Santa Monica Historic Landmark
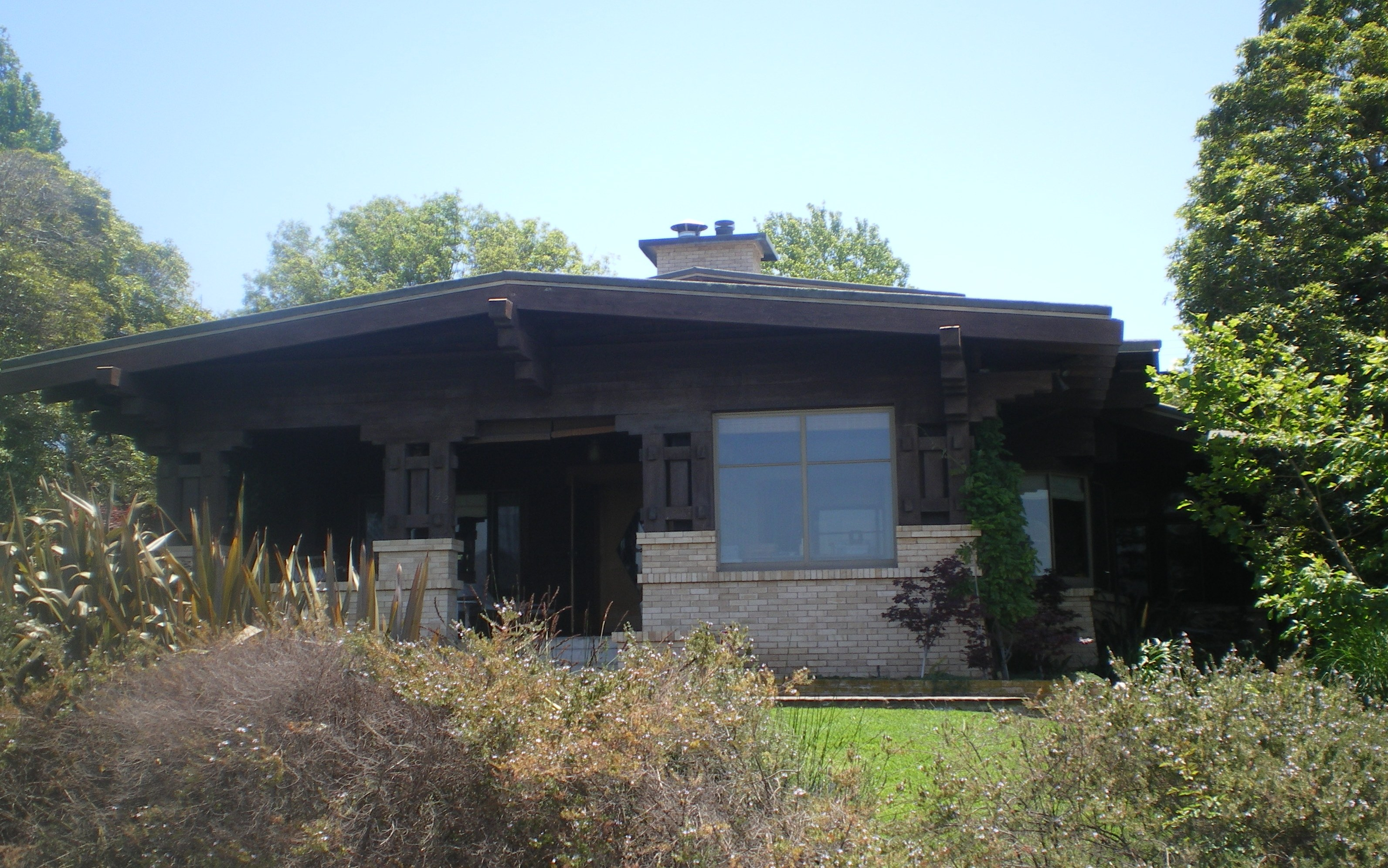
- Henry Weaver House, 2008

- Location within the Los Angeles metropolitan area Location within California Location within the United States
- Location: Santa Monica, California
- Coordinates: 34°1′40″N 118°30′47″W
- Built: 1910
- Architect: Milwaukee Building Co.
- Architectural style: California Bungalow-Craftsman
- NRHP reference No.: 89002114
- SMHL No.: 20

Significant dates
- Added to NRHP: December 27, 1989
- Designated SMHL: May 11, 1989

Henry Weaver House, a California Bungalow, is in Santa Monica, California. It was built in 1910 by the Milwaukee Building Company for Henry Weaver, a Midwestern hotel developer. The house's broad roof overhang, prominent front porch and emphasis on natural colors and materials are unique features of the American Craftsman California Bungalow Style, which "fit the Southland landscape, Southland climate and Southland temperament," according to a 1910 Los Angeles Times article on the Weaver house.

Restoration of the house began in 1985, and the house was listed in the National Register of Historic Places in 1989.

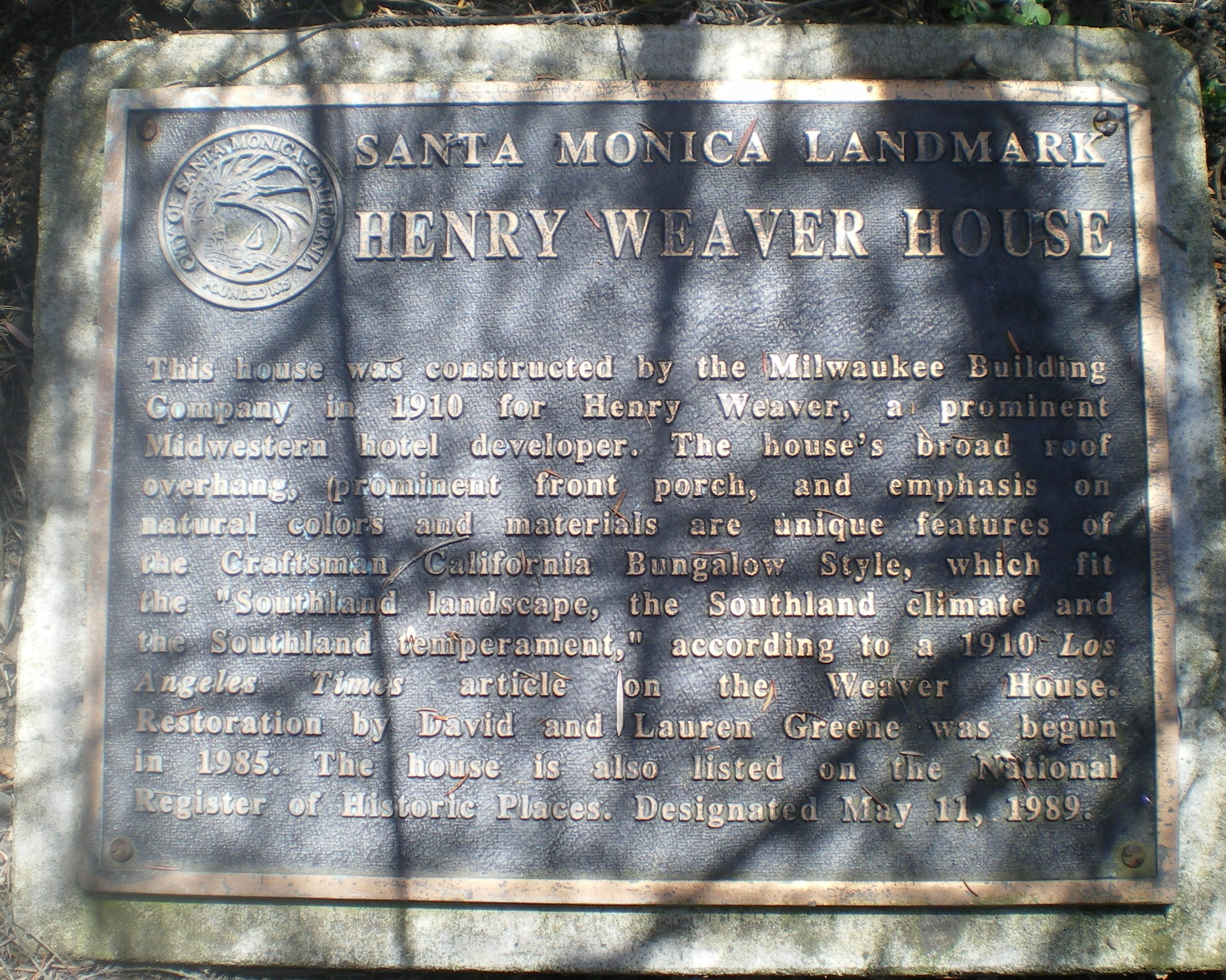
Santa Monica historic landmark plaque

In Los Angeles: An Architectural Guide, David Gebhard and Robert Winter describe it as “A gorgeous example of Craftsman orientalism, worthy of Charles and Henry Greene.”
