= Adventures of Superman (TV series) =

American superhero television series (1952–1958)

- Also known as: Superman; The Adventures of Superman
- Genre: Action; Adventure; Superhero
- Based on: Superman (1938) by; Jerry Siegel; Joe Shuster
- Developed by: Whitney Ellsworth; Robert J. Maxwell
- Starring: George Reeves; Phyllis Coates; Noel Neill; Jack Larson; John Hamilton; Robert Shayne
- Narrated by: Bill Kennedy; Charlie Lyon; Jack Narz; Sam Balter; George Reeves
- Theme music composer: Leon Klatzkin
- Opening theme: Adventures of Superman Theme (Superman March)
- Country of origin: United States
- Original language: English
- No. of seasons: 6
- No. of episodes: 104 (list of episodes)

Production
- Producers: Whitney Ellsworth (1953–1958); Robert J. Maxwell (1951); Bernard Luber (1951)
- Running time: 22–25 minutes
- Production companies: Motion Pictures for Television; National Comics Publications

Original release
- Network: Syndication
- Release: September 19, 1952 – April 28, 1958

Adventures of Superman is an American superhero television series based on comic book characters and concepts that Jerry Siegel and Joe Shuster created in 1938. The show was the first television series to feature Superman and began filming in 1951 in California on RKO-Pathé stages and the RKO Forty Acres back lot. Cereal manufacturer Kellogg's sponsored the show. The first and last airdates of the show, which was produced for first-run syndication rather than for a network, are disputed, but they are generally accepted as September 19, 1952, and April 28, 1958. The show's first two seasons (episodes 1–52, 26 titles per season) were filmed in black-and-white; seasons three to six (episodes 53–104, 13 titles per season) were filmed in color, but were originally telecast in black-and-white. The TV show started with the voice of Bill Kennedy in the introduction.

George Reeves played Superman, with Jack Larson as Jimmy Olsen, John Hamilton as Perry White, and Robert Shayne as Inspector Henderson. Phyllis Coates played Lois Lane in the first season, with Noel Neill, who had previously played Lois in the film serials Superman (1948) and Atom Man vs. Superman (1950), taking over starting with the second season. In the series, Superman battles crooks, gangsters, and other villains in the city of Metropolis while masquerading "off duty" as Daily Planet reporter Clark Kent. In most of the series' episodes, Lois Lane and Jimmy Olsen, Clark's colleagues in the office, find themselves in dangerous situations that only Superman's timely intervention can resolve.

The opening theme is known as The Superman March. In 1987, select episodes of the show were released on VHS. In 2006, the series became available in its entirety on DVD to coincide with the DVD release of Superman Returns, the first Superman feature film in almost two decades. The feature Hollywoodland (2006) dramatized the show's production and the death of George Reeves.

== Production ==
In November 1951, California exhibitor and B-movie producer Robert L. Lippert released a 58-minute black-and-white film starring George Reeves and Phyllis Coates called Superman and the Mole Men, with a script by Robert Maxwell and direction by Lee Sholem. The film served as a pilot for Adventures of Superman and prompted the start of production of the first season in August/September of the same year. The series however discontinued production and remained unaired until September 1952, when cereal manufacturer Kellogg's agreed to sponsor the show, which they had previously done with the Superman radio series. The success of the series came as a complete surprise to the cast. Jack Larson recalled that, at the time, he was in New York City, and his newfound fame caught him off guard. The initial feature film, Superman and the Mole Men, was subsequently edited into a two-part storyline called "The Unknown People" and was to be broadcast mid-season, but it went unaired until the two-parter was added to the syndication package of some stations in 1954. It was the only multi-part storyline of the series, and is sometimes broadcast as the "unofficial" season one finale.

Phyllis Coates in the first-season episode, "Night of Terror".

=== Black-and-white seasons, 1952–1954 ===
Jack Larson

Phyllis Coates, like George Reeves, was a popular lead in B features of the period. For the TV series, Reeves asked that Coates receive equal star billing as Lois Lane, an enterprising reporter who tries to outdo Clark Kent at getting major news stories. Jack Larson's Jimmy Olsen is a Daily Planet intern, often investigating wrongdoings. The villains often catch him, and Superman has to rescue him. In the film noir–like early episodes, Superman is seen as a semi-mysterious presence who is unknown to many crooks, but eventually they know who he is. The first season's episodes usually featured action-packed, dark, gritty, and often violent story lines in which Superman fought gangsters and crime lords. Many characters died in these episodes, with some deaths being shown onscreen.

=== Color seasons, 1954–1958 ===
In the color seasons, the villains were often caricatured, and violence was toned down. The only gunfire that occurred was aimed at Superman, and he was less likely to engage in fisticuffs with the villains. On occasions when he did use physical force, he would take them out in a single blow or by banging them together. More often than not, the villains were likely to knock themselves out while fleeing from Superman. At this point, Jimmy, who was popular with viewers, was being played as the show's comic foil to Superman. Most plots had Jimmy and Lois being captured, only for Superman to rescue them at the last minute.

Noel Neill

Scripts for the sixth and final season reestablished some of the show's seriousness, often utilizing science fiction elements such as a Kryptonite-powered robot, atomic explosions, and impregnable metal cubes. In one of the last episodes, "The Perils of Superman", which was one of three episodes George Reeves directed, stakes were high as the characters found themselves in perilous situations. ABC-TV aired episodes in its "Fun At Five" series during the 1957-58 season.

Reeves appeared as Superman in "Lucy and Superman", an episode of I Love Lucy that aired on January 14, 1957. In the episode, Reeves appears as himself playing TV's Superman, though George Reeves is not mentioned until the credits. The announcement "Our guest star tonight was George Reeves, star of the Superman series" was removed from the episode after its first network broadcast. The episode was colorized and re-broadcast as part of an hour-long Lucy special on the CBS network on May 17, 2015.

=== Theatrical editions ===
Outside of the United States, episodes were edited together and released as theatrical feature films.

=== Stamp Day for Superman ===
Full film, Stamp Day for Superman, 1954

In 1954, at the request of the U.S. Treasury Department, the production company made a special short film directed by Thomas Carr entitled Stamp Day for Superman. It was created to promote school savings-stamp plans to children, and was shown in grade schools during the 1950s. It is the only episode of the series that has entered the public domain. It features Clark Kent/Superman, Jimmy Olsen and Lois Lane as well as Tristram Coffin as a government spokesman and Billy Nelson as a criminal. The film was released on the Season Two DVD box set of The Adventures of Superman as the second season finale.

=== Locations ===
Adventures of Superman began filming at the RKO-Pathé studios, later Desilu Studios, in Culver City, California, in August–September 1951. It was a low-budget program by the standards of its time, as episodes cost roughly $15,000 apiece. From 1953 to 1954, the show was filmed at California Studios and in 1955 it was filmed at Charlie Chaplin Studios. From 1956 to 1957, it was filmed at Ziv Studios.

The establishing shot of The Daily Planet in the first season was the E. Clem Wilson Building in Los Angeles, California, on Wilshire Boulevard, which was famous for decades as the headquarters of Mutual of Omaha. The Carnation Milk Company Building, located a few blocks east on Wilshire, served as The Daily Planet's front door. From the second season onward, stock shots of the 32-story Los Angeles City Hall were used as the Planet building, and the sidewalk entrance to the Planet was a studio-bound "exterior".

Many exteriors in the first season were shot at the RKO Pictures backlot, called "Forty Acres". Hillsides in Culver City, city streets of downtown Los Angeles, and residential areas of the San Fernando Valley were sometimes used as exteriors. In later seasons, filming occurred on sound stages, with exterior shots, such as cars driving along roadways, shot as second-unit material, often with doubles. Establishing shots of Queen of Angels Hospital in the Echo Park section of Los Angeles were often used in episodes such as "The Face and the Voice" during the second season. Another Los Angeles stock footage landmark was the Griffith Observatory, which had several appearances in the series, such as Jor-El's home/laboratory. Aside from a few clips of New York City used in "Superman on Earth", most of the stock clips used to depict Metropolis are of the Los Angeles area.

=== Opening sequence ===
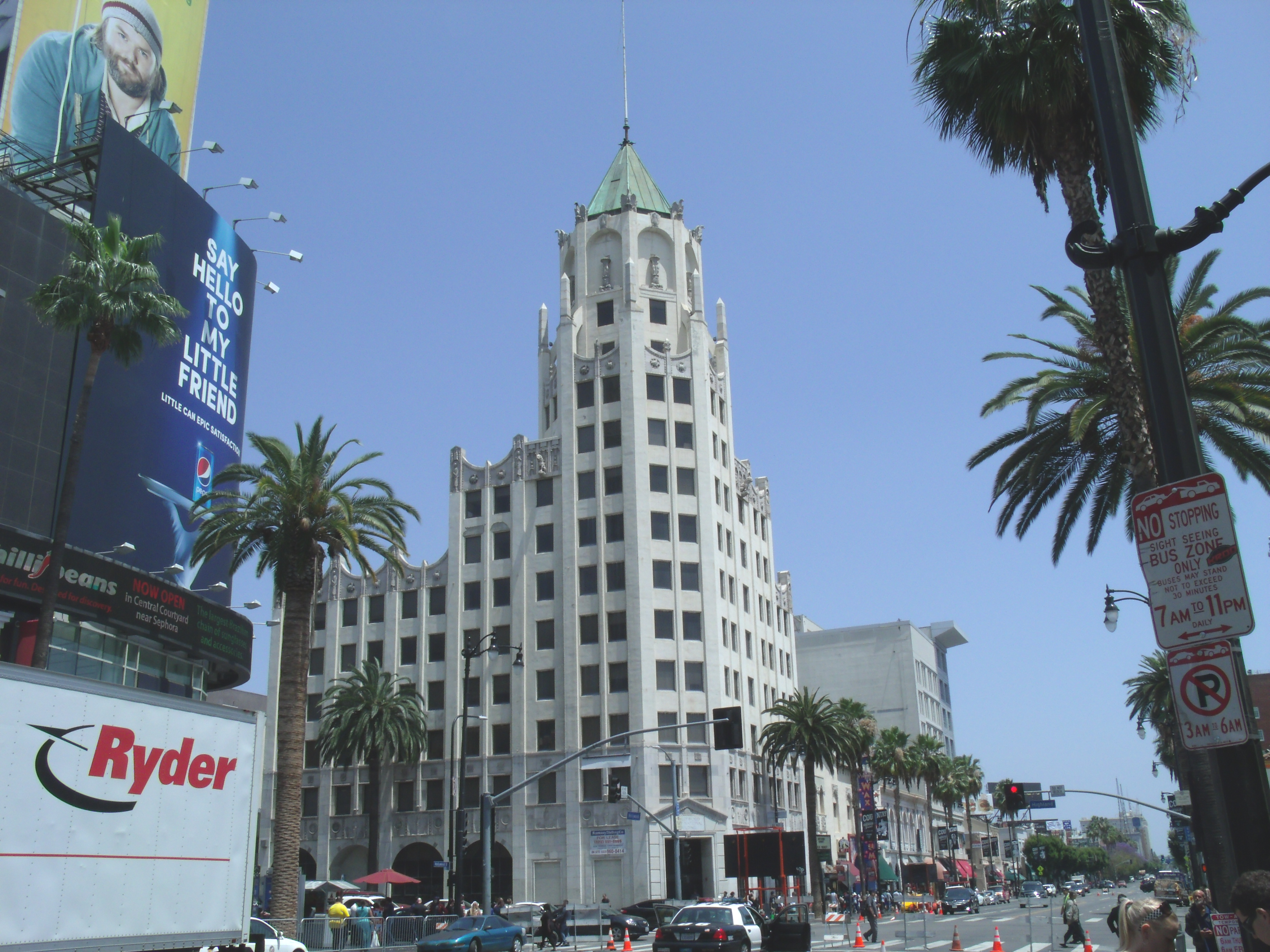
Hollywood First National Bank served as one of the Metropolis backdrops.

The show's title card imitated the three-dimensional lettering of the comic book covers. There have been disputes about the article "the", since it was spoken by narrators in voice-overs. Some references title the show "The Adventures of Superman"; other books, as well as TV Guide listings, simply label the show "Superman". The onscreen title of the show is Adventures of Superman.

Bill Kennedy, framed by the show's theme music, voiced its opening narration, which was expanded from that of the 1940s radio show and the 1940s Superman cartoons. The opening narration of the show set the stage for each program:

Kellogg, 'The Greatest Name In Cereals', presents the Adventures of Superman!

Faster than a speeding bullet! More powerful than a locomotive! Able to leap tall buildings at a single bound!

("Look! Up in the sky!" "It's a bird!" "It's a plane!" "It's Superman!")

Yes, it's Superman ... strange visitor from another planet, who came to Earth with powers and abilities far beyond those of mortal men! Superman ... who can change the course of mighty rivers, bend steel in his bare hands, and who, disguised as Clark Kent, mild-mannered reporter for a great metropolitan newspaper, fights a never-ending battle for truth, justice, and the American way!

And now, another exciting episode in the Adventures of Superman!

From the second season onward, the final sentence ("and now, another exciting episode in the Adventures of Superman!") was dropped. In later syndication, when Kellogg's was no longer the sponsor, the episode openings were re-edited to remove the opening line relating to them.

=== Music ===
The score for the series was taken from stock music libraries, often adaptations of music from B-movies. For example, one cue used in the episode "Peril by Sea" also appears in Plan 9 from Outer Space. Another cue, used in the second season episodes "The Machine that Could Plot Crimes", "Jungle Devil", The Clown Who Cried", and "The Golden Vulture", came from the seventh variation of Miklos Rozsa's "Theme, Variations & Finale", Op. 13, from 1933. There was original music written for the series, such as the March used in the credits. The theme has been ascribed to studio music arranger Leon Klatzkin, although it was certainly adapted from the earlier Superman March written by Sammy Timberg for the 1940's Superman cartoons. Except for the title theme, musical cues ranged in tone and were different for each season, except for the third season, where some cues from the previous season would be reused in several episodes. The opening credits theme, which is used as Superman's "leitmotif", was often used whenever he was depicted flying or in action.

=== Flying effects ===
"Look—up in the sky!" as part of the flying illusion

Superman flies above Metropolis.

While considered simple by today's standards, the "flying" effects on Adventures of Superman were advanced for the time. Throughout the series, Superman's "flying" involved three phases: take-off, flight, and landing. Cables and wires were used for Superman's take-offs early in filming. For season one episodes, stuntmen took Reeves' place whenever cables and wires were used for take offs. At the end of season one, cables and wires stopped being used, and were dropped altogether by the end of season two. As well, special effects head Daniel "Danny" Hayes left the series. By this time, a springboard was brought in for take off scenes, designed by the series' other SFX supervisor, Thol "Si" Simonson. Reeves would run into frame and hit the out-of-frame springboard, which would boost him out of frame, sometimes over the camera, and onto padding. The springboard had enough force, along with subtle camera manipulation, to make it look as though he was actually taking off.

The typical technique for flight sequences had footage of Reeves stretched out on a spatula-like device formed to his torso and leg, operated on a counterweight like a boom microphone, allowing him to bank as if in flight. In some later episodes, such as "The Atomic Secret", Reeves simulated flying, opting to lie on the device without the molded form to support his legs, which are seen to hang from the waist in those episodes.

In the two monochrome seasons, Reeves was occasionally filmed in front of aerial footage on a back-projection screen or against a neutral background, which would provide a matte that would be optically combined with a swish-pan or aerial shot. This footage was matted onto various backgrounds by which he would appear to fly. For the color episodes, the simpler and cheaper technique of a neutral cyclorama backing was used, usually sky-blue for daytime or black for night shots. Techniques for landings involved Reeves jumping off a ladder or holding an off-camera horizontal bar and swinging down into frame.

== Cast ==
=== Main characters ===
George Reeves, John Hamilton, and Robert Shayne

- George Reeves as Kal-El / Clark Kent / Superman, a being from the dying planet Krypton who was sent to Earth in his infancy by his parents, Jor-El and Lara. He lands near Smallville on April 10, 1926 and is taken in by Eben and Sarah Kent, who raise him and name him Clark. As an adult, he moves from Smallville to Metropolis after Eben dies in 1951. In Metropolis, he becomes a Daily Planet reporter under his human name of Clark Kent. Clark Kent is mildly assertive and authoritative during situations when he is not Superman, as he frequently takes charge in emergencies and is not afraid to take risks. He puts his superpowers to work battling crime in Metropolis and is often called upon to rescue his associates Jimmy Olsen and Lois Lane.
- Phyllis Coates (season 1) and Noel Neill (season 2–6) as Lois Lane, a reporter of the Daily Planet and Clark Kent's associate, who suspects he is Superman. She is stated as being 26 years old in the episode "The Tomb of Zaharan". She returns to her hometown in the first-season episode "The Deserted Village".

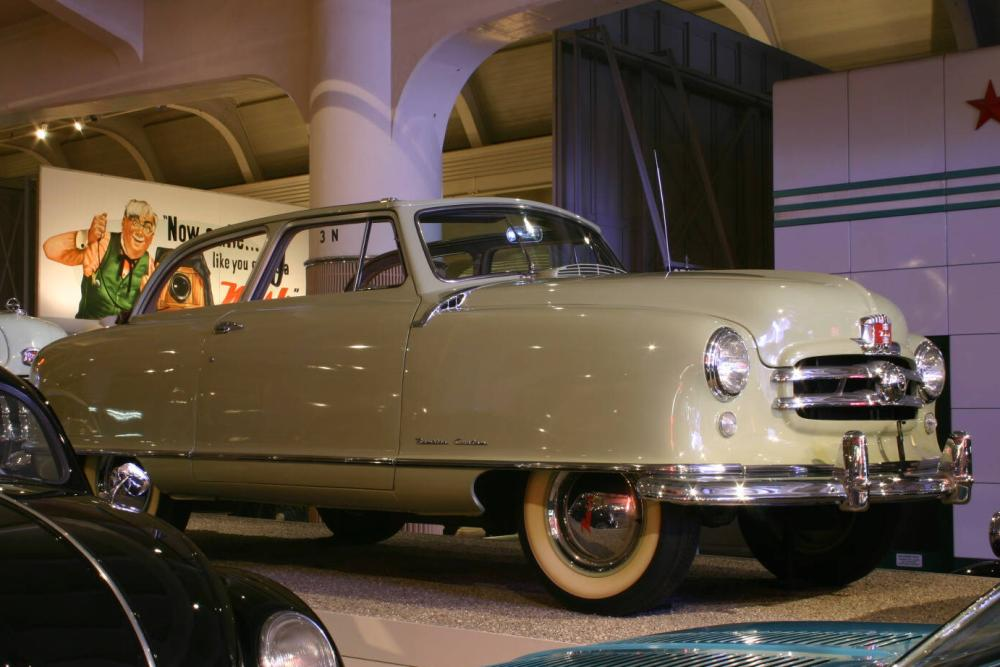
Nash Rambler Convertible "Landau" Coupe c. 1950, with retracting roof and rigid doors, featured car of Lois Lane on the series

- Jack Larson as Jimmy Olsen, a reporter and photographer with the Daily Planet and an associate of Kent and Lane. He serves as the show's comic relief. His mother makes an appearance in an early episode. He lives with his mother at 360 Appletree Lane Apartment #3 in Metropolis. Though boyish in his tastes and sense of humor, he occasionally displays maturity and courage. Larson's credit was elevated to the first position on the featured cast page over Noel Neill for the last two full-color seasons.
- John Hamilton as Perry White, the blustering and impatient editor and publisher of the Daily Planet, who sometimes participates in the exploits of Lois and Jimmy as they pursue news stories. He treats crooks and thugs with disdain and contempt—in one episode, he mentions that he was once a crime reporter. Perry's sister Kate appears in the first-season episode "Drums of Death"; he also has a nephew, Chris, who appears in the second-season episode "Jet Ace".
- Robert Shayne as Inspector Henderson of the Metropolis Police, a friend of the Daily Planet staff who often works with them in crime investigations. He has a teenage son named Ray, who appears in one episode.

Recurring characters include Phillips Tead as Professor Pepperwinkle, Sterling Holloway as Professor Oscar Quinn, Danny Sue Nolan, Aline Towne, and Almira Sessions as Miss Bacharach, and Everett Glass as Professor Lucerne.

=== Special appearances ===
Phillips Tead as Professor Pepperwinkle

Tris Coffin (who was best known for his role as Jeff King in Republic Pictures' King of the Rocket Men from 1949); Herb Vigran; John Eldredge, best known as Harry Archer on Meet Corliss Archer (1954); Philip Van Zandt; and Ben Welden made multiple appearances over the course of the show, always as different villains.

Actors who made Superman guest appearances early in their careers include:

- Claude Akins as Ace Miller, criminal in "Peril by Sea". Akins had appeared with George Reeves two years earlier in the movie From Here to Eternity, and would later play Sheriff Lobo on the 1970s television series B. J. and the Bear and The Misadventures of Sheriff Lobo.
- Mabel Albertson as Kate White, Perry White's sister, in "Drums of Death".
- Denver Pyle as Hatch in "Beware the Wrecker". Pyle would go on to have a prolific career, appearing most notably in multiple episodes of Bonanza and as Briscoe Darling in The Andy Griffith Show.
- John Banner played a butler to a wealthy individual. Banner later became famous as Sgt. Schultz on Hogan's Heroes.
- Hugh Beaumont as Dan Grayson, an ex-convict wanting to reform his life, in "The Big Squeeze". Beaumont is best known for his portrayal of Ward Cleaver on the series Leave It to Beaver, from 1957 to 1963.
- John Beradino as Dexter Brown, in "The Unlucky Number". Beradino would later become better known as Dr. Steve Hardy on General Hospital.
- James Brown as Jim Carson in "Around the World with Superman" (1954).
- Paul Burke as Ace, a criminal, in "My Friend Superman"; Matthew Tips in "Superman Week"; and Rosy in "The Phantom Ring". Burke later starred in the 1960s series Naked City and Twelve O'Clock High.
- Jimmy Dodd as Jake in "Double Trouble".
- Chuck Connors as Sylvester Superman in "Flight to the North"; his later The Rifleman supporting player Paul Fix had appeared in "Czar of the Underworld" and "Semi-Private Eye".
- Billy Gray as Alan, a teenager who snaps a photo of Superman that may reveal the superhero's earthly identity in "Shot in the Dark". Gray would become known as "Bud" Anderson, Jr. in the situation comedy Father Knows Best.
- Dabbs Greer, in "Superman on Earth", the premiere episode, as a man falling from a dirigible; as a man falsely convicted of murder in "Five Minutes to Doom"; and in the dual roles of Mr. Pebble / Dan Dobey in "The Superman Silver Mine". Greer would become well known years later as Reverend Alden on the television series Little House on the Prairie.
- Ed Hinton as Cave Man in "Through the Time Barrier" and as Joe in "The Phantom Ring".
- Russell Johnson as Chopper in "The Runaway Robot". Johnson was later best known for his role as The Professor in Gilligan's Island.
- Joi Lansing as the hot blonde Sergeant Helen J. O'Hara, a policewoman posing as the titular character in the episode "Superman's Wife".
- Tyler MacDuff as Frankie in "The Boy Who Hated Superman".
- Eve McVeagh as Mrs. Wilson in "The Stolen Elephant".
- Vic Perrin as a sailor called "Scurvy" in "The Golden Vulture".
- Ann Tyrrell as Miss Walton in the first-season episode "The Deserted Village".

Other veteran film and television actors making appearances on the show included Dona Drake, George E. Stone, James Craven, Dan Seymour, Victor Sen Yung, Maudie Prickett, John Doucette, Norma Varden, Roy Barcroft, Elizabeth Patterson, and George Chandler.

Director Tommy Carr's brother Steve appeared as an unbilled extra in nearly every one of the first 26 shows and frequently in more substantial character roles. He was also the show's dialogue director and was the man pointing "up in the sky" in the introductions of the black-and-white shows.

== Episodes ==
Season	Episodes	Originally released	
Season	Episodes	First released	Last released
1	26	September 19, 1952	August 10, 1953
2	26	September 18, 1953	March 13, 1954
3	13	April 23, 1955	October 15, 1955
4	13	February 18, 1956	June 16, 1956
5	13	March 8, 1957	May 31, 1957
6	13	February 3, 1958	April 28, 1958

== Cancellation and aftermath ==
Producers planned to continue Adventures of Superman in 1959 with two more years' worth of episodes, to begin airing in the 1960 season. The death of actor John Hamilton threw the plan into disarray. Actor Pierre Watkin was hired to replace Hamilton as "Perry White's brother". Watkin had played Perry White himself in the two Columbia serials and had guested on the series before.

The sudden death of the show's star George Reeves in June 1959 was not the end of the series either, in the producers' eyes. When Jack Larson returned from Europe after the death of Reeves, producers suggested the series could continue as "Superman's Pal, Jimmy Olsen", with more focus on Larson's character, playing opposite a "Superman" who would be a composite of stock shots of George Reeves and a stunt double to be filmed from behind. Larson rejected the idea.

Another spin-off idea was a pilot Whitney Ellsworth produced in 1961: The Adventures of Superboy. Johnny Rockwell starred as a young Clark Kent in Smallville. As Superboy, he wore a suit similar in design to George Reeves' suit. Although thirteen scripts had been written, only the pilot was filmed.

Both Noel Neill and Jack Larson had minor roles in the 2006 film Superman Returns. Neill played the multimillionaire wife of Lex Luthor, played by Kevin Spacey, who dies at the beginning of the film, leaving her entire inheritance to Luthor, while Larson played a bartender.

A CGI version of Reeves as Superman appears in the 2023 DC Extended Universe film The Flash. The film also retroactively establishes that Jay Garrick / The Flash exists in the show's universe.
