= Café Montmartre =

Restaurant and nightclub in Hollywood, California

Coordinates: 34°6′7″N 118°20′19″W

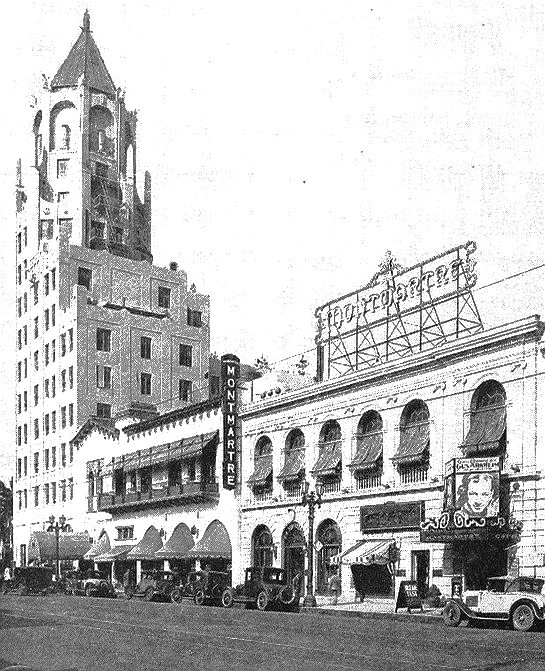
Café Montmartre next to Christie Realty Building and Hollywood First National

Café Montmartre (Montmartre Lounge) was a restaurant and nightclub on Hollywood Boulevard at Highland Avenue in Hollywood, Los Angeles, California, US. Opened in 1923, it became a "worldwide center for celebrity and nightlife" during the 1920s and a place where tourists would visit to try to break into Hollywood.

== History ==
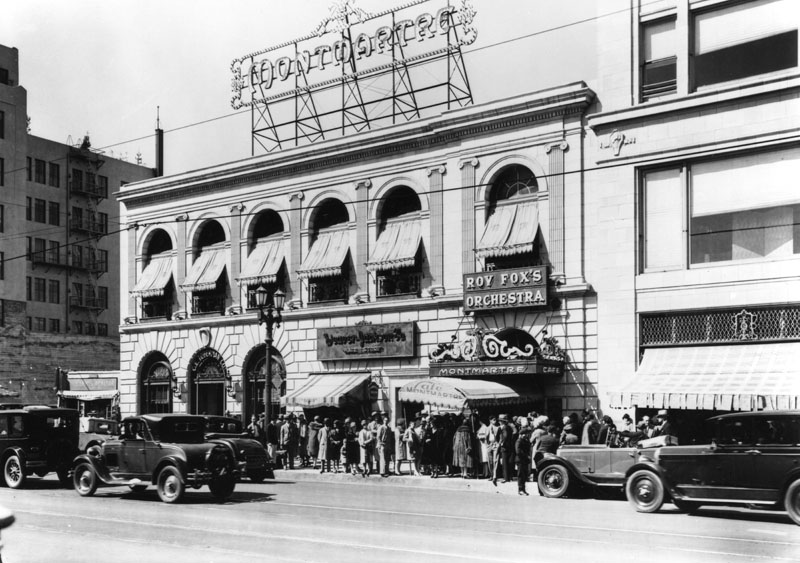
Café Montmartre in 1928

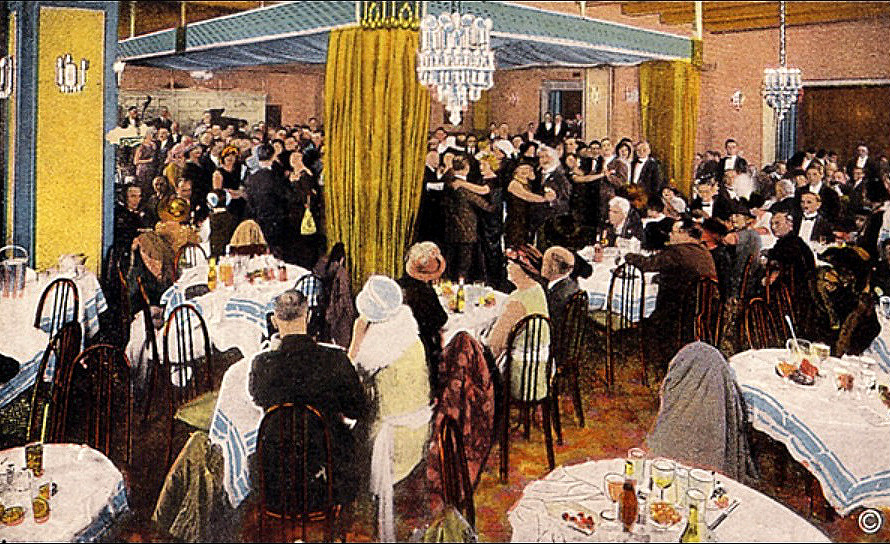
Interior c. 1923

In 1919, Charles E. Toberman bought the property at 6763 Hollywood Boulevard, and three years later, he had a real estate office built on the lot. The building, built by architects Meyer & Holler, included a first floor bank and Café Montmartre on the second floor. Café Montmartre was the first popular nightclub on the boulevard after Adolph 'Eddie' Brandstatter opened it in 1923. Given the dramatic growth of the American film industry in Hollywood at the time, it became a worldwide center for celebrity and nightlife during the 1920s and has been described as the first successful café in Hollywood and the most publicized cafe in the country.

The venue's decline began in 1929 after Brandstatter opened the Embassy Club which drew away clientele from the Cafe Montmartre. He declared bankruptcy in 1932, and subsequently sold the Montmartre. The second floor space later housed the Lee Strasberg Institute before it became the present-day Club Day After, which features the Montmartre Lounge, a private parties' bar, its signage being just the letters "ML". A convenience store has replaced the first floor bank.

In the late 1960s/early 1970s it was Perry's Dance Studio on the second floor. Entrance up the steps at the right end facing the facade. Previously located at North Highland across from Yucca, it relocated here when the Holiday Inn Hotel was built. Perry's Studios was frequented by the dance greats of the 1930s, 1940s, 1950s, and 1960s, closing in the early 1970s. Hollywood's Silver Screen greats, Carmelita Marracci a Ballet Legend, Ted Howard for Tap, Martha Graham mentioned it in her book Dance to the Piper, Napua for Hula, Bobby Banas for Jazz, Lola Montes and her flamenco dancers, Michio Ito for Japanese/Modern, Sol Hurok, Ballet Russe with Adolf Bolm, George Balanchine, Antony Tudor, Anton Dolin, etc. It was run by Barbara Mae Perry, later wife of Disney animator Art Babbitt and Dancer/actress/writer in her own right, d. 5 May 2019, and her mother Victoria Mae Perry, d. @1955.

In 1988, the building was sold for $7.65 million.

== Function ==
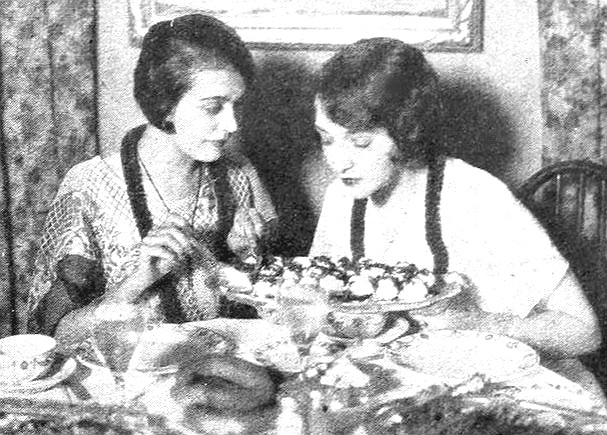
Lila Lee and Bebe Daniels at a table at the venue

It was frequented by some of the top stars and figures in the business at the time, including John Barrymore, Bebe Daniels, Adolphe Menjou, Rudolph Valentino, Bessie Love, Mary Astor, Charlie Chaplin, Fatty Arbuckle, Lew Cody, Douglas Fairbanks, Truman Vandyke, Myrna Loy, and Tom Mix, and writers and businesspeople such as Rupert Hughes, Peter B. Kyne and William Randolph Hearst. It became a symbol of glamor across the United States and gained renown as a place where one could get a ticket to stardom, due to the many film bosses and stars who frequented the venue. Tourists from around the country visited daily, hoping to be spotted and to make their name as a film star. Some were lucky; Don Terry was discovered by Fox screenwriter Charles Francis Coe at the restaurant, who gave Terry his business card and invited him to the Fox lot for a screen test. Terry was later signed as the lead in the 1928 film Me, Gangster, directed by Raoul Walsh.

Bruce Cabot was maitre d' at Montmartre, and its orchestra was led by Vincent Rose and Jackie Taylor. Friday night was "celebrity" night. There was plenty of dancing, and even floor shows with dancers. In addition, men who sat at the "bachelors' table" made themselves available to ladies who wanted to dance at lunch. Special events included a dance contest, which Clara Bow won, Joan Crawford danced the Charleston atop a table, and Rudolph Valentino's tango is mentioned with honors. Hip flasks were common during the prohibition era, and a bootlegger was available, too. On Wednesday and Friday nights, the cafe was frequented by columnist Louella Parsons looking for news.

== Architecture and design ==
- Montmartre
- U.S. Historic district – Contributing property
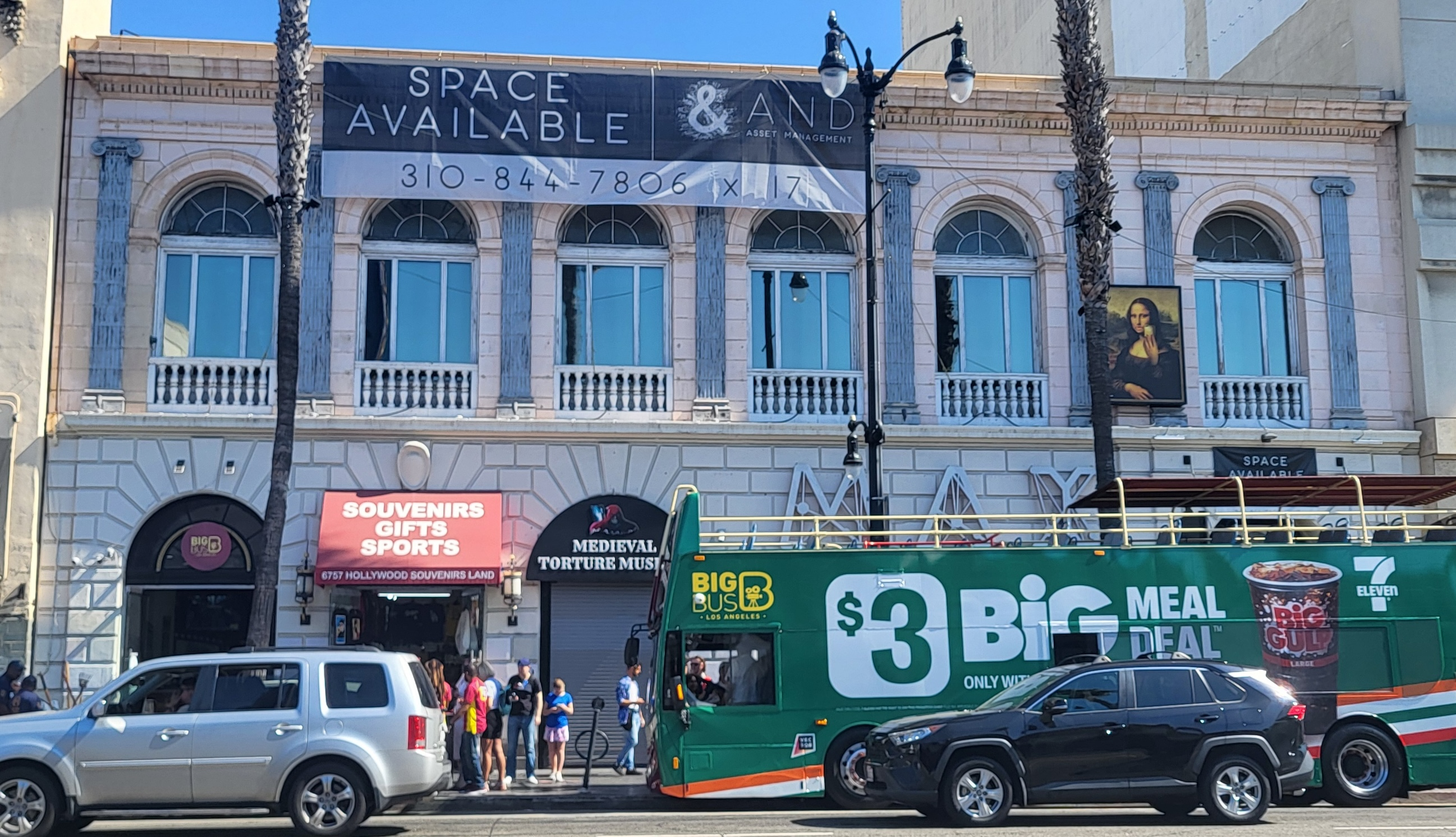
- The building in 2024
- Location: 6755 Hollywood Boulevard, Hollywood, California
- Built: 1922
- Architect: Meyer and Holler
- Architectural style: Parisian/Italian Renaissance (exterior), Romanesque (interior)
- Part of: Hollywood Boulevard Commercial and Entertainment District (ID85000704)
- Designated CP: April 4, 1985

Café Montmartre was designed by Meyer & Holler and built in 1922. It features a Parisian/Italian Renaissance design, meant to resemble a palazzo. The building originally featured Spanish tiling and grilled doors decorated with Mexican wrought-iron. Imported carpeting and chandeliers filled the Romanesque interior.

In 1985, the Hollywood Boulevard Commercial and Entertainment District was added to the National Register of Historic Places, with the Montmartre building listed as a contributing property in the district. Aspects of the building cited in the register include its street level arches, arched windows, Ionic pilasters, marble steps, wrought iron gate, and French design reminiscent of Paris.

== See also ==
- List of contributing properties in the Hollywood Boulevard Commercial and Entertainment District
