= E. Clem Wilson Building =

Building in Los Angeles, California

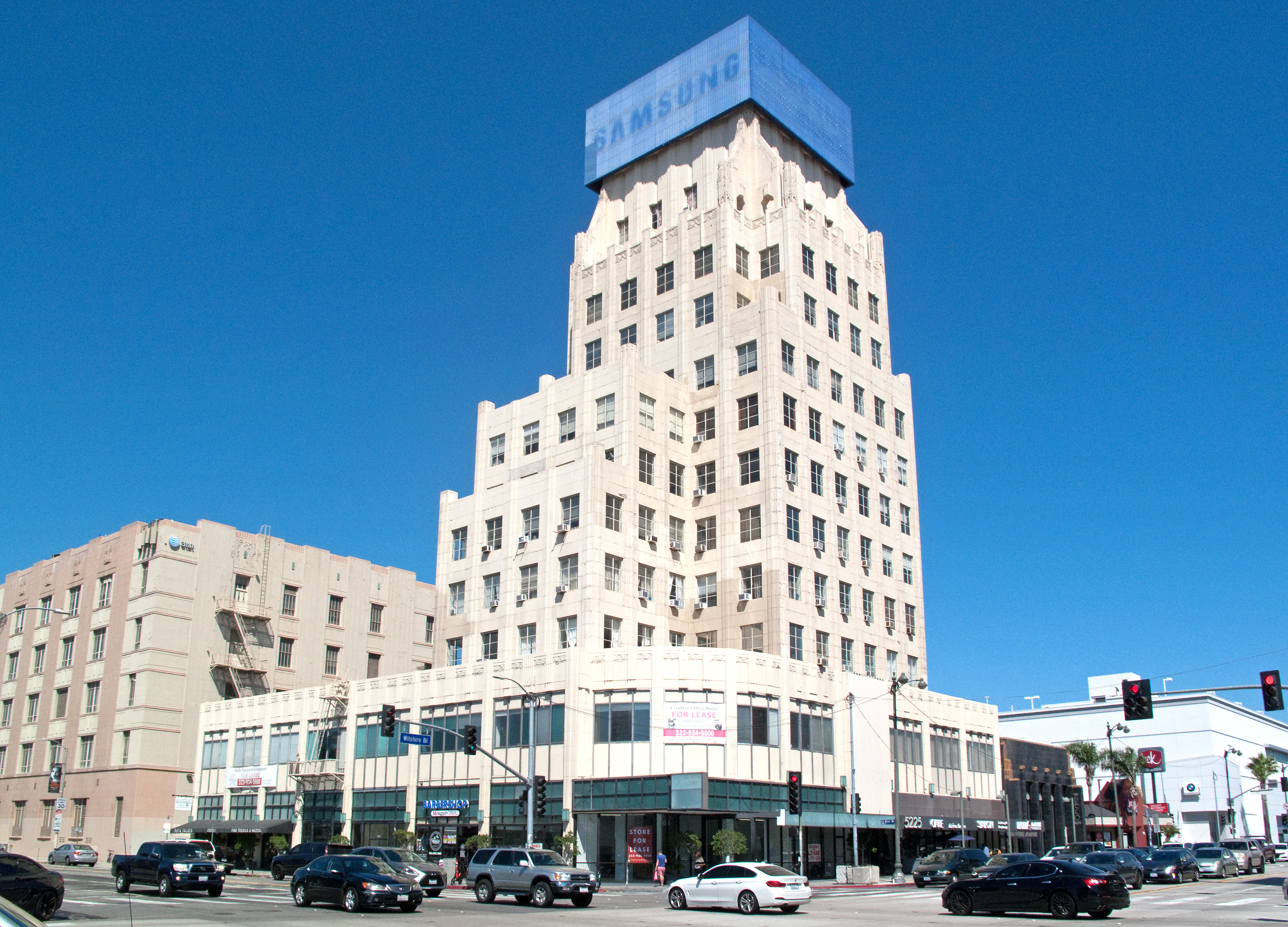
- E. Clem Wilson Building 2019
- Former names: Mutual of Omaha Building; General Insurance Building; General of America Building

General information
- Status: Completed
- Type: Commercial offices
- Architectural style: Art Deco / Art Moderne
- Location: 5225 Wilshire Boulevard; Los Angeles, California
- Coordinates: 34.0625°N 118.3427°W
- Completed: 1929

Height
- Roof: 55.64 m (182.5 ft)

Technical details
- Floor count: 13

Design and construction
- Architect: Meyer & Holler

The E. Clem Wilson Building, also called the Samsung Building, is a 55.64 m (182.5 ft) Art Deco / Art Moderne midrise building at 5225 Wilshire Boulevard at La Brea Avenue in Los Angeles, California.

== History ==
The building has had multiple different names from signage rights, starting with Mutual of Omaha, then becoming Asahi Breweries in 1992 and Samsung in 2001. It now remains a blank blue sign.

The building is currently managed by VisionQuest Ventures.

== In popular culture ==
This building was used as the headquarters of the Daily Planet in the first season of Adventures of Superman.

== Gallery ==
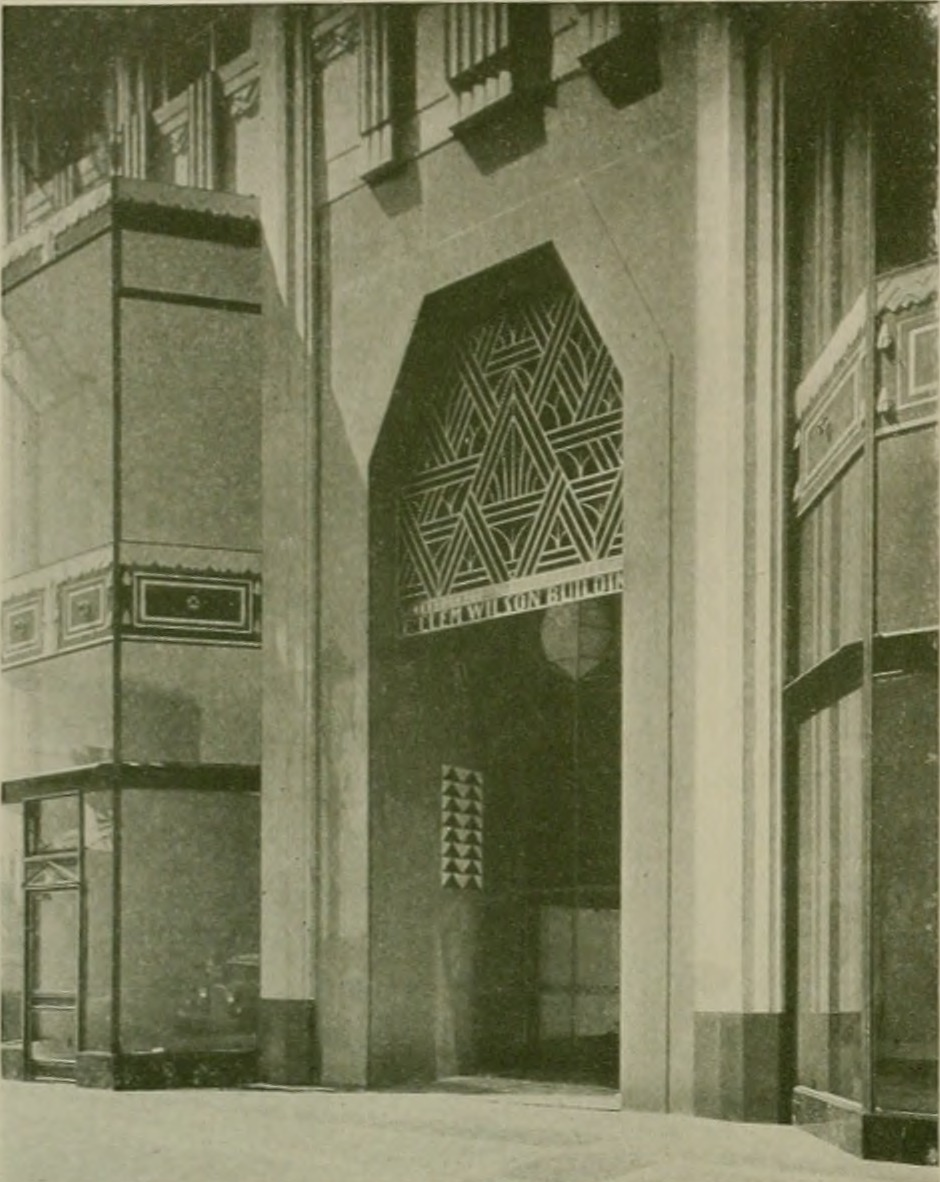
Detail of main entrance, September 1930

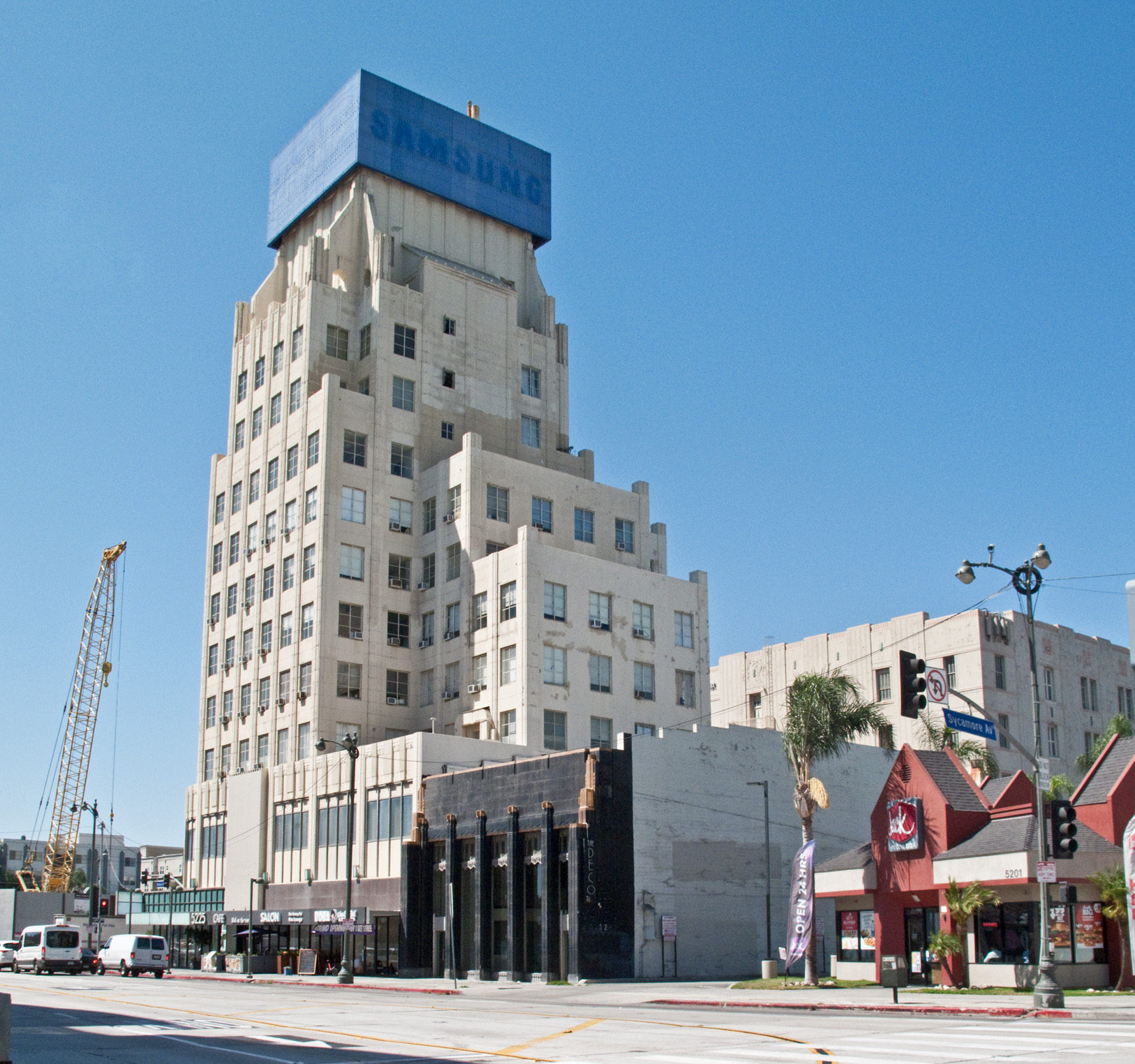
