= Fox Cabrillo Theatre =

Movie theater in Los Angeles, California, United States (1923–1958)

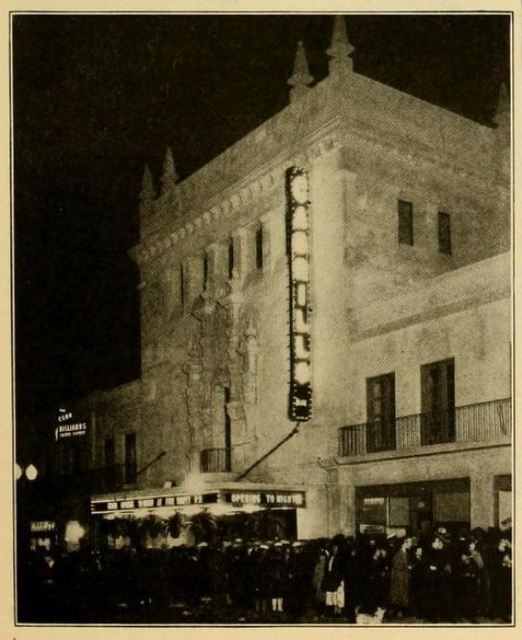
- The theater in 1924
- Interactive map of Fox Cabrillo Theatre
- Address: 115 W. 7th Street; San Pedro, Los Angeles
- Coordinates: 33.73795°N 118.28046°W
- Capacity: 1518
- Type: Movie theater

Construction
- Built: 1922-1923
- Opened: November 15, 1923
- Closed: August 13, 1957
- Demolished: 1958
- Architect: Meyer and Holler

Fox Cabrillo Theatre was a movie theater owned by Fox Theaters and located at 115 W. 7th Street in San Pedro, Los Angeles, California.

== History ==
Fox Cabrillo Theatre was designed by Meyer and Holler and built between 1922 and 1923. It opened on November 15, 1923 with a capacity of 1,518. The building, which was two stories in height, also contained commercial storefronts on the first floor and offices on the second.

The theater, which originally showed vaudeville and silent films, was wired for sound in 1928. It also contained an organ that rose out of the floor.

The theater closed on August 13, 1957, its last screening a double feature of Gun Glory and Man on Fire. The building was demolished the following year and replaced by a parking lot.
