= Aztec Theatre (San Antonio) =

Theatre

Coordinates: 29°25′28″N 98°29′27″W

- Aztec on the River
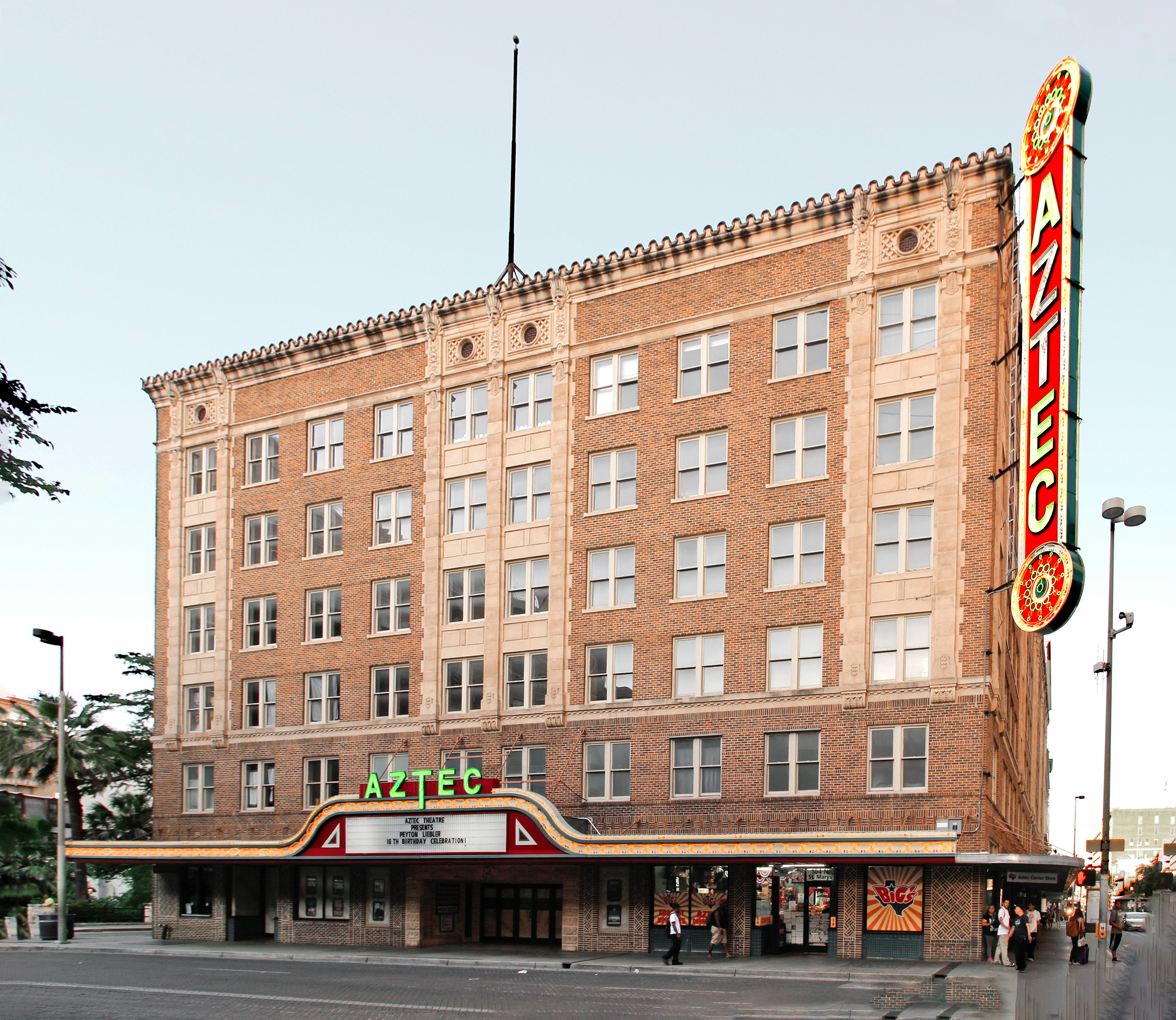
- Exterior view of venue (c.2016)
- Interactive map of Aztec Theatre
- Address: 104 N St Mary's St; San Antonio, TX 78205-2209
- Location: Downtown San Antonio
- Owner: Aztec Family Group
- Operator: Live Nation
- Capacity: 1,477

Construction
- Opened: June 4, 1926
- Renovated: 2007-09, 2013-14
- Closed: 1989-2009; 2012-14
- Cost: $1.75 million ($32.9 million in 2025 dollars)
- Architect: Meyer & Holler

Website
- theaztectheatre.com
- Aztec Theatre
- U.S. National Register of Historic Places
- Architects: Kelly, Robert B.; Pianta, Hannibal
- Architectural style: Mesoamerican
- NRHP reference No.: 92001403
- Added to NRHP: October 22, 1992

The Aztec Theatre is a historic theater in downtown San Antonio, Texas, United States.

== History ==
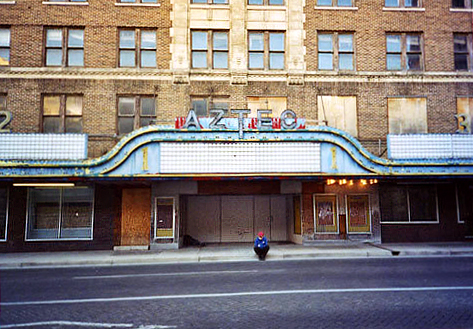
Closed Aztec Theatre in December 2003.

Erected in 1926, the Aztec Theatre is a notable example of the impressive exotic-theme motion picture palaces constructed in the United States during the economic boom of the 1920s. The Kellwood Corporation, owned by Robert Bertrum Kelly (the architect on record) and H.C. Woods, constructed the theater in 1926 with the financial backing of Commerce Reality at a cost of $1.75 million.

The Aztec Theatre was part of the Theater district that included the Empire (1914), the Texas (1926), the Majestic (1929), and the Alameda (1949).

Though the theater remained highly popular for many decades, by the 1970s, it was in decline. It was cut into three auditoriums as the Aztec Triplex, but this only slowed the eventual. In 1989, the Aztec closed. Since October 1992, the theatre has been listed in the National Register of Historic Places, which helped save it from demolition.

Based on San Antonio's Riverwalk, the new Aztec Theatre re-opened in August 2009 as a concert venue. San Antonio Rose Live was a two-hour live show featuring traditional country western, swing, and gospel music. The band featured nine world-class musicians from Nashville, Branson, Austin, and San Antonio. This show closed in February 2012 due to "the current and future economic circumstances".

The Aztec Theatre was leased in September 2013. The new leaseholders are turning the theatre into a multi-purpose event center, which will host public and private functions, as well as provide a venue for musical acts.

In 2015, LiveNation acquired the Aztec Theatre and began hosting concerts, comedy shows, and other live events. The theatre also hosts corporate events, private concerts or parties, and weddings. In 2020, an outside terrace was added off the side of the historic building on the second floor. The terrace space overlooks the Riverwalk and can be rented out for private events.

== Architectural features ==
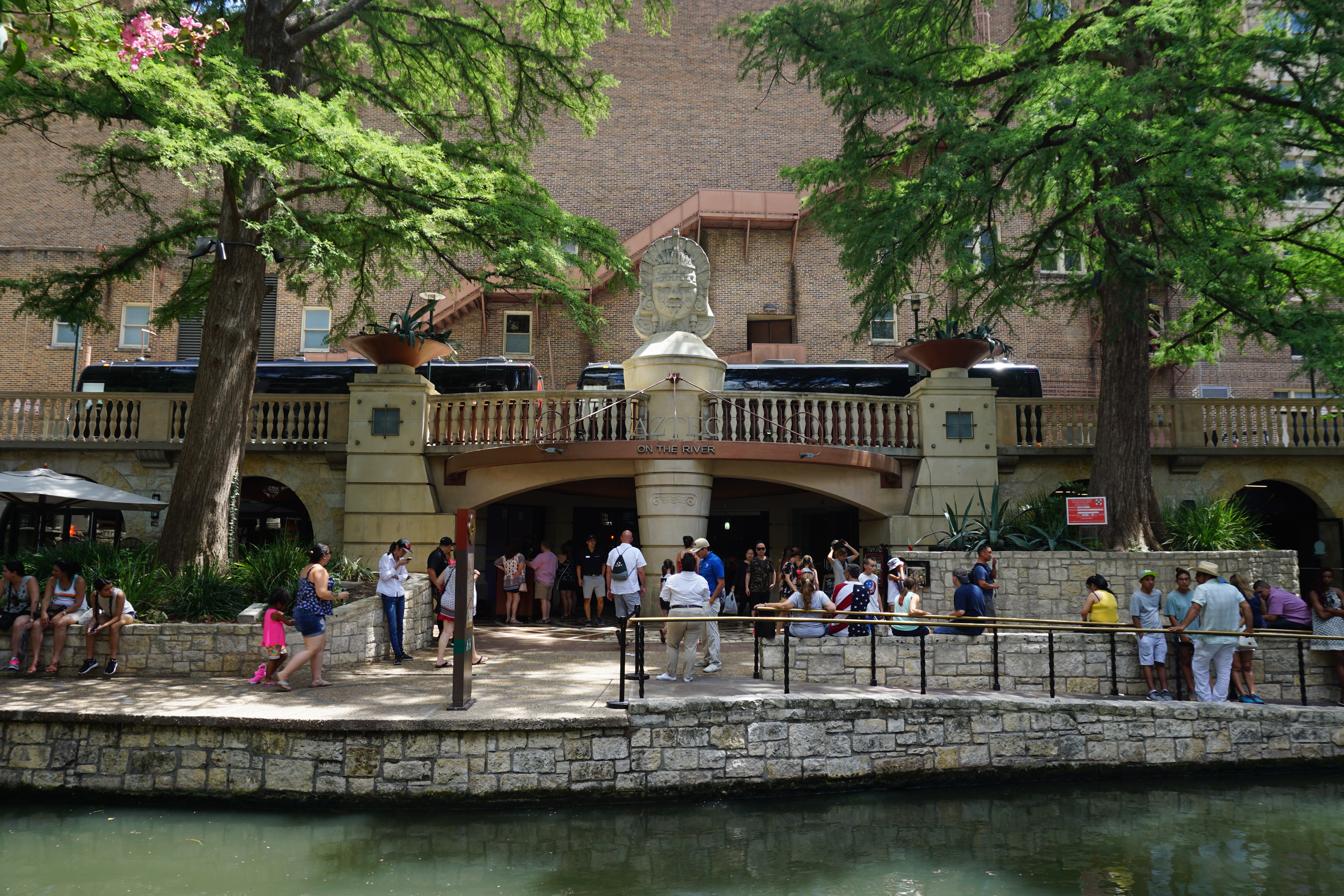
The theatre viewed from the River Walk in 2017

The Aztec was designed by the firm of Meyer & Holler. Listed on the National Register of Historic Places since 1992, it is decorated with vibrantly-colored columns, sculptures, furnishings and murals, many of which are authentic reproductions of Meso-American artifacts. Hanging in front of the stage is the original fire screen, a painting depicting the meeting of the Aztec ruler Montezuma II and Spanish conquistador Hernán Cortés in 1519. The interior of the theater is embellished with fixtures, furnishings, relief carvings, sculpture, plaques, painted symbols and architectural elements inspired by the Aztec, Mixtec, Zapotec, Toltec, and Mayan cultures. The theater is housed in a six-story office building.

A massive three-ton chandelier dominates the theater lobby. Added to the theatre in 1929, the chandelier has been completely restored by the grandson of the original designer. The chandelier was installed the same day the stock market crashed in 1929.

The Aztec Theatre is quoted in Patricia Schultz's travel book 1,000 Places to See Before You Die.

== Noted performers ==
- Alejandra Guzmán
- Ann Wilson
- Better Than Ezra
- Black Veil Brides
- Blue October
- Bullet for My Valentine
- Carly Rae Jepsen
- Citizen Cope
- Collective Soul
- Dave Chappelle
- Eagles of Death Metal
- Garbage
- Goo Goo Dolls
- Good Charlotte
- Jimmy Eat World
- Jonny Lang
- Lauryn Hill
- Limp Bizkit
- Los Lonely Boys
- Metric (band)
- Neon Trees
- Nothing More
- OK Go
- Snoop Dogg
- Stone Temple Pilots
- Switchfoot
- Thievery Corporation
- Toadies
- Tokyo Police Club
- Yellowcard

== See also ==
- House Of Blues
- LiveNation
- San Antonio Conservation Society
