= First National Bank Building (Hollywood, California) =

Building in Los Angeles, California, U.S.

- U.S. Historic district – Contributing property
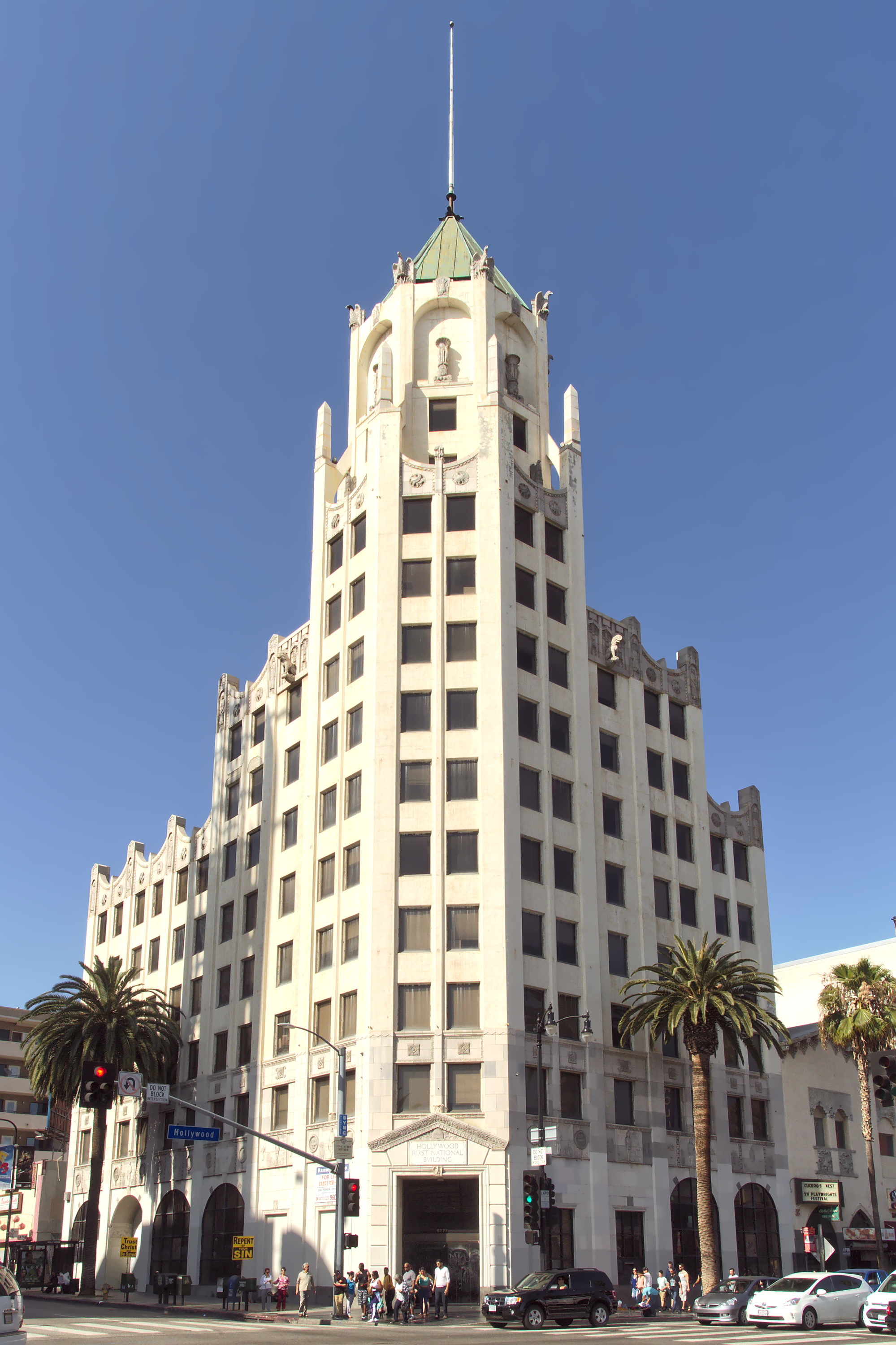
- The building in 2015

- Location within the Los Angeles metropolitan area
- Location: 6777 W. Hollywood Blvd. and 1700 Highland Avenue, Hollywood, California
- Coordinates: 34.102°N 118.338°W
- Built: 1928
- Architect: Meyer & Holler
- Architectural style: Art Deco, neo-Gothic
- Part of: Hollywood Boulevard Commercial and Entertainment District (ID85000704)
- Designated CP: April 4, 1985

Hollywood's First National Bank Building, also known as Hollywood First National, Security First National, and Security Pacific, is a historic thirteen-story building at 6777 W. Hollywood Blvd. and 1700 Highland Avenue, in Hollywood, California.

== History ==
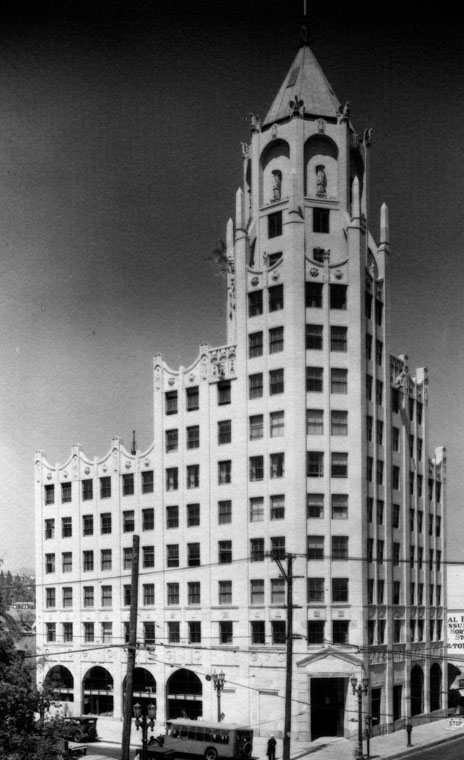
Hollywood's First National Bank Building in 1927

Hollywood's First National Bank Building, built in 1927 and opened 1928, was designed by Meyer & Holler, the same architectural firm that designed the nearby Chinese and Egyptian theaters. The building, along with Bank of America Building across the street, anchored the corner of Hollywood and Highland, and upon completion, it was the second tallest building in Los Angeles. It was built on the site of a two-story First National Bank Building, which was demolished to make way for this building.

In 1985, the Hollywood Boulevard Commercial and Entertainment District was added to the National Register of Historic Places, with Security Pacific listed as a contributing property in the district.

The building has been vacant since 2008.

== Architecture and design ==
Hollywood's First National Bank Building combines art deco and neo-Gothic styles to create a design meant to suggest the sense of fantasy in the area. The building is thirteen stories in height, made of reinforced concrete, and features an elaborate stepped tower and a facade decorated with medieval figures (including gargoyles), floral patterns, and medallions. Additional bas-relief panels depicting Nicholas Copernicus and Christopher Columbus are meant to symbolize discovery and enterprise.

== Filming location ==
Hollywood's First National Bank Building has served as a filming location for several movies and television shows, most notably Adventures of Superman and Twins.

== See also ==
- List of contributing properties in the Hollywood Boulevard Commercial and Entertainment District
