= Kari Barba =

American tattoo artist

- Born: July 10, 1960 (age 66); Minneapolis
- Known for: Illustrative Realism style tattooing

Kari Barba (born July 10, 1960) is an American tattoo artist and painter from Minneapolis. Barba has been practicing art for over 45 years and is best known for her work for women within the tattoo industry. Barba is based in Long Beach, California. She is co-owner of Outer Limits Tattoo in Long Beach, CA, the oldest tattoo shop in the United States. She also owns Outer Limits Tattoo in Costa Mesa

== Background ==
At 19 years old, Barba began her tattoo art career. In 1980, she moved from Minnesota to California to pursue tattooing full time. By 1983, she opened her first tattoo shop in Anaheim, California, Twilight Fantasy. From the beginning, Barba prioritized hiring female tattooers in order to diversify the notoriously male industry.

Since 1985, Barba has earned more than 500 awards for tattoo excellence. She won the Best Tattooist and also Best Overseas Tattooist twice. In 1985, she won Best Black and Grey Tattoo in Seattle, WA. In 1987, she won her first National Tattoo Associations' Tattooist of the Year.

Barba is known for her illustrative realism style. She is one of the first artists to tattoo in the style of color realism. Barba was one of the first tattoo artist to wear gloves and wrap her equipment, and therefore recognized for spearheading the sterile standards in the tattoo industry.

Her accomplishments include the acquisition of a historically important tattoo shop and museum. In 2002, Barba acquired 22 S. Chestnut Pl in Long Beach. The location, originally opened by renowned tattooist Bert Grimm, has operated as a tattoo shop since 1927. The shop also houses a tattoo museum paying tribute to The Pike and artists past.

A silicone arm tattooed by Barba was featured in an exhibition at the Natural History Museum of Los Angeles County in 2018. Barba is regularly part of the jury of experts for the Mondial du Tatouage in Paris, France.

Barba's final apprentice is her granddaughter and tattooist Mia Barba.

== Exhibitions ==
- 2021 "Art Under the Skin", Caixa Forum Museum, Madrid, Spain
- 2018 "Tattoo", Museum of Natural History, Los Angeles, California
- 2017 "Tattoo" Field Museum, Chicago, Illinois
- 2014 Tatoueurs Tatoués, Musée du quai Branly - Jacques Chirac Paris, France

== Personal life ==
Barba is married to her wife of 19 years, Teri Mullins. Barba's son is a tattooist and shop owner and her daughter is a successful professional at Orange Coast Community College. She has two granddaughters, one of which is an apprentice under Barba at her Long Beach location.
