= Rick Walters (tattoo artist) =

American tattoo artist

- Born: September 5, 1945; Chicago, Illinois, U.S.
- Died: March 4, 2019 (aged 73); Long Beach, California, U.S.
- Occupation: Tattoo artist

Rick Walters (September 5, 1945 – March 4, 2019) was an American tattoo artist. He was known for his take on American traditional tattooing.

== Biography ==
Rick Walters was born in Chicago, Illinois on September 5, 1945. He grew up in Hawthorne, California.

In 1959, he went to the Pike, an amusement zone in Long Beach, California, and got a tattoo on his leg. He found work as a machinist and welder after high school. In his off time, he went to the Pike and learned tattooing under Bob Shaw, Owen Jensen, and Hong Kong Tom.

From 1978 to 2002, Walters worked as the manager of Bert Grimm's World Famous Tattoo, the oldest continuously operated tattoo shop in the United States. After the closing of the shop, he retired for several months, but after having a heart attack, he went back to tattooing. In the 2010s, he opened a tattoo shop, Rick Walters' World Famous Tattoo Parlor, in Sunset Beach, California.

He taught multiple tattoo artists in Southern California the rules and rites of American traditional tattooing.

He died at the age of 73 on March 4, 2019. He had been battling health issues after doctors found blood clots in his lungs to add to myriad other ailments.
