= Color realism =

Color realism or colour realism may refer to:

- Color realism (art style), a fine art style where accurately portrayed colors create a sense of space and form
- Color realism (philosophy), a philosophical position that holds that colors are physical properties that objects actually possess
