= Jack Rudy =

American tattoo artist

- Born: 1954
- Died: 2025 (aged 70–71)
- Citizenship: American
- Occupations: Tattoo artist, club president
- Years active: 1975 - 2025
- Employer(s): Goodtime Charlie’s Tattooland (artist), Tattooland (president)
- Organization: Beatnik's Car Club

Jack Rudy (Feb. 25, 1954 – Jan. 26, 2025) was an American tattoo artist notable for his development of the black-and-gray style of tattooing, including realistic portraits, and his use of a single needle for fine line work.

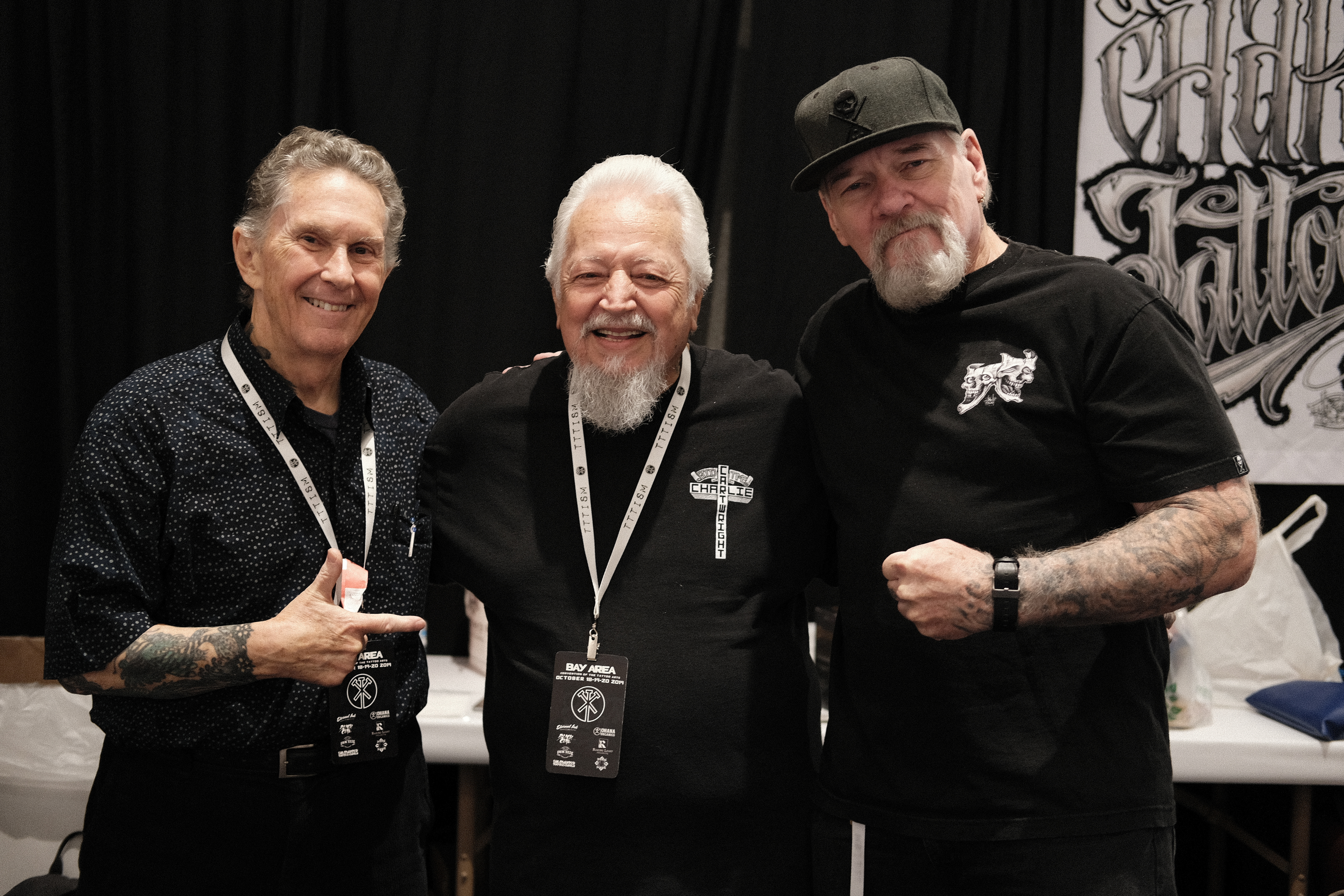
Jack Rudy (Right) with Charlie Cartwright (Center) and Don Ed Hardy (left) at the Bay Area Convention of the Tattoo Arts in Burlingame, California on October 19, 2019

== Career ==
After leaving the Marines in 1975, Rudy began his career as an apprentice at Goodtime Charlie’s Tattooland, in East Los Angeles. Under the watch of Charlie Cartwright, a friend he met while visiting the old Long Beach Pike, Rudy and Cartwright began to hone their craft of single-needle, black-and-gray style tattoos. Rudy was known for his use of light and dark shades of black and grey. In addition to creating a softer and more realistic style of tattooing, with the advent of the new single needle tattoo technology, artists were now able to use a much greater level of detail than previously attainable utilizing older and more readily accepted tattoo machine and needle configurations. As the client base of East Los Angeles began requesting this "penitentiary-style", the pair decided to create a single-needle configured tattoo machine.

Rudy was the president of the Beatnik's Car Club - a car club which requires the members to own 50s-styled hot rods and "lots of tattoos". He was the owner of Tattooland, an "old school" street shop, located in Anaheim, California.
