= Bert Grimm =

American tattoo artist (born 1900)

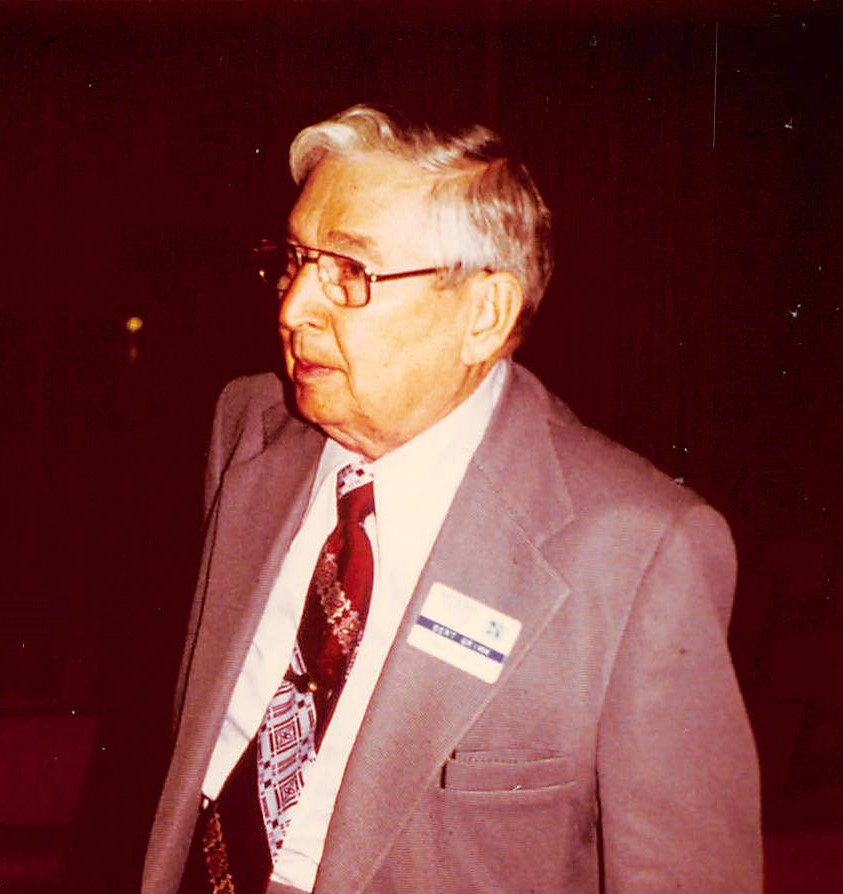
- Bert Grim in 1982
- Born: Edward Cecil Reardon; February 8, 1900; Springfield, Missouri, US
- Died: June 15, 1985 (aged 85); Warrenton, Oregon, US
- Other names: Bertram Cecil Grimm
- Occupation: Tattoo artist
- Spouse: Julia Florence Grimm (nee Lechler)

Bert Grimm (born Edward Cecil Reardon, February 8, 1900 – June 15, 1985) was an American tattoo artist dubbed the "grandfather of old school". Grimm's work and mentorship contributed to the development and popularity of the American Traditional tattoo style. He is said to have tattooed Bonnie and Clyde and Pretty Boy Floyd, among others.

== Personal life ==
Edward Cecil Reardon was born in Springfield, Missouri to John Elmer Reardon and his wife Carrie Elizabeth Shull Reardon, one of twelve children. He grew up in Portland, Oregon. At some point he changed his name to Bertram Cecil Grimm. He married Julia Florence Lechler on February 7, 1931. Grimm died 15 June 1985 in Warrenton, Oregon.

== Career ==
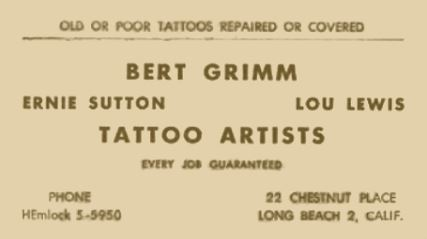
Business card circa 1940

From a young age, Bert would hang around Portland's local tattoo shops of Sailor Gus, Sailor George, and Charlie Western, and obtained a tattooing kit of his own at around 12 years old. At fifteen years old, Bert left home and took up work with carnivals, where he learned to tattoo, including a season with Buffalo Bill Cody’s Wild West caravan.

Grimm opened his first tattoo store in Chicago in 1916. Here in the off-season, he would work his trade on South State Street, while continuing to travel the carnival circuit in the summer months. In 1923 he retired from the carnival scene and shortly thereafter secured an apprenticeship in Portland with Sailor George Fosdick. Less than a year later, he relocated to Los Angeles, where he commenced a two-year apprenticeship with Sailor Charlie Barrs. Both mentors were champions of the American Traditional style, which in turn influenced Grimm's own stylistic direction.

In 1928, Bert set up shop in St. Louis, Missouri, and over the course of 26 years built up a highly successful shop tattooing military men and in-port riverboat workers, and established a reputation as one of "the best ink slingers in the Midwest". His shop was located on North Broadway at Market Street.

Later Grimm operated stores in Honolulu, Salt Lake City, Las Vegas, Seattle, Los Angeles, Long Beach, Portland, and China, however he is perhaps best known for his shop on The Pike at Long Beach, California where he hosted and mentored such artists as Owen Jensen, Bob Shaw, Lyle Tuttle, Don Nolan, Phil Sims and Dave Gibson. While at The Pike, Grimm also influenced a young Don Ed Hardy, who spent time observing Grimm at work.

After Bert retired to Oregon in 1965, his three shops in Long Beach, San Diego and Portland were eventually taken over by Bob Shaw. In 2003, Kari Barba purchased Grimm's shop at 22 Chestnut Place, now named Outer Limits Tattoo and Museum. It remains one of the oldest continuously operating tattoo shops in the continental United States.
