= The Pike =

Former amusement zone in California

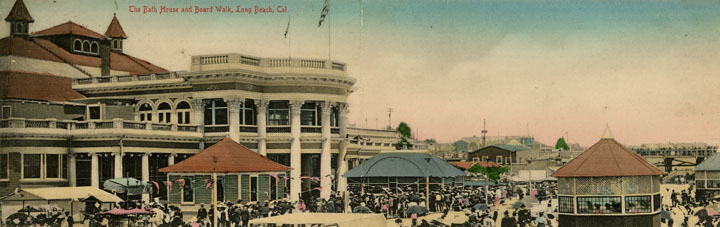
- The Bath House and Board Walk, Long Beach, c. 1907
- Interactive map of The Pike
- Location: Long Beach, California, United States
- Coordinates: 33°45′58″N 118°11′21″W
- Status: Defunct
- Opened: 1902
- Closed: 1979

The Pike was an amusement zone in Long Beach, California. The Pike was founded in 1902 along the shoreline south of Ocean Boulevard with several independent arcades, food stands, gift shops, a variety of rides and a grand bath house. It was most noted for the Cyclone Racer (1930–1968), a large wooden dual-track roller coaster, built out on pilings over the water.

The Pike operated under several names. The amusement zone surrounding the Pike, Silver Spray Pier, was included along with additional parking in the post-World War II expansion; it was all renamed Nu-Pike via a contest winner's submission in the late 1950s, then renamed Queen's Park in the late 1960s in homage to the arrival of the Queen Mary ocean liner in Long Beach. 1979 was the year Long Beach city council refused to renew the land leases and demolished all of the structures and attractions it could that weren't trucked away. The Pike museum is located in Looff's Lite-A-Line at 2500 Long Beach Blvd. (Now closed.)

== History ==
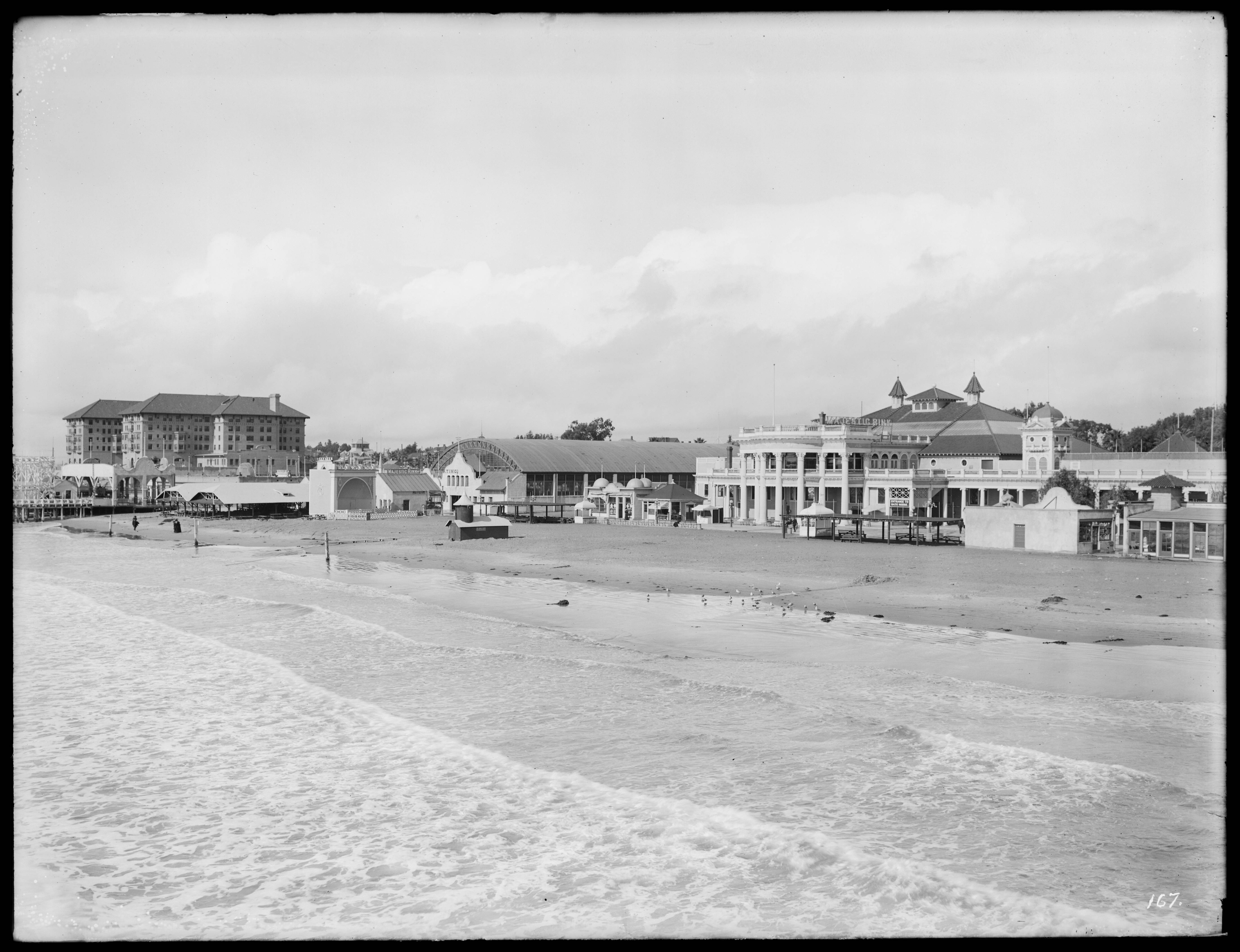
Hotel Virginia, bathhouse, and Majestic Rink as viewed from the pier, ca.1910-1912

The first major attraction to the seashore at Long Beach was recreational bathing, long before trains and cars, when the only roads were dusty rutted paths littered with horse manure. Residents of Southern California escaped the summer heat by crowding the shore and beaches to enjoy the cool ocean breeze and the Pacific Ocean chilled by the Aleutian current. With the surge of health-conscious new residents and the ease of access to a beach near the services of local merchants, Willmore City became a destination. In 1888, Long Beach Land and Water Company bought William E. Willmore's failed plat of Bixby's Rancho Los Cerritos and changed the name to Long Beach in 1892. The amusement zone began in 1902, as a beach and grand bath house resort at the Long Beach terminus of the Red Car interurban commuter electric railroad system Pacific Electric Railway southern expansion from Los Angeles. A grand bath house was constructed at the shore, scheduled to open Independence Day, 1902. The grand opening of the bath house, known later as The Plunge, coincided with the inaugural run of the Pacific Electric Railway Long Beach Line on the morning of July 4, 1902 – which established service connecting communities along the line to offices and shopping in downtown Los Angeles as well as bringing bathers and families south to Pacific Ocean shoreline recreation.

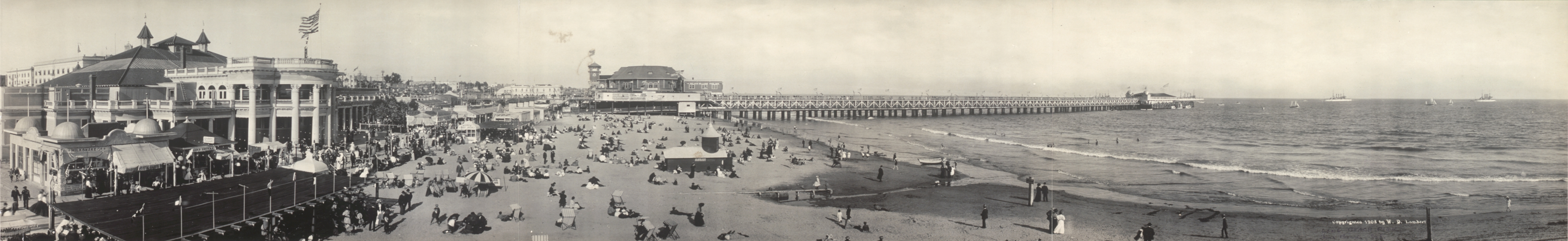
1908 view

=== Long Beach Municipal Pier ===
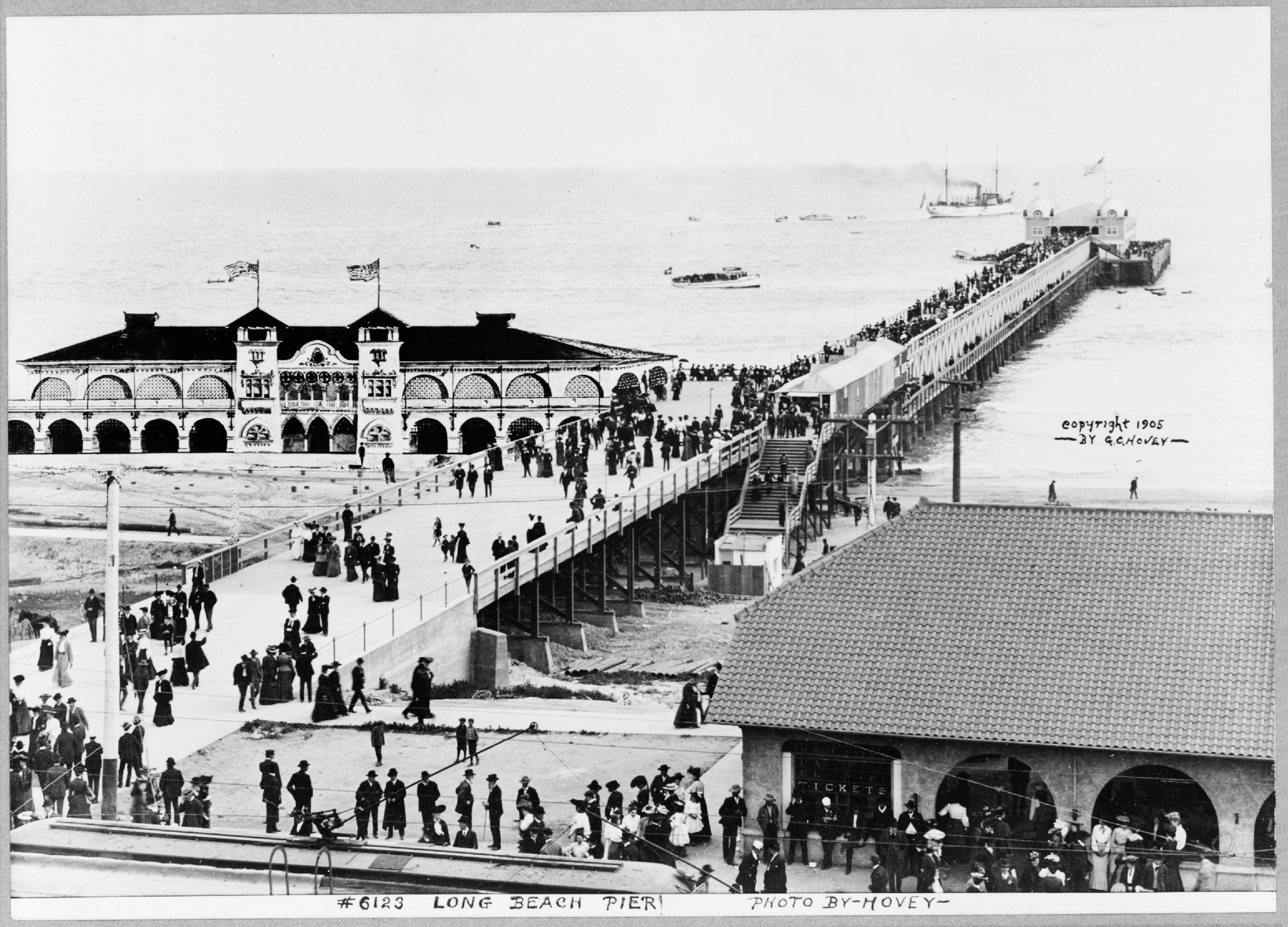
Long Beach Municipal Pier, 1905

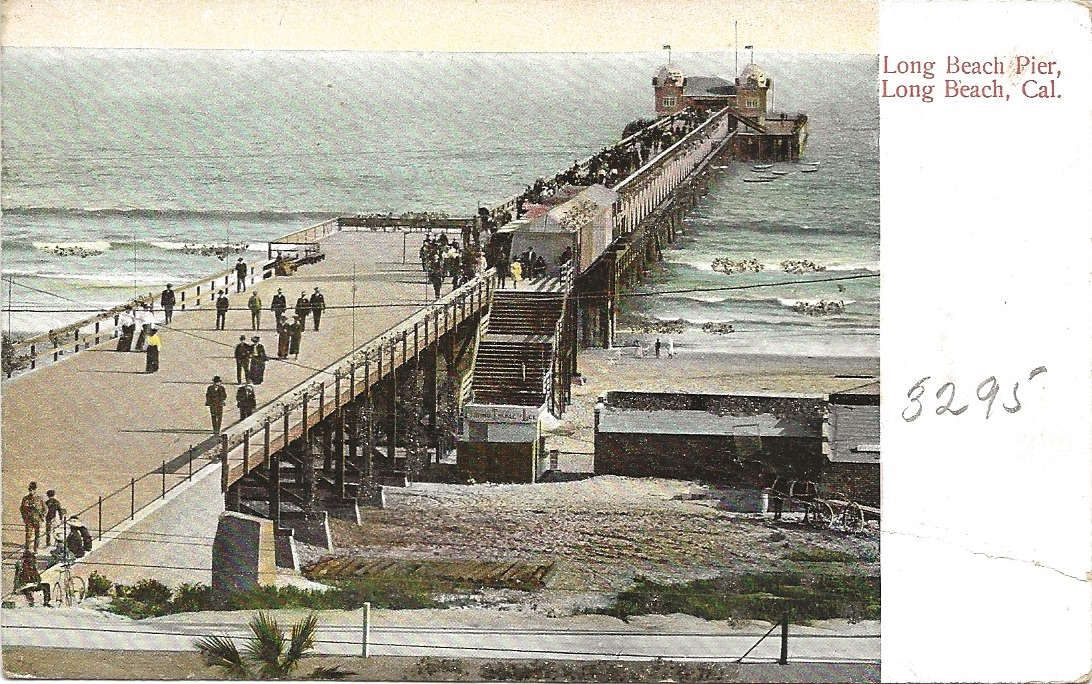
The pier, ca. 1910

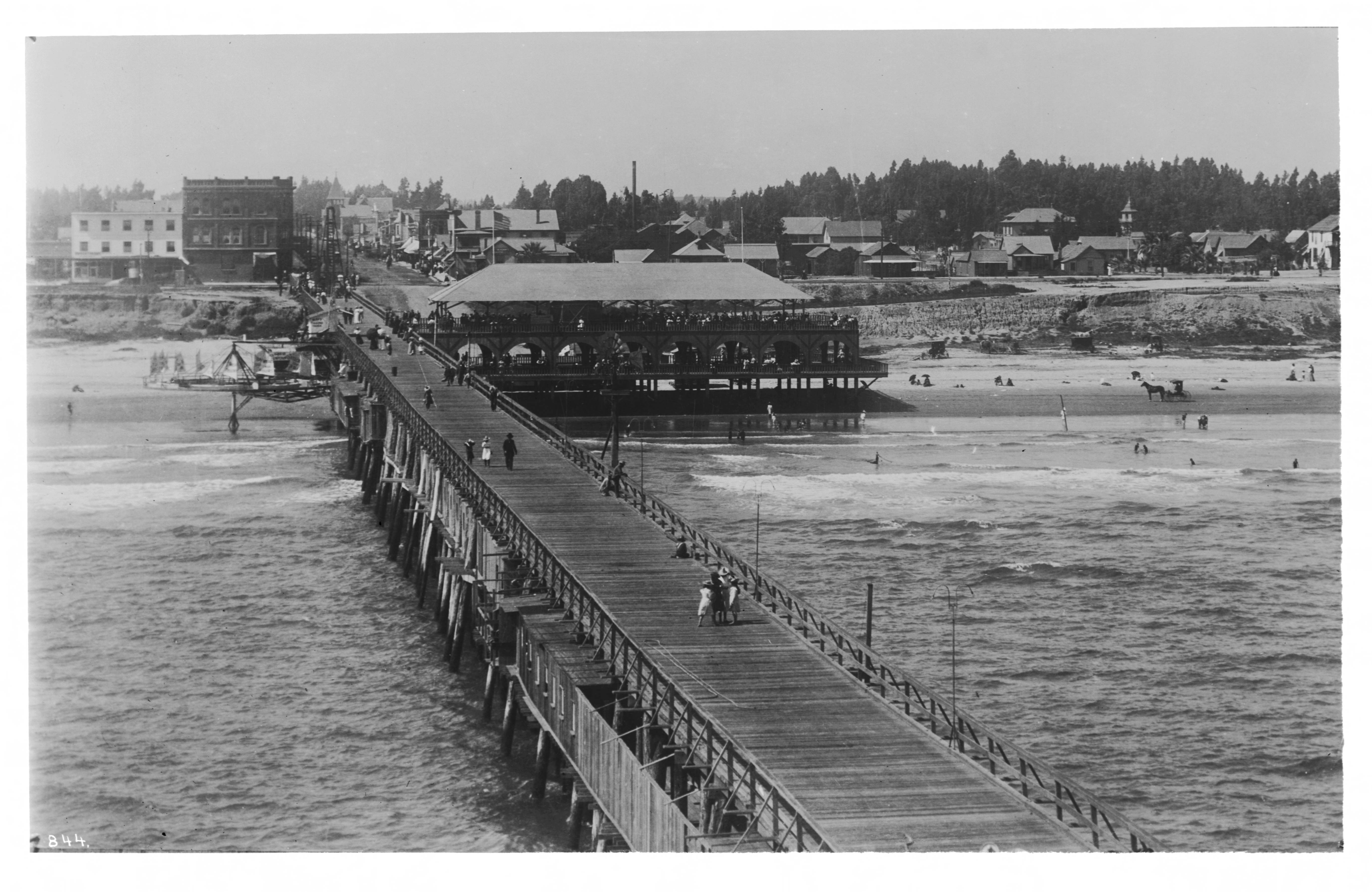
Looking towards the shore from the pier; a horse-drawn carriage sits on the beach, c. 1895-1905

Stretching Pine Avenue south from Ocean Avenue into the Pacific Ocean, the Long Beach Municipal Pier had an upper and lower deck to a service building on the end. Sheltered at the mouth of the Los Angeles River, the public pier served a range of purposes, primarily for trade and commerce, servicing freight and passenger shipping, but also served anglers fishing as well as pedestrian strolling. A simple wooden boardwalk was laid directly at the top of the sand west along the shoreline connecting the pier to the new bathhouse.

=== Pike, a simple boardwalk ===
Pike was the name of the wooden boardwalk connecting the Pine St. incline of the Long Beach Pier west along the shoreline to The Plunge bath house. It gradually grew in length, was widened, and later poured in concrete and illuminated with strings of electric bulbs as The Walk of a Thousand Lights, the midway anchoring the widely dispersed attractions and The Pike changed context from the original wooden boardwalk to the entire amusement zone. As it grew from a simple beach access made of planks to a midway of concessions, it included The Plunge bathhouse (pictured), Sea Side Studio souvenir photography, the Looff carousel, McGruder salt water taffy, pitch and skill games, pony rides, goat carts, fortune teller, weight guesser and a variety of dark and thrill rides, amusements and attractions large and small.

=== Rainbow Pier ===
In the early 1920s, the first Long Beach Municipal Auditorium was constructed on 20 acres (81,000 m^{2}) of tidal zone landfill located south of today's intersection of Ocean Boulevard and Long Beach Boulevard. After the construction of the auditorium, there were problems created by storms and coastal erosion in the area. In order to protect the auditorium from these problems, a horseshoe-shaped breakwater with a roadway along its crest was constructed around it, connecting Pine St. and the Long Beach Pier eastward to Linden St. Because its shape resembled a rainbow, it was named Rainbow Pier.

For a short time, the Long Beach Pier and Rainbow Pier both existed, sharing combined shore access at the Pine street incline.

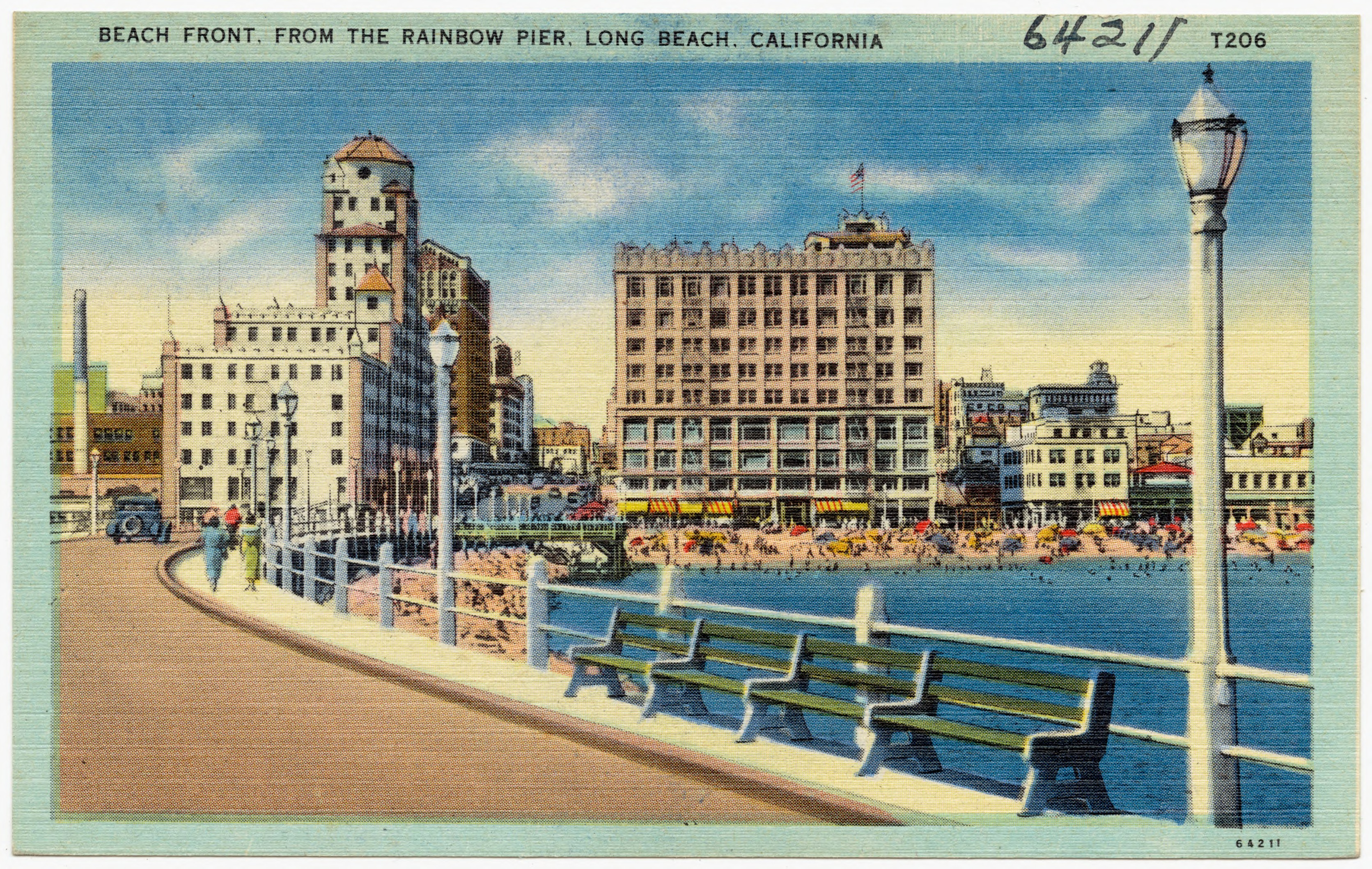
The Rainbow Pier and Ocean Center Building depicted on a postcard

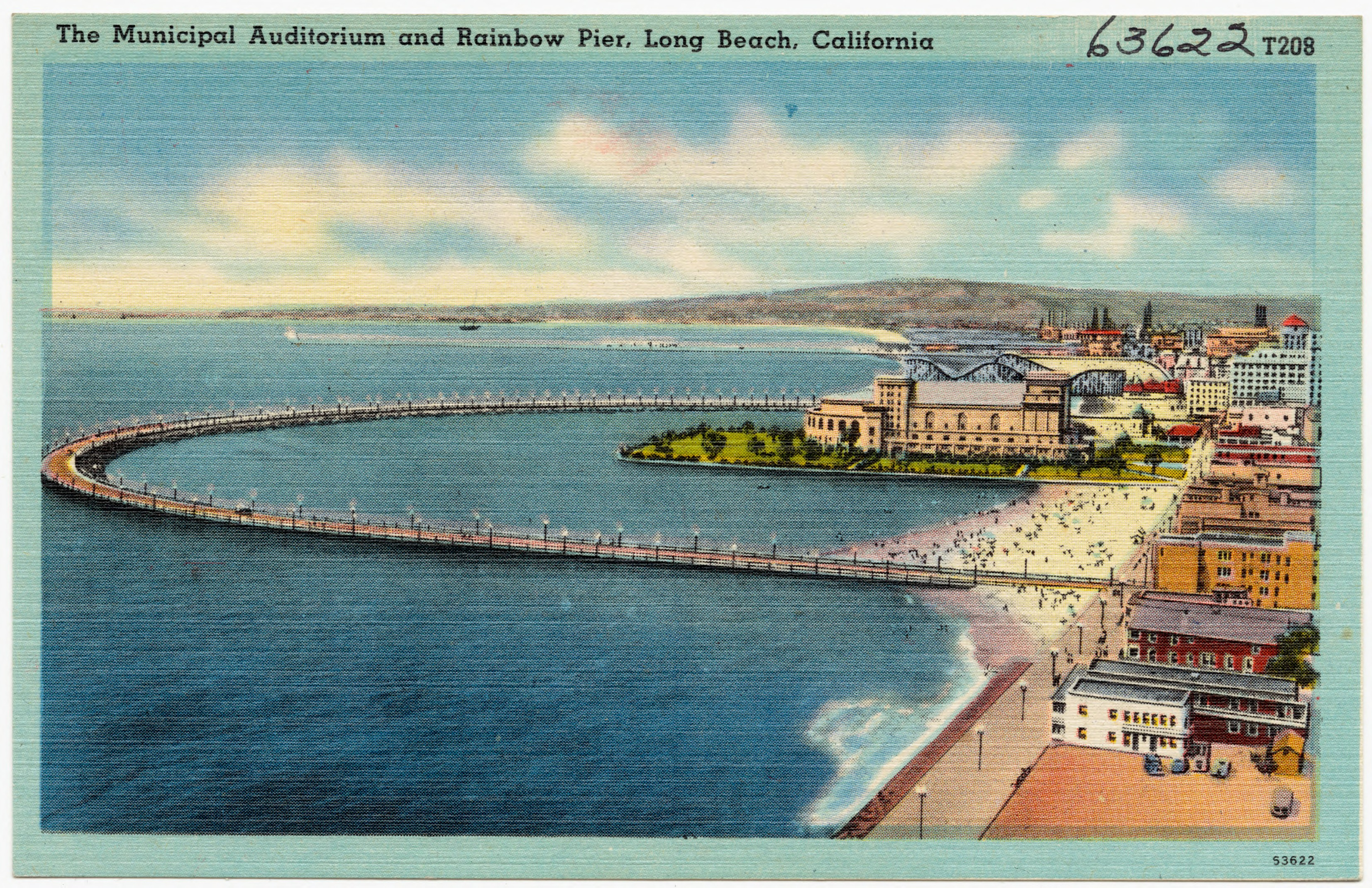
The municipal auditorium and Rainbow Pier

In the late 1940s, the City of Long Beach began filling in the water area enclosed by Rainbow Pier, creating Rainbow Lagoon and Wilmore Park, additional public trust lands upon which a larger, more modern auditorium was constructed. Filling of the shoreline area continued in the late 1950s and early 1960s with the Tidelands Filling Project.

=== Nu-Pike ===
In 1954 there were 218 amusements in the park, but later in the decade the zone began to face stiff competition from Knott's Berry Farm and then Disneyland (both less than 20 miles (32 km) away) and the rough, free-for-all reputation of The Pike may have discouraged some families from attending. In the 1950s, the area underwent another face-lift. Advertising with coupons appealing to families appeared in local newspapers. A Kiddieland collection of carnival flat rides, a "Bud" Hurlbut miniature train and petting zoo were installed on the silted-in new sand and public restrooms were built of concrete and cinder-block near a new picnic area, giving it a post-World War II modern look, and the park was renamed "Nu-Pike" as result of a write-in naming contest.

=== Queen's Park ===
In 1969, the name changed to Queen's Park, to coincide with the public opening of the historical ocean liner RMS Queen Mary, which the city had purchased as a combination tourist attraction and hotel. The park retained this name until closing and demolition (1979–1980). Most locals continued calling it The Pike.

=== Elmer McCurdy ===
In 1976, during the filming of The Six Million Dollar Man, someone spotted a mannequin in the corner on the ride Laff in the Dark. When he reached for the arm and it shockingly came off, it was then noticed that this was no dummy but a man. The man was later identified as Elmer McCurdy, an outlaw in the early 20th century who had been shot by police. McCurdy had no living relatives, so the undertaker took the body and asked the public to put a nickel in its mouth to see the corpse. A carnival runner turned up and claimed McCurdy was his long lost relative. It then made its way across carnivals and amusement parks until people forgot it was an actual mummy. The body was returned to Oklahoma, where it is buried.

== Attractions ==
=== Entertainment and shows ===
==== The Plunge ====
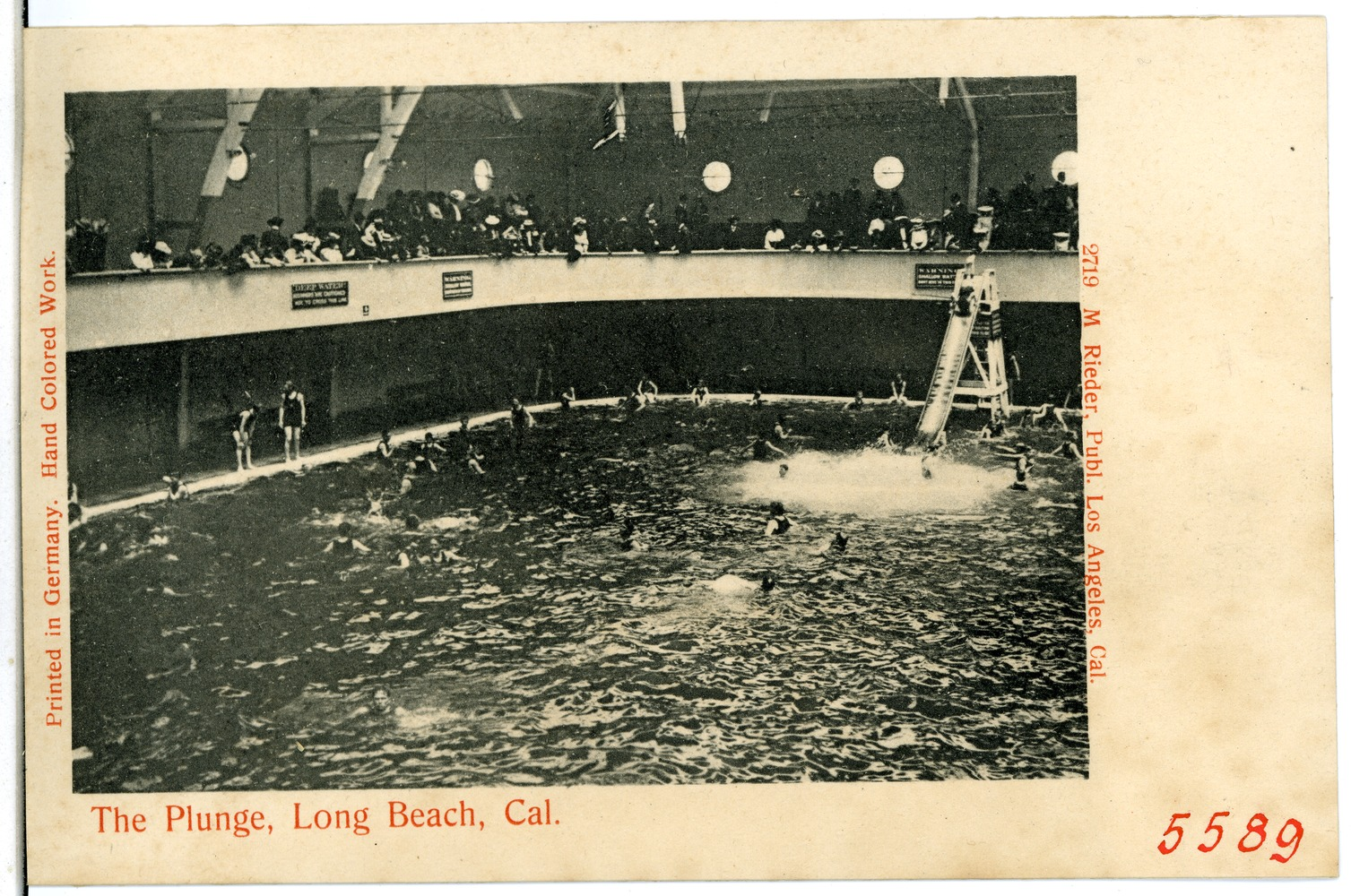
The Plunge, Long Beach, 1904

A grand bath-house was constructed at the shore and was scheduled to open on Independence Day, 1902, the day on which the Pacific Electric Railroad established service connecting communities along the line to offices and shopping in Downtown Los Angeles and bringing bathers and families south to shoreline recreation. Admission was charged for use of the clear, 'vacuumed', indoor freshwater pool, changing-rooms, and waterslide, all of which lay beyond a colonnade and sundeck. An interior balcony surrounding the pool and an outdoor one facing the beach offered people-watching on reclining lounges. The name was later changed to The Plunge. When it closed, it was converted to the Strand Theater.

==== Lido Ballroom ====
Until 1902, primary access to bathing was over unpaved roads by horse and buggy. A large livery and stables had been built to care for the animals of the bathers. Opening the Pacific Electric Big Red Car line to Long Beach diminished the importance of the livery, which closed as the automotive culture of Southern California developed. It was converted into a skating rink in 1906, then a dance hall by 1911, named The Majestic, featuring big bands. In the 1950s, it changed hands and was renamed The Lido Ballroom.

==== Live and motion picture theaters ====
Long Beach downtown featured several theaters, many of which were along the Walk of 1000 Lights. Starting east of Pine Street with access at Ocean Blvd. and The Pike was Lowes, known for first-run major releases. Several small shop-front theaters, exhibiting side-shows and independent films, came and went along the Walk of a Thousand Lights, but one big (and very tall) one, the Virginia, was later converted into the dark ride Whispering River. The Strand Theater offered a double feature, after being converted to a picture house when The Plunge closed.

A Pike attraction from 1909 to 1930 was the Wall of Death. Reckless Ross Millman, among America's first motorcycle daredevils, built a motordrome near the Jack Rabbit Racer.

==== Band shell ====
The Long Beach Municipal Band played most Sundays and holidays. The band was led by Herbert L. Clarke, who had been a member of John Philip Sousa's Band.

==== Amusements ====
Beginning at the entrance to the Walk of a Thousand Lights through the arcade archway entrance of the last surviving building associated with The Pike, the Ocean Center Building containing Hollywood on the Pike cabaret and an amusement arcade, one could stroll west along the midway past storefront games, such as ball-pitch and shooting galleries, as well as outdoor amusement machines such as fortune predicting weight-scales, and several large indoor collections of coin-operated Electro-mechanical amusements - pinball, skill-prize merchandisers, penny-pitch, nickelodeon viewers, love and strength testers, fortune tellers, the House of Mirrors and more. Among the most popular coin-operated amusement machines and devices were the redemption games which dispensed tickets, such as skee-ball.

==== Tattoo parlors ====
Proximity to the Long Beach Naval Shipyard, and its many sailors on extended leave during retrofitting, supported an ink economy because of the tradition of sailor tattoos. The dense collection of tattoo shops made next-door and cross-street neighbors of many minor and world-renowned artists, the most famous being Bert Grimm's tattoo shop and tattoo artist Rick Walters. Grimm's work contributed to the development and popularity of the American Traditional tattoo style. Kari Barba purchased Grimm's shop in 2003, and it operates under the name Outer Limits Tattoo. Started in 1927, this shop is the last remaining business from the original Pike, and the oldest continuously operating tattoo studio in the United States.

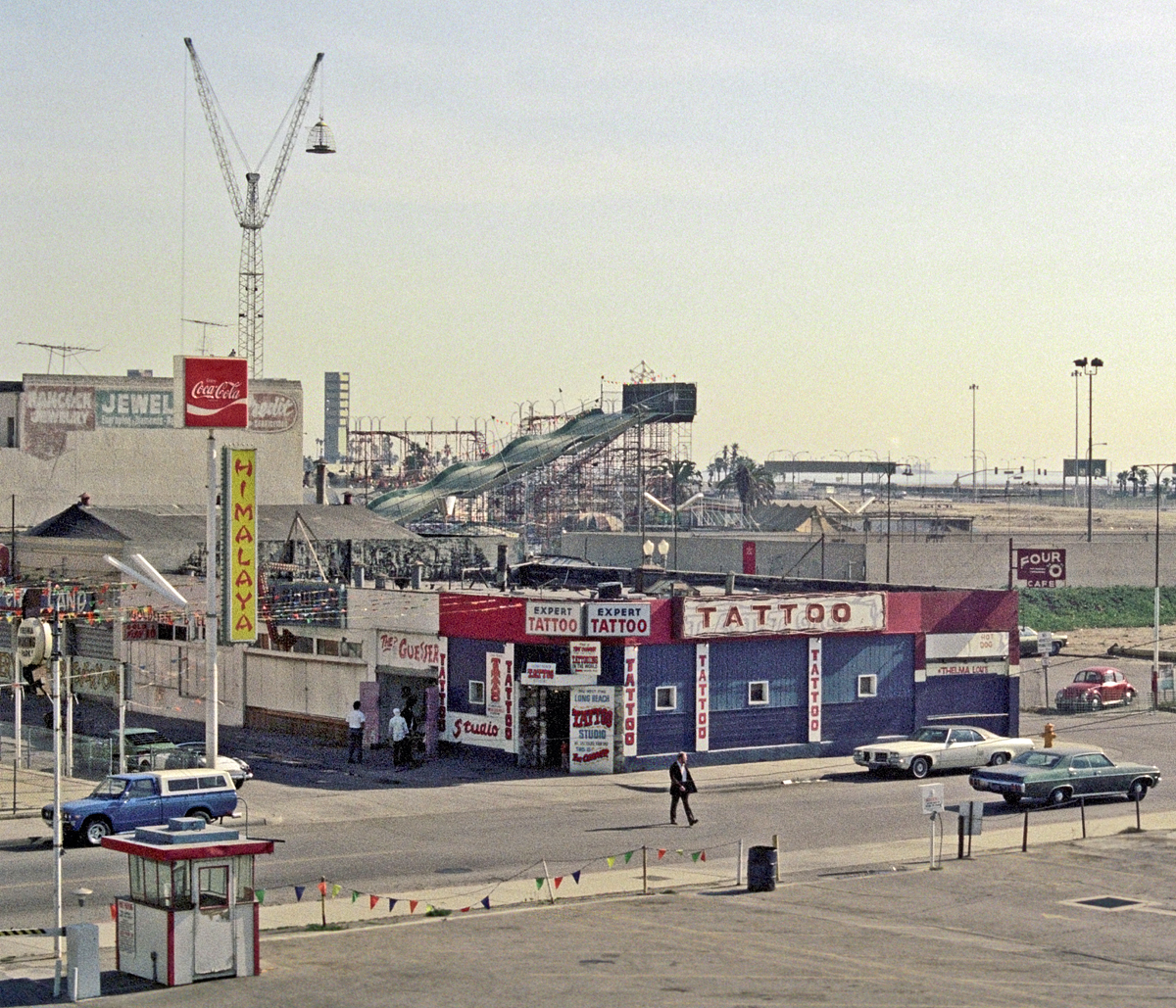
Tattoo shop at Queen's Park in 1976

==== Drinking and dining ====
From low-brow seedy dives like Rudy's (cocktails) and open front liquor stores to upscale cabarets featuring suggestive girly-shows like Hollywood on the Pike, many an opportunity existed for visiting sailors and locals to get drunk. A variety of eating establishments ranged from snack stands with corn-dogs, cotton candy, popcorn and hot nuts, or one could sit at soda-pop fountains and counter service restaurants like Lee's Barbecue with menus of chicken, ribs and fish meals, to a secluded booth with table service on linen.

=== Rides ===
- Laff in the Dark, Dark ride featuring three animated ballyhoo characters over the facade center, a Laffing Sal, Laffing Sam and Blackie the Barker, which was the first to deteriorate from weathering
- River Ride, ride in cars, spooks, converted to walk thru attraction, voodoo Hut, walk thru attraction
- Round Up, a Frank Hrubetz Co. 30 passenger tire drive single trailer model 18-18.5 RPM, 45° tilt, with chain restraints
- Rotor trailer model with previewing platform, sold to Magic Mountain as Spin-Out in 1979
- Alpine
- Wilde Maus aka Wild Bobs
- Loop-O-Plane by aka Hammer
- Roll-O-Plane
- Loop Trainer, aka Looper
- Scrambler
- Looff Hippodrome (1911–2005) with Carousel (1911–1943)
- Carousel (1944–1979), three course, open air
- Niagara Barrel (?-?), a wooden spiral slide (often mis-captioned as Bisby's Spiral Airship)
- Horse Race, a W.F. Mengels Galloping Carrousel, two course, rocking style carousel
- Space Capsule, observation crane, also known as Moon Rocket and Kiddie-land Hi-Ride
- Octopus.
- Crazie Maize, storefront house of mirrors
- Skooter, indoor bumper car
- Dodgem, Reverchon flat ride bumper car
- Fun House, storefront walk-through of challenging paths
- Tilt-A-Whirl by Sellner, later renamed Tilt
- Super Trooper, umbrella ride
- Sharks Alive, diving bell, submersible shark tank view
- Sky Ride, Watkins chairlift
- Snowmobile
- Kiddie Land - a collection of several carnival style children sized flat rides and truck rides, such as "hot walker" style miniature boats and sport vehicles
  - Giant Slide
  - Go Karts, Briggs & Stratton gasoline engine powered go-karts
  - Miniature Train (?-1979), a "Bud" Hurlbut steel coaches with gasoline-powered 'steam form' locomotive
  - Wheel of Fun, child Ferris wheel, 6 cages
- Sky Wheel, double Ferris wheel, built by Allan Herschell Company of New York, two wheels of eight cars each were connected with an armature, which allowed loading/unloading of the lower wheel while the upper one revolved, then top and bottom wheels would swap and when both were loaded and spinning, several turns of the armature provided serious thrills
- Davy Jones Locker- dark ride, ride on cars

==== The Looff Carousel Hippodrome ====
Charles I.D. Looff was one of the first great American carousel master carvers, having installed the first successful carousel at Coney Island, and developing amusements, carousels and roller coasters around the U.S.; examples of his carousels at Santa Monica Pier Looff Hippodrome (1922) and Santa Cruz Beach Boardwalk with brass ring feature (1911) still stand. In 1911, Charles I.D. Looff installed a carousel at the Pike in Long Beach, and he took up residence with his son, Arthur Looff and the rest of his family in the second story above the shops in the carousel hippodrome building that would later become home to Lite-a-Line. Buster Keaton filmed a scene from The High Sign (1921) at the Long Beach Pike carousel.

The horses of the original Long Beach Looff Carousel carved in 1911 were destroyed by fire in 1943. A new outdoor carousel was constructed nearby, and then the building was used as a gaming hall for Lite-a-Line bingo/pinball game and for many years was the last remaining building to survive the Pike demolition that began in 1979. The roof structure and cupola had been saved in the parking lot west of Pine Ave and the Ocean Center Building on Seaside Way was awaiting preservation by Mike Cincola, who married into the Looff family and has preserved much of the history of the Pike, some of which can be seen on display at his relocated "Lite-a-Line". The cupola was removed with its crest of popcorn lighted orb and saved intact by Cincola in 2010, but the roof was dismantled, it remains the last surviving original structure of The Pike.

=== Roller coasters ===
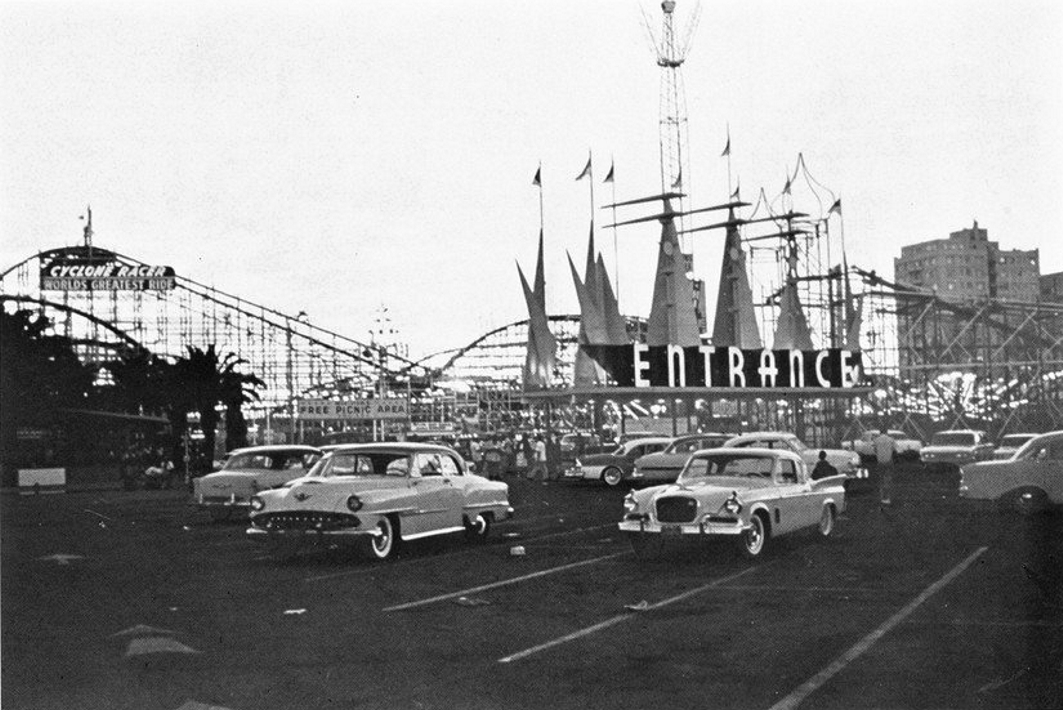
Entrance to The Pike in 1960 with the Cyclone Racer in the background

According to its misnamed Queens Pike entry in the Roller Coaster DataBase, The Pike had the following roller coasters:

- Bisby's Spiral Airship (steel) (1910-?)
- Comet Jr. (1949–1959)
- Cyclone (4 trailer Galaxi, steel) (9/1969–1979)
- Cyclone Racer wooden twin (5/30/1930-9/15/1968)
- Figure 8 Roller Coaster, wooden twin racer, replaced by larger Jack Rabbit Racer (6/1907-1914)
- Jack Rabbit Racer wooden twin racer, replaced by larger Cyclone Racer (5/1 1915–1930)
- Wilde Maus/Swiss Bobs (wood) (1959–1979)

==== Bisby’s Spiral Airship ====
Bisby's Spiral Airship, built in 1910, had cars that were suspended beneath a steel monorail track and could swing freely. The cars traveled up an inclined lift track to the top of an expanding, spiral cone-shaped, steel tower. As they began their spiral descent, centrifugal force caused them to swing outward before returning to the station. This is commonly acknowledged as the first suspended roller coaster type ride. This tall steel tower figures prominently in early postcards of Long Beach Pier (Pine Ave., later to join the west side of Rainbow Pier.)

Often confused – Many photos and postcards seen on the web are mis-captioned Bisby's Spiral Airship. If the structure has one long thin approach of steel to the top of a cylinder and camel-back return, that's Bisby's Spiral Airship. If the structure pictured is a thick wooden cone spiral slide, the entrance next-door east of Lee's Barbeque with a switchback stairway to a shack on top, the caption should read "Niagara Barrel".

==== Figure 8 ====
The Pike's first more traditional wooden roller coaster opened for business in June 1907. It was built by Fred Ingersoll and named the Figure 8 after the shape of the tracks. It was built on pilings that reached out over the water.

According to a 1966 editorial in the High Tide, the newspaper of Redondo Union High School, a rider met tragedy when he disobeyed a sign instructing riders not to stand up: "He apparently thought this would spoil his fun, so he proceeded to stand up. Unfortunately, his head was knocked off."

Figure 8 was closed in 1914 and demolished to clear the way for new development.

==== Jack Rabbit Racer ====
In 1914, the Pike Amusement Zone undertook several upgrades and a roller coaster named the Jack Rabbit Racer was opened in May 1915, becoming the second largest racing coaster in the country. It again was designed by Fred Ingersoll, with the help of John Miller. It was part of the Silver Spray Pier, which included several new rides and concessions. One could look down through the tracks and see the water. In the mid 1920s, several expansions were made to the area, and the Jack Rabbit Racer was remodeled, raising the ride's dips to a greater height and steepness. An elevated band shell was built into the coaster with track running right over it. Jack Rabbit Racer was removed in 1930.

==== Cyclone Racer ====
One of the best-known historic coasters, the Cyclone Racer was built in 1930 to replace the Jack Rabbit Racer. The Cyclone Racer was a dual-track (two trains could launch side by side at the same time), racing wooden roller coaster, the brain child of Fred Church and built by Harry Traver.

To increase thrill, the new coaster was built on pilings over the ocean, several hundred feet beyond the shore. Eventually the entire pier stood over sandy beach, not water, because of the sand deposition due to the slowing of water caused by the new harbor expansion and breakwater. Over 30 million riders rode on the Cyclone before it closed in 1968.

It was removed to clear space for a Shoreline Drive cloverleaf to the Magnolia Bridge in anticipation of the RMS Queen Mary's imminent arrival (a connecting road which was later demolished when found unneeded, proving the Cyclone Racer was removed unnecessarily.) The Cyclone Racer was the last remaining seaside dual-track roller coaster of its kind in the United States until it was disassembled and cataloged in September 1968 with the promise to Long Beach citizens that it would be rebuilt elsewhere.

Enthusiasts seeking to re-create this roller coaster have made a three-dimensional model and are looking to perhaps have it rebuilt in Southern California. The last remaining Cyclone Racer roller coaster car is located in the Pike Museum at 2500 Long Beach Blvd, Long Beach CA 90806. (Now closed.)

== In film and television ==
The Pike was frequently a location for filming television programs and movies.

- The Cook (1918)
- Sugar Daddies (1927) Laurel and Hardy see a girl about a funhouse.
- On The Loose (1931), Comedy short starring Thelma Todd and ZaSu Pitts. Scenes filmed at the Pike, standing in for Coney Island.
- Life Hesitates at 40 (1935) Watch for Carl 'Alfalfa' Switzer as the Boy at Soda Fountain.
- Strike Me Pink (1936) The Pike doubles for an amusement park beset with mobsters.
- I Wake Up Screaming (1941)
- Abbott and Costello in Hollywood (1945) Bud Abbott and Lou Costello Lou rides the famous Cyclone Racer Roller Coaster for the films comic climax.
- Fun on a Weekend (1947) a motion picture starring Eddie Bracken was filmed at the Pike with scenes of The Walk of 1000 lights, arcades, marquees and various rides. The background shots of the Villa Riviera (still standing) and Pacific Coast Club (torn down in the late 1980s) shows the beach area as well which, in the movie is portrayed as a seaside resort somewhere in Florida.
- He Ran All the Way (1951) In an attempt to blend into the crowd, The Plunge bathing procedure and interiors are documented in the first 20 minutes after a paranoid hoodlum kills a policeman in a bungled payroll robbery,
- Half Angel (1951)
- The Sniper (1952) The Pike substitutes for San Francisco's Playland as Eddie Miller (Arthur Franz) nails the shooting gallery, then walks past Laff-in-the-Dark to dunk a touting blonde.
- The Beast from 20,000 Fathoms (1953) featured The Cyclone Racer in the climax, when the stop-motion beast destroys a model of the coaster in split-screen with live action intercut with live action scenes from the coaster parking lot, entrance ramp and loading platform.
- Gorilla at Large (1954) the Pike doubles for the Garden of Evil.
- Jeanne Eagels (film) (1957) Waitress Jeanne Eagels (Kim Novak) joins the carnival in a desperate attempt to achieve fame in this biopic. The Pike stands in for Luna Park, Coney Island as Satori Park acquired by impresario Sal Satori (Jeff Chandler) in order to locate the hoochie dancer Eagels near New York City. Cyclone Racer becomes the dramatic focus of his enterprise introduced with "let's ride!" and while establishing park expansion/refurbishment. With her heart set on her name in lights filling a Broadway marquee, Eagels succeeds on stage and film after acting lessons lands her the lead understudy gig in Rain. The Strand Theatre (formerly The Plunge bathhouse) on The Pike (with the '1000-Lights' strings temporarily removed) is re-branded Satori Theatre for this film capturing both interior and exterior scenes of the stage and nearby shops of The Pike for her alcohol fueled decline.
- It's a Mad, Mad, Mad, Mad World (1963) the Pike can be seen in the background as the climactic car chase through downtown Long Beach turns south on Pine from Ocean Bl. past the Ocean Center Building then around Rainbow Pier.
- Roustabout (1964), the Sky Wheel double Ferris wheel is seen in Elvis Presley's motorcycle movie.
- The Incredibly Strange Creatures Who Stopped Living and Became Mixed-Up Zombies (1964) The Pike's best known appearance is in this cult film.
- Luv (1967) Jack Lemmon and Elaine May ride the Ferris Wheel
- The Girl Who Knew Too Much (1969), Towards the end of this film, an elevated view of the area is shown at night time. You can see the colors of the lights used on the rides and around the area. You can also hear the noise of the crowds, the rides and calliope music playing.
- The Stewardesses (1969), The Wilde Maus and several other Pike attractions & rides are seen.
- Mission: Impossible (1970) Episode "Flight". Jim Phelps boards the Space Capsule ride to obtain the mission briefing. Aerial views of much of the park can be seen in the background.
- Mannix (1970) Episode "Once Upon A Saturday". Mannix's client bought an amusement park and is being threatened. The scenes were filmed at this park, showing Sky Ride, the Carousel, and including a murder in the Skooter.
- Nightside (1973), The Pike was featured in this TV pilot.
- Cannon (1974) episode "The Avenger"
- Three the Hard Way (1974) blaxploitation film.
- Emergency! (1975) Queens Park Kiddie-Land is documented in the "Transition" (#4.15) episode. Roy, John and Gill Robinson, a new Paramedic, assist Chuck, a child suffering a nosebleed from the Go-Karts - Giant Slide and Wheel of Fun, a kiddie Ferris wheel, can be seen after Squad 51 parks in front of the Carousel and kiddie-go-round. Then Squad 51 returns to "50 Ocean, intersection of Pacific" to rescue a heart attack victim and others stranded aboard Space-Capsule/Hi-Ride by a jammed cable - scenes include views of Octopus, Rotor, Laff-in-the-Dark, Sky-Ride, Round-Up, the double Ferris wheel Sky Wheel, all in motion, and the halted Hi-Ride in white Queen's Park paint.
- Columbo (1975) episode "Identity Crisis" - The amusement park is featured in several scenes, which include activities at a shooting gallery and photo booth. Spies Nelson Brenner (Patrick McGoohan) and A. J. Henderson (Leslie Nielsen) meet at the Pike to discuss a covert operation. Later, Lt. Columbo (Peter Falk) visits the Pike to investigate Henderson's murder. The Long Beach Jail photo prop is visible in one scene.
- Starsky and Hutch (1975) episode "Texas Longhorn"
- Charlie's Angels (1976) episode "To Kill an Angel"
- S.W.A.T. (1975) Queens Park - Walk of 1000 Lights is documented in "Sole Survivor"(#1.12) episode. The team is called to respond to a sniper on the roof of Ocean and Magnolia. Scenes include views of the truck arriving south down the Cedar Ave. one-way incline from Ocean Bl. with city hall construction in Lincoln Park past Der-Wienerhausen and Penny Arcade to Bust-em-up in the Looff Hippodrome at 300 Walk of a Thousand Lights, Queenspitch, the carousel, kiddie-land rides and Giant Slide, views from the roof of the Skeeball Bowling to Shrimp Mile Long Dog 39¢ and West shopfronts on the North side of the Walk of 1000 Lights - Target Shooting Machine Guns, PIKE Room Seal Game and Penny Arcade, pedestrians scrambling east from Cat Rack (conversion from Shoot) to Rudy's, past the pink painted Target Shooting Machine Guns, Play Ball & Bust 'em Up Balloons. When the team enters 339 Windsor more views from the rooftops include Peppermint Pike Dancing, the newly constructed Shoreline Drive, Magnolia Bridge and RMS Queen Mary. Footage from this episode was recycled in "Deadly Weapons" (#2.19) creating continuity errors.
- The Six Million Dollar Man (1977) During the set-up to film the "Carnival of Spies" (#4.17) episode inside The Pike's Laff in the Dark in December 1976, when a stage hand moved the "hanging man" prop, a waxy finger broke off. The human bone inside revealed the mummy to be more than a mere prop - it was a real human corpse. Examination of the body by the Los Angeles County Medical Examiner's Office discovered that it was the arsenic embalmed human remains of Elmer McCurdy, an outlaw killed in 1911 after a botched train robbery.
- Visiting... with Huell Howser episode 917

== Demise of the amusement zone ==
In the 1970s, the city of Long Beach began redevelopment of the area, expanding into the Pacific Ocean, eliminating the recreational bathing beach by pouring landfill over it. The city had purchased the RMS Queen Mary in 1967 and permanently docked the ship in Long Beach across the mouth of the Los Angeles River from the shoreline area of the Nu-Pike where a new road circled the parking lot and Londontowne shopping-dining complex serviced by a London Double Deck omnibus to Downtown Long Beach. The Nu-Pike was renamed Queens Park when the Queen Mary opened to the public in 1971 as a self-guided maritime museum tour on the upper decks and engine room, a hotel utilizing the former luxury staterooms of the mid-decks and Jacques Cousteau's The Living Sea. Focus and attention was further diverted from Queens Park with Shoreline Village and Rainbow Harbor marina, serviced by Shoreline Drive, built to connect to the Long Beach Freeway on even more ocean landfill south of the Pike, as locals continued to call it. Planning for Shoreline Drive and a cloverleaf connection to the new Magnolia Bridge was the excuse to demolish the Cyclone Racer in 1968. Since 1975, the area has been a major portion of the Grand Prix of Long Beach route.

In 1979, the Pike amusement zone was officially closed and demolished. By the time the lease with the city ended, The Pike had fallen into disrepair and most of the businesses had already left. The City of Long Beach then removed the remaining structures. Various plans for development of the area took form over the next twenty years. In 1999, the California Coastal Commission approved a plan for the construction of The Pike at Rainbow Harbor commercial and entertainment complex in the downtown shoreline area. The name is only a nod in reference to the original amusement zone, bathing beach and boardwalk — the outdoor shopping mall bears no resemblance whatsoever to its historic predecessor.

== After the amusement zone ==
Concerns remained over the lack of a nearby recreational bathing beach, and solutions were sought for bringing back the excitement of the area’s heyday. With numerous debates over the area and its use as a portion of the track for the Long Beach Grand Prix, the main development of the area did not occur until the construction and 2003 opening of The Pike at Rainbow Harbor, an entertainment-retail center that pays homage to its past as an amusement zone.

The revised center spanned between the Long Beach Convention Center and the Aquarium of the Pacific. The tourist-oriented development had a large number of restaurants and a 14-theater megaplex Cinemark movie theater. There is a four-level, fee parking structure, metered street parking, a pedestrian overpass supporting teaser artwork resembling a steel roller coaster, an outdoor amphitheater, an antique Spillman carousel (1920) and a solar-powered Ferris wheel. However, the mostly entertainment-focused commercial concept was not ultimately successful. Borders, a main anchor of the center, closed in 2011. GameWorks shuttered and re-opened as Kitchen Den Bar, which also closed along with several other entertainment-oriented businesses.

In 2013, Restoration Hardware opened in the location of a former night club, hailed as a new retail anchor for the complex. Shortly after, it was announced that the center would be heavily revised - this time with a greater focus on retail shopping. Renamed The Pike Outlets, it includes several outlet stores such as Nike Factory Store, Forever 21, H&M, and Gap Outlet. The Cinemark movie theater and most of the restaurants remained open during the redevelopment, which was completed by 2015.
