= Black-and-gray =

Style of tattooing that uses only black ink in varying shades

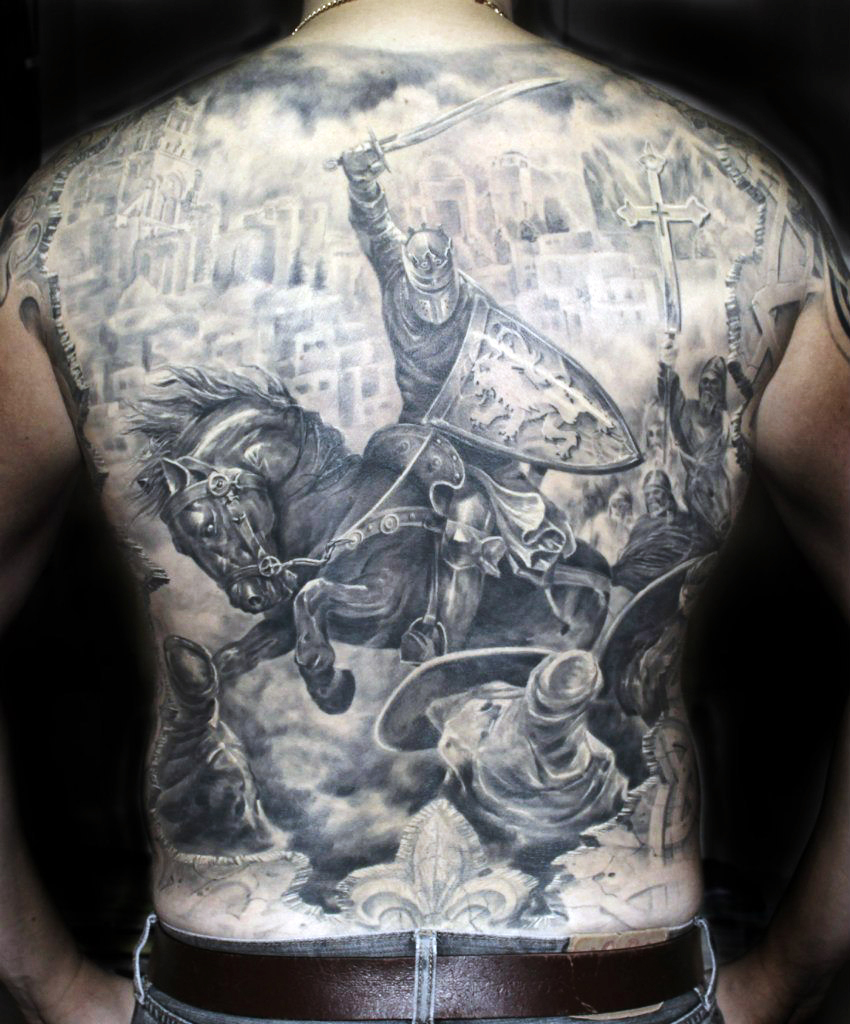
Black-and-gray tattoo illustrating the Crusades that encompasses the whole back (known as a "back piece"). The shading technique used encompasses different tones and line weights to create a sense of depth.

Black-and-gray (also black-and-grey, black and grey/gray) is a style of tattooing that uses black tattoo ink mixed with distilled water to create various tones in the skin. This tattooing style originated from prisons in the 1970s and 1980s and was later popularized in tattoo parlors.

== Origin ==
Black-and-gray is sometimes referred to as "jailhouse" or "joint style". It originated in prisons where inmates had limited access to materials: they resorted to using guitar strings for needles and cigarette ashes or pen ink to produce tattoos. Inmates constructed makeshift tattoo machines using small motors from tape players. Prisons prohibit inmates from tattooing, so these were done in secret. Jailhouse style developed in the Chicano and cholo culture in Los Angeles.

During the late 1970s and early 1980s, this style became popularized in tattoo parlors outside of prison and was renamed "black and gray". Tattoo artists Ed Hardy, Jack Rudy, Charlie Cartwright, and Freddy Negrete contributed to popularizing the style for a wider audience, including in a shop called Good Time Charlie's in East Los Angeles.

== Technique ==
Black-and-gray tattoo work is produced by diluting black ink with distilled water in varying proportions to create a "wash" that results in lighter shades. Gray shades can also be produced by mixing small amounts of black ink with white ink, which produces a thicker but brighter result and requires a slower application. Shading is an important component for these types of tattoos as they will fade over a period of years without strong black tones, which provide contrast and allows the tattoo to stand out. Subtle shading in black-and-gray requires a high level of skill from a tattoo artist.

== Common usage ==
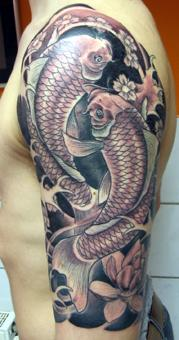
Irezumi tattoo depicting rising koi

Black-and-gray techniques can be used for a variety of tattoo designs and styles. Japanese irezumi, such as the rising koi, are traditionally done using black-and-gray, although colored irezumi sometimes use black-and-gray backgrounds in a manner similar to sumi-e brushwork. Classic Chicano tattoos—which include a broad range of imagery such as icons in Catholicism or the Mexican flag and partially originated from prison life—are also normally done in black-and-gray. Photo-realistic portraits are also commonly done in black-and-gray, and typically resist deterioration better than color portraits.

In some color tattoos, artists can use black-and-gray to provide a foundation for the subsequent shading using colors. The colored ink can be added directly above the black-and-gray portions of the tattoo.

== Examples ==
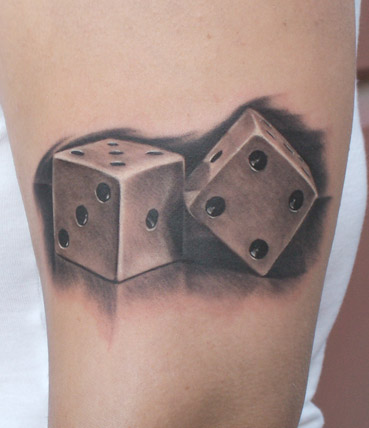

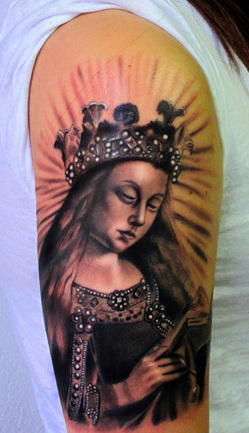

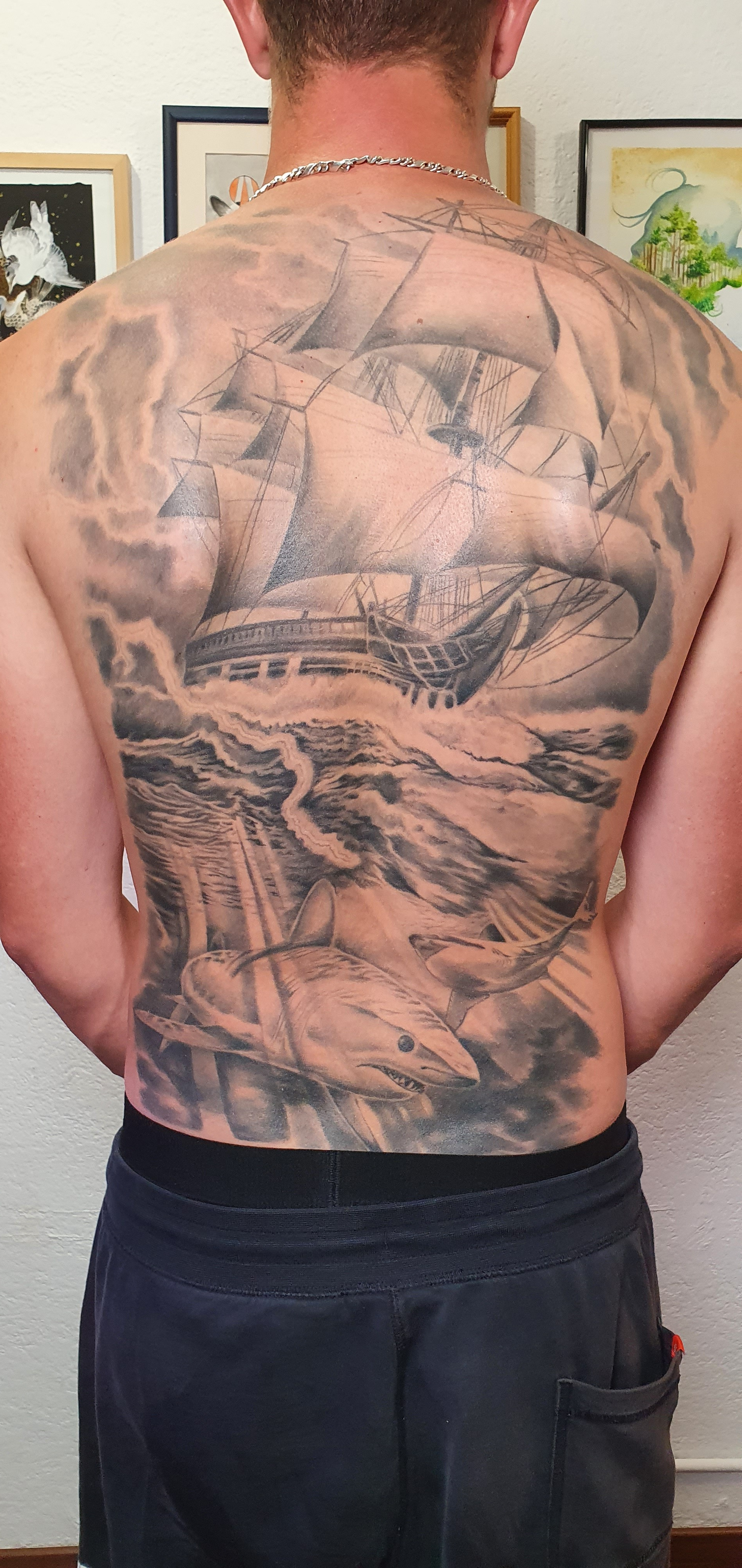

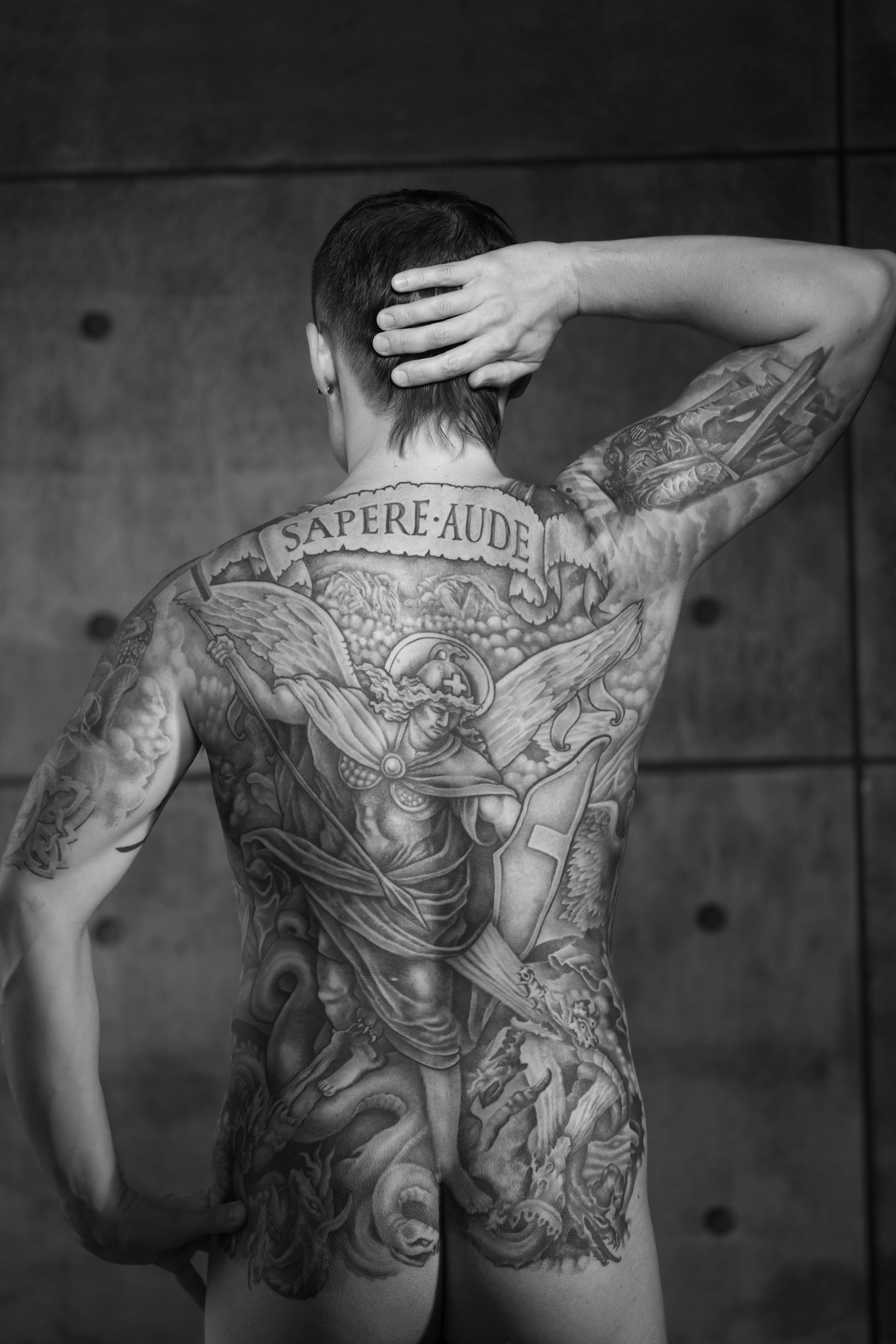
