= Color realism (art style) =

Fine art style of accurate color portrayal

Color realism is a fine art style where accurately portrayed colors create a sense of space and form. It employs a flattening of objects into areas of color, where the modulations occur more as a result of an object interacting with the color and light of its environment than the sculptural modeling of form or presentation of textural detail. The actual color of an object, or 'local color', is held secondary to how that color interacts with surrounding light sources that may alter the look of the original color. Warm light of the sun, cool light from the sky, and warm reflected light bouncing off other objects are all examples of how a local color may be affected by its location in space.

Earliest proponents of this style include the Dutch Master Johannes Vermeer and Hendrick Terbrugghen. Recent artists working with this style include the Boston School of painters, such as Edmund Tarbell and William McGregor Paxton. These artists combined vibrant Impressionist pastel colors with a more traditional palette, to create color-realist works that have a full range of dark to light values.

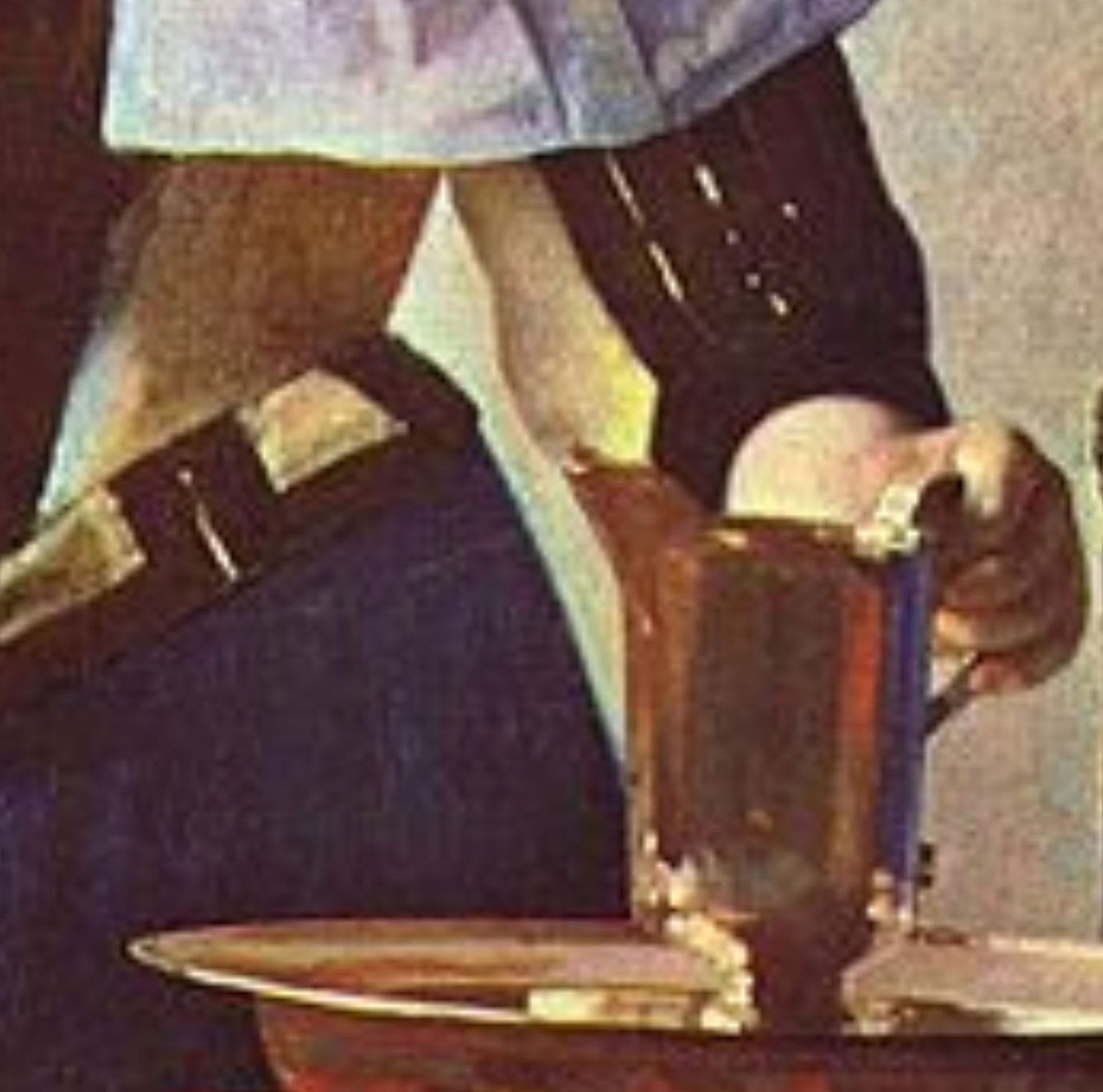
Detail of Woman with a Water Pitcher, by Johannes Vermeer, showing yellow bodice becoming a mixture of purple and orange-yellow in shadow between waist and arms from reflected light.

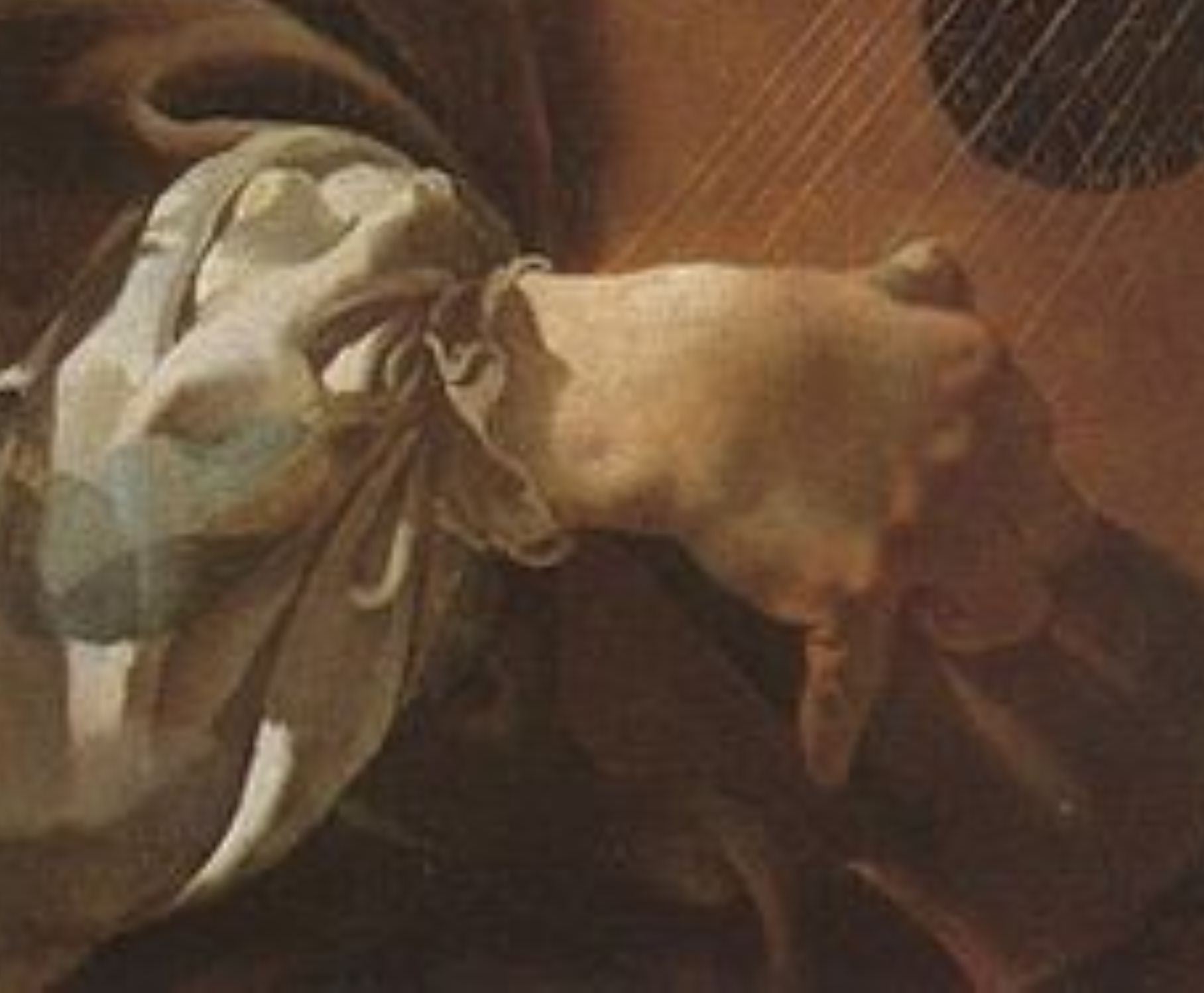
The Lute Player by Hendrick Terbrugghen, detail of hand and sleeve showing skin color and white shirt broken into planes of color from direct light and reflected light of room.

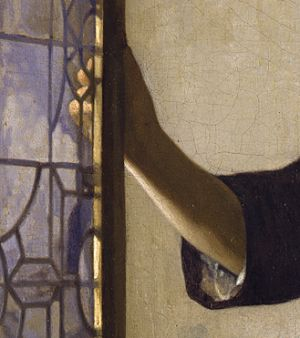
Detail of Woman with a Water Pitcher, by Johannes Vermeer, showing arm broken into two large areas of mixed color.
