= Boadway Bros. =

American department store chain

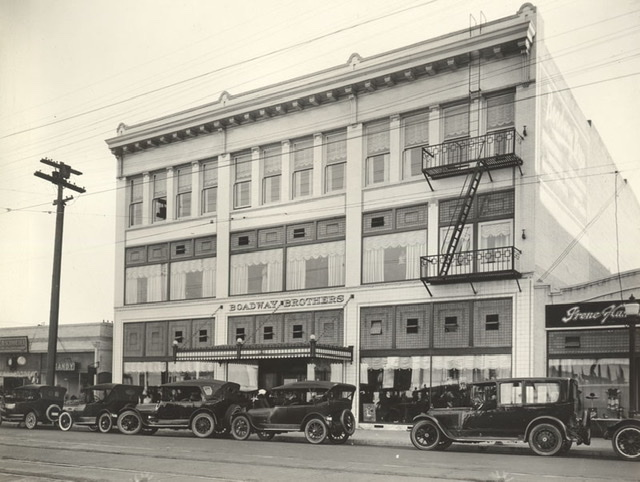
- Boadway Bros.' store at 268 E. Colorado Boulevard, Pasadena, California, 1918
- Founded: October 1912; 113 years ago
- Founders: Broadway Brothers

Boadway Bros. or Boadway's was a chain of upscale department stores in Southern California and New Mexico during the 1910s and 1920s, which started with a single store in Pasadena carrying furniture.

== First Pasadena store ==
In October 1912, the Boadway Brothers opened a new furniture store on Colorado Boulevard near Marengo. It consisted of three stories of 75 ft x 25 ft each, 5,625 square feet (522.6 m^{2}) total floor space, at a cost of $75,000.

Starting November 20, 1912, the space was used as a Christmas Shop, for which the stock was valued between $5000 and $6000, and the store was to have 130 saleswomen, 24 floorwalkers, 50 "cash girls" (cashiers) and 50 waitresses.

== Second Pasadena store ==
On October 1, 1917, Boadway's opened a new Pasadena store and expanded to dry goods, apparel, thus becoming a mainline department store. It added dry goods, silks, velvets and other "highly specialized lines of merchandise" until acquiring a stock worth $250,000, including selected lines of furniture. A broad, grand staircase to the mezzanine floor was added. The mezzanine was to have four “salons” for display and fitting, each of a different decorative theme. The second floor shoed furniture and the top floor, draperies and carpets. New display fixtures were of mahogany and high-quality plate glass. Stock included imported and domestic lingerie and imported Italian underwear. The store's crowning mark was having a corsetière on site, a woman specialized in fitting and manufacturing corsets to order, in addition to selling high-quality ready-made corsets.

== Planned Hollywood & Vine store ==
Dr. Edward O. Palmer was to build a six-story, 110,000-square-foot (10,000 m^{2}) store for Boadway's in Hollywood at Hollywood and Vine, and in 1922, stock was sold to finance its construction. After Boadway Bros. went out of business the next year, B. H. Dyas, a Downtown Los Angeles–based department store, opened in the building in 1927. The Broadway department store took over the building in 1931 and it continues to be known as the Broadway Hollywood Building.

== Store list ==
Boadway Bros. stores were acquired and liquidated as follows:

City	Location	Opened	Acquired business of	Sold to
Pasadena (first store)	Colorado Boulevard near Marengo	1912	(new)	
Pasadena (second store)	268 East Colorado Boulevard	1916	(new)	Tooker-Jordan
Albuquerque		1919	Golden Rule Dry Goods Co.	
Long Beach	411 Pine Avenue	1921	S. A. Schilling	Hugh A. Marti Co. (Marti's), early 1923
San Bernardino	E Street	1919	C. Cohn Dry Goods Co.	Markell's department store
Colton	125 Eighth Street	1918	Willets department store	Liquidates stock and closed store late 1918 NB: Willet’s re-opened a new store in Colton in later years.
San Diego	845 Fifth Avenue			
Hollywood	Hollywood & Vine now Broadway Hollywood Building		(new)	never opened as Boadway's; opened as B. H. Dyas in 1927
