= Broadway Department Store Building =

Broadway Department Store Building may refer to:

- Broadway Hollywood Building
- Broadway Department Store Downtown Los Angeles Building
