= Frederick Rice Dorn =

Los Angeles-based architect (d. 1934)

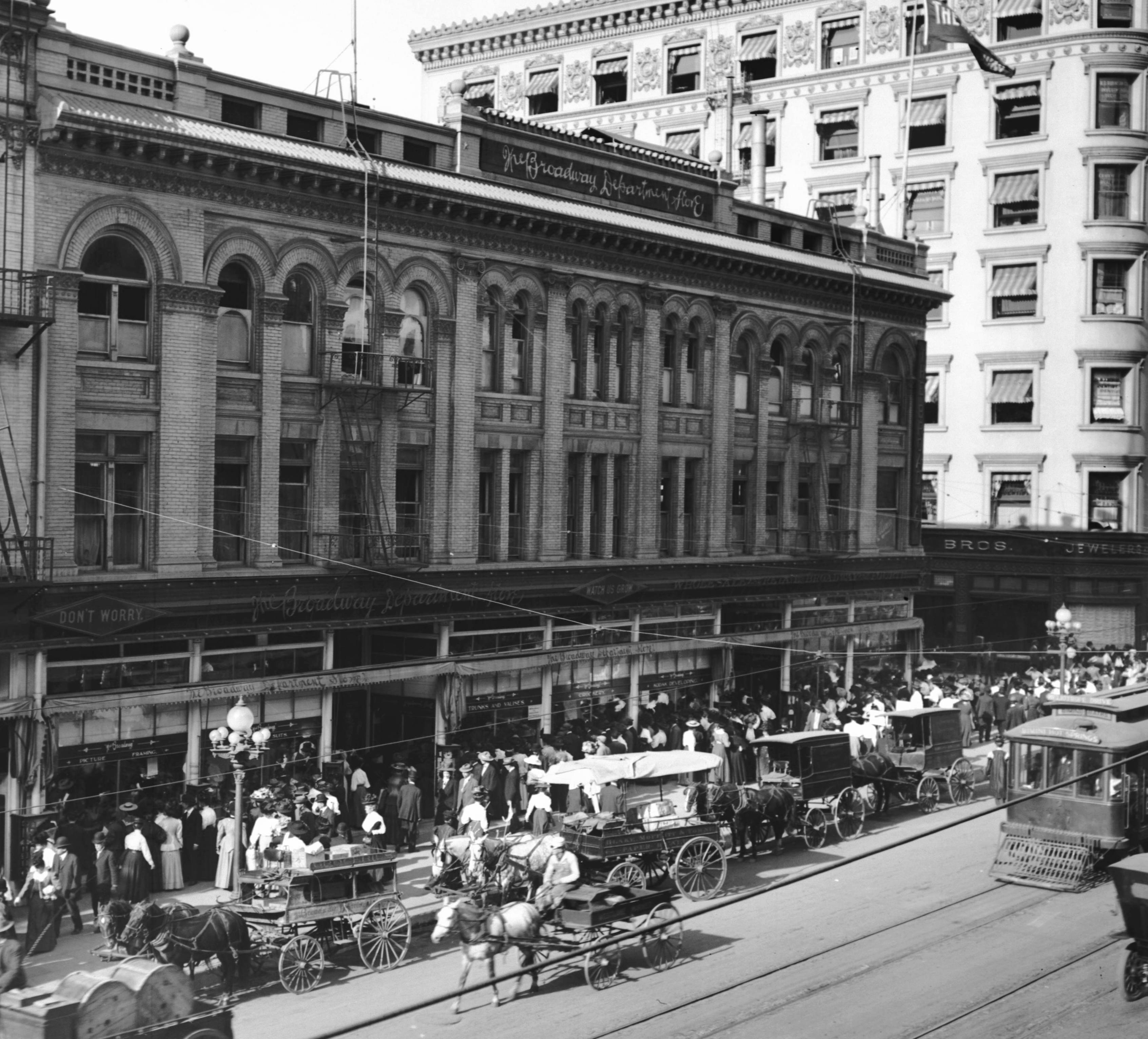
The Broadway's flagship in the Hallett & Pirtle Building around 1908–1910

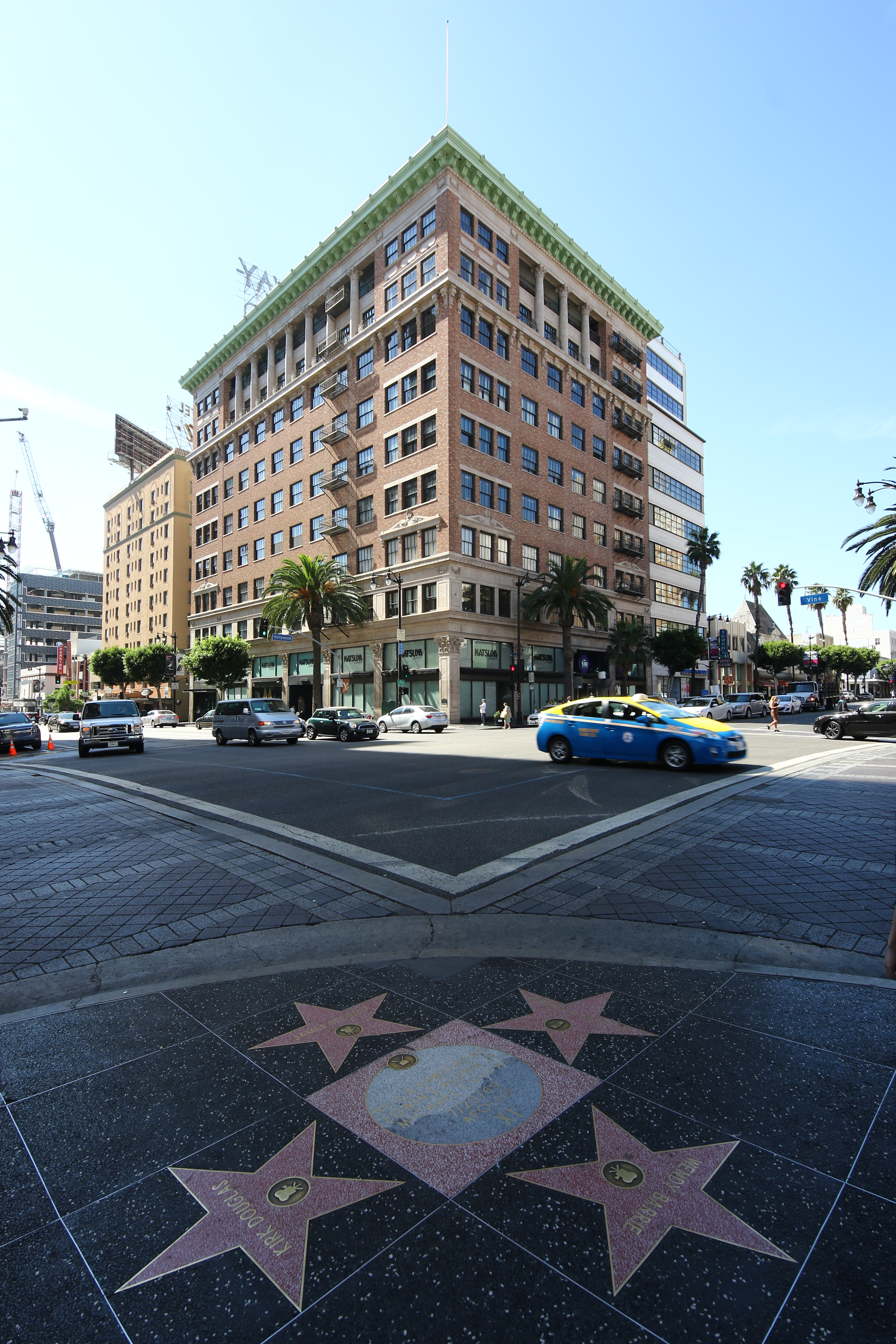
Broadway Hollywood Building seen from Hollywood and Vine, 2016

Frederick Rice Dorn (c. 1866 – May 19, 1934) was an American architect based in Los Angeles, California. He was involved in numerous commercial and residential projects in the city during the late 19th and early 20th centuries.

His best known as the architect of the Broadway Hollywood Building.

== Career ==
Dorn was a partner in the firm Gibson, Dorn & Slocum, Architects, operating in Los Angeles by 1888. Their office was located at 838 Temple Street. By 1903, Dorn had established his own practice, renting Room 232 in the Douglas Building in Los Angeles.

A profile of Dorn in the Los Angeles Herald in 1895 highlighted some of his notable early projects, including a three-story brick lodging house for A.F.M. Strong at Fourth and Hill streets, a three-story commercial block for Marsh & Gage on Third Street, and a family hotel for P.A. Gama at Seventh and Olive Streets. He also designed numerous residences, including Gray Gables at Seventh and Hill, and the residence of Rev. A.C. Smithers at 1147 S. Hope Street.

== Larger works ==
Dorn's works include:

- Hallett & Pirtle Building, 1895, southwest corner of Fourth Street and Broadway, Downtown Los Angeles. Would become the original home of The Broadway department store, which developed into a regional chain.
- Marsh-Strong building, 1913, southwest corner of Ninth, Main, and Spring streets, Downtown Los Angeles.
- B. H. Dyas department store, 1927 at the corner of Hollywood and Vine streets in Hollywood, later becoming The Broadway Hollywood. The building is sometimes attributed only to Parkinson & Parkinson who executed a later remodel and addition.

== Personal life ==
Dorn was born in Port Henry, New York, and moved to Los Angeles in the mid-1880s with his family. His father, Rufus H. Dorn, was also an architect. Frederick lived at various addresses in Los Angeles, including 838 Temple Street and 414 East 27th Street. He died in Redlands, California in 1934.

Dorn married Alice Dunford Austermell in 1894, and they had three children.
