= Carl Laemmle =

German-American film producer (1867–1939)

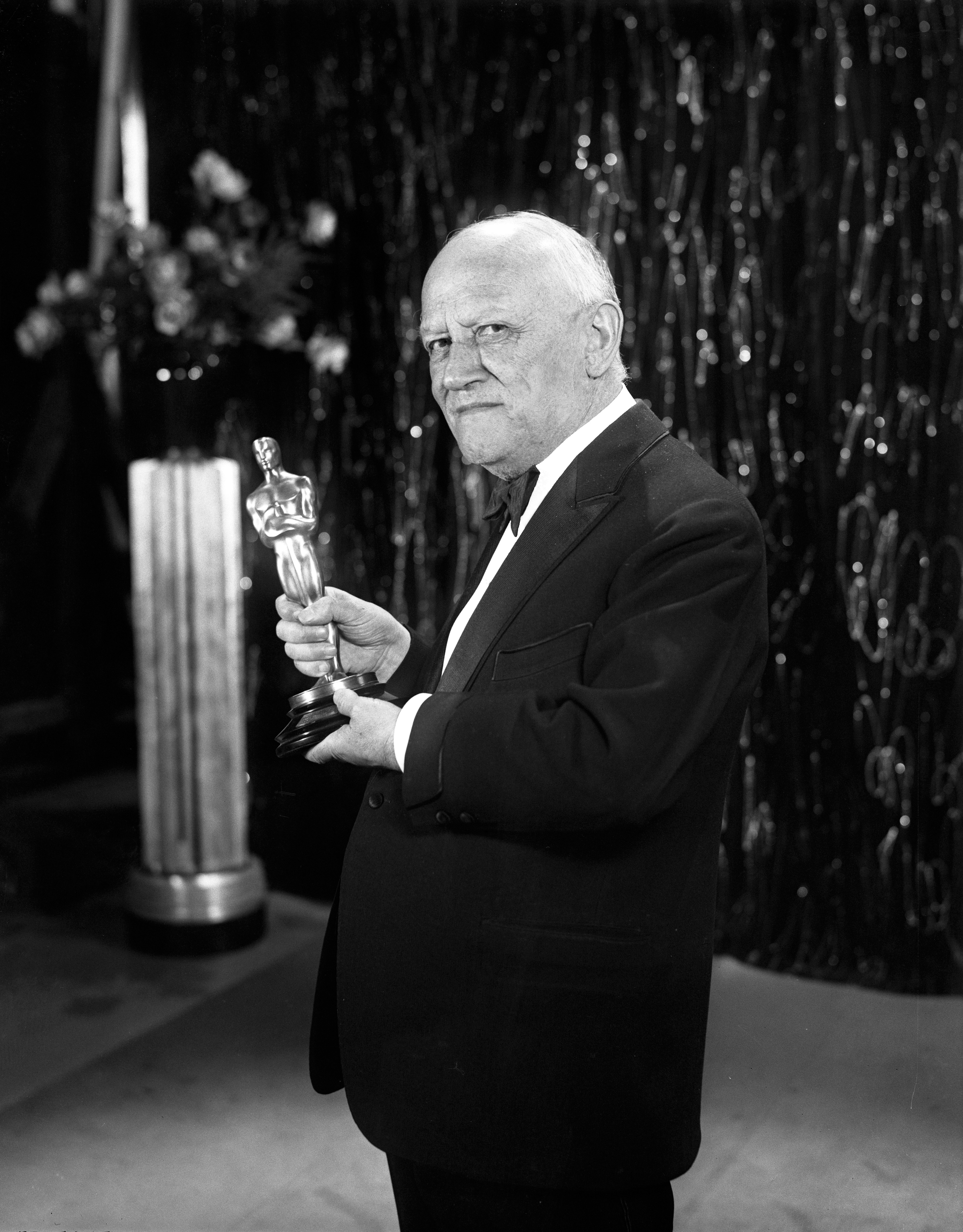
- Laemmle at the 3rd Academy Awards, 1930
- Born: Karl Lämmle; January 17, 1867; Laupheim, Württemberg
- Died: September 24, 1939 (aged 72); Los Angeles, California, U.S.
- Resting place: Home of Peace Cemetery, Los Angeles, California, U.S.
- Years active: 1909–1939
- Spouse: Recha Stern
- Children: 2, including Carl Laemmle Jr.
- Family: Stanley Bergerman (son-in-law); Carla Laemmle (niece)

Signature
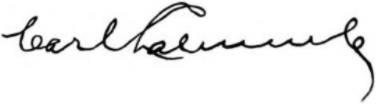

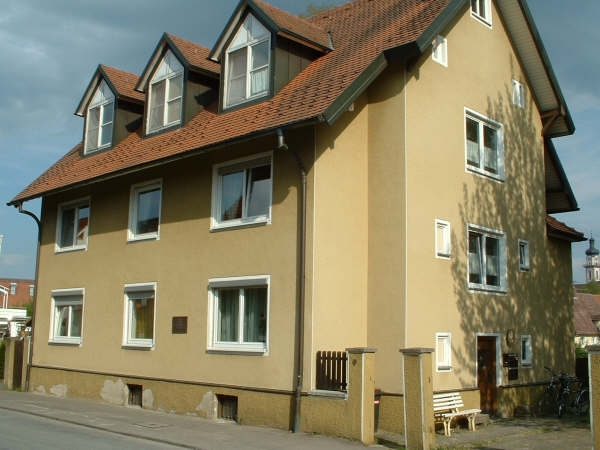
Birthplace of Carl Laemmle in Laupheim

Carl Laemmle (January 17, 1867 – September 24, 1939) was a German-American film producer, distributor, and studio executive who co-founded Universal Pictures in 1912. In 1915, he opened the company's production studios in California.

Born in Laupheim, in what is now Germany, Laemmle immigrated to the United States in 1884. He entered the motion picture business in Chicago in 1906, opening a nickelodeon before expanding into film distribution. In 1909, he founded the Independent Moving Pictures Company (IMP), which competed with the Motion Picture Patents Company. In 1912, he merged his company with several smaller film companies to form Universal.

== Early life and education ==
Karl Lämmle was born in 1867 to Julius Baruch Lämmle and Rebekka Lämmle, a Jewish couple in the Radstrasse, a street in the Jewish quarter of Laupheim, in the Kingdom of Württemberg. His father was a cattle merchant, also involved in land transactions. The family struggled financially and lived in poverty: Of his 11 siblings only three reached adulthood. He was one of the youngest children, and close to his mother, who enrolled him in a Jewish school. When he was 13, she arranged a three-year apprenticeship for him in Ichenhausen, a nearby village, where he learned accounting and sales, and worked to support his family.

== Career ==
After his mother died in 1883, Laemmle decided to emigrate to the US for a better life, also following his thirteen-year-older brother Joseph. For his 17th birthday, his father had given him the tickets for an Atlantic crossing on the steamboat SS Neckar plus fifty dollars. He left Bremerhaven on January 28, 1884, and arrived in New York on February 14, 1884. He settled in Chicago. Here he lived for about twenty years as a bookkeeper and office manager. In 1889, he became a naturalized American citizen. Laemmle worked a variety of jobs, but by 1894 he was the bookkeeper of the Continental Clothing Company in Oshkosh, Wisconsin, where he introduced a bolder advertising style.

In 1906, at the age of 39, Laemmle quit his job. He initially wanted to open a network of cheap retail stores, but changed his mind after entering a nickelodeon. He started one of the first motion picture theaters in Chicago, The White Front on Milwaukee Avenue, and quickly branched out into film exchange services. He challenged Thomas Edison's monopoly on moving pictures, the Motion Picture Patents Company, under the Sherman Anti-Trust Act of 1890. As part of his offensive against Edison's company, Laemmle began advertising individual "stars," such as Mary Pickford and Florence Lawrence, thus increasing their individual earning power, and thus their willingness to side with the "Independents."

After moving to New York, Carl Laemmle became involved in producing movies, forming Independent Moving Pictures (IMP); the city was the site of many new movie-related businesses. On April 30, 1912, in New York, Laemmle brought together Pat Powers of Powers Motion Picture Company, Mark Dintenfass of Champion Film Company, William Swanson of Rex Motion Picture Company, David Horsley of Nestor Film Company, as well as Charles Baumann and Adam Kessel of the New York Motion Picture Company, to merge their companies with IMP as the "Universal Film Manufacturing Company", with Laemmle assuming the role of president. They founded the Company with studios in Fort Lee, New Jersey, where at the beginning of the 20th century many early film studios in America's first motion picture industry were based.

On March 15, 1915, Laemmle opened the world's largest motion picture production facility, Universal Studios Hollywood, on a 230-acre (0.9-km^{2}) converted farm in the San Fernando Valley, just over the Cahuenga Pass from Hollywood.

Universal maintained two East Coast offices: The first was located at 1600 Broadway, New York City. This building, initially known as the Studebaker Building, was razed around 2004 or 2005. The second location to house Universal's executive offices was at 730 Fifth Avenue, New York City. Many years later, 445 Park Avenue was the location of Universal's executive offices. In 1916, Laemmle sponsored the $3,000 three-foot-tall solid silver Universal Trophy for the winner of the annual Universal race at the Uniontown Speedway board track in southwestern Pennsylvania. Universal filmed each race which ran from 1916 to 1922.

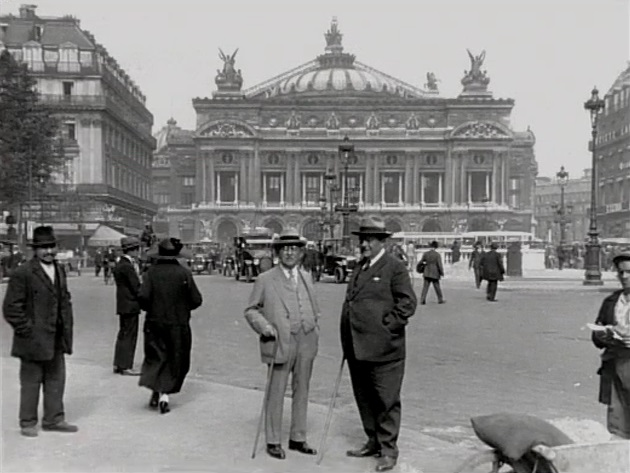
Laemmle with Gaston Leroux at the Palais Garnier

In 1932, Laemmle opened the Laemmle Building on Hollywood and Vine. Originally planned as a 900-seat theater and office tower, the final construction was a one-story restaurant, the original plans thwarted by the Great Depression.

In 1936, Laemmle sponsored silent-era filmmaker James Cruze, giving him carte blanche to direct a large-scale western, Sutter's Gold. Cruze spent too lavishly and the resulting film was a notorious box office bomb. A consortium of angry investors undertook a hostile takeover of the company, ousting both studio founder Laemmle and his son Carl, Jr. The senior Laemmle briefly resumed distribution in partnership with Michael Mindlin, specializing in foreign films as CL Imports, in the mid-1930s, but for the most part remained in secluded retirement until his death in 1939. Laemmle's last act was writing a letter to Mindlin, commenting on his own health: "I am feeling pretty good these days." Mindlin received the letter after Laemmle's death.

== Personal life ==
In 1898, Laemmle married Recha Stern, the niece of Sam Stern, his employer at the Continental Clothing Company. Together, they had a daughter named Rosabelle (born 1903) and a son named Julius (born 1908). Rosabelle later married Stanley Bergerman, while Julius became known as Carl Laemmle Jr. On January 13, 1919, at the age of 43, Recha died from pneumonia caused by the Spanish flu.

After moving to California, Laemmle purchased the former home of film pioneer Thomas Ince on Benedict Canyon Drive in Beverly Hills, which was razed in the early 1940s; he also maintained a large apartment for himself and his two children at 465 West End Avenue in New York City.

Asked how to pronounce his surname, Laemmle told The Literary Digest in 1936, "The name means 'little lamb' and is pronounced as if it were spelled 'lem-lee'."

Laemmle's relatives in the film industry included his cousins Max Laemmle, Kurt Laemmle, and William Wyler; his nephews Ernst Laemmle and Edward Laemmle; his niece Carla Laemmle; and his brothers-in-law Isadore Bernstein, Joseph Stern, and Abe Stern.

Poet Ogden Nash observed the following about Laemmle's habit of giving his son and nephews top executive positions in his studios:

Uncle Carl Laemmle
Has a very large faemmle.

Laemmle died from cardiovascular disease on September 24, 1939, in Beverly Hills, California, at the age of 72. Laemmle was entombed in the Chapel Mausoleum at Home of Peace Cemetery.

== Legacy ==
Laemmle, although having made hundreds of films in his active years as a producer (1909–1934), is remembered for The Hunchback of Notre Dame (1923), The Phantom of The Opera (1925), both with Lon Chaney Sr. in the title role, and The Man Who Laughs (1928) and most of the early sound horror films, such as Dracula (1931) and Frankenstein (1931), with his son, Carl Jr.

Laemmle remained connected to his home town of Laupheim throughout his life, providing financial support to it. In the 1930s he sponsored hundreds of Jews from Laupheim and Württemberg to emigrate from Nazi Germany to the United States, paying both emigration and immigration fees, thus saving them from the Holocaust. To ensure and facilitate their immigration, Laemmle contacted American authorities, members of the House of Representatives and Secretary of State Cordell Hull. He also intervened to try to secure entry for the refugees on board the SS St. Louis, who were ultimately sent back from Havana to Europe in 1939, where many were murdered in the Holocaust.

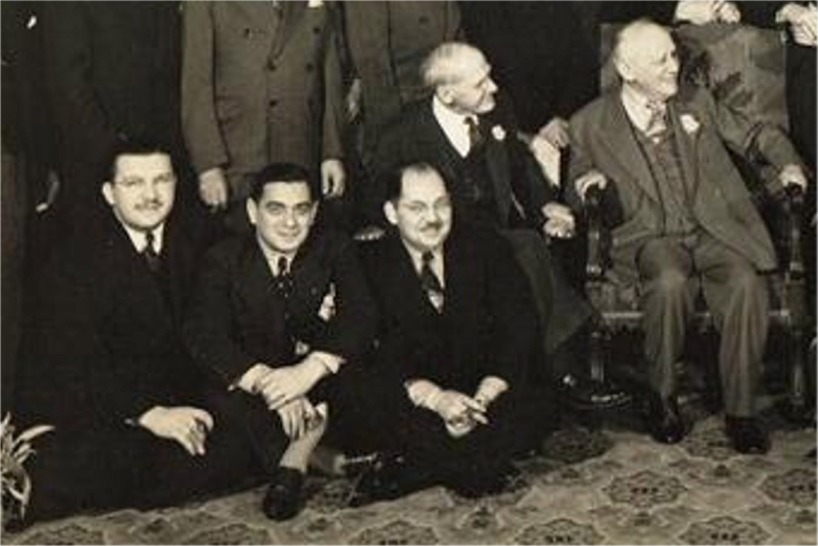
Carl Laemmle (seated far right) and Irving Leroy Ress (sitting, far left) at Laemmle's 70th birthday celebration (1937)

== Representation in other media ==
- as a main character in the novel The Dream Merchants (1949) by Harold Robbins, a former Universal Studios employee.
- as a historical character in the TV series The Adventures of Young Indiana Jones (1992).
- as a main character in the novel Sweet Memories (2012), David Menefee.
- German actor Berthold Biesinger plays Carl Laemmle in the theatre play "Marlene in Hollywood" by Hannes Stöhr. “Marlene in Hollywood” premiered in May 2023 at the Theater Lindenhof in Germany, deals with Marlene Dietrich and her time in Hollywood. Carl Laemmle is extensively honored on stage as the inventor of Hollywood. Erich Maria Remarque (novel author of "All quiet on the western front") introduces Carl Laemmle. The play was supported by the Deutsche Kinemathek.
- Played by actor David Davino in the docudrama Titans: The Rise of Hollywood produced by Curiosity Stream, which was picked up by Netflix (2022).

== See also ==
- History of the Jews in Laupheim
- Laemmle Theatres
