= Laemmle Building =

Former historic building in Los Angeles, California, U.S.

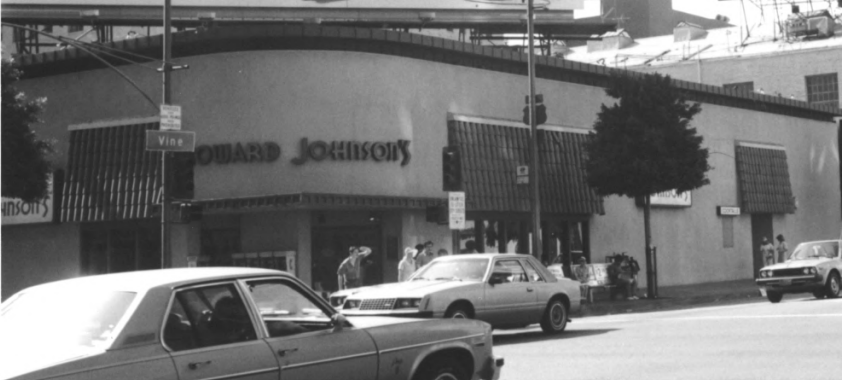
- The building in 1984
- Interactive map of the Laemmle Building area

General information
- Location: 6301 W. Hollywood Boulevard, Hollywood, California
- Coordinates: 34.102°N 118.327°W
- Named for: Carl Laemmle
- Year built: 1932
- Renovated: 1940, 1955
- Demolished: 2008

Technical details
- Floor count: 1

Design and construction
- Architects: Richard Neutra; Wayne McAllister; S. Charles Lee

Laemmle Building (/ˈlɛmli/ LEM-lee) was a historic building located at 6301 W. Hollywood Boulevard, on the corner of Hollywood and Vine, in Hollywood, California. Built in 1932, it was destroyed in a fire in 2008.

== History ==
In 1925, Carl Laemmle purchased land on the northwest corner of Hollywood and Vine from George Hoover for $350,000 ($6.43 million in 2025). Laemmle, then president of Universal Pictures Corporation, owned a successful movie studio in the San Fernando Valley and planned to build a 900-seat theatre and office tower on this property, but the Great Depression thwarted his plan. Instead, he developed Laemmle Building, designed by Richard Neutra and opened in 1932.

Laemmle Building's first tenant was the CoCo Tree Café, and in 1940 restaurateur Sidney Hoedemaker of the Pig 'n Whistle - Melody Lane chain transformed the building into a Melody Lane Restaurant. Architects Wayne McAllister and S. Charles Lee led the transformation. In 1949, Hoedemaker founded Hody's Restaurant and in 1955, Hody's Restaurant signed a twenty-year lease for Laemmle Building, at which point the building was remodeled again.

In 1971, a Howard Johnson's Coffee Shop moved into the building, where they would remain until the mid-1980s, and in 1985, the Hollywood Boulevard Commercial and Entertainment District was added to the National Register of Historic Places, with Laemmle Building listed in the district. The listing noted that the building was heavily remodeled and remained no integrity; therefore, it was not listed as a contributing property in the district.

After Howard Johnson's Coffee Shop vacated the building, the building was occupied by a slew of struggling retail and nightclubs, including Premiere, Jack's Sugar Shack, the Deep, and finally the Basque nightclub. Also during this time, Hollywood Brown Derby briefly occupied the building, after their previous location, a half-block away, was destroyed in a fire.

In 2008, the building, occupied by the Basque nightclub, was destroyed in a fire. The location has since become a parking lot.

== Architecture and design ==
Laemmle Building was a one-story stucco structure and featured a red tile roof.
