= Destination Victoria Station =

Studio album by Johnny Cash
- Released: 1975
- Genre: Country
- Label: Columbia

Johnny Cash chronology
Five Feet High and Rising (1974)	Destination Victoria Station (1975)	Greatest Hits, Vol. 3 (1978)

Professional ratings
Review scores
Source	Rating
AllMusic	2/5 stars
The Encyclopedia of Popular Music	2/5 stars

Destination Victoria Station is a 1975 album by country music singer Johnny Cash. It was offered as a Columbia Special Product and could only be bought at Victoria Station restaurants. Cash re-recorded several of his old train songs for this album, including "Waitin' for a Train", "Wreck of the Ol' 97" and "John Henry", and one new song, "Destination Victoria Station". In addition to re-recording songs, Cash also re-recorded his vocals on "Wabash Cannonball" and "Orange Blossom Special", both retaining their original 1960s backing tracks. The title track had previously been featured on a live album, but the recording for this release was a new studio performance. The album also included several tracks lifted from previously released albums. To date this album has never been released on CD and due to its heavy reliance on previously released recordings was omitted from the otherwise-comprehensive 2012 box set Johnny Cash: The Complete Columbia Album Collection.

== Track listing ==
Side one
No.	Title	Writer(s)	Length
1.	"Casey Jones" (from Blood, Sweat and Tears)	Trad. arr. Johnny Cash	3:01
2.	"Hey Porter"	Johnny Cash	2:41
3.	"John Henry" (previously recorded in a longer version with different lyrics as "The Legend of John Henry's Hammer" for Blood, Sweat and Tears)	Traditional	2:51
4.	"Wabash Cannonball" (new vocal; original instrumental backing from Happiness is You)	A.P. Carter	2:39
5.	"City of New Orleans" (from Johnny Cash and His Woman)	Steve Goodman	3:38
6.	"Folsom Prison Blues" (from At Folsom Prison)	Johnny Cash	2:45

Side two
No.	Title	Writer(s)	Length
1.	"Crystal Chandeliers and Burgundy" (from The Junkie and the Juicehead Minus Me)	Jack Wesley Routh	2:27
2.	"Wreck of the Old 97"	Trad. arr. Norman Blake, Johnny Cash, Bob Johnson	1:49
3.	"Waiting for a Train"	Jimmie Rodgers	1:46
4.	"Orange Blossom Special" (new vocal; original instrumental backing from Orange Blossom Special)	Ervin T. Rouse	3:05
5.	"Texas 1947" (from Look at Them Beans)	Guy Clark	3:16
6.	"Destination Victoria Station"	Johnny Cash	2:20

== See also ==
- List of train songs
