= Miceli's =

Hollywood restaurant since 1949

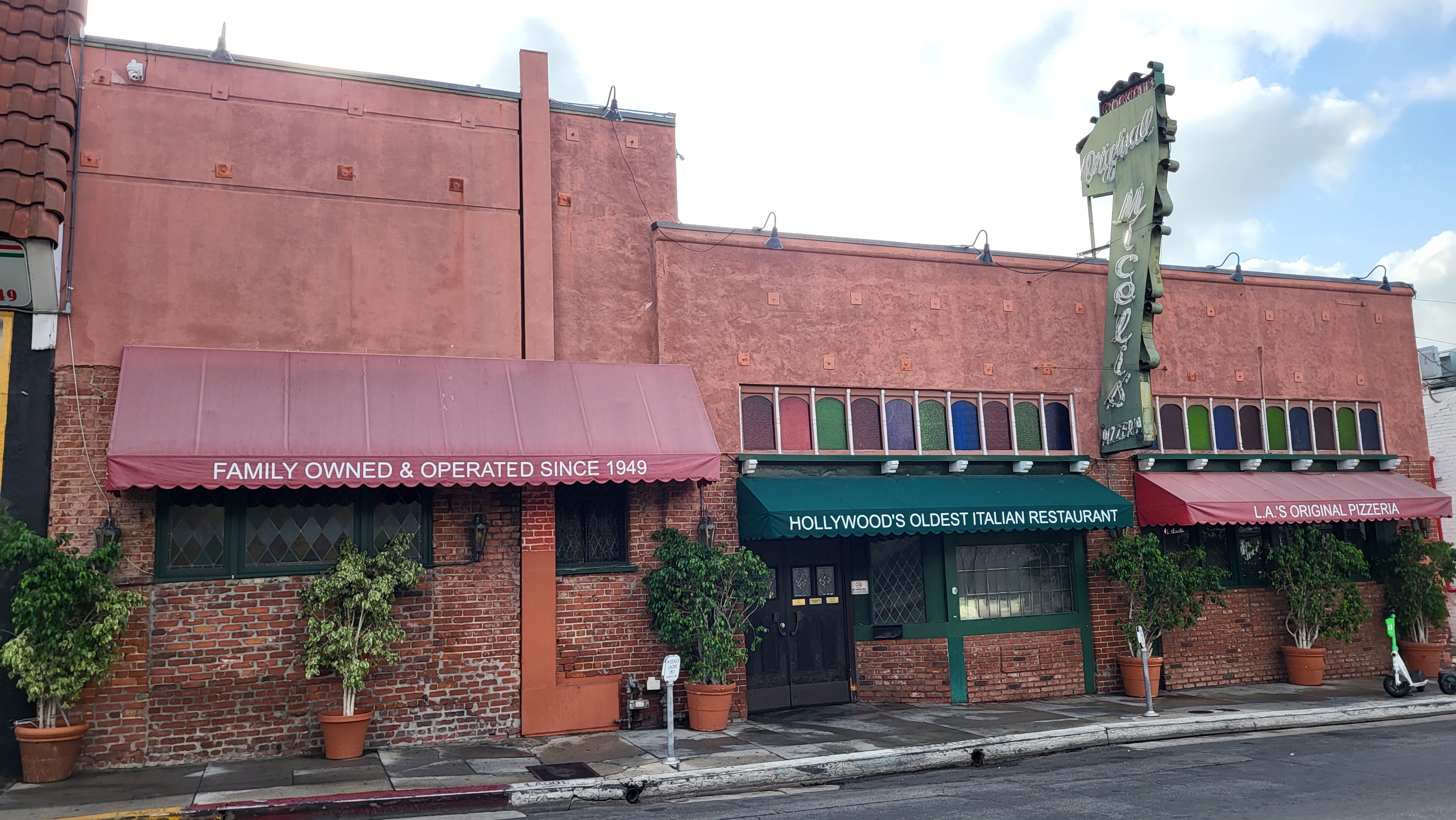
- Exterior of Miceli's in Hollywood, 2026
- Interactive map of Miceli's

Restaurant information
- Established: 1949; 77 years ago
- Food type: Italian cuisine
- Dress code: Casual, business casual
- Location: 1646 N Las Palmas Avenue, Hollywood, Los Angeles, California, United States
- Coordinates: 34.1015°N 118.3360°W
- Other locations: 3655 Cahuenga Blvd, Universal City, California
- Website: micelis.restaurant

Miceli's is an Italian restaurant located at 1646 N Las Palmas Avenue, half a block south of Hollywood Boulevard, in Hollywood, California. Open since 1949, it is the oldest Italian restaurant in Hollywood and is known for its singing waitstaff, several of whom were "right off Broadway."

== History ==
Miceli's was opened in 1949 by World War II veteran Carmen Miceli and his wife Sylvia with help from their brothers and sisters, and originally featured family recipes from Sicily. Originally a pizzeria, Miceli's was the first Italian restaurant in Hollywood and its wooden booths came from another historic Hollywood restaurant, the nearby Pig 'n Whistle.

In 1980, the restaurant opened a new location in Universal City, California. Other locations were opened in Burbank and Beverly Hills, but those have since closed.

== Clientele ==
Many notable figures, both inside and outside Hollywood, have dined at Miceli's over the years. Future presidents John F. Kennedy and Richard Nixon dined here before they were elected. Famed gangster Mickey Cohen was a visitor, as was West Coast mafia chieftain Angelo Marino, who also owned the California Cheese Company, of which the Micelis were his largest purchaser. Frank Sinatra and Marilyn Monroe were regulars, and Lucille Ball learned to flip pizzas in the restaurant's Beverly Hills location in preparation for the I Love Lucy episode Visitor from Italy. Pauley Perrette and John Stamos were such regulars that they would walk into the kitchen to chat with the staff, and Pele once visited and shut the kitchen down for thirty minutes, as the cooks were too busy talking to him.

Other notable figures who dined at Miceli's include Dean Martin, Joe DiMaggio, Sal Mineo, Elizabeth Taylor, Richard Burton, the Beatles, Jim Carrey, Adam Sandler, and Julia Roberts.

== Musical tradition ==
Miceli's is known for its musical tradition. Johnny Carson’s Tonight Show Band and Sarah Vaughn used to play at jazz nights hosted by the restaurant, and even moreso, the restaurant is known for its singing waitstaff, who often perform with a piano player during their dinner shifts. Historically, many of the waitstaff have been right off Broadway, including opening cast members of Jersey Boys, Beauty and the Beast, and Phantom of the Opera.

== In popular culture ==
Miceli's was the location where Sarah Conner saw a news report about her name in The Terminator, was the site of a double murder in Mob City, and was also featured in Knocked Up and season 8 of Dexter.
