= Pig 'n Whistle =

Hollywood restaurant and bar (1927–2021)

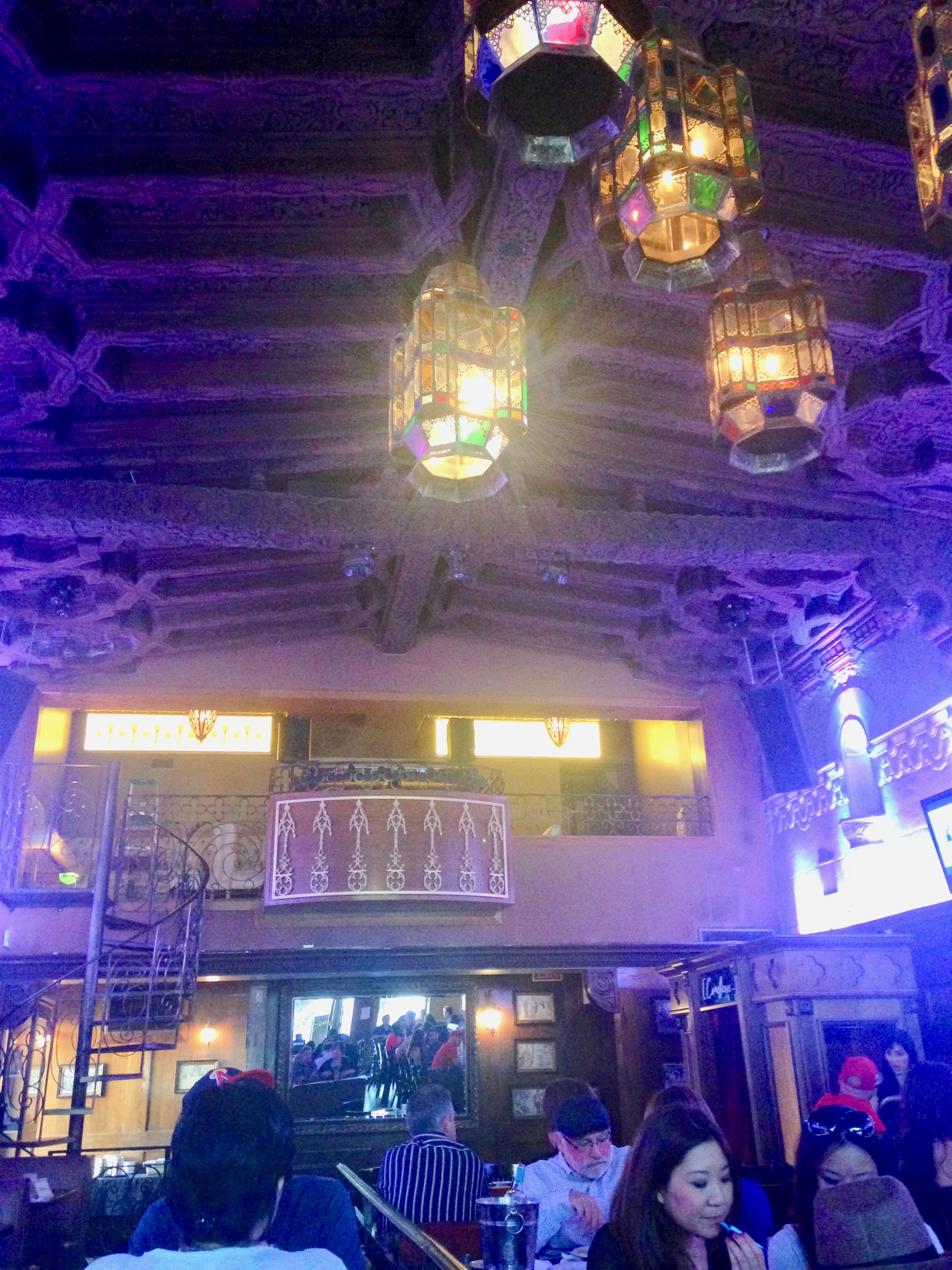
- Interior in 2025
- Location in Hollywood

Restaurant information
- Established: July 22, 1927; 99 years ago
- Closed: April 2021; 5 years ago
- Food type: American
- Dress code: Casual, business casual
- Location: 6714-18 Hollywood Boulevard, Hollywood, Los Angeles, Los Angeles, California, United States
- Coordinates: 34.1014°N 118.33673°W
- Other locations: Next to 224 S. Broadway, Downtown Los Angeles, opened 1908
- Website: pignwhistlehollywood.com

The Pig 'n Whistle was a chain of American restaurants and bars in Los Angeles founded in 1908 which included an architecturally notable location next to Grauman's Egyptian Theatre on Hollywood Boulevard.

== History ==
1927 Thanksgiving advertisement listing six Pig 'n Whistle shops, including the new Hollywood location

The Pig 'n Whistle was originally a chain of restaurants and candy shops, founded by John Gage in 1908. He opened his first location in Downtown Los Angeles, next to the 1888 City Hall at 224 S. Broadway. Restaurateur Sidney Hoedemaker joined the company in 1927 and led expansion efforts throughout Southern California. Hoedemaker purchased a downtown Los Angeles restaurant called Neve's Melody Lane in 1927 and adopted the name "Melody Lane" for new locations through the 1930s and 40s Hoedemaker left the Pig 'n Whistle in 1949 and started a chain of Hody's restaurants aimed at the young families moving into the Post WWII suburbs.

Pig 'n Whistle locations in downtown Los Angeles in 1927: 1. 611 S. Spring St.; 2. 439 S. Broadway; 3. 712 S. Broadway; 4. 744 S. Hill St.; 5. 807 W. 7th St. at Flower

The Hollywood location of the Pig 'n Whistle was first opened in 1927 next to Grauman's Egyptian Theatre. The building housing the new restaurant cost $225,000 and featured "[c]arved oak rafters, imported tiles, artistically wrought grilles and balcony and great panelled fresco paintings from Don Quixote." It was frequented by such celebrities as Spencer Tracy, Shirley Temple and Howard Hughes. The original Hollywood location closed down after World War II and its distinctive wooden furniture, decorated with hand-carved whistle-playing pigs, was sold to Miceli's Italian Restaurant, located around the corner at 1646 Las Palmas Avenue, where it remains to the present day.

The Pig 'N' Whistle Corporation was shut down by the government in 1970 for failing to pay taxes.

By the late 1990s the location housed a fast-food pizza restaurant, and all that remained of the original tenant was a bas-relief pig on the front of the building. In 1999, British restaurant operator Chris Breed remodeled the building, recovering the spectacular original ceiling ornamentation, and re-opened the restaurant.

The phrase "pig and whistle" is of English origin, dating back to Shakespeare's time, but its meaning is uncertain. One source claims that the restaurant name originates from two Old English words, piggin, a lead mug, and wassail, a wine associated with the Yuletide season.

From mid-March 2020 to April 2021, the COVID-19 pandemic forced the restaurant to serve customers in a take-away format. It soon closed, and in October 2021, the interior was gutted, with the exterior being crudely painted over, as a cantina would take over its space. This included the bas-relief pigs being covered by skulls to establish the new restaurant's theme. No modification permits had been taken out by the building's owner with the city of Los Angeles for either the exterior and interior. The cantina closed in 2026.

== Hollywood branch architecture ==
- Pig N' Whistle
- U.S. Historic district – Contributing property
- Exterior in 2014
- Built: 1919/1927
- Architect: Morgan, Walls & Clements
- Architectural style: Spanish Colonial Revival
- Part of: Hollywood Boulevard Commercial and Entertainment District (ID85000704)
- Designated CP: April 4, 1985

The building that housed Pig 'n Whistle was designed by Morgan, Walls & Clements and built in 1919/1927. It features a Spanish Colonial Revival design. In 1985, the Hollywood Boulevard Commercial and Entertainment District was added to the National Register of Historic Places, with the Pig N' Whistle building listed as a contributing property in the district. Aspects of the building cited in the register include its 1927 marquee, churrigueresque detailing, intact but hidden ceiling, wrought iron material, and its stone medallions and ornaments on its stucco facade.

== In popular culture ==
- 1950 - The Pig 'n Whistle was mentioned in the 11/12/1950 episode of The Jack Benny Program on radio.
- 1974 – In Chinatown, Noah Cross appears in front of a Pig 'n Whistle, but the scene was actually shot at a Pacific Dining Car.
- 2001 - Visiting... with Huell Howser Episode 909
- 2019 - The Pig 'n Whistle was mentioned in the song "Colorado Bound" by Big Smo, however it referred to a Denver marijuana dispensary

== Gallery ==
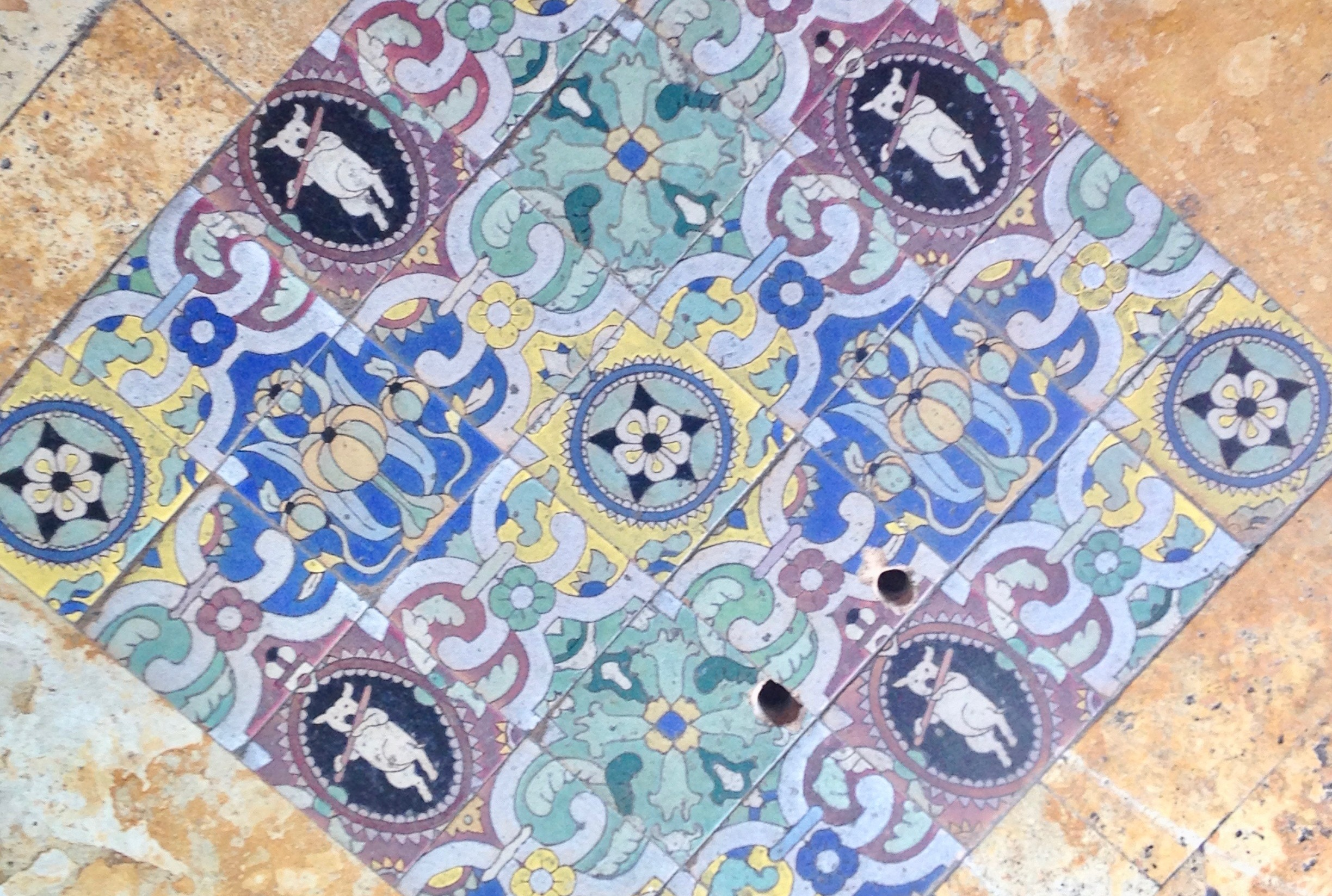
Tile work on the floor of the former Hollywood branch

1908 advertisement
