= Victoria Station (restaurant) =

Defunct US based chain of railroad-themed steakhouse restaurants

Victoria Station Acquisition Corporation
- Trade name: Victoria Station
- Type: Private
- Industry: Restaurant
- Predecessor: Victoria Station, Inc. (1969–1987)
- Founded: April 1969; 57 years ago San Francisco, California, U.S.
- Founder: Robert Freeman, Peter Lee, and Richard Bradley
- Defunct: 1992 (as chain in U.S.)
- Successor: Independently owned franchised restaurants in U.S.; Daiei and later Zensho in Japan
- Headquarters: Larkspur, California, U.S.
- Area served: United States, Japan
- Key people: Lowell Farkas, President, CEO and Director (1987–1992)
- Products: Prime rib, steak

Victoria Station was a chain of railroad-themed steakhouse restaurants. At the peak of its popularity in the 1970s, the chain had 100 locations in the United States. The firm filed for bankruptcy in 1986. The last remaining restaurant in the former chain was located in Salem, Massachusetts until it abruptly closed in December 2017.

A four-restaurant chain in Malaysia continues under the Victoria Station Restaurant name with a train theme but a significantly different menu; however, it claims an independent heritage, whereby the founding family thought up the concept on a London Underground train while on holiday in England.

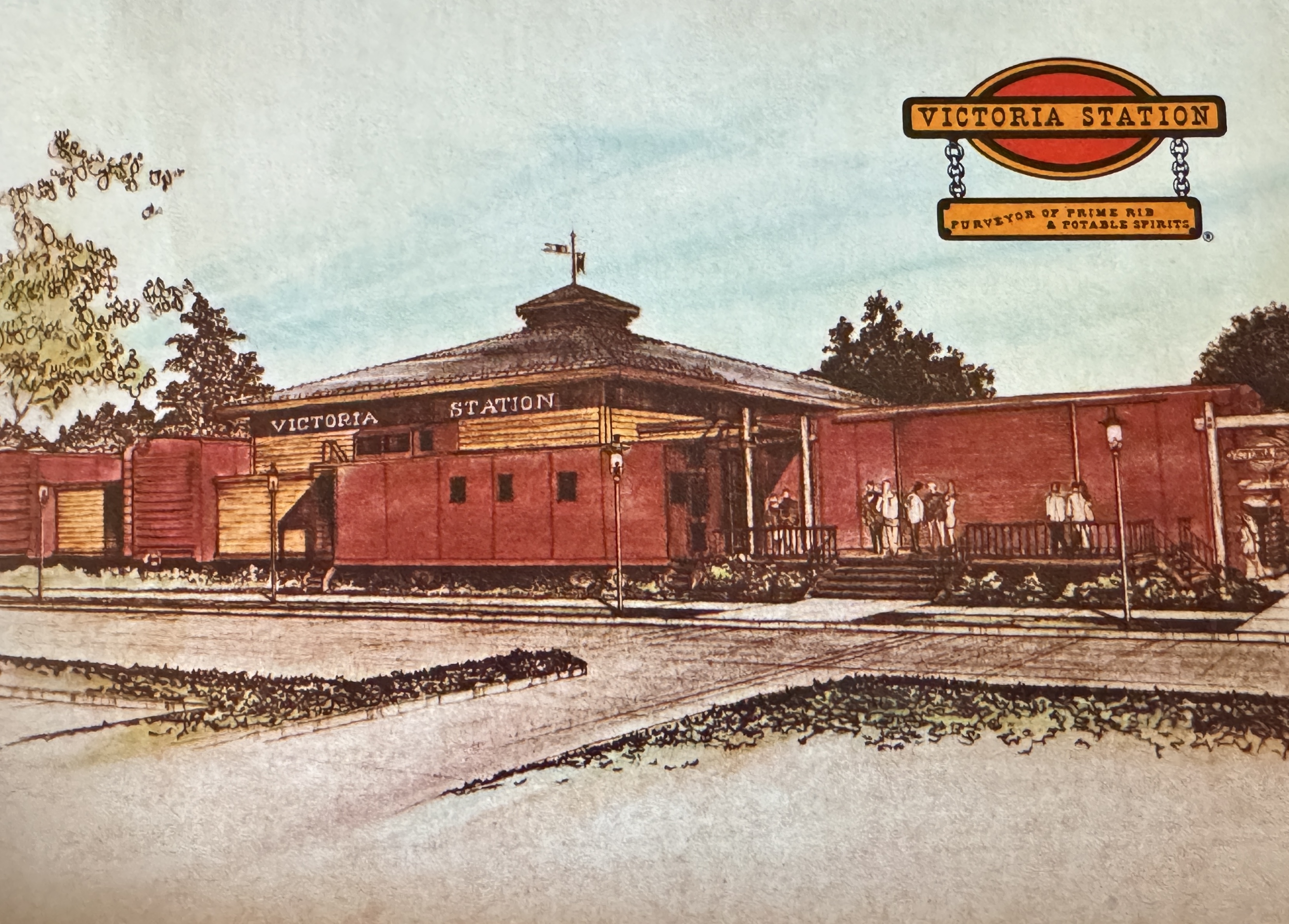

== History ==
The concept evolved from a Cornell University School of Hotel Administration graduate project, according to original owners Bob Freeman, Peter Lee, and Dick Bradley, all 1963 graduates of the school. The first location was opened in San Francisco in 1969 and was a 158-seat restaurant located on the Embarcadero at Broadway that was constructed out of five boxcars and two cabooses around a central lobby-service area. The restaurant was grossing $90,000 monthly during its first year of operations.

By the end of 1978, Victoria Station had 97 restaurants, all company owned.

The chain was designed to attract members of the baby boom generation. The theme of the restaurant was loosely based on London's Victoria Station. Antique English railway artifacts were used as decor inside, and the exteriors were composed of American Railway cars, primarily boxcars, with a signature Caboose placed in front. On the "entry platform" to each restaurant was a London-style phone booth. Prime rib was the featured item on a limited menu that included steaks, barbecued beef ribs, and shrimp done in a variation of scampi style known as "Shrimp Victoria". Most of the restaurants used authentic railway cars for dining areas, often boxcars or cabooses.

The Victoria Station chain flourished in the 1970s, according to a memoir by former Victoria Station corporate marketing manager Tom Blake. The company was among the first restaurant companies to offer its employees stock options and an ESOP program. The peak of success of the Victoria Station restaurant chain took place at the time of the culmination of a joint venture with Universal Studios, which resulted in the opening of Victoria Station Universal City, a location on the "hill" near where Universal CityWalk Hollywood now stands. At its peak, the Universal City location of Victoria Station was among the highest grossing restaurants in the United States. The coaches in the restaurant used four of the coaches from Flying Scotsman's tour of America. They were repainted and converted into dining cars.

The U.S. operations of the Victoria Station chain began running into financial difficulties in the mid-1980s, causing gradual shutdowns of the franchise restaurants. In May 1986, the company filed for Chapter 11 protection in the U.S. bankruptcy court. Eight months later, it was reported in January 1987 that the company had a restructuring plan in place that would require it to sell a number of restaurants.

A new company, called Victoria Station Acquisition Corporation and was controlled by Lowell Farkas, purchased the Victoria Station trademark and 11 of the restaurants for $6.5 million and the assumption of a $1 million tax liability.

There was a similar chain called "Twickenham Station" in Alabama and Florida during the same time span. They were not connected. (Huntsville AL, Montgomery AL, Mobile AL, Pensacola FL)

== Promotions ==
Singer Johnny Cash produced a promotional album of train songs for the chain, titled Destination Victoria Station, which was then sold in the restaurants. This included the title song of the same name written and performed by Cash specifically for the album.

The chain was a sponsor of the United States Ski Team at least from 1977 to 1979 For several years, the Park City Ski Area (Mountain Resort) -- at which the US Olympic Ski team practices -- named one of its ski lifts Victoria Station.

Alfred Hitchcock flipped the railroad switch for the official opening of Victoria Station Universal City, on May 2, 1977. That restaurant included a funicular which carried patrons 600 feet up from the lower parking lot.

== Known locations in the U.S. ==
The following locations in the U.S. are known to have at one time housed a Victoria Station restaurant:

- Alabama
  - Birmingham (opened 1975 on Morris Avenue, now home to Kinetic Communications)
- Arizona
  - Phoenix
- California
  - Burlingame (now Kincaid's Bayhouse)
  - Larkspur, California (a/k/a Victoria Station Marin County)
  - Los Angeles (including one in Hollywood; see Universal City below)
  - Marin (located in Larkspur) (demolished, date unknown)
  - Newport Beach (corner of Macarthur and Jamboree)
  - Northridge
  - Oakland (closed. Once a part of the former Jack London Village. Building still stands in 2019, complete with boxcars and caboose. Now part of "Embarcadero Cove Marine," adjacent to the SF Bay Trail.)
  - Roseville (closed, but buildings remain as of February 2024)
  - Sacramento
  - San Diego (train cars moved to another city, location now a Del Taco, next door to In Cahoots, formerly Confetti's)
  - San Francisco (original location, demolished after the quake of 1989)
  - Sunnyvale 855 East Homestead Rd- partially disguised dining and caboose car still visible from the street. (Google street view) (was a Vietnamese soup restaurant now permanently closed)
  - Tahoe City
  - Torrance (previously incorrectly listed as demolished-as of April 2007 location operating as the South Bay Grill, 23805 Hawthorne Bl, Torrance CA 90505. Boxcars and caboose are intact with building) (demolished as of mid 2010)
  - Universal City
  - Villa Park
  - West Covina
  - Westminster (Orange County)
  - Woodland Hills (later became "Bonkers" then eventually demolished)
- Colorado
  - Glendale (demolished)The Victoria Station restaurant was located in the parking lot of a Target store in Glendale CO a small suburb of Denver near the intersection of Alameda Ave and Leetsdale Drive (some sources say Alameda Ave and Colorado Blvd.)
  - Golden
- Connecticut
  - Darien (building still standing, but the rail cars removed, now a Bertucci's)
- Florida
  - Altamonte Springs (was on West SR 436, now demolished)
  - Casselberry (on Fernwood Blvd)
  - Ft. Lauderdale, FL (corner of E. Cypress Creek (NE 62nd St.) & Dixie Hwy, demolished, unknown disposition of caboose & boxcars)
  - Jacksonville (demolished, date unknown)
  - Miami (2 locations first one in Miami on NW 36th Street just north of the airport & 64th Avenue (demolished in 1994) property for sale and inside the Dadeland Mall, demolished in the early 1990s, now a Victoria's Secret)
  - North Miami Beach
  - Tampa
  - Virginia Gardens
  - West Palm Beach (located on Palm Beach Lakes Blvd @ I-95 (demolished, now Olive Garden)
- Georgia
  - Atlanta (there were at least three, all now demolished. One was near Cumberland Mall (2785 Cumberland Pkwy SE, Atlanta, GA 30339) one near Northlake Mall, and another on Piedmont, just south of Lindbergh)
  - Macon (Macon Mall)
- Hawai'i
  - Honolulu, HI (on Kapiolani Blvd. in Waikiki; demolished)
  - Plantation Gardens, Hawaii (Kauai)
- Illinois
  - Niles (now a Russian restaurant called "Moscow Nights")
  - Northbrook (across from Peacock Palace and Holiday Inn, site now a National Pride self car wash)
  - Schaumburg
  - Villa Park
- Indiana
  - Indianapolis (opened 1973 @ 7279 N.Keystone Ave, demolished 1988)
- Kentucky
  - Louisville
- Louisiana
  - New Orleans
- Maryland
  - Gaithersburg (now a Bugaboo Creek Steakhouse; burned March 10, 2005/reopened February, 2006)
- Massachusetts
  - Burlington (128 Middlesex Turnpike. Location closed in 2005, building demolished; a Border Cafe is now on the site)
  - Boston (located near South Station, now demolished, old photo at )
  - Framingham
  - Salem (closed December 2017; future site Finz Restaurant)
- Michigan
  - Southfield (later became "Bonkers" then eventually demolished)
  - Troy (on Big Beaver Road; became a "Bonkers" then eventually demolished)
- Minnesota
  - Bloomington (now an Olive Garden restaurant)
  - Roseville
- Missouri
  - Kansas City 2 locations, 103rd & Wornall and River Market area. 103rd became Spaghetti Factory, but demolished and now car dealership.
  - St. Louis
- Nevada
  - Reno (now an Olive Garden restaurant)
- New Jersey
  - Maple Shade (was on Rte. 70, now demolished, site of an Audi dealership / Cherry Hill Imports)
  - East Brunswick (on Rt. 18 same lot as Brunswick Square Mall; now an Olive Garden restaurant. Rail cars were removed. No original structure remains. Unknown where rail cars went.
  - Wayne (now a market research facility)
  - Whippany (demolished, now site of a CVS)
- New York
  - Albany - Sand Creek Rd. (site is now Barnsider restaurant)
  - White Plains
  - Latham
  - Yonkers, (boxcars are offices for a Sanitation Company. As of 2018, it appears to be demolished).
- North Carolina
  - Charlotte
- Ohio
  - Cincinnati (the downtown and east locations are both demolished)
  - Columbus</ref (was on Hwy 161, now demolished) **[[Maumee, Ohio|Maumee]] structure still there, converted to Fricker's restaurant, box cars and caboose are externally covered but can still be seen for inside **[[Orange, Ohio|Orange Village]] (located on Orange Place near Interstate 271; now demolished - another structure now occupies the site) **[[Rocky River, Ohio|Rocky River]]<ref name="Prime Rib & Boxcars" />
  - Woodmere - see Orange Village, above.
- Oklahoma
  - Tulsa (decorative train water tower still standing in 2018)
- Oregon
  - Portland (at SW Macadam and Nebraska, demolished, caboose saved and relocated near Hillsboro Airport) Opened in 1973, restaurant number 14; closed in 1986 with bankruptcy of the chain. A Mount Hood chairlift named Victoria Station was associated with the restaurant's opening: the chair was in service from 1966 through 2000 (when it was upgraded and renamed Molly's Express).
  - Quinn's Lighthouse
- Pennsylvania
  - King of Prussia (later became "Bonkers" then Rib It and then eventually demolished. McDonald's now stands on this site.)
  - Monroeville, Pennsylvania (demolished; Land now used by Petco)
  - Philadelphia (demolished)
  - Pittsburgh
  - Willow Grove (later Boston Sea Party, directly adjacent to Pennsylvania Turnpike interchange, formerly Exit 27, now Exit 343. Demolished, now site of Courtyard by Marriott
- Tennessee
  - Knoxville
  - Memphis (demolished; was located near the intersection of Mendenhall and Mt. Moriah).
- Texas
  - Amarillo (now demolished)
  - Arlington (now demolished)
  - Austin (now houses a Longhorn Steakhouse)
  - Dallas/Fort Worth
  - Houston (now a Droubi's Imports)
  - San Antonio
- Utah
  - Salt Lake City
- Virginia
  - Alexandria (demolished - Public Storage now on site)
  - Fairfax (demolished; CVS/pharmacy now on site; next door to an Outback Steakhouse)
  - Richmond (currently the home of Brick Road Coffee Company).
  - Virginia Beach
- Washington
  - Seattle (became a Thai restaurant on Eastlake Ave.)
- Wisconsin
  - Wauwatosa

== Worldwide Locations ==
- Canada
  - Montréal (demolished)
  - Toronto (demolished)
  - Vancouver (now closed)
- Paris, France
- Japan
  - Kitami complete with Big Boy statue
  - Kobe (named "Central Station" which was Victoria Station's chain, now closed)
  - Osaka (now closed)
  - Sapporo complete with Big Boy statues
  - Tokyo (still running under the name Victoria Station)
  - Yokohama (now closed)

== International ==
In 1979, Daiei and Wendy's International formed a joint company called Wenco Japan Inc. that operated Victoria Station franchise steak houses and Wendy's fast-food restaurants in Japan. In 2002, Daiei sold Wenco Japan, which included the Victoria Station franchised restaurants, to Zensho for 4.60 billion yen. The brand continues to be operated in Japan under the Zensho firm.

== See also ==
- List of steakhouses
- Pacific Dining Car
