= B. H. Dyas =

- Industry: Retailing
- Predecessor: Dyas & Cline
- Founded: 1905; 120 years ago in Los Angeles
- Founder: Bernal Hubert Dyas; George T. Cline
- Defunct: 1932
- Fate: Bankruptcy
- Headquarters: United States

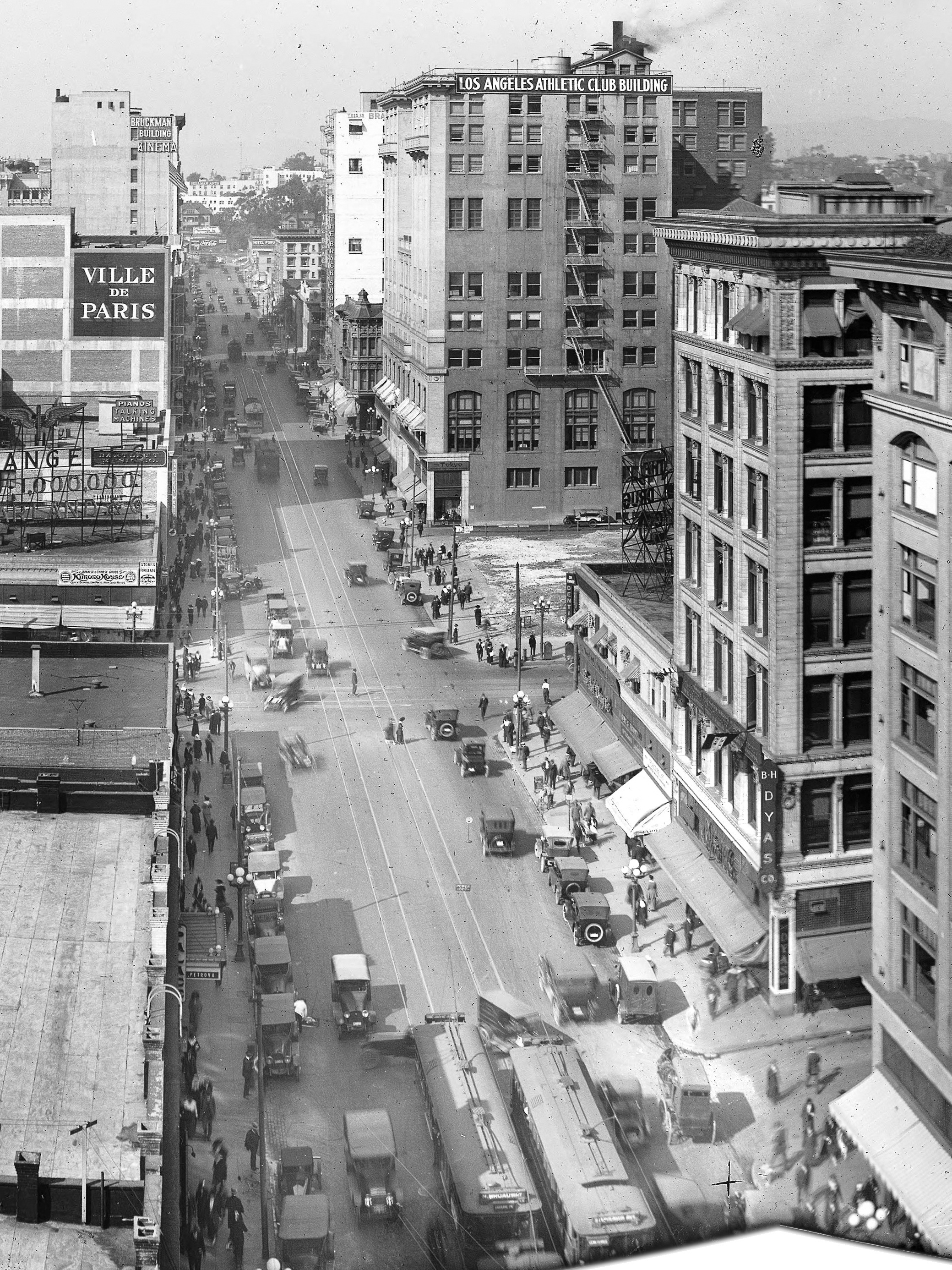
Seventh Street looking west from Broadway, 1917. Bullocks building is at the far right. B. H. Dyas, then a sporting goods store, is visible right and Ville de Paris, before Dyas bought it in 1919, visible left.

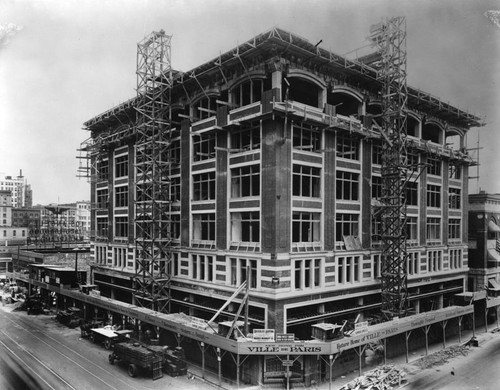
B. H. Dyas flagship building under construction as the Ville de Paris, 7th Street & Olive, 1916

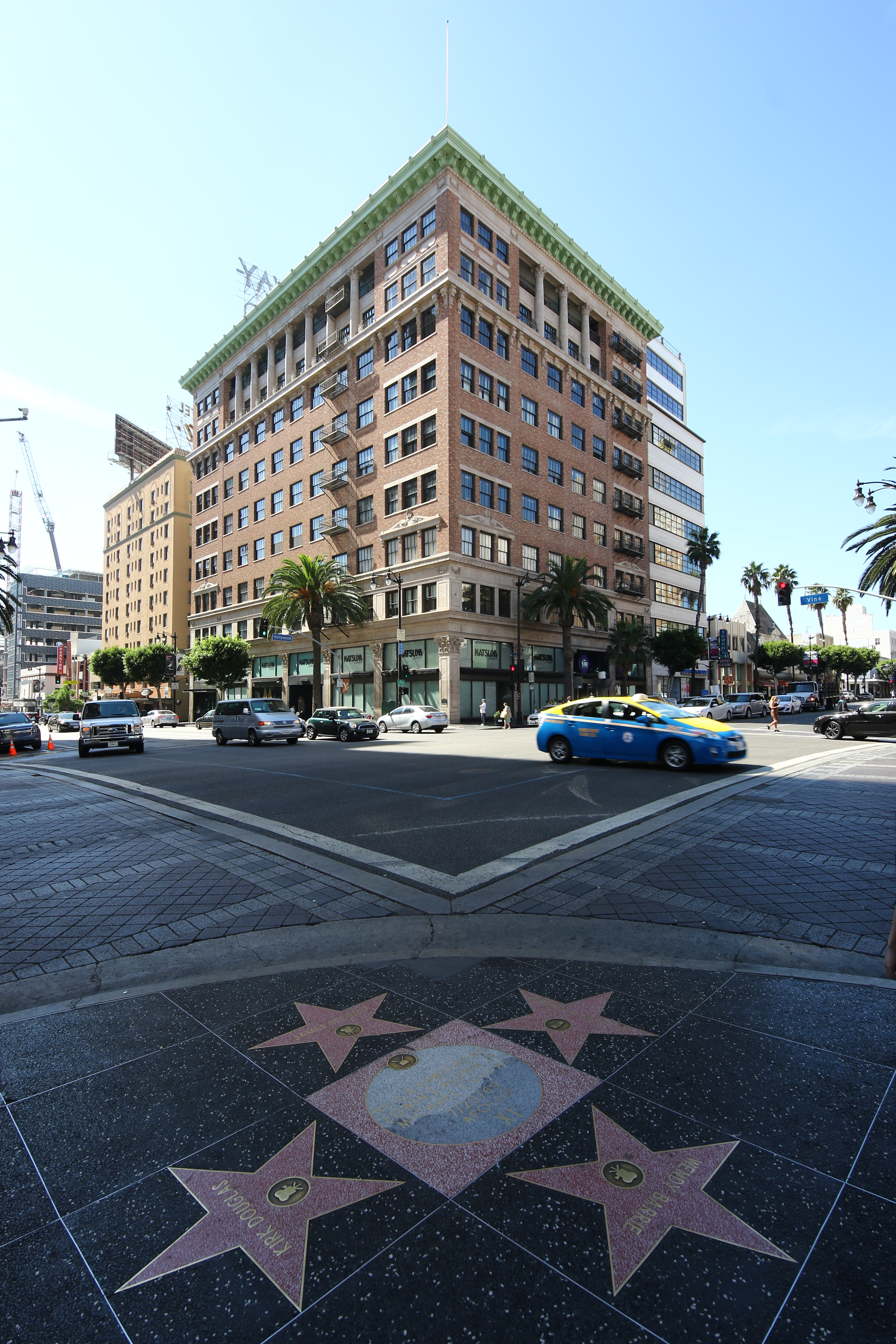
Broadway Hollywood Building. originally B. H. Dyas' Hollywood branch

B. H. Dyas Co. was a Los Angeles sporting goods retailer that turned into a department store and went out of business in the 1930s, owned by Bernal Hubert Dyas (1882–1959).

== Origins as sporting goods store ==
Dyas opened a sporting goods store, Dyas & Cline, with partner George T. Cline at Main & 3rd (116 E. 3rd St.) in 1905. Later, Dyas was located on 7th at Hill.

== Seventh & Olive department store ==
In 1919, the owners of the Ville de Paris department store at 321-5 W. 7th Street at Olive, sold the store to Dyas. The store advertised as "Ville de Paris–B. H. Dyer Co." from 1919 through 1927, then simply as B. H. Dyas. The Downtown store and with it, the B. H. Dyas name, closed around 1930. The Seventh and Olive building is now occupied by the Los Angeles Jewelry Mart, a constituent of what is now the Jewelry District, part of the Historic Core district.

The store advertised as “The Most Interesting Store in California”. It had inside a log cabin, a rifle range, and an aquarium of rainbow trout, as well as stuffed and mounted game animals.

== Hollywood branch ==
In 1927, Dyas opened a branch in Hollywood in what is now the Broadway Hollywood Building. In 1922, stock was sold to finance its construction to house a branch of Boadway Bros., which went out of business in 1923, and B. H. Dyas agreed to open in the building instead. The Classical Revival Style building was built by local businessman Frank R. Strong to house Dyas' store. Frederick Rice Dorn was the architect. The construction, which continued into 1928, marked the first department store branch outside of the main Downtown Los Angeles central business district and led to similar large-scale commercial developments outside downtown such as Bullocks Wilshire. Due to the Great Depression, B. H. Dyas had to consolidate its operation back to its original store and The Broadway purchased the 30-year lease for $2 million (US$41.4 million in 2024 dollars) in 1931.

== Demise ==
The 7th and Olive store went into receivership in 1932, and closed in 1933, thus ending the B. H. Dyer department store. Myer Siegel came to occupy the 7th & Olive building.

Dyas' son died in an automobile collision in Rawlins, Wyoming in October 1933. Dyas died in 1959.
