= Equitable Building of Hollywood =

Historic office building in Los Angeles, California

- U.S. Historic district – Contributing property
- Los Angeles Historic-Cultural Monument
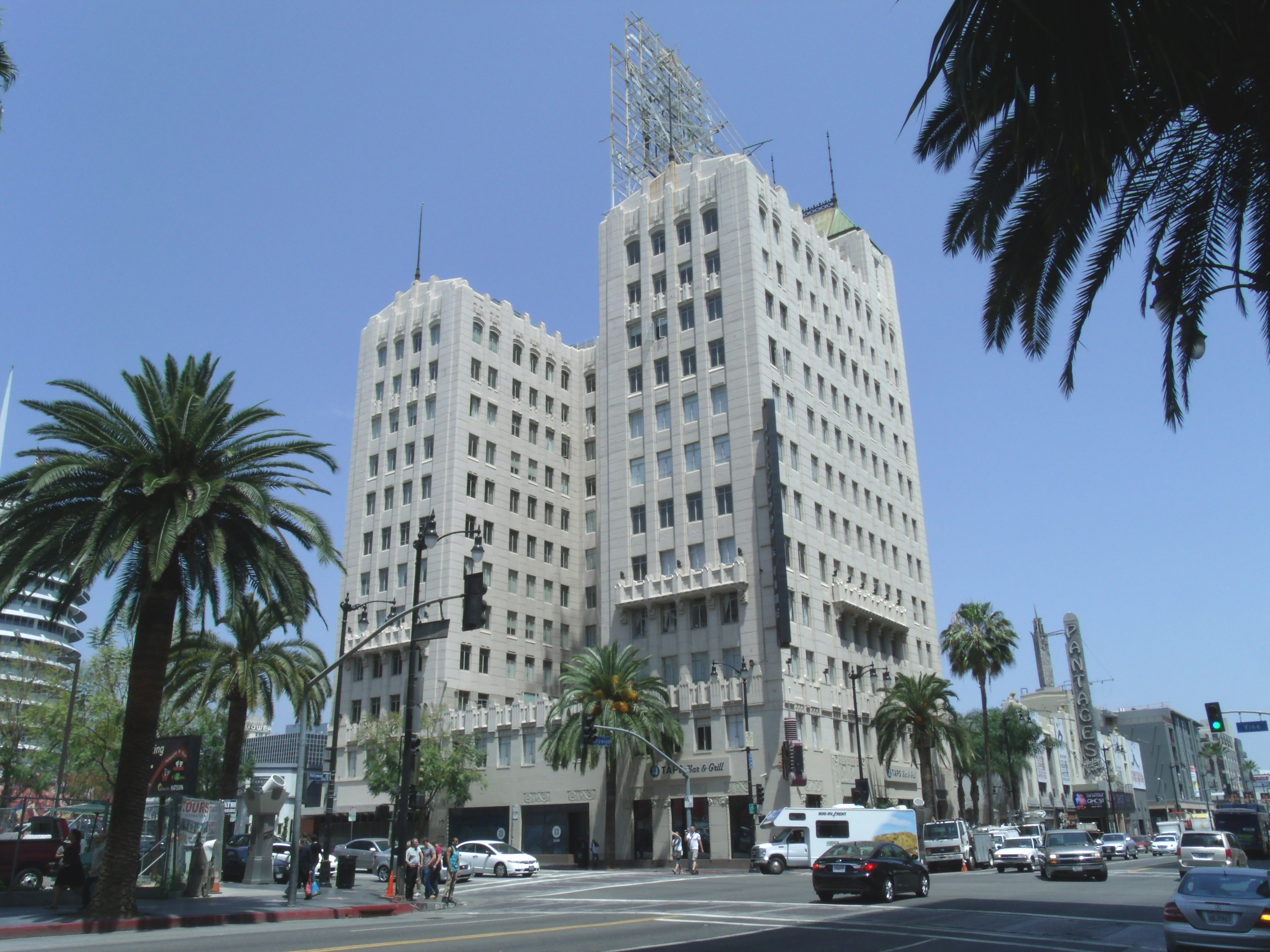
- The building in 2014

- Location within the Los Angeles metropolitan area Location within California Location within the United States
- Location: 6253 W. Hollywood Blvd; Hollywood, California
- Coordinates: 34.1020°N 118.3263°W
- Built: 1929, 1931
- Architect: Alex Curlett
- Architectural style: Gothic Revival, Art Deco
- Part of: Hollywood Boulevard Commercial and Entertainment District (ID85000704)
- LAHCM No.: 1088

Significant dates
- Designated CP: April 4, 1985
- Designated LAHCM: May 13, 2015

Equitable Building of Hollywood, also known as the Bank of Hollywood Building and The Lofts at Hollywood and Vine, is a historic twelve-story former office building, now condominium located at 6253 W. Hollywood Boulevard, Hollywood, California, at the intersection of Hollywood and Vine.

== History ==
Hollywood's Equitable Building was envisioned as part an infrastructure plan to "metropolitanize" Hollywood as an urban core. It was designed by Alex Curlett in a late Gothic Revival and Art Deco style, and developed by G.R. Dexter, president of the nearby Guaranty Building, and Samuel Kress. The building was built in two phases; the first was completed in 1929 and created 27,800 sq. ft of office space above ground floor retail, while the second, completed in 1931, more than doubled the size of the building, making it the largest office building in Hollywood.

The building reached full occupancy soon after each construction phase was completed, and almost immediately, it anchored Hollywood and Vine as the epicenter for Hollywood's finance and entertainment industries. Bank of Hollywood moved into the building as soon as phase one construction was completed, and the building was thus named the Bank of Hollywood Building. Myron Selznick's talent agency, the first talent agency in Hollywood, occupied the entire seventh floor, and Kenneth P. Butler's Butler Health Institute occupied the twelfth floor, with an additional solarium and squash court on the roof. By 1939, many advertising agencies including Young and Rubicam and William Esty and Company occupied the building, and the building was also popular with radio agents and producers throughout the 1930s and 40s.

The building's street level was remodeled in the 1950s and in 1969, the building underwent a $1 million ($8.78 million in 2025) renovation, after which nearby Capitol Records occupied 44,500 sq. ft of office space on the third through eighth floors. Despite this, the building, as with the rest of the area, experienced high vagrancy and decline from the 1960s to 1990s.

In 1985, the Hollywood Boulevard Commercial and Entertainment District was added to the National Register of Historic Places, with Equitable Building listed as a contributing property in the district.

The building was rehabilitated between 1999 and 2001, one of the first in Hollywood to do so. During the rehabilitation, many of the 1969 modernizations were remediated and the original features reconstructed.

In 2007, the building underwent a $50 million ($77.6 million in 2025) condominium conversion, after which the owners renamed it The Lofts at Hollywood and Vine. The building now consists of 60 units.

In 2015, the building was designated Los Angeles Historic-Cultural Monument No. 1088.

== Architecture and design ==
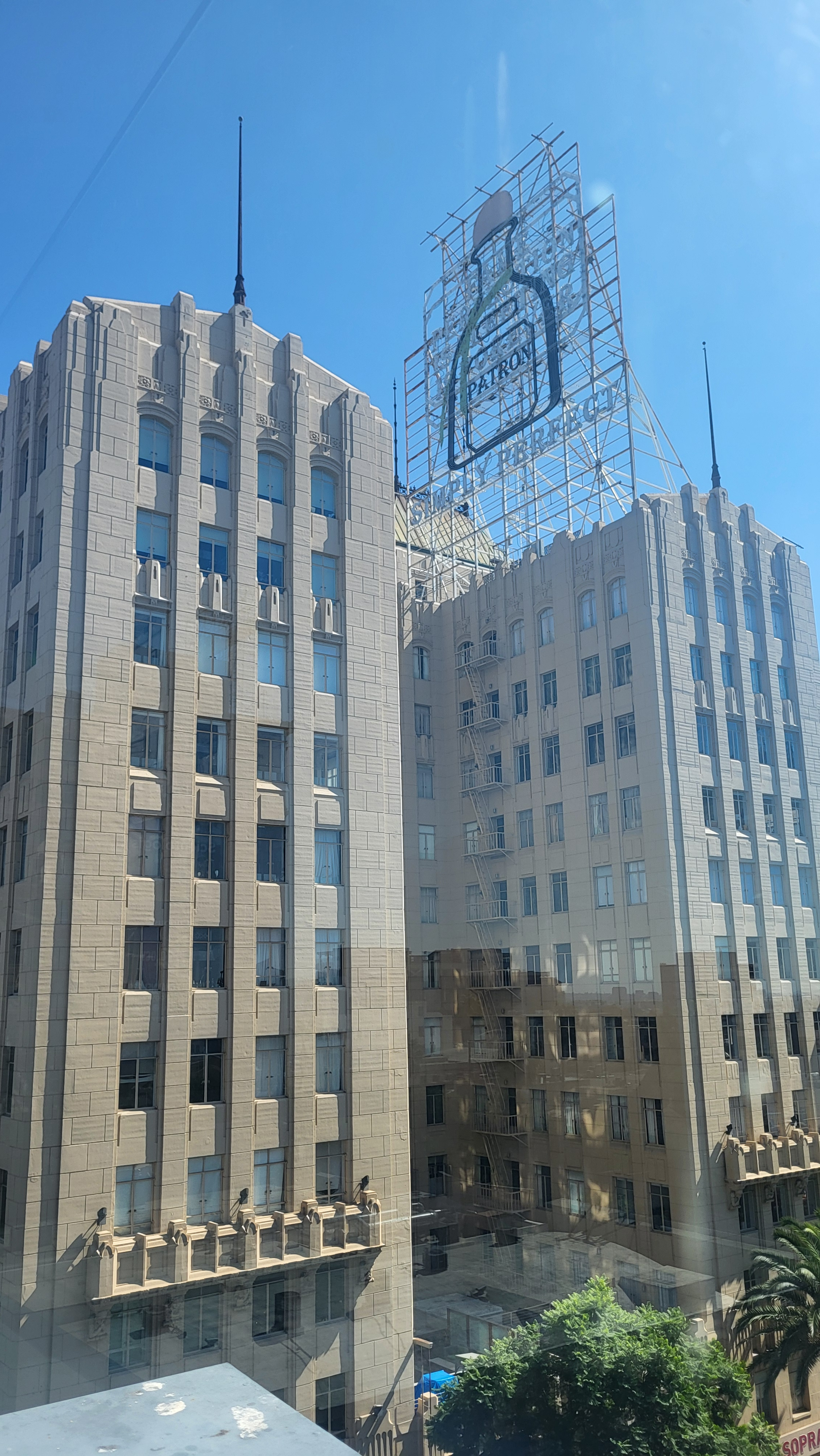
The upper floors of the north and south sections

The Equitable Building is a reinforced concrete construction, with an exterior finished in painted cast stone with select elements articulated in terra cotta. The first and second stories are rectangular in shape, creating a plinth for the U- shaped upper stories. The roof is flat and made of asphalt, and a sign is attached to the side of the building, facing north.

The building's lobby is its most ornate interior. Art deco in character, it features marble and stone floor, walls, and elevator surroundings, as well as decorative mouldings, vault ceiling, and an entrance vestibule distinguished by pilasters. Four elevator bays are located in the lobby, each with bronze paneled doors.

According to the Los Angeles Department of City Planning, the Equitable Building "exhibits many character-defining features of the Late Gothic Revival and Art Deco styles, including:

- Rectangular massings with emphasis on verticality created by slightly projecting piers
- Wrought iron flourishes, including tall finials and cresting
- Emphasis on verticality
- Steeply pitched roof with finials, pinnacles, towers and spires
- Decorative spandrel panels
- Terra cotta ornamentation in the shape of flowers, shields, and grotesques"

The building's eastern-facing exterior is mostly blank because of plans for a ten-story office building atop the neighboring Hollywood Pantages Theatre, which would have blocked any windows placed here. The ten story office building, however, was never built.

== See also ==
- List of Los Angeles Historic-Cultural Monuments in Hollywood
- List of contributing properties in the Hollywood Boulevard Commercial and Entertainment District
