= Pacific Dining Car =

Former restaurant chain in California, USA

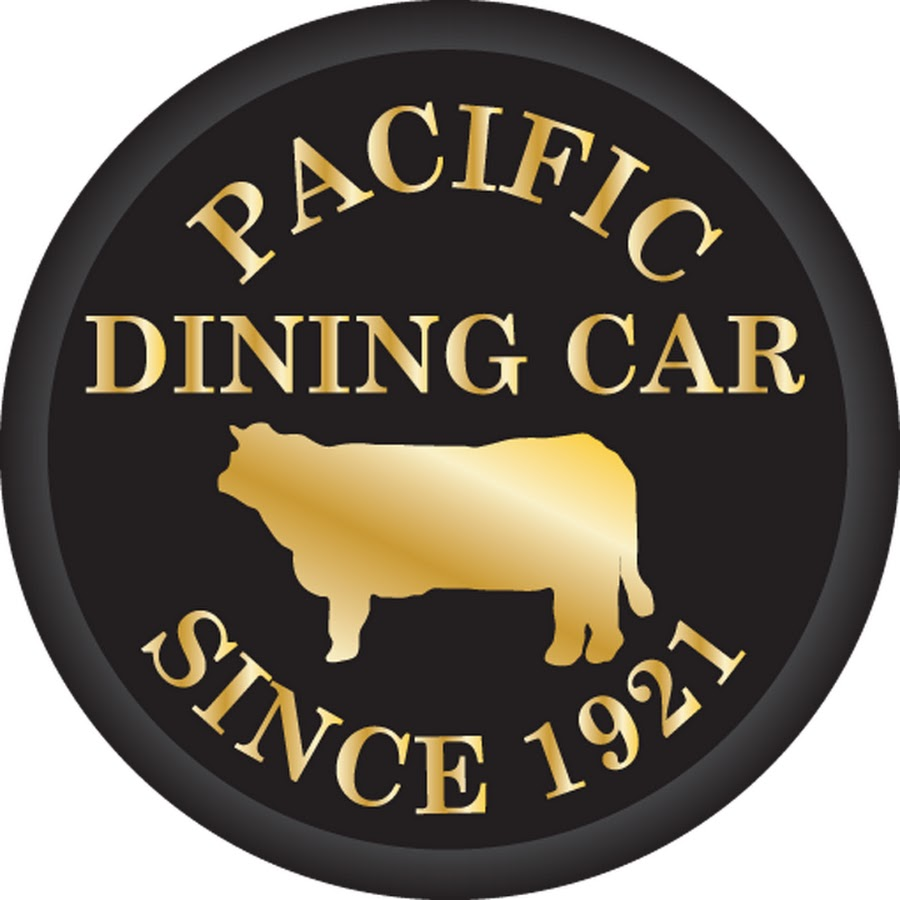

Restaurant information
- Established: 1921; 105 years ago
- Owner: Wes Idol III (great-grandchild of the founders)
- Previous owners: Fred Cook, Grace Cook
- Food type: Steakhouse
- Dress code: Casual wear, business casual
- Location: 1310 W. 6th St., Los Angeles, California, United States
- Website: pacificdiningcar.com

Pacific Dining Car is a culturally significant luxury steakhouse business in Los Angeles, California. It was founded in 1921 by Fred and Grace Cook in the backyard of a friend's house in Los Angeles. In 1990, the business expanded to Santa Monica. In 2020, it shifted to delivery and takeaway services due to the COVID-19 pandemic, later transitioning to online offerings and pop-ups. In August 2024, the structure sustained heavy damage from a fire. However, Wes Idol III, the great-grandson of the founders, announced that restoration efforts would continue.

The restaurant was known as Los Angeles' only 24-hour fine dining establishment, open every day of the year, including Christmas and other holidays. Pacific Dining Car was also featured in films and TV series such as Training Day and Shameless.

== History ==
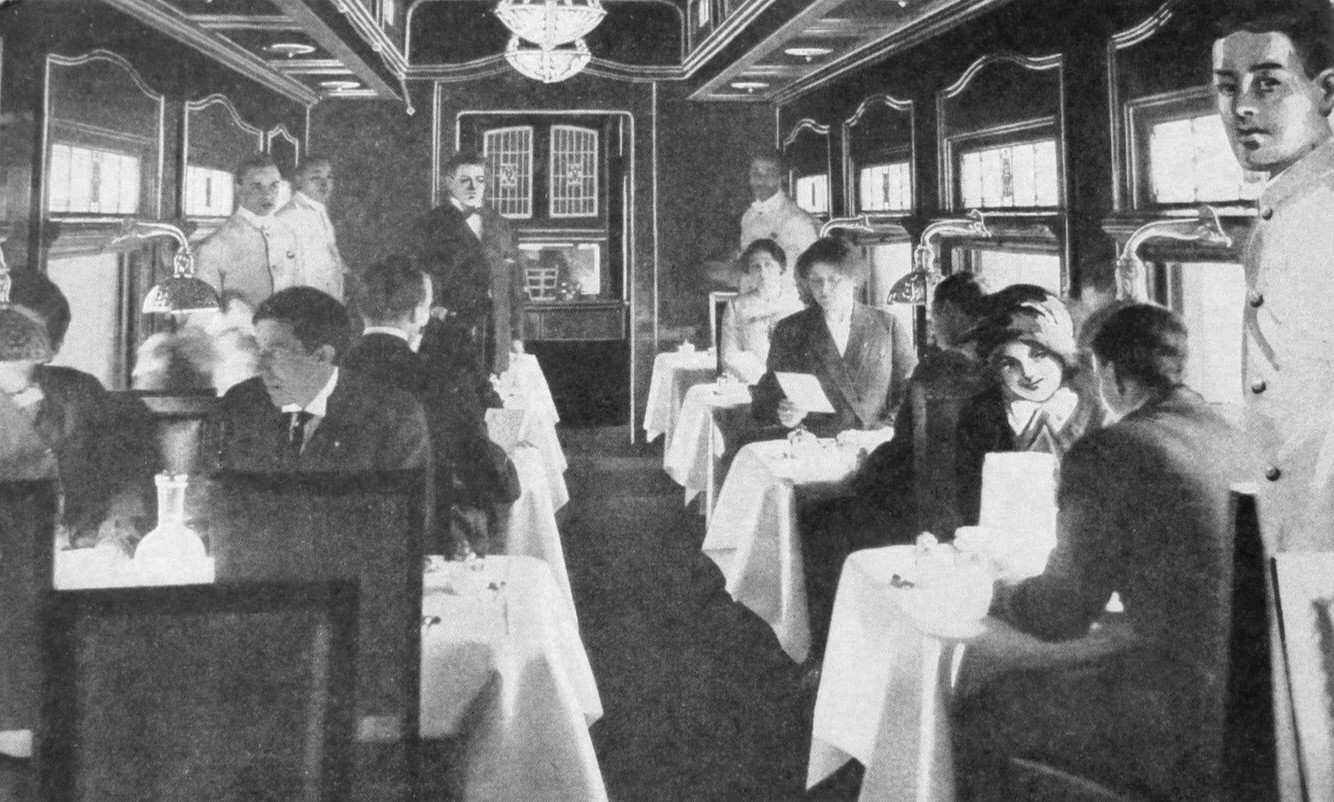
Dining car interior on the Santa Fe de Luxe, a train serving LA, in 1911

Fred and Grace Cook were inspired by a business with a similar theme and pitched the idea of a modified railway dining car experience. A friend allowed them to use his backyard to construct the dining car, which was retrofitted to provide more spacious and comfortable seating. Once completed, the dining car was moved to 7th and Westlake in Los Angeles.

In 1923, the location at 7th and Westlake was bought out, forcing the restaurant to relocate to its current site at 1310 W. 6th Street in Los Angeles.

In 1927, a San Diego rancher taught Fred Cook how to select, hang, and age beef for steaks. This led the restaurant to establish an on-site curing box for aging beef.

During the Great Depression, Pacific Dining Car staff fed the hungry in the evenings and donated leftovers to nearby missions.

After Fred Cook died in 1947, Grace Cook continued to operate the restaurant until 1960, when it was sold to their daughter Virginia and her husband, Wes Idol.

Wes Idol died in 1970, and Virginia retained ownership. Their son, Wes Idol II, purchased the restaurant in 1975 and promoted his son, Wes Idol III, to president in 2000, continuing the family legacy.

In 2020, the COVID-19 pandemic led to the closure of the Santa Monica location and the original Westlake site. Most of the restaurant’s memorabilia was auctioned, and the business transitioned to online meat sales. In 2023, the Los Angeles City Council designated the original Pacific Dining Car as a historic-cultural monument. Restoration efforts began, but on August 3, 2024, the building was heavily damaged by a fire. Despite the setback, Wes Idol III confirmed that restoration efforts would continue.

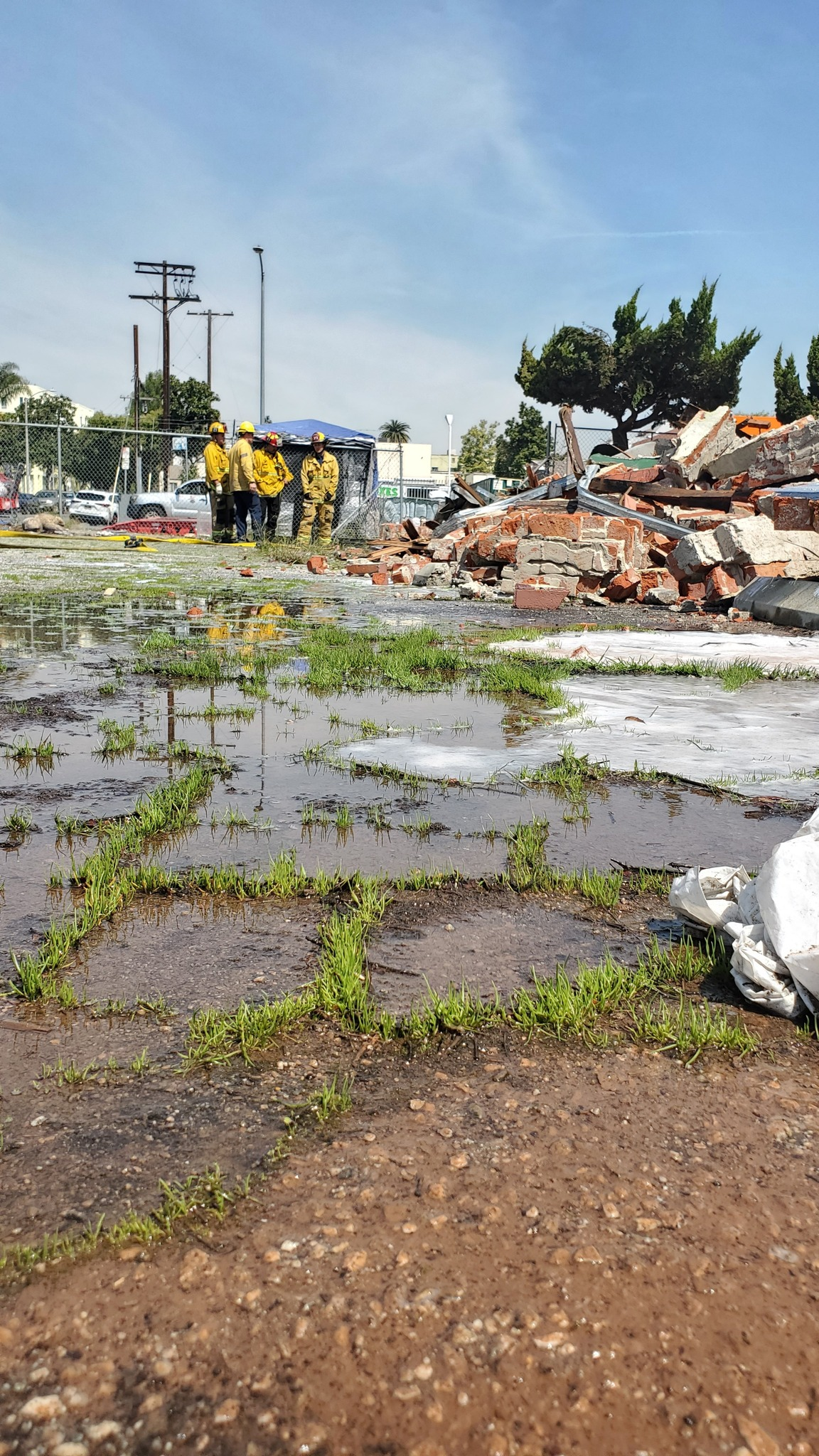
Firefighters observing the demolition of the Pacific Dining Car on March 20, 2025, after a fire destroyed the building

In the early morning of March 20, 2025, another fire burned and left the building uninhabitable. The original faux train car and dining room was demolished later that day by the Los Angeles Fire Department. The kitchen was damaged but was not bulldozed. The cause of the fire is under investigation.

In the early hours of July 1, 2025, a third fire occurred, at a building directly adjacent to the Dining Car site, less than a year after the first incident.

== Menu and clientele ==
The restaurant’s menus were categorized by meal times: Breakfast, Lunch, Dinner, and Desserts. Special menus included Afternoon Tea, available by appointment, and a Late-Night menu served from 10 PM to 6 AM. Delivery was offered for all menu items.

Located in downtown Los Angeles, the restaurant attracted a diverse clientele, including stockbrokers, lawyers, reporters, and celebrities. Notable patrons included columnist Louella Parsons, actor George Raft, gangster Mickey Cohen, and cultural icon Mae West. Actors Nicolas Cage and Johnny Depp, as well as Mayor Eric Garcetti, also dined there.

== Media appearances ==
As one of Los Angeles' oldest restaurants, Pacific Dining Car was featured in several films and TV series. In the film Training Day (2001), Denzel Washington’s character recommended the restaurant’s "baseball steak," which led to the steak being renamed "Training Day" on its lunch menu. The restaurant also appeared in Chinatown (1974), Street Kings (2008), and Rampart (2011).

== See also ==
- Victoria Station
