= SS Neckar =

SS Neckar may refer to one of the following North German Lloyd steamships:

- SS Neckar (1874), passenger ship in service 1874–1896; scrapped at Genoa, 1896.
- SS Neckar (1901), passenger ship in service 1901–1917; seized by United States; served as troopship USS Antigone (ID-3007); served as SS Potomac for United States Lines, 1921–1922; scrapped at Baltimore, 1927.
- SS Neckar (1927), cargo ship in service from 1927, renamed Sperrbrecher 8 in 1939, heavily damaged at Brest in 1944 and scuttled.
