= Hollywood and Vine =

Street intersection in Los Angeles

- Prospect and Weyse Avenues (1887–1910)
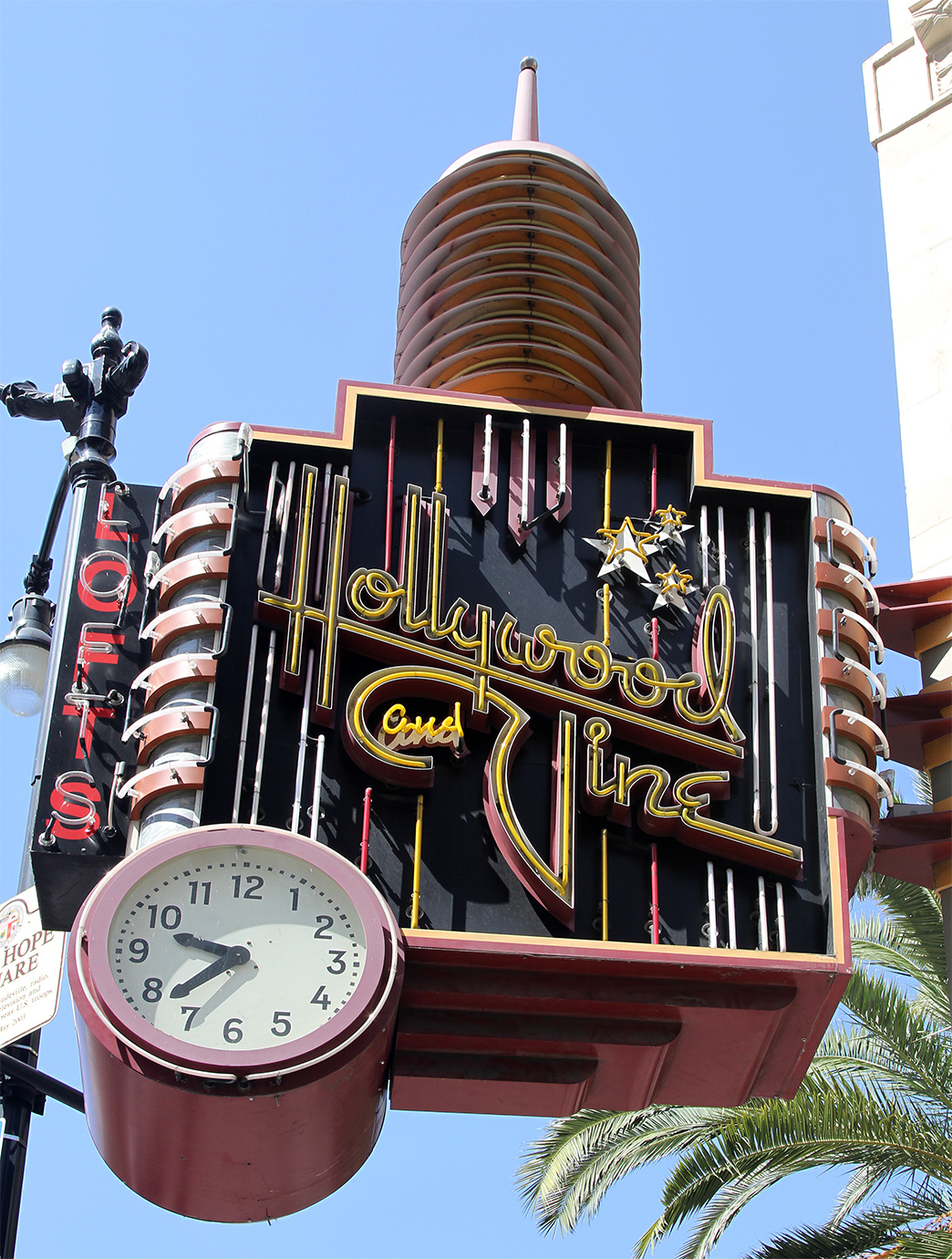
- Neon sign for The Lofts at Hollywood and Vine, a condominium on the northeast corner of the intersection.
- Interactive map of Hollywood and Vine

Location
- Hollywood, Los Angeles
- Coordinates: 34°06′06″N 118°19′36″W
- Roads at junction: Hollywood Boulevard; Vine Street

Construction
- Type: Intersection
- Opened: 1887 (as Prospect and Weyse); 1910 (as Hollywood and Vine)
- Maintained by: City of Los Angeles Department of Public Works

Hollywood and Vine, the intersection of Hollywood Boulevard and Vine Street in Hollywood, California, became known in the 1920s for its concentration of radio and movie-related businesses. The Hollywood Walk of Fame is centered on the intersection.

== History ==
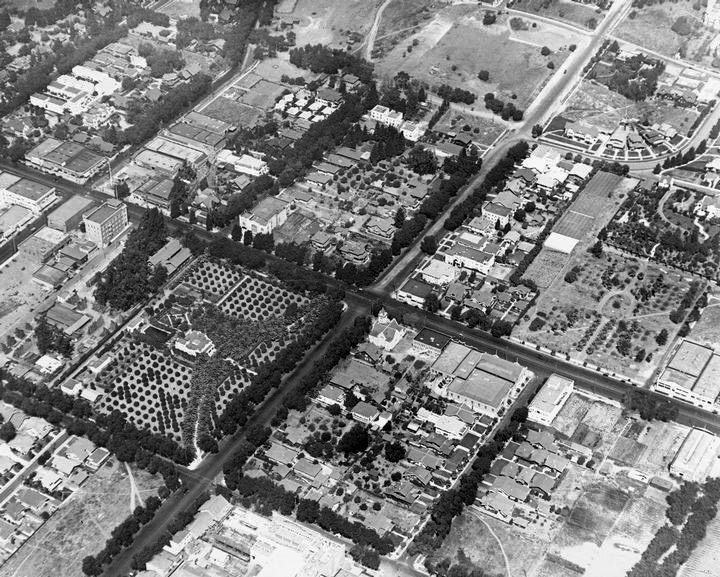
Aerial view of Hollywood and Vine, 1920

The area was a lemon grove until 1903, when Daeida Beveridge allowed one corner of the dirt intersection on her property to be used for the Hollywood Memorial Church. The streets were renamed in 1910, when the city of Hollywood was annexed into Los Angeles.

Beginning in the 1920s, during the Golden Age of Hollywood, the area began to see an influx of money and influence as movie and music businesses moved to the district, turning the local farms and orchards into movie backlots. Hollywood and Vine was the second busiest intersection in Los Angeles, after Wilshire Boulevard and Western Avenue. In the 1930s, radio station KFWB spoke of "broadcasting live from Hollywood and Vine," and newspaper columnists Hedda Hopper and Jimmie Fidler regularly touted the intersection's mystique.

In 1960, the intersection became the crossing point of the newly installed t-shaped Hollywood Walk of Fame. Later, when Neil Armstrong, Buzz Aldrin and Michael Collins were added to the Walk, their shared markers were placed at all four corners of Hollywood and Vine.

By the 1960s, many studios and broadcasters had moved onto more upscale areas, and this area fell into disrepair. Many offices and stores were abandoned, while the streets were occupied by squatters and panhandlers. It took several decades for redevelopment to take hold, and tourists were often surprised by the area's contrast with other tourist destinations.

The Hollywood/Vine subway station opened in 1999 and led to more sustained redevelopment in the area. On May 29, 2003, Hollywood and Vine was named "Bob Hope Square" to commemorate Hope's 100th birthday. A pedestrian scramble was added to the intersection in 2018.

A number of high-profile projects have attempted to restore the lost luster of the area, most notably the $600 million W Hollywood Hotel and Residences, which opened in 2010. Other large projects include a $50-million conversion of the Equitable Building and $70-million conversion of the Dyas Building into condominiums.

== Buildings ==
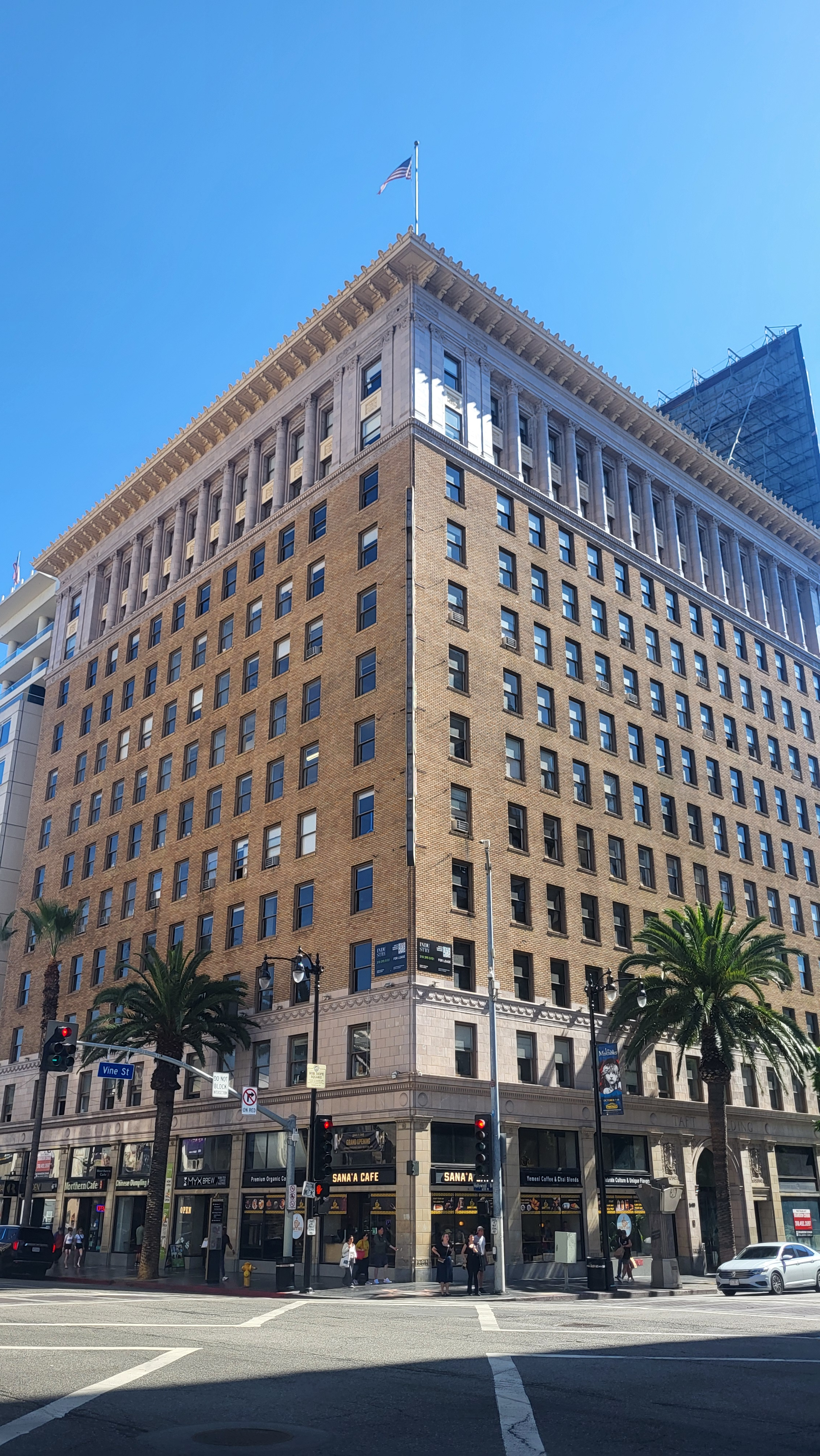
Taft Building

Hollywood and Vine's first major building, located on the intersection's southeast corner, was Hollywood Memorial Church, constructed in 1903. It was later torn down to make way for the intersection's first high rise, the 12-story Taft Building, built in 1923. The Taft Building was built in the Renaissance Revival style for A.Z. Taft Jr. by Walker & Eisen. In Hollywood's golden age, every studio as well as Charlie Chaplin, Will Rogers, and the Academy of Motion Picture Arts and Sciences had offices in the building. To the south of the Taft Building is the Spanish Colonial Revival Herman Building and south of that was the complementary-designed Hollywood Brown Derby, which housed Satyr Book Shop and the namesake restaurant and was demolished in 1994. To the east of the Taft Building was the Châteauesque Gilbert Books Building, former home of Gilbert Books, which was demolished to make way for the W Hollywood Hotel and Residences.

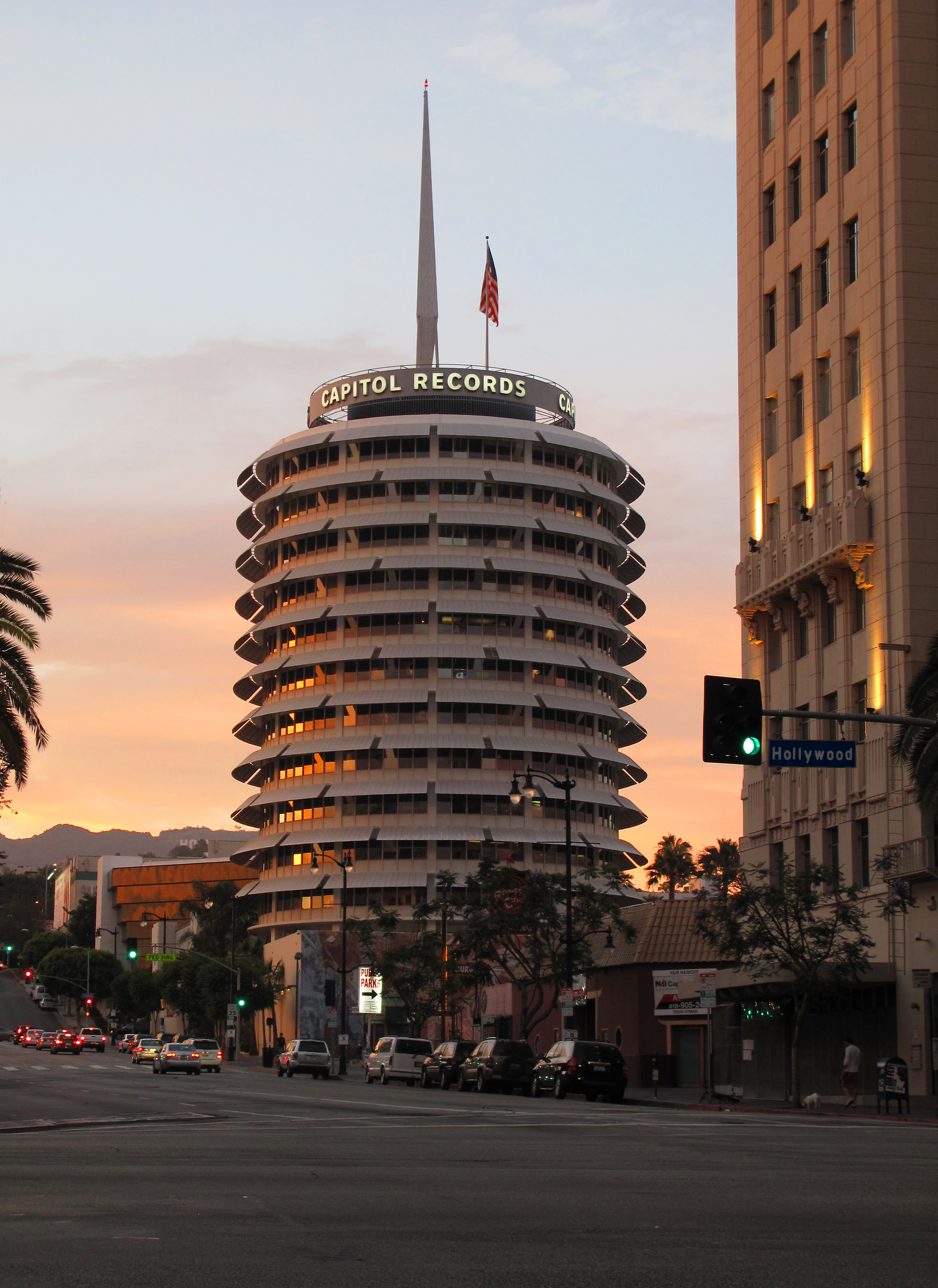
Capitol Records Building

On the northeast corner, the Equitable Building of Hollywood was designed by Aleck Curlett, built in 1929, and expanded in 1931. Originally home to numerous talent and advertising agencies, it was converted to a condominium in 2007. East of the Equitable Building is the Art Deco Hollywood Pantages Theatre, designed by B. Marcus Priteca and built as a movie palace in 1930 before being converted to a live theater in 1977; the building has also housed Frolic Room since 1934. North of the Equitable Building is the Welton Becket designed, Googie-styled Capitol Records Building. Built in 1956, the Capitol Records Building is the world's first circular office building and was home to the first record label on the west coast of the United States.

On the northwest corner, the Laemmle Building was built in 1932 by Richard Neutra for Carl Laemmle, head of Universal Pictures. The original design was not built because of the 1929 stock market crash, and the building was significantly altered many times. The building was gutted by fire in April 2008 and razed six months later. To the west is the former site of Sardi's Diner and current home of Cave Theater. Further west is Vine Theatre. To the north of the former Laemmle Building was the site of Hollywood Post Office, which was vacated in 1988 and demolished soon after. North of that is the Spanish Colonial Revival Avalon Hollywood, which was designed by Gogerty and Weyl and opened in 1927. Avalon Hollywood has been known by many times over its history.

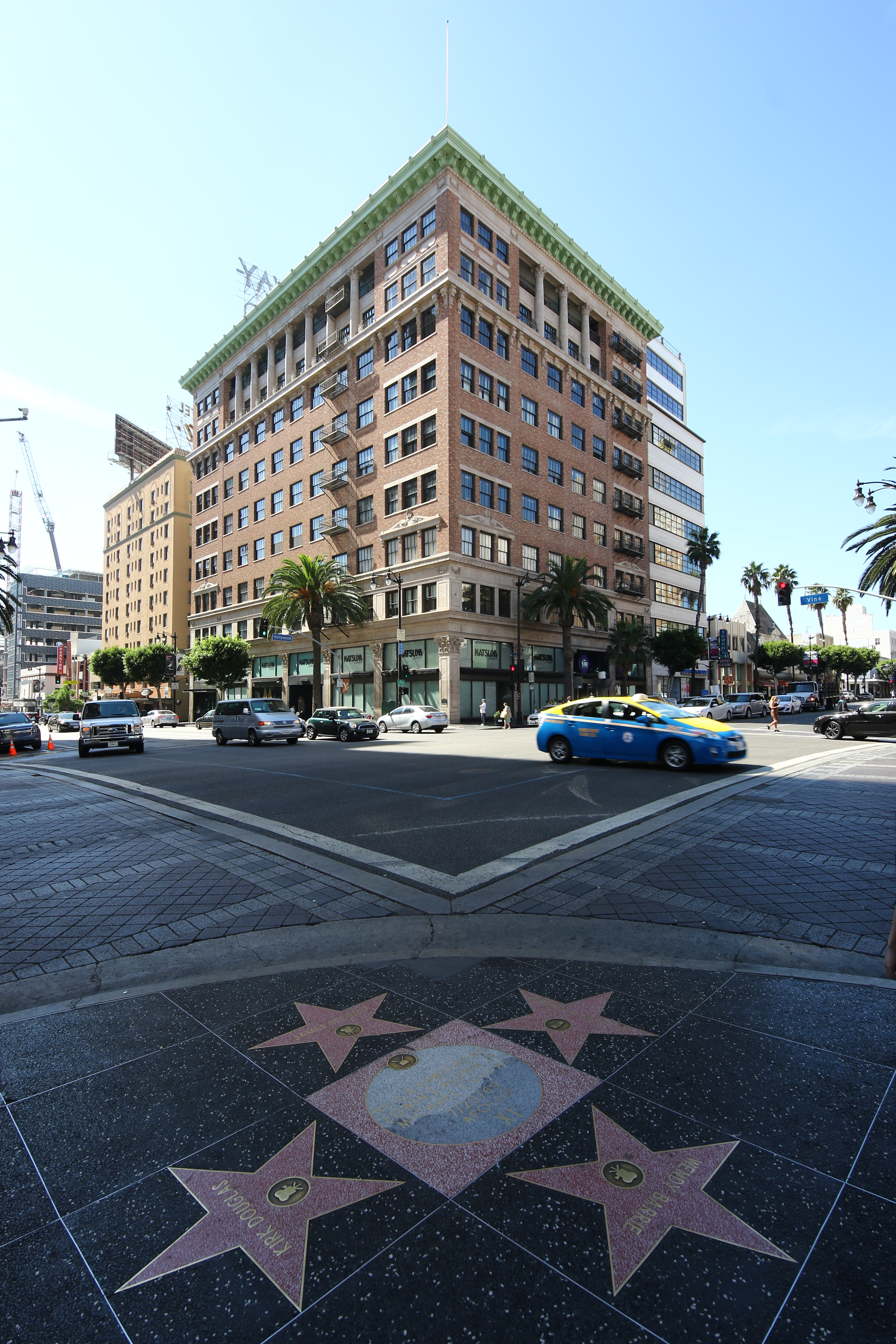
Dyas Building and the Hollywood Walk of Fame

On the southwest corner, the Dyas Building was built in 1927 by Frederick Rice Dorn. From 1931 to 1982, the building housed The Broadway-Hollywood department store, and in 2007 the building converted to multi-family residential, ground-floor commercial. The Dyas Building has two annexes, one to the south of the building and the other to the west, that were built in the late 1930s. South of the building is the Hollywood Plaza Hotel, built by Walker & Eisen in 1924 and at one point home to silent film star Clara Bow's "It Cafe".

Six of the aforementioned buildings are listed as Los Angeles Historic-Cultural Monuments:

- Hollywood Pantages Theatre (No. 193)
- Broadway Hollywood Building (No. 664)
- Hollywood Plaza Hotel (No. 665)
- Taft Building (No. 666)
- Capitol Records Building (No. 857)
- Equitable Building (No. 1088)

Furthermore, nine of the aforementioned buildings are listed as contributing properties in the Hollywood Boulevard Commercial and Entertainment District:

- Hollywood Pantages Theatre
- Broadway Hollywood Building
- Hollywood Plaza Hotel
- Taft Building
- Equitable Building
- Hollywood Playhouse
- Herman Building
- Gilbert Books
- Hollywood Brown Derby

In urban folklore, many of these buildings are considered to be part of "Haunted Hollywood", home to the ghosts of celebrities (and less stellar residents) of Hollywood's legendary past.

== In popular culture ==
The intersection has been mentioned or alluded to in dozens of songs, films, video games, music videos, and other popular media, often as a symbol of the area's lure for dreamers and for its decadence and disappointments.
