= Broadway Hollywood Building =

Commercial building in Los Angeles, California

- U.S. Historic district – Contributing property
- Los Angeles Historic-Cultural Monument
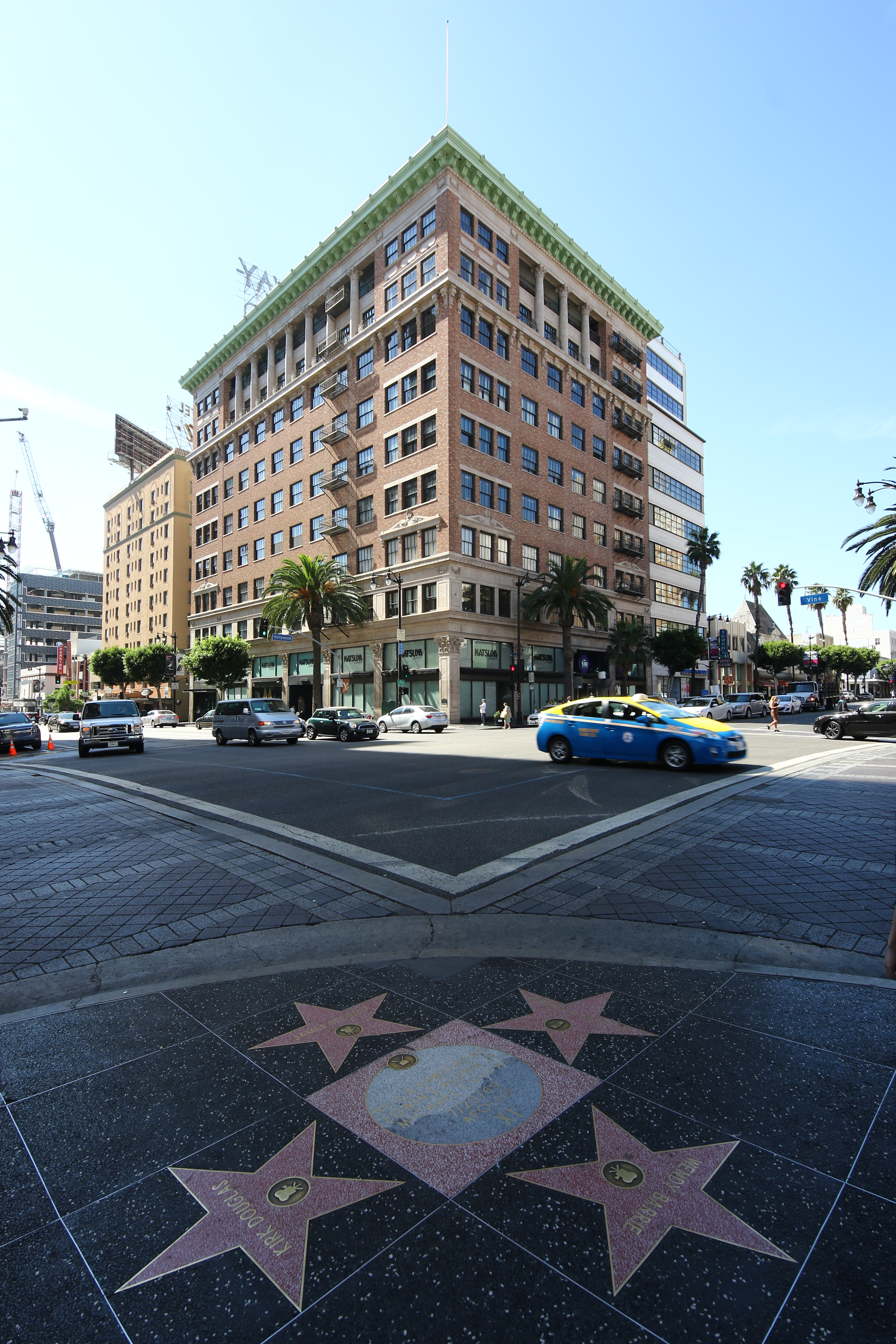
- The Broadway Hollywood Building viewed from the northeast corner of Hollywood and Vine

- Location within the Los Angeles metropolitan area
- Location: 6300 Hollywood Boulevard or 1645 Vine Street, Hollywood, California
- Coordinates: 34.1014324°N 118.3270755°W
- Built: 1928, 1938
- Architect: Frederick Rice Dorn (1928), John and Donald Parkinson (1938)
- Architectural style: classical revival
- Part of: Hollywood Boulevard Commercial and Entertainment District (ID85000704)
- LAHCM No.: 664

Significant dates
- Designated CP: April 4, 1985
- Designated LAHCM: September 29, 1999

Broadway Hollywood Building (sometimes Broadway Building or Broadway Department Store Building) is a building in Los Angeles' Hollywood district. The building is situated in the Hollywood Walk of Fame monument area on the southwest corner of the intersection referred to as Hollywood and Vine, marking the intersection of Hollywood Boulevard and Vine Street. It was originally built as the B. H. Dyas Building in 1927. The Broadway Hollywood Building is referred to by both its main address of 6300 Hollywood Boulevard and its side address of 1645 Vine Street.

Broadway Hollywood Building is a contributing property to the National Register of Historic Places U.S. Historic District-listed Hollywood Boulevard Commercial and Entertainment District. It has been listed as both a historic district contributing property and individually registered historic property by the city of Los Angeles and the state of California. The building has a neon sign above it that is considered notable and historic.

Broadway Hollywood Building was built as a department store, but has been refurbished as both commercial office space and residential condominiums. For several decades it hosted The Broadway. The building had an annex built to the west in 1939 and is also associated with the address 6316 Hollywood Boulevard. As a residential building, the building's units have had numerous famous owners.

== Details ==
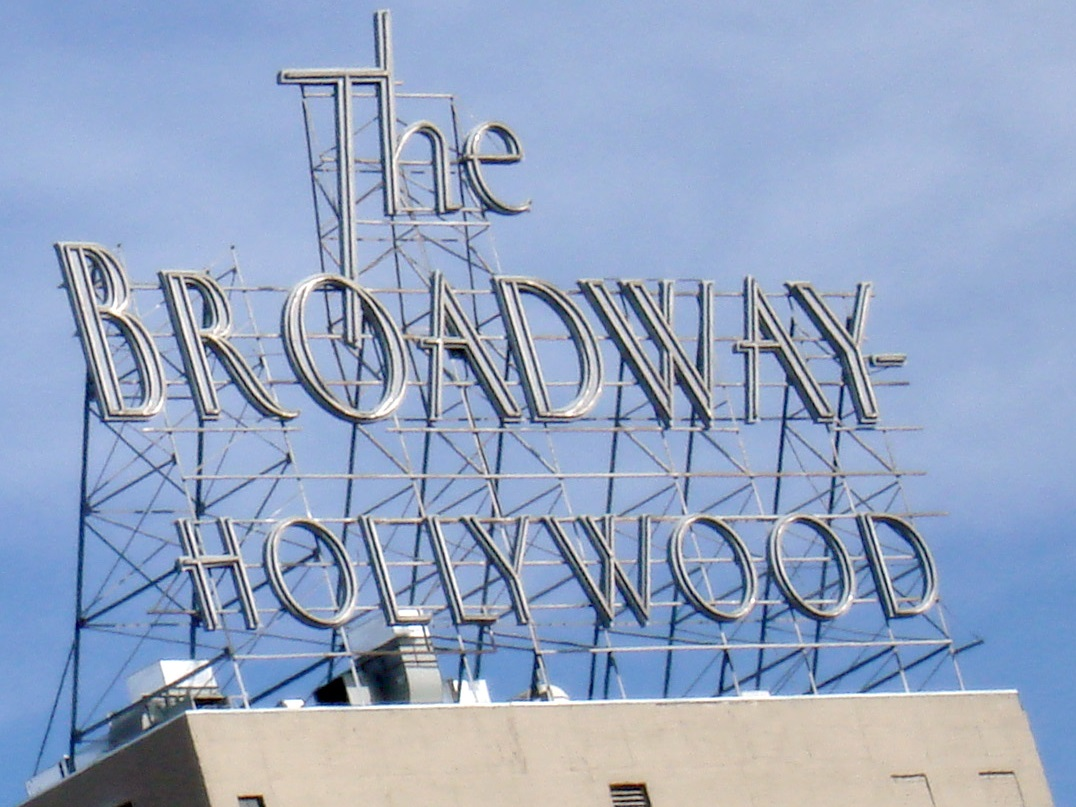
The metal neon sign atop the building

Although several sources describe the building as a ten-story building, the building is described as a nine-story building in the Hollywood Boulevard 1985 National Register of Historic Places nomination form. Atop the ten-story building is a two-story penthouse that serves as the base for the metal neon sign that says "The Broadway Hollywood". The original department store was designed by Frederick Rice Dorn in 1927 and its annex was designed by local architects John Parkinson and Donald B. Parkinson in 1938. It was originally built in the neoclassical architecture style from reinforced concrete with brick upper stories that, along with the street level, include the bulk of the detailing. Notable details include a classical entablature surmounts pilasters with Corinthian capitals, which result in what is described as a colonnade effect, which is repeated in the upper stories. The building is capped with a heavy cornice. The structure's highly ornamented facade includes decorative cornices and terra cotta pilasters. The top two stories has Corinthian-styled columns situated upon a projecting beltcourse.

Although sources describe the annex as eight storeys, the nomination calls it a "six story International Style addition". It is noted for banded windows and simple exterior. By the time of the nomination several showcase windows had been altered. According to the City of Los Angeles Office of Economic Development, the annex used "Streamline Moderne Style, characterized by the absence of ornamentation and an emphasis on smooth wall surfaces, rounded corners, flat roofs and linear elements that give a horizontal emphasis." The unifying exterior element between the original structure and its annex are the ground level colonnades.

=== Recognition ===
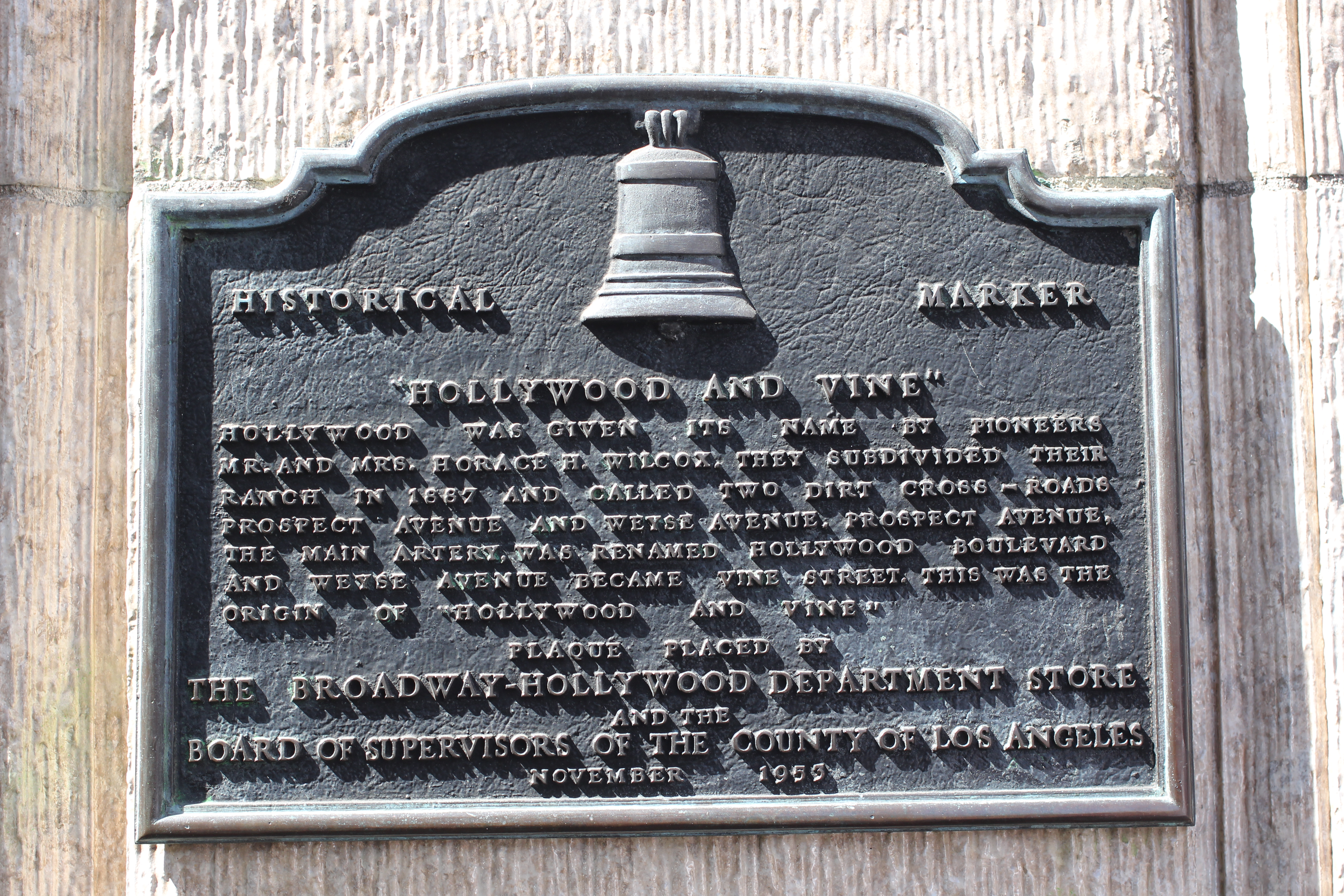
At the base of the building is a historical designation plaque for the Hollywood and Vine intersection

The building is included in the National Register of Historic Places U.S. Historic District-listed Hollywood Boulevard Commercial and Entertainment District, which covers from 6200–7000 Hollywood Boulevard, that was designated April 4, 1985. Both of the building's streetscapes—Hollywood Boulevard & Vine Street—are located within the City of Los Angeles Monument area LA-194 designated as the Hollywood Walk of Fame, which was designated July 5, 1978. The building and its neon sign were individually designated as a City monument (LA-664) on September 29, 1999. On April 4, 1985, the building and the entire Hollywood Blvd Commercial & Entertainment District were recognized by the California Office of Historic Preservation with status code 1D in designations 0053-4680-0054 and 0053-4680-9999, respectively. The building is covered by the Mills Act (Contract Number: 53175873 and Case Number: CHC-2005-5690-MA).

== History ==
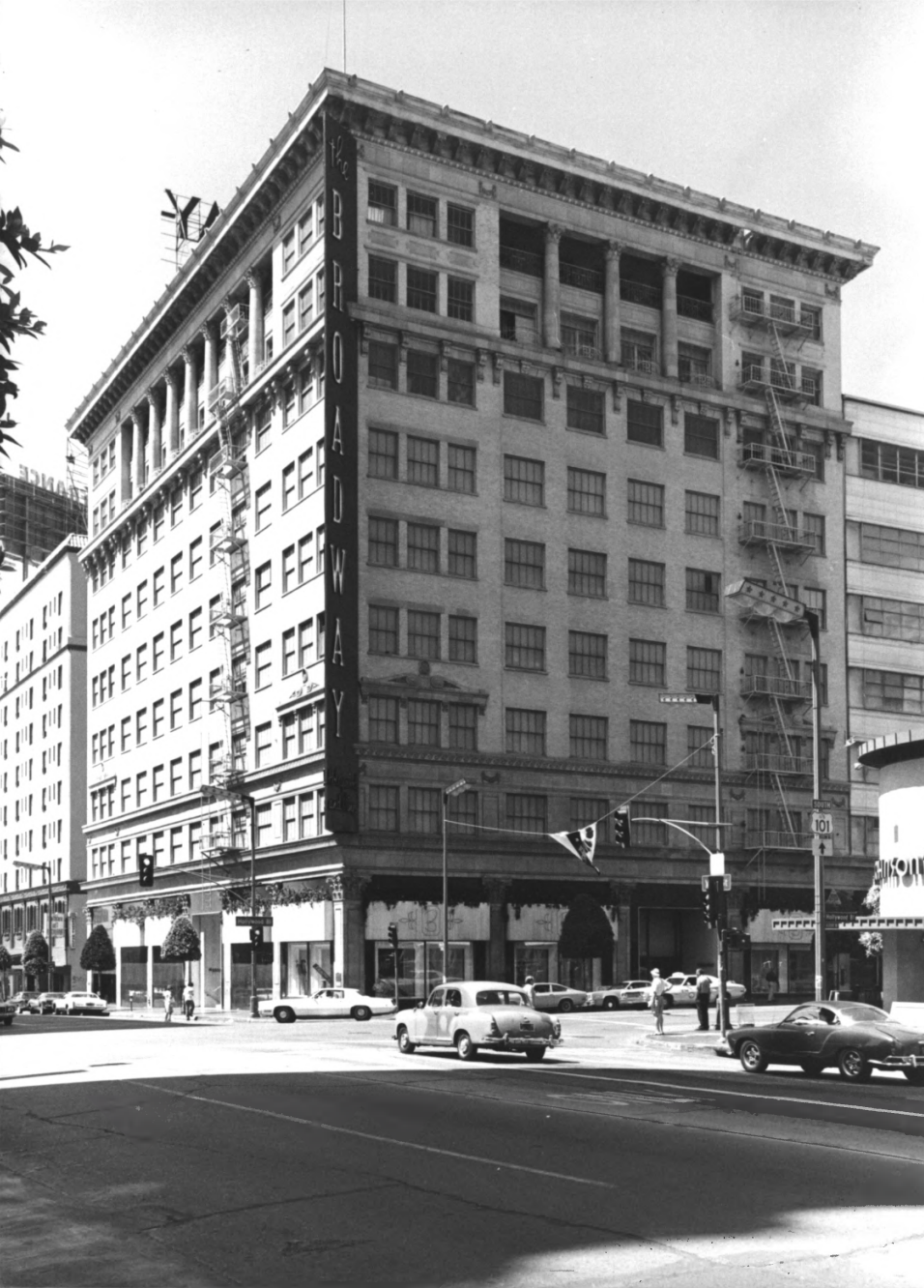
Broadway Hollywood Building from the north along Vine Street in 1980

In 1922, as Hollywood Boulevard regional shopping district, second only to Downtown Los Angeles, was taking form, stock was sold to finance construction of a four-story building at Hollywood and Vine to house a branch of Boadway Bros., a small Pasadena-based department store chain. Boadway’s went out of business in 1923, and B. H. Dyas agreed to open in the building instead.

In 1927, the Classical Revival Style building was built by local businessman Frank R. Strong as a B. H. Dyas Company Department Store. The construction, which continued into 1928, marked the first department store branch outside of the main Downtown Los Angeles central business district and led to similar large-scale commercial developments outside downtown. Due to the Great Depression, B. H. Dyas had to consolidate its operation back to its original store and The Broadway purchased the 30-year lease for this prime location for $2 million in 1931 ($42.3 million in 2025). The Broadway Hollywood Building quickly found its niche by serving the Hollywood's film and finance industries demand for high end products.

With the store's profits, it was able to expand in 1938 with 52,000 square feet (4,800 m^{2}) of retail space. In 1939, an eight-story modern annex designed by Parkinson and Parkinson was built immediately to the west. The Broadway Department Store served as a tenant until 1982, after which building was reconfigured for office use.

In 2005 and after having been vacant for many years, a renovation began to convert the 10-story building into 96 loft condominiums, while adding two floors to the annex. In July 2008, the residents sued the bar on the first floor of the building for its noise pollution, resulting in the relocation of the bar in February 2009. Among the current and past owners of the building's loft condominiums are Dave Navarro, Jason Statham, Danny Masterson, and Charlize Theron.

In 2016, the building was sold for $14.2 million ($19 million in 2025).

== In popular culture ==
Broadway Hollywood building was featured in Charlie Chaplin's Modern Times.

== See also ==
- List of Los Angeles Historic-Cultural Monuments in Hollywood
- List of contributing properties in the Hollywood Boulevard Commercial and Entertainment District
