= Tycoon (disambiguation) =

A tycoon is a business magnate, an entrepreneur of great influence or importance.

Tycoon may also refer to:

== Film ==
- Tycoon (1947 film), starring John Wayne
- Tycoon (2002 film), about Russian oligarchs

== Television ==
=== Episodes ===
- "Tycoon", a 1958 episode of African Patrol
- "The Tycoon", a 1959 episode of Hancock's Half Hour
- "The Tycoon", a 1960 episode of The Real McCoys
- "The Tycoon", a 1961 episode of The Flintstones
- "The Tycoon", a 1961 episode of Top Cat
- "The Tycoon", a 1971 episode of Gunsmoke
- "Tycoon" (Happy Hollidays), a 2009 episode
- "Tycoon", episode thirteen of Chicago Justice, 2017

=== Shows ===
- Tycoon (TV series), a 2007 reality series fronted by English entrepreneur Peter Jones
- The Tycoon (TV series), a 1960s American sitcom starring Walter Brennan
- Tycoon, a 2017 web series directed by Louis Leterrier later edited into a 2024 film with the same title

== Music ==
- Tycoon (band), a 1970s rock group
- Tycoon (musical), an English adaption of the French rock opera Starmania
- Tycoon, a 2012 album by No Trigger
- Tycoon (album), a 2025 album by Ty Dolla Sign

== Other media ==
- Tycoon (novel), by Harold Robbins (1997)
- Tycoon game or business simulation game, a genre of video games, including:
  - Tycoon (video game), a 1980 game for the TRS-80

== Other uses ==
- Daifugō, a Japanese card-shedding game, also known as Tycoon
- MV Tycoon, a cargo ship wrecked in 2012
- The Tycoon, a nickname for Abraham Lincoln, the 16th president of United States

== See also ==
- Taikun (大君), a Japanese term of Chinese extraction, the origin of the English word "tycoon"
- Ty Coon (1915–1992), American football player
