= The Carpetbaggers =

1961 bestselling novel by Harold Robbins

- First edition cover (publ. Trident Press)
- Author: Harold Robbins
- Publisher: Trident Press
- Publication date: January 1, 1961

The Carpetbaggers is a 1961 bestselling novel by Harold Robbins, which was adapted into a 1964 film of the same title. The prequel Nevada Smith (1966) was also based on a character in the novel.

In the United States, the term "carpetbagger" refers to an outsider relocating to exploit locals. It derives from postbellum Southern United States usage, where it referred specifically to opportunistic Northerners who flocked to the occupied southern states in hopes of increasing their political, financial and social power during the Reconstruction era. In Robbins' novel, the exploited territory is the film industry, and the newcomer is a wealthy heir to an industrial fortune who, like Howard Hughes, simultaneously pursued aviation and filmmaking avocations.

== Roman à clef ==
Ian Parker described the book as "a roman à clef — it was generally thought to have been inspired by the life of Howard Hughes". In an interview with Dick Lochte, Robbins said, "The airplane manufacturer in The Carpetbaggers was Bill Lear, not Howard Hughes, by the way." TV Guide Online's capsule summary of the movie says, however, "Deny it though he might, Harold Robbins obviously used parts of the life of Howard Hughes as the basis for his major character, Jonas Cord." Lear, the developer of the Lear jet and the 8-track tape player, was better known as an engineer rather than as an aviator, and had no connection with Hollywood.

Parallels between Cord and Hughes include:

- Cord is the heir to his father's Cord Explosives Company, Hughes to his father's Hughes Tool Company.
- Cord personally sets aviation records, as did Hughes.
- Much of the novel concerns itself with Cord's ventures into film production; Hughes produced 26 films.
- Cord owns an airline named ICA; Hughes owned TWA.
- Cord personally pilots a gigantic flying boat called the Centurion, "the biggest airplane ever built", to prove its airworthiness in order to meet a naval contract condition. Hughes personally piloted the Hughes H-4 Hercules or Spruce Goose, by some criteria the largest aircraft ever built, to prove its airworthiness in order to deflect Congressional criticism of his war contracts.

Ian Parker and others identify the character Rina Marlowe with Jean Harlow, whom Howard Hughes had under personal contract for a few years and who many believe had an affair with Hughes; although actual evidence of such an affair is patchy at best, and Harlow often complained about Hughes making a fortune loaning her to other studios and paying her a paltry salary (her contract with Hughes was eventually bought out by MGM). Carroll Baker, the actress who played Rina in The Carpetbaggers, was chosen a year later to play the title role in the biopic Harlow. Fictional Rina Marlowe's husband, cinema director Claude Dunbar, commits suicide shortly after their marriage, as did Jean Harlow's second husband, producer Paul Bern. Marlowe dies tragically of encephalitis in about 1934; Harlow died of kidney failure in 1937.

In other respects, correspondences between the novel's characters and real individuals are imprecise. In the novel, Jonas Cord's first movie production is entitled The Renegade; is released in 1930; and stars Rina Marlowe in her screen debut. Marlowe has a 38C bust, and Cord has one of his aeronautical engineers design a special brassiere for her. There is a brief reference to his producing a movie four years later entitled Devils in the Sky. These movie titles bear an unmistakable similarity to two movies produced and directed by Hughes: The Outlaw (1943) and Hell's Angels (1930).

Hell's Angels starred Jean Harlow, but it was not her debut; she was an established actress with seventeen earlier screen credits. Jean Harlow was famous as (in the words of her official estate-sponsored website) "Hollywood's Original Blonde Bombshell", but her bust measurement was not extraordinary. The real-life person who did make her screen debut as a star, was famous for her large bust, and for whom Hughes really did have an engineer design a special brassiere, was Hughes' later discovery (and model for the character Jennie Denton) Jane Russell, who starred in The Outlaw.

The names of real people whom Robbins' fictional characters resemble are often mentioned briefly within the novel, potentially further confusing the situation. When Rina Marlowe dies, a studio official says that, to replace Marlowe in an upcoming picture, "I'm already talking to Metro about getting Jean Harlow." A fictional Charles Standhurst, who owns "more than twenty newspapers stretched across the nation", is said to be "second only to Hearst".

The character Nevada Smith is a cowboy who breaks into the movies by volunteering to perform a risky stunt, becomes fabulously wealthy as a movie cowboy star, and becomes proprietor of a Wild West show. In these details he bears a vague resemblance to Tom Mix, who was a star performer in the 101 Wild West Show and became in turn a movie extra, stuntman, and major star. Some also see a resemblance between Nevada Smith and William Boyd, who became famous as Hopalong Cassidy. Others say that Smith was based on cowboy actor Ken Maynard. A movie entitled Nevada Smith (1966) starring Steve McQueen was based on Smith's role in this book. The role of Billy the Kid in Hughes' The Outlaw was played by Jack Buetel, who prior to his movie career was neither an outlaw nor a cowboy, but an insurance clerk.

== Reviews ==
Murray Schumach's review in The New York Times on June 25, 1961, opens: "It was not quite proper to have printed The Carpetbaggers between covers of a book. It should have been inscribed on the walls of a public lavatory." He complains that the plot is merely "an excuse for a collection of monotonous episodes about normal and abnormal sex—and violence ranging from simple battery to gruesome varieties of murder".

On the day the review was published, The Carpetbaggers was already at number nine on the New York Times bestseller list. The most successful of Robbins' books, it had sold over eight million copies by 2004. The profile of Robbins in Gale's Contemporary Authors Online claims that The Carpetbaggers "is estimated to be the fourth most-read book in history".

== Artifact of the sexual revolution ==
The Carpetbaggers was published at the onset of the sexual revolution. Only two years earlier, the U.S. Postmaster General had banned D. H. Lawrence's Lady Chatterley's Lover from the mails as obscene. In 1960, publisher Grove Press won the Supreme Court case contesting the ban, but even in 1961 booksellers all over the country were sued for selling Henry Miller's Tropic of Cancer. Parker quotes a professor of English as saying "The Carpetbaggers could have sent any retailer handling it to prison before 1960."

The Carpetbaggers never landed in court, but it did vigorously (and profitably) exploit the territory that Grove Press had opened up. On the second page of the novel, as aviator Jonas Cord approaches the landing strip of his father's explosives factory, Robbins writes: "The black roof of the plant lay on the white sand like a girl on the white sheets of a bed, the dark pubic patch of her whispering its invitation into the dimness of the night." In 1961, this was explosive indeed. (Paradoxically, the words "pubic patch" are omitted in some recent editions published in the United Kingdom.)

In 1963, while it may have been just within bounds in the United States, it was still one of 188 books prohibited from import into Australia, along with Vladimir Nabokov's Lolita, D. H. Lawrence's Lady Chatterley's Lover, Grace Metalious's Peyton Place, and no fewer than seven books by Henry Miller.

== In popular culture ==
In the film The Fortune Cookie (1966), Harry Hinkle (Jack Lemmon) carries a hardcover copy of the novel into his bedroom. Insurance investigators are covertly listening. In the novel The Outsiders (1967), Ponyboy Curtis mentions that his elder brother Darry has a copy of the novel, which Ponyboy states he has read, despite Darry saying he is too young.
