= The Dream Merchants (miniseries) =

- Genre: Miniseries/Drama
- Based on: The Dream Merchants by Harold Robbins
- Screenplay by: Richard De Roy; Chester Krumholz
- Story by: Harold Robbins
- Directed by: Vincent Sherman
- Starring: Mark Harmon; Vincent Gardenia
- Theme music composer: George Duning
- Country of origin: United States
- Original language: English
- No. of episodes: 2 x 120 mins

Production
- Producer: Hugh Benson
- Cinematography: Gerald Perry Finnerman
- Editors: Donald Douglas; Richard Van Enger Jr.

Original release
- Network: Operation Prime Time
- Release: May 12, 1980 – 1980

The Dream Merchants is a 1980 television miniseries based on the 1949 novel of the same name by Harold Robbins and directed by Vincent Sherman.

The Dream Merchants tells the rags to riches story of a young man (Mark Harmon) who starts his career working in a nickelodeon theatre and builds a movie empire during the silent film era until the advent of sound films in the late 1920s.

== Plot ==
=== Part 1 ===
Albany, 1912. Johnny Edge (Mark Harmon) offers his final nickel to watch a moving picture in the nickelodeon theater run by 47-year-old Peter Kessler (Vincent Gardenia). Peter is contractually obligated to show pictures made by The Combine, currently the leading film production company in New York state. Peter believes in the potential of moving pictures but agrees that the productions by The Combine are a cheap novelty, and continuously breaks contract to show the pictures he prefers. Johnny shares Peter's passion for the film industry and lands a job at his theatre selling candy. Soon, Peter's profit doubles and he agrees to Johnny's plan to make their own pictures. They visit New York City and meet with The Combine's studio boss Charles Slade (Howard Duff). Here, they learn that making pictures requires an expensive license, which prompts them to sell the nickelodeon theater to associate George Pappas (José Ferrer). Meanwhile, at the lot Johnny meets and falls in love with Dulcie Warren (Morgan Fairchild), a film extra with ambitions of becoming a film star.

With the money earned from selling the nickelodeon theater, Peter acquires the license and establishes his own film production company, Magnum Studio, granting Johnny 10% of the shares. They steadily produce two-reel pictures, and although satisfied with their results, have high hopes of producing a six-reel feature. Slade considers six reels too long and does not grant them permission. Enraged, Peter and Johnny move to California to produce films freely without the intervention of The Combine. They are accompanied by Dulcie, film director Conrad Stillman (Fernando Lamas), as well as Dulcie's cousin Craig Warren (Robert Goulet) and his co-star Astrid James (Morgan Brittany). Also joining are Peter's family, consisting of his loyal wife Esther (Kaye Ballard), his rebellious son Mark (Robert Picardo) who dreamt of becoming a car engineer but is pressured into film directing by his father, and the young Doris (Brianne Leary), who is secretly in love with Johnny. While producing their first feature film in California, Craig, the male lead and a Broadway star, makes impossible requests. Fed up with his behaviour, Peter replaces him with a Californian cowboy Zack Larsen (Chris Robinson). The film becomes a smash hit and puts Magnum Studio on the map, yet Slade vows revenge on Peter for going behind his back producing the film. Johnny, meanwhile, develops a serious relationship with Dulcie and proposes marriage.

By 1917 in Hollywood, Magnum Studio is producing one feature film after the other, and Dulcie's career is taking off. When she finds out that she is expecting a child, she fears that the pregnancy will end her career and undergoes an abortion without informing Johnny. He is enraged after finding this out and leaves her. Devastated, he enlists the Great War. Two years later, he returns to Hollywood and finds out that Magnum Studio is now co-run by Henry Farnum (Robert Culp), a former associate of Slade with a commercial mindset. Johnny is not a fan of Farnum and blames Peter for selling out. Before long, Johnny falls in love with a now mature Doris, and they marry. This upsets Dulcie, who expected Johnny to eventually take her back. In spite, she agrees to marry Mark, who always hated Johnny and developed a strong sense of rivalry with him. Peter is furious when he finds out about Mark and Dulcie's marriage: he rejects Mark as his son and fires Dulcie from the studio. As Johnny goes off on his honeymoon with Doris, Dulcie vows revenge on Johnny.

=== Part 2 ===
Hollywood, 1926. Talking pictures are the latest fad in Hollywood, but Peter is not interested in making the transition. Instead, he spends most of the studio's budget on the silent film The Flapper, which stars Astrid and is directed by Stillman who secretly has an affair during production. When Stillman's wife Helene (Dorit Stevens) finds out, she shoots and kills both of them. Johnny refuses to cancel the project and, to everyone's surprise, recasts the lead role with Dulcie, who in previous years has been working as an actress in Paris. Meanwhile, Peter keeps spending recklessly on lavish silent productions, which upsets most of the executives at the studio. Farnum informs his former boss Slade about Magnum Studio's vulnerability, and they design a scheme to overthrow Peter. Slade and Farnum attempt to involve Johnny in the scheme, offering him the presidency. Rather than taking the offer, Johnny uses it as a threat against Peter to stop his reckless spending. The pressure at work puts a strain on his marriage with Doris, and before long Johnny begins an affair with Dulcie.

One day, Johnny and Doris’ son Bobby (Seth Wagerman) falls from a horse and fractures his skull. The event prompts Johnny to reconsider his life choices, following which he ends his affair with Dulcie, who vows revenge. The next morning, Peter receives candid photos of Johnny and Dulcie kissing. Feeling betrayed, he blacklists Johnny and threatens to end Dulcie's career unless she keeps quiet about the affair and temporarily quits working to give Mark a child. Dulcie refuses to live this lifestyle and tells Mark that she will leave him to move back to Paris. They get into a fight over her choice and get into a car accident, killing both of them. Johnny, meanwhile, confesses the affair to Doris. She feels betrayed, especially considering that she had plenty of opportunities to start an affair with her admirer Zack but rejected him out of loyalty to her husband. Before long, Doris leaves Johnny.

Slade and Farnum's scheme to take over Magnum Studio continues, with help from Lawrence Bradford (Ray Milland), an investor who gets hold of Peter's shares of the company in his bid to finance five more silent films. They vote Pappas out of the company, who just spent his final share of the studio on rewiring cinemas for talking pictures. Devastated, Pappas commits suicide in Farnum's office, which Bruce overhears. Slade, Farnum and Bradford cover up the suicide with help from Peter's assistant Vera (Carolyn Jones), who had been secretly scheming with Farnum against Peter for years. Next, they convince Johnny to run against Peter for the presidency of Magnum Studio. Bruce, who Johnny once helped covering up an affair with an extra that threatened to ruin his career, now repays Johnny's favour by warning him of Bradford, Farnum and Slade's wrongdoings. Johnny finds out the three men were responsible for Pappas’ suicide and threatens to go to court unless they give up their company shares. After they do so, Johnny reinstates Peter in his position at the company, thereby restoring his relationship with Peter and Doris.

In the end, Peter announces his retirement and puts Johnny in charge as the president, offering to provide counsel to Johnny. Shortly after, Johnny's first talking picture goes into production.

== Cast ==
Starring

- Mark Harmon as Johnny Edge, an orphan with dreams of building his own film studio
- Vincent Gardenia as Peter Kessler, a German immigrant who runs a nickelodeon theater
- Morgan Fairchild as Dulcie Warren, a femme fatale and extra in two-reel shorts at The Combine with big dreams of becoming a movie star
- Brianne Leary as Doris Kessler, the unassuming youngest daughter of Peter and Esther who has a crush on Johnny
- Robert Picardo as Mark Kessler, the oldest son of Peter and Esther who wants to become a car mechanic
- Kaye Ballard as Esther Kessler, Peter's loyal wife

Guest stars

- Eve Arden as Coralee, a movie columnist, and one of the most well-connected people in Hollywood's high society
- Morgan Brittany as Astrid James, a star on Broadway who successfully transitions to silent film work
- Red Buttons as Bruce Benson, a comedic film actor for Magnum Studio who frequently holds affairs with young film extras despite being married
- Robert Culp as Henry Farnum, a film studio executive and the right-hand man of Charles Slade, with a very commercial mindset.
- Howard Duff as Charles Slade, the studio boss of The Combine who tries to ruin Peter Kessler out of business
- José Ferrer as George Pappas, a studio executive who owns many film theaters
- Robert Goulet as Craig Warren, Dulcie's cousin and a famous Broadway star with a difficult temper
- David Groh as Rocco Salvatore, Johnny's friend while serving the army during The Great War
- Carolyn Jones as Vera Montague, Peter's assistant at Magnum Studio secretly working for Farnum
- Fernando Lamas as Conrad Stillman, a well-respected film director working first for The Combine and later for Magnum Studio
- Ray Milland as Lawrence Radford, a wealthy businessman and movie investor secretly working for Slade and Farnum
- Jan Murray as Murray Tucker, a studio executive working for Magnum Studio
- Chris Robinson as Zack Larsen, cowboy-turned-actor who becomes a star for Magnum Studio and falls in love with Doris
