= Nevada Smith =

1966 film by Henry Hathaway

- DVD Cover
- Directed by: Henry Hathaway
- Screenplay by: John Michael Hayes
- Based on: Nevada Smith from The Carpetbaggers by Harold Robbins
- Produced by: Henry Hathaway
- Starring: Steve McQueen; Karl Malden; Brian Keith; Arthur Kennedy; Suzanne Pleshette; Raf Vallone; Janet Margolin; Howard da Silva; Pat Hingle; Martin Landau
- Cinematography: Lucien Ballard
- Edited by: Frank Bracht
- Music by: Alfred Newman
- Color process: Technicolor
- Production companies: Solar Productions; Embassy Pictures
- Distributed by: Paramount Pictures
- Release date: June 29, 1966
- Running time: 131 minutes
- Country: United States
- Language: English
- Box office: $6.5 million (est. US/ Canada rentals)

Nevada Smith is a 1966 American Western film directed by Henry Hathaway and starring Steve McQueen, Karl Malden, Brian Keith, Arthur Kennedy and Suzanne Pleshette. The film was made by Solar Productions in association with and released by Paramount Pictures.

The movie is a prequel to The Carpetbaggers, a highly successful film from two years earlier based on the 1961 Harold Robbins novel. In that film, Alan Ladd played an older version of Nevada Smith, the character McQueen plays in this film.

Nevada Smith depicts Smith's first meeting with another "Carpetbaggers" character, Jonas Cord Sr, and delves into Nevada Smith's background as summarized in a scene from the original film.

== Plot ==
In the 1890s American West, outlaws Bill Bowdre, Jesse Coe and Tom Fitch seek to rob Max's father of the gold they believe he has. When it becomes evident that there is none, they torture and brutally kill the white father and Kiowa mother of young Max Sand. Max sets out to avenge their deaths.

While traveling in the desert, Max uncovers a rusty old gun. Coming upon Jonas Cord, a traveling gunsmith, Max tries to rob him. Cord, recognizing that Max's revolver is non-functional, convinces Max he has failed. Max tells Cord about his vengeful journey. Cord, empathetic, shelters him and teaches him to shoot. Max hunts the killers, who have since separated. He tracks down Jesse Coe to Abilene, Texas. With help from Neesa, a Kiowa dance hall girl, he identifies and confronts Coe in a saloon. A knife fight ensues in a nearby corral. Coe is killed, but Max is severely wounded. Neesa takes him to her tribe's camp and nurses him back to health. Soon after, they become lovers.

Once recovered, Max continues his pursuit. He learns that Bowdre is in a prison camp located deep within Louisiana's swamps. Max deliberately commits a bank robbery to be sent to the same prison as Bowdre. Max persuades Bowdre to escape with him, planning to kill him in the swamp. Pilar, a local Cajun girl working in the rice fields near the convicts' camp, agrees to help Max. Unaware of Max's plan to kill Bowdre, she obtains a boat and navigates the trio through the swamp. The boat capsizes early on, and Pilar is bitten by a poisonous snake. Max kills Bowdre, but Pilar eventually succumbs to the venom of the snakebite.

Max has escaped and is now hunting Fitch, the last murderer. Still blinded by revenge, Max infiltrates Fitch's gang, calling himself Nevada Smith. Fitch knows Max Sand has killed Coe and Bowdre and is coming for him. Although Fitch accepts Nevada into the gang, he is wary. As the gang rides out to commit a gold-transport robbery, Max is spotted by Cord, who calls out his name. Max ignores him and the gang rides on. Fitch now suspects one of his men is Max. As the gang greedily scoops up the stolen gold, Max watches from a hill. Fitch, realizing Smith is actually Sand, grabs his share and flees. Max pursues him and corners him at a creek. Fitch tries shooting Sand while pretending to surrender, but Sand, faster, shoots Fitch's hand.

Fitch gives up and wants Max to quickly kill him. Max shoots Fitch several more times, inflicting painful but non-fatal wounds. As Fitch lies in the creek, bleeding profusely, Max demands Fitch beg for his life. Fitch calls Max a coward for refusing to kill him. Max decides Fitch is not worth killing and rides away as Fitch continues shouting at Max to kill him.

== Cast ==
- Steve McQueen as Max Sand, also known as Nevada Smith
- Karl Malden as Tom Fitch
- Brian Keith as Jonas Cord Sr
- Arthur Kennedy as Bill Bowdre
- Suzanne Pleshette as Pilar
- Raf Vallone as Father Zaccardi
- Janet Margolin as Neesa
- Pat Hingle as Big Foot
- Howard Da Silva as Warden
- Martin Landau as Jesse Coe
- Paul Fix as Sheriff Bonnell
- Gene Evans as Sam Sand
- Josephine Hutchinson as Mrs. Elvira McCanles
- John Doucette as Uncle Ben McCanles
- Val Avery as Buck Mason
- Sheldon Allman as Sheriff
- Lyle Bettger as Jack Rudabough
- Bert Freed as Quince
- David McLean as Romero
- Steve Mitchell as Buckshot
- Merritt Bohn as Riverboat pilot
- Sandy Kenyon as Bank clerk
- Ric Roman as Cipriano
- John Lawrence as Hogg
- Stanley Adams as Storekeeper
- George Mitchell as Paymaster
- John Litel as Doctor
- Ted de Corsia as Hudson, (the bartender)
- Joanna Moore as Angie Cole

== Production ==
The movie was produced and directed by Henry Hathaway, with Joseph E. Levine as executive producer, from a story and screenplay by John Michael Hayes, based on a character from Harold Robbins' 1961 novel The Carpetbaggers. The music is by Alfred Newman and the cinematography, shot in Eastmancolor and Panavision, by Lucien Ballard.

Nevada Smith was shot in approximately 46 different locations in the Inyo National Forest, in parts of Southern California and Southwestern Nevada, and in the Owens Valley of Southern California in the Eastern Sierra Mountains. The swamp scenes were filmed in Krotz Springs, Louisiana.

== Reception ==
On review aggregator Rotten Tomatoes, Nevada Smith holds a score of 50% based on 8 reviews, with an average rating of 6.1/10. Variety wrote that the film is "stifled by uneven acting, often lethargic direction, and awkward sensation-shock values", and that "overlength serves to dull the often spectacular production values".

== See also ==
- List of American films of 1966
