= Night of the Naked Dead =

2013 film

- Film poster
- Directed by: Junius Podrug
- Starring: Emma Gruttadauria; Joshua Koopman; Alexandra Creteau; Nick Apostolides; Carl S. Back; David Breski; Louis Cataldo; John Kelly; Zoe Markwalter
- Cinematography: John M. Kelly
- Release date: 3 December 2013
- Running time: 87 minutes
- Country: United States
- Language: English

Night of the Naked Dead is a 2013 American paranormal film written and directed by Junius Podrug. The film stars Emma Gruttadauria, Joshua Koopman, Alexandra Creteau, Nick Apostolides, and Carl S. Back in the lead roles.

The film was an Official Selection of the 2012 Killer Film Fest.

It is a micro-budget independent production that was released via DVD (including Netflix DVD), cable network VOD services, and Internet streaming on December 3, 2013.

== Plot ==
Emma (Emma Gruttadauria) is a financially strapped B&B owner on a small island off of Cape Cod. She is a romance writer whose books are not selling because they are not erotic enough. Besides the threat of losing the B&B to foreclosure, there is more aggravation in her life when she hires a handyman, David (Josh Koopman) to fix her plumbing and he breaks two things for everything he fixes. David is a traumatized vet living out of his derelict van. Despite his inept plumbing skills and her sharp tongue about his faults, David stirs Emma’s desires and she begins to fantasize about him, putting her sexual fantasies into the story she’s writing. The two become trapped in the B&B when a strange storm suddenly hits. The storm from Hell stirs awake the dead who rise naked in salt marshes by the house. While the dead are awakening, Jack (Carl Back), a crooked real estate developer, arrives at the B&B to foreclose. Among the newly awakened deceased is Veronica (Alexandra Creteau), a young runaway with dreams of being a Hollywood star. Veronica arrives nude at the B&B. On her heels also awakened in the marshes comes Coby (Nick Apostolides) a twisted killer. Coby arrives in a police uniform with blood on him and in pursuit of Veronica. They both appear to be normal human beings but Emma soon begins to realize that the strangers have come with secrets. The realization that there is something a bit strange about her guests turns to a sense of horror as she realizes that they are the living dead . . . and that sometimes the dead have unfinished business.

== Cast ==
- Emma Gruttadauria as Emma
- Joshua Koopman as David
- Alexandra Creteau as Veronica
- Nick Apostolides as Coby
- Carl Back as Jack
- Emma Jane Itri as Katie
- Diana Back as Mother
- Sallie Tighe as Anchor Woman
- Zoe Markwalter as News Reporter
- Norman Sylvia as Officer Sylvia
- David Breski as Monty
- Sarah Michelle as Living Dead Woman
- Lou Cataldo as Stranded Motorist
- Sail Earle Beithe as Living Man
- John Kelly as News Cameraman

== Production ==
Director Junius Podrug wrote the screenplay. His wife Hilde Podrug and writing partner Carol McCleary put the financing and production together. Hilde Podrug also acted as the Line Producer. The film is an independent production made on what the director describes as a micro-budget. It was shot over a twelve-day period in 2011 with some nondialogue B-roll shot in 2012. Over 95 percent of the film was shot in and around the Cape Cod 1772 historical house owned by the director, his wife, and Carol McCleary. Generally speaking, no one in the cast or crew had prior experience making a feature film. The director, Hilde Podrug, and Carol McCleary performed some crew tasks under assumed names and the name of characters from their books to create the appearance of a bigger production. John M. Kelly was the Director of Photography and Duncan Raymond was Cameraman. The film was shot with a Sony EX1 and EX3. Jay Sheehan of Garrett Audio was Production Sound Mixer.

== Release ==
The film was distributed by Maxim Media International through its Brain Damage Films division and Gravitas Ventures. The film was released December, 2013, on DVD and to Internet streaming and cable services.

In the first six months of 2016 the film drew in over three million views as a Kings of Horror YouTube presentation.

== Reception ==
The film received mixed reviews. There has been criticism for the fact that while there are “living dead” in the film, they are not traditional zombies. Reviewer Mike Habefelner stated “it's actually a pretty weird and inventive supernatural mystery, on a narrative level at least, and it features a bunch of pretty good performances. The movie just lets itself down a bit on the directorial level, it just seems too ... conventional.” A Horror Society review by Blacktooth stated “The acting in this one is surprisingly well done. The entire cast does a great job and that brings their characters to life . . . The story actually had potential to be one spooky and atmospheric ghost story but fell short when it tried to be a moody drama. Tom Gleba of NerdRemix.com called it a “very cool, very atmospheric movie with good performances.” He gave it a “firm 7 out of 10.” Michael Allen in a 28 Days Later Analysis said the film “is influenced by the phenom director Alfred Hitchcock and the supernatural sci-fi television series ‘X-Files.’”
