= Podrug =

Podrug is a Croatian surname. Notable people with the surname include:

- Emilija Podrug (born 1979), Croatian basketball player
- Junius Podrug (born 1947), American author and lawyer
- Milka Podrug-Kokotović (1930–2025), Croatian actress

== See also ==
- Prodrug
