= The Dream Merchants (novel) =

1949 novel by Harold Robbins

- First edition cover (Knopf)
- Author: Harold Robbins
- Language: English
- Publisher: Alfred A. Knopf
- Publication date: 1949
- LC Class: PZ3.R53564 Dr

The Dream Merchants is a 1949 novel by American author Harold Robbins. Set in the early 20th century, the book is a rags-to-riches story of a penniless young man who goes to Hollywood and builds a great film studio. A former Universal Studios employee, author Harold Robbins based the main character on Universal's founder, Carl Laemmle. With the Hollywood history in the backdrop, it is a love story.

In 1980, the book was made into a two-part miniseries, directed by Vincent Sherman.
