= A Stone for Danny Fisher =

1952 novel by Harold Robbins

- First edition
- Author: Harold Robbins
- Language: English
- Publisher: Alfred A. Knopf
- Publication date: 1952
- Publication place: United States
- Media type: Print (Hardback & Paperback)
- Pages: 317 pp (hardback edition)
- OCLC: 163578242
- Dewey Decimal: 813/.54 22
- LC Class: PS3568.O224 S698 2007

A Stone For Danny Fisher is a serious early novel by Harold Robbins that looks at the effect of the Great Depression on a lower-middle class Jewish family. Written in 1952, it is set in the period up to 1944.

== Plot summary ==
In the mid-1920s, a young Danny Fisher and his family move into a house in East Flatbush, Brooklyn. Within a few years, however, the Great Depression begins and Danny must use his one talent, boxing, as a means of supporting his family.

After a few years, the Fishers have lost their house and are living in a cramped apartment in the city. Danny continues to box, much against his father's wish, and dates a young Italian Catholic woman, Nellie Petito, much to the chagrin of his mother. Danny's boxing skills attract the attention of hoodlums, and he is offered a large sum of money to lose the Golden Gloves championship, a fight he could win easily and which would bring him professional fame as well as, he hopes, his father's acceptance.

Danny accepts the bribe but beats his opponent. After going on the run for two years in Coney Island, he returns to marry his sweetheart. Their early married life is marred by the death of their first-born child Vicky, in poverty.

Danny seeks out his former manager and goes into business with him as a black marketeer. Such activity brings him into contact with the very criminals he previously cheated.

The story concludes with Danny's death in counterpoint to arrival of new life.

The title is taken from the Jewish tradition of leaving a stone on the headstone when visiting a grave.

== Film adaptation ==
The novel was loosely adapted by Herbert Baker and Michael V. Gazzo into the 1958 movie King Creole, starring Elvis Presley, co-starring Walter Matthau and Carolyn Jones, and directed by Michael Curtiz.

The movie version hones in on the tension between the father, a cold, withdrawn figure and barely successful pharmacy employee and his son, a rebellious teenager whose failures in high school are largely a passive-aggressive response to his father, masking the need for the patriarch's approval.
