= John Michael Hayes =

American screenwriter

Hayes (right) with Alfred Hitchcock

John Michael Hayes (11 May 1919 – 19 November 2008) was an American screenwriter, who wrote four of Alfred Hitchcock's films in the 1950s.

== Early life and education ==
Hayes was born in Worcester, Massachusetts to John Michael Hayes Sr. and Ellen Mabel Hayes. Hayes Sr. was a tool and die maker but had performed as a song and dance man on the Keith-Orpheum vaudeville circuit earlier in life.

As a child, Hayes missed much of his school career from second grade through fifth grade due to ear infections. During that time away from school, he discovered a love of reading. In junior high school, he became a staff writer on The Spectator, the school newspaper, and at age 16, he wrote for the high school yearbook as well as editing a Boy Scout weekly, The Eagle Trail. His work brought him to the attention of Worcester's Evening Gazette, and Hayes began penning articles about Boy Scout activities for the paper.

Later stints with the Worcester Telegram and a profile in The Christian Science Monitor led to a job with the Associated Press. Working diligently, Hayes managed to amass enough money to attend Massachusetts State College.

== Career ==
=== Radio ===
At college, Hayes became interested in radio and won a contest to write radio stories for Crosley Corporation in Cincinnati, Ohio. Following his stint with the U.S. Army Special Services division during World War II, Hayes moved to California and resumed his radio career. In California, Hayes wrote for various radio comedies and dramas, including The Adventures of Sam Spade, Alias Jane Doe, Inner Sanctum Mysteries, My Favorite Husband, Sweeney and March, Suspense (radio drama), Twelve Players and Yours Truly, Johnny Dollar.

=== Films ===
His success in radio led to an invitation from Universal-International Pictures to write screenplays. His first screen credit was for Redball Express in 1952. Much of Hayes's career was spent writing screenplays for glossy, big-budget melodramas like Torch Song (1953) with Joan Crawford, BUtterfield 8 (1960) with Elizabeth Taylor, The Carpetbaggers (1964) with Carroll Baker, and Where Love Has Gone (1964) with Susan Hayward, Mike Connors and Bette Davis. His 1957 adaptation of Grace Metalious's steamy bestseller, Peyton Place, earned him an Academy Award nomination.

Hayes wrote the screenplays for four films directed by Alfred Hitchcock between 1954 to 1956: Rear Window (for which he won an Edgar Award and an Oscar nomination), To Catch a Thief, The Trouble with Harry and The Man Who Knew Too Much. Their first collaboration, Rear Window, is considered by many critics to be one of Hitchcock's best and most thrilling pictures. The Man Who Knew Too Much, a remake of Hitchcock's 1934 film of the same name, became one of the most financially successful films of its year of release. However, partway through production Hitchcock hired a second writer to assist on the project, and Hayes felt that the new hire contributed very little of substance to the finished product. When (on early pre-release prints) Hayes saw this second writer credited alongside him, he filed a credit arbitration case with the Writers Guild of America, which he won -- Hayes was given sole credit for the screenplay on all released copies of The Man Who Knew Too Much. Hitchcock seemed to view Hayes' arbitration filing as some sort of betrayal, and the two parted company forever after that film. Hayes immediately went on to great success with the Oscar-nominated screenplay for Peyton Place, and his career continued for many years after.

After several years of retirement, Hayes resurfaced to co-write director Charles Haid's family adventure drama Iron Will, starring Kevin Spacey, in 1994. He taught film writing at Dartmouth College until he retired in 2000.

In 2001, Hayes' collaboration with Alfred Hitchcock was the subject of the book Writing with Hitchcock by Steven DeRosa, which gave a full account of Hayes's four film collaboration with the director. In 2004, Hayes was the recipient of the Writers Guild of America's highest honor, the Screen Laurel Award. Hayes died of natural causes on November 19, 2008, in Hanover, New Hampshire. A movie based upon Writing with Hitchcock is currently in development and a new edition was published in 2011 containing additional material.

== Select filmography ==
- Thunder Bay (1953)
- Torch Song (1953)
- Rear Window (1954)
- To Catch a Thief (1955)
- The Trouble with Harry (1955)
- The Man Who Knew Too Much (1956)
- Peyton Place (1957)
- The Matchmaker (1958)
- But Not for Me (1959)
- BUtterfield 8 (1960)
- The Children's Hour (1961)
- The Chalk Garden (1964)
- The Carpetbaggers (1964)
- Harlow (1965)
- Nevada Smith (1966)
- Judith (1966)
- Winter Kill (1974)
- Pancho Barnes (1988)
- Iron Will (1994)

== Notes ==
- Green, Susan (1997). "John Michael Hayes: Qué Sera, Sera". Backstory 3 : interviews with screenwriters of the 1960s. Berkeley: University of California Press. p. 174-193.
