= Harlow (Paramount film) =

1965 film by Gordon Douglas

- Original theatrical poster
- Directed by: Gordon Douglas
- Screenplay by: John Michael Hayes
- Based on: Harlow: An Intimate Biography by Irving Shulman
- Produced by: Joseph E. Levine
- Starring: Carroll Baker; Martin Balsam; Red Buttons; Michael Connors; Angela Lansbury; Peter Lawford; Raf Vallone
- Cinematography: Joseph Ruttenberg
- Edited by: Frank Bracht; Archie Marshek
- Music by: Neal Hefti
- Production companies: Embassy Pictures; Promethemus Enterprises
- Distributed by: Paramount Pictures
- Release date: June 23, 1965
- Running time: 125 minutes
- Country: United States
- Language: English
- Budget: $2.5 million
- Box office: $3.4 million (US/Canada rentals)

Harlow is a 1965 American biographical drama film directed by Gordon Douglas about the life of film star Jean Harlow. It stars Carroll Baker in the title role and Raf Vallone, Red Buttons, Angela Lansbury, Peter Lawford, Mike Connors, Martin Balsam and Leslie Nielsen in supporting roles.

The film was produced by Joseph E. Levine, who announced the project in late 1964. Filming began in February 1965, concurrent with another Harlow biopic with the same title and subject, starring Carol Lynley and produced by Magna Corporation.

Harlow was distributed by Paramount Pictures, opening in June 1965, shortly after the release of the Magna biopic. Although the film failed commercially, it was successful in launching the hit song "Girl Talk" by Neal Hefti. Critical reaction was mixed, though Baker's portrayal of Harlow received praise, as well as the production values, sets, and cinematography. For his performance, Red Buttons received a nomination for Best Supporting Actor at the 23rd Golden Globe Awards.

== Plot ==
Jean Harlow is a struggling extra and bit actress supporting a greedy stepfather Marino and a loving but oblivious mother "Mama Jean". With the help of agent Arthur Landau, she secures a contract at the studio of the Howard Hughes-inspired Richard Manley. The reception to her first film is disappointing, and at Manley's studio her career is stalled.

When Manley attempts to add her to his list of seduced starlets, Harlow fights him off and tells him what she thinks of him. This scene turns out to be a ruse devised by her agent so that the now-furious Manley terminates her contract. Landau successfully pitches Harlow to Majestic Studios, and her career blossoms.

Despite studio encouragement to marry another contract star, Harlow marries the apparently gentle and cultured Paul Bern, who is revealed to be impotent. Soon after, Bern commits suicide. His death, combined with the stress of her career, leads Harlow on an odyssey of failed relationships and alcoholism, culminating in her death of pneumonia at the age of 26.

== Cast ==
- Carroll Baker as Jean Harlow
- Red Buttons as Arthur Landau
- Raf Vallone as Marino Bello
- Angela Lansbury as Mama Jean Bello
- Peter Lawford as Paul Bern
- Mike Connors as Jack Harrison (as Michael Connors)
- Martin Balsam as Everett Redman
- Leslie Nielsen as Richard Manley
- Mary Murphy as Sally Doane
- Hanna Landy as Beatrice Landau
- Peter Hansen as Assistant Director
- Kipp Hamilton as Marie Tanner
- Peter Leeds as Parker
- Sonny Liston as a fist fighter

== Production ==
=== Development ===
The concept of depicting Jean Harlow on film had originated in the 1950s. Many actresses were reported to have been cast as Harlow in different biopics, such as Cleo Moore for Columbia and Jayne Mansfield for Fox, but both of these projects fell through. In 1962, Fox announced that Marilyn Monroe would play Harlow in a lavish biopic under her new contract. However, after Monroe's death, the project was sold to Paramount, with Embassy Pictures producing and Carroll Baker starring in the title role. Producer Joseph E. Levine formally announced the production at the Beverly Hills Hotel on August 31, 1964.

Based in part on Irving Shulman's pulp biography Harlow: An Intimate Biography, Paramount's Harlow serves a melodramatic look at Harlow's life, focusing on her failed marriages. Levine had purchased the rights to the biography for $100,000. Prior to making Harlow, Carroll Baker had played a fictionalized version of Harlow dubbed "Rina Marlowe" in the smash-hit film The Carpetbaggers, starring George Peppard and Alan Ladd, which had also been produced by Joseph E. Levine and distributed by Paramount.

=== Casting ===
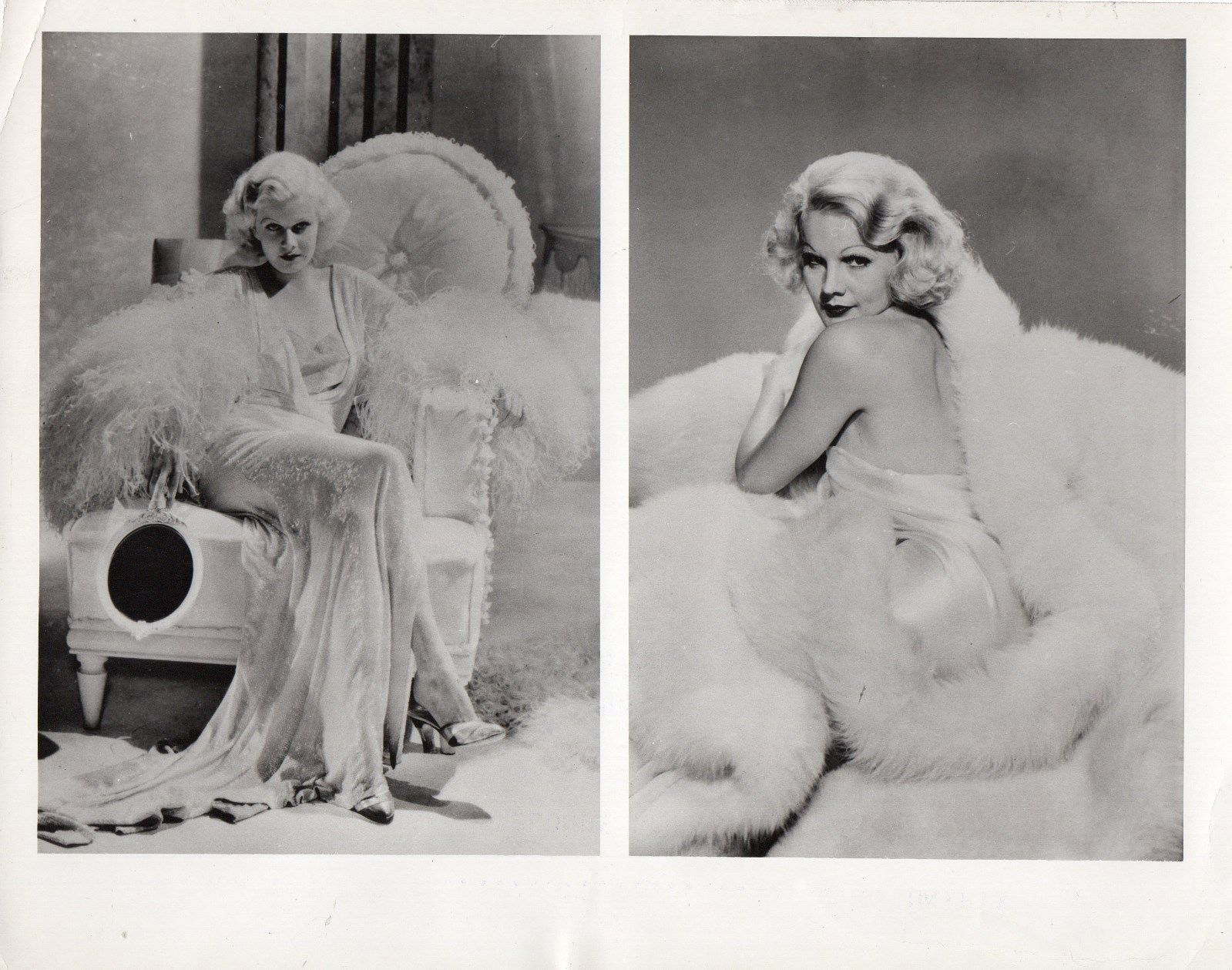
Press photo for the film comparing Jean Harlow (left) and Carroll Baker

At the time of her casting, actress Carroll Baker had been in the midst of an embittered feud with producer Joseph E. Levine, who also served as her manager. Baker had previously agreed to star in a Harlow biopic for Columbia Pictures, which enraged Levine, who had envisioned her for the role in his film. Because Baker had only agreed to the Columbia project verbally for then-studio head Jack Karp, her agreement was ultimately rendered invalid after Karp parted ways with Columbia. Additionally, Levine asserted that Baker's agreement with Columbia violated her contract with Paramount. Following this, the Columbia biopic was ultimately scrapped.

To appease Baker, Levine purchased her a platinum necklace with studded diamonds as a "peace offering" to convince her to take the role. Baker later commented: "[I was] ashamed to admit that I did enjoy holding it to the light and marveling at the beauty of those brilliant sparkling gems. I also hated myself for being so dazzled by it; for trading my self-esteem for bauble; and, ultimately, for propagating the myth that a woman indeed could be bought."

=== Filming ===
Principal photography of Harlow began on February 24, 1965, in Los Angeles. Some scenes were also filmed in Malibu. Director Gordon Douglas later said that during filming Baker "was very sick, physically and also mentally, I think. She was going through bad times. But she did a hell of a good job on the picture." Baker worked seven-day work weeks filming in order to complete filming so Paramount could meet their planned release date in June 1965.

Due to the time constraints, other actors in the film also committed extra time to expedite the production: Angela Lansbury regularly arrived on set two hours before she was scheduled to have her makeup applied, Red Buttons skipped daily lunch breaks, and Peter Lawford rehearsed with Baker late into the evenings for the follow day's scenes.

== Release ==
=== Marketing ===
Paramount devised a significant publicity campaign to promote the film at a cost of $150,000, which significantly distinguished it from the Magna film. Levine embarked on an "Operation Harlow" tour leading up to its release, making personal appearances, holding screenings for exhibitors as well as sneak previews and audience contests in hopes of generating interest in the film.

Harlow first premiered regionally on June 23, 1965. It had its New York City premiere on July 21, 1965, followed by a Los Angeles release on August 11, 1965.

=== Home media ===
On September 28, 2010, Olive Films released Harlow on Region 1 DVD in the United States. Olive reissued the film on Blu-ray on July 23, 2013.

== Reception ==
=== Box office ===
Harlow grossed $3.4 million in North American rentals between the United States and Canada.

=== Critical response ===
Variety called the film "handsomely mounted" and deemed Carroll Baker "a fairly reasonable facsimile" of Jean Harlow, while also praising the performances of Angela Lansbury and Raf Vallone. Dick Banks of The Charlotte Observer was critical of Peter Lawford's performance, though he compared it favorably against the Magna film and concluded that the film is "a credit to Carroll Baker as an actress." The Birmingham Post-Herald also felt it was a better film than the "quickie" Magna film, describing it as a "sumptuous Technicolor package" and praised it for its period details and performances.

Bruce Dunning of the Tampa Bay Times was less enthusiastic about the film, citing "unbelievable liberties taken with the facts of Harlow's life to the saccharine ending" and deeming Baker's portrayal as "sexless." Ben Kern of the Minnesota Star Tribune noted the film's simplifying elements of Harlow's life for dramatic effect, but conceded that "there is a technical excellence in [the] settings, properties, costumes and color." He also praised Baker's performance, noting that she "brings to the role sympathy, sincerity and her own beauty" and "doesn't try to imitate."

=== Accolades ===
Institution	Year	Category	Recipient	Result	Ref.
Golden Globe Awards	1966	Best Supporting Actor	Red Buttons	Nominated	

== See also ==
- List of American films of 1965

== Sources ==
- Bawden, James; Miller, Ron (2019). Conversations with Legendary Television Stars: Interviews from the First Fifty Years. Lexington, Kentucky: University Press of Kentucky. ISBN 978-0-813-17766-3.
- Davis, Ronald L. (2005). Just Making Movies. Jackson, Mississippi: University Press of Mississippi. ISBN 978-1-57806-690-2.
- Lisanti, Tom (2024) [2011]. Dueling Harlows: The Race to Bring the Actress's Life to the Silver Screen. Jefferson, North Carolina: McFarland & Company. ISBN 978-1-4-766-5166-8.
