= Red Buttons =

American comedian and actor (1919–2006)

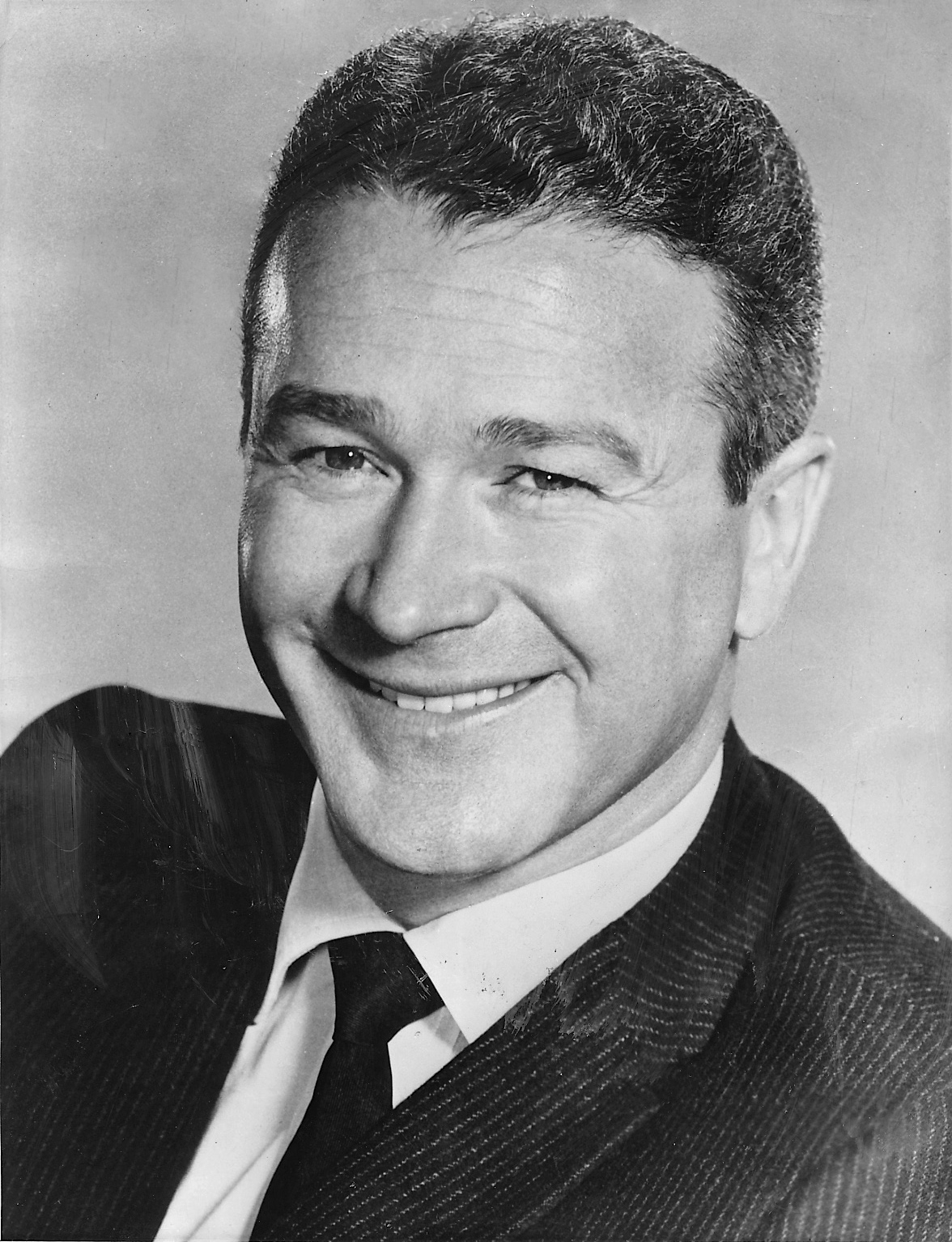
- Buttons in 1959
- Born: Aaron Chwatt; February 5, 1919; New York City, U.S.
- Died: July 13, 2006 (aged 87); Los Angeles, California, U.S.
- Occupations: Actor; comedian
- Years active: 1935–2006
- Spouses: Roxanne Arlen (m. 1947; div. 1949) Helayne McNorton (m. 1949; div. 1963) Alicia Prats (m. 1964; died 2001)
- Children: 2

Red Buttons (born Aaron Chwatt; February 5, 1919 – July 13, 2006) was an American actor and comedian. He came to national prominence as the eponymous star of television's The Red Buttons Show (1952–55), before winning an Academy Award and Golden Globe for Best Supporting Actor for his performance in the film Sayonara (1957).

He subsequently appeared in such films as The Longest Day (1962), Harlow (1965), They Shoot Horses, Don't They? (1969), The Poseidon Adventure (1972), and Pete's Dragon (1977), and starred on the series The Double Life of Henry Phyfe. From the 1970s, he was a familiar face on TV, with his "Never Got a Dinner" comedy monologues and his regular appearances on The Dean Martin Celebrity Roast.

During his career, he was nominated for two additional Golden Globes, as well as a Primetime Emmy Award, a BAFTA Award, and a Saturn Award. In 1960, Buttons received a Hollywood Walk of Fame Star.

== Early life ==
Red Buttons was born Aaron Chwatt on February 5, 1919, in Manhattan, New York, to Russo-Polish Jewish immigrants Sophie (née Baker) and Michael Chwatt. At 16 years old, Chwatt got a job as an entertaining bellhop at Ryan's Tavern in City Island, the Bronx, New York. The combination of his red hair and the large, shiny buttons on the bellhop uniforms inspired orchestra leader Charles "Dinty" Moore to call him "Red Buttons", the name under which he would later perform.

Later that same summer, Buttons worked on the Borscht Belt; his straight man was Robert Alda. Buttons was working at the Irvington Hotel in South Fallsburg, New York, when the master of ceremonies became incapacitated, and Buttons asked for the chance to replace him. In 1939, Buttons started working for Minsky's Burlesque; in 1941, José Ferrer chose Buttons to appear in a Broadway show The Admiral Had a Wife, a farce, set in Pearl Harbor at Oahu, Hawaii. It was due to open on December 8, 1941, but never did. It was deemed inappropriate after the Japanese attack on Pearl Harbor. In later years, Buttons would joke that the Japanese only attacked Pearl Harbor to keep him off Broadway.

== Career ==
In September 1942, Buttons made his Broadway debut in Vickie with Ferrer and Uta Hagen. Later that year, he appeared in the Minsky's show Wine, Women, and Song. This was the last classic burlesque show in New York City history; the La Guardia administration closed it down. Buttons was on stage when the show was raided.

Drafted into the United States Army Air Forces, Buttons in 1943 appeared in the Army Air Forces' Broadway show Winged Victory, along with several future stars, including Mario Lanza, John Forsythe, Karl Malden, and Lee J. Cobb. A year later, he appeared in Darryl F. Zanuck's movie version of the play, directed by George Cukor. Buttons also entertained troops in the European Theater in the same Jeep Show unit as Mickey Rooney.

After the war, Buttons continued to perform in Broadway shows. He also performed at Broadway movie houses with big bands. He appeared as himself, delivering a comic monologue, in the RKO Radio Pictures movie revue Footlight Varieties (1951).

=== The Red Buttons Show ===
In 1952, Buttons received his own television series, The Red Buttons Show, first seen on CBS and later on NBC. It was the number-11 show in prime time in 1952, and the comedian was extremely insistent on using fresh material. During the show's three-year-run, Buttons was notorious for his treatment of the writing staff, and comedy writers came and went regularly. As columnist Dorothy Kilgallen reported, "Three of Red Buttons' writers are ready to pack up and head for the booby hatch. The funnyman's temperament is just too exhausting to take. The trio of script writers have already announced they will not be part of the comedian's pending Hollywood movie assignment." TV Guide, noting the format changes of the show from variety to situation comedy, said his "status as a TV comedian has been going up-and-down like a yo-yo for the past two years... He reacted to the heady wine of success like a small boy locked inside a candy store. He went out and bought a powder-blue Cadillac. He picked up a mink coat for his wife. He moved his family into a terraced apartment on Manhattan's swank Sutton Place. Then he began to fool around with his scripts. 'That,' he says now in what may go down as one of the most remarkable understatements of our time, 'may well have been a mistake.'

As a result of these misadventures, Buttons' sponsor General Foods disowned him at the end of his run and CBS let it be known that Red was welcome to look for work someplace else." The magazine article carried a melancholy postscript: "P. S. It was in Hollywood that Red found the writers he got along with so well. They were Harry Clork, Larry Markes, Sumner Long, and Lester Lee. We regret having to use the past tense, but it seems that between the time the foregoing story was written a few weeks ago and the time we went to press, all but Lester Lee went thataway." Buttons admitted to the revolving door of writers: "The critics have kidded a lot about all the writers I've had, and I have had quite a few. I quit counting at 87. Most of them were good writers but they just weren't right for me." TV Guide critic Dan Jenkins offered a jaundiced opinion about the comedian's variable TV fortunes: "Buttons has no comic traits of his own. He is not funny per se. A Jack Benny can be hilarious just standing with his arms folded, staring at an old lady in the front row, Buttons can't. He needs material. Buttons, to this reviewer, has always been a club-date man. He was fleetingly sensational when he first appeared on television, but of all the media, TV is the one that most demands staying power -- a basic talent which can rise above material and carry its own weight on off-weeks. Buttons, thus far this season, has displayed very little of it."

In 1953, during his TV popularity, he recorded and had a two-sided hit with "Strange Things Are Happening"/"The Ho Ho Song", with both sides/songs essentially being the same.

=== New departure ===
His role in the film Sayonara (1957) was a dramatic departure from his previous work. In this film, co-starring with Marlon Brando, he played Joe Kelly, an American airman stationed in Kobe, Japan, during the Korean War, who marries Katsumi, a Japanese woman (played by Miyoshi Umeki), but he is barred from taking her back to the US. His moving portrayal of Kelly's calm resolve not to abandon the relationship, and the touching reassurance of Katsumi, impressed audiences and critics alike. Buttons won the Academy Award for Best Supporting Actor and Umeki won the Academy Award for Best Supporting Actress for the film.

After his Oscar-winning role, Buttons performed in numerous feature films, including the African adventure Hatari! with John Wayne and the adventure Five Weeks in a Balloon (1962) (where he received top billing). Buttons played the lead role of Private John Steele, the paratrooper hung up on the town steeple clock, in the 1962 international ensemble cast film The Longest Day. He was also prominent in the biopic Harlow, the disaster film The Poseidon Adventure, the dance-marathon drama They Shoot Horses, Don't They?, the family comedy Pete's Dragon, the disaster film When Time Ran Out with Paul Newman, and the age-reversal comedy 18 Again! with George Burns.

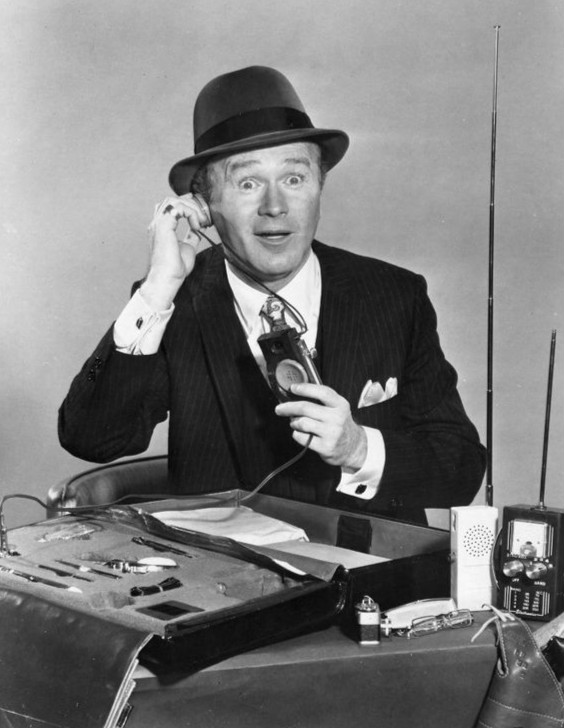
Buttons as Henry Phyfe

In 1966, Buttons again starred in his own TV series, a spy spoof called The Double Life of Henry Phyfe, which ran for one season. Buttons also made guest appearances on several TV programs, including The Eleventh Hour, Little House on the Prairie, It's Garry Shandling's Show, Knots Landing, The Cosby Show, and Roseanne. His last TV role was in ER.

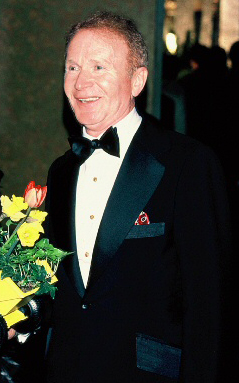
Buttons in 1978

=== "Never Got a Dinner" ===
Beginning in the 1970s Red Buttons enjoyed a new popularity with his "Never Got a Dinner" routine, a standard of the Friars Club and The Dean Martin Celebrity Roast for many years. "Never got a dinner!" became a catchphrase, and formed the basis for elaborately eccentric lists of famous people (and their wives and mothers) who had not been honored with celebrity dinner roasts: "Why are we here honoring this man? Why is he getting a dinner? I can think of many famous people who never got a dinner. Mrs. Ponce De Leon, who said to her husband Ponce, 'You're going to Miami without me again this year?'... never got a dinner!"

Another of his catchphrases was "I did not come here to be made sport of," which was later taken up by radio talk-show host Howie Carr.

He made numerous appearances at Chabad telethons, where he was often brought on and off stage to the tune of "Hava Nagila". (He once told an interviewer, "I'm a Jew who is doing comedy, not a 'Jewish comic'.")

== Honors ==
Buttons received a star on the Hollywood Walk of Fame for television, located at 1651 Vine Street.

He was ranked number 71 on Comedy Central's list of the 100 Greatest Stand-Ups of All Time.

== Personal life ==
Buttons married actress Roxanne Arlen in 1947, but the marriage soon ended in divorce. He married Helayne McNorton on December 8, 1949. They divorced in 1963. His last marriage was to Alicia Prats, which lasted from January 27, 1964, until her death in March 2001. With Prats he had two children. He was the advertising spokesman for Century Village, Florida, a retirement community.

Buttons was an early member of the Synagogue for the Performing Arts, and at the time Rabbi Jerome Cutler was the rabbi.

=== Death ===
Buttons died of complications from cardiovascular disease on July 13, 2006, at age 87 at his home in Century City, Los Angeles. He had been ill for a while and was with family members when he died. His ashes were given to his family after cremation.

== Filmography ==
=== Film ===
| Year | Title | Role | Notes |
|---|---|---|---|
| 1944 | Winged Victory | Whitey/Andrews Sister | Credited as 'Cpl. Red Buttons' |
| 1946 | 13 Rue Madeleine | Second Jump Master | Uncredited |
| 1951 | Footlight Varieties | Himself | |
| 1957 | Sayonara | Airman Joe Kelly | |
| 1958 | Imitation General | Corporal Chan Derby | |
| 1959 | The Big Circus | Randy Sherman | |
| 1961 | One, Two, Three | MP Sergeant | Uncredited |
| 1962 | Hatari! | Pockets | |
| 1962 | Five Weeks in a Balloon | Donald O'Shay | |
| 1962 | The Longest Day | Private John Steele | |
| 1962 | Gay Purr-ee | Robespieree (voice) | |
| 1963 | A Ticklish Affair | Flight Officer Simon "Uncle Cy" Shelley | |
| 1964 | Your Cheatin' Heart | Shorty Younger | |
| 1965 | Up from the Beach | Private first class Harry Devine | |
| 1965 | Harlow | Arthur Landau | |
| 1966 | Stagecoach | Peacock | |
| 1969 | They Shoot Horses, Don't They? | Sailor | |
| 1971 | Who Killed Mary What's 'Er Name? | Mickey Isador | |
| 1972 | The Poseidon Adventure | James Martin | |
| 1976 | Gable and Lombard | Ivan Cooper | |
| 1977 | Viva Knievel! | Ben Andrews | |
| 1977 | Pete's Dragon | Hoagy | |
| 1978 | Movie Movie | Peanuts/Jinks Murphy | Both segments of film |
| 1979 | C.H.O.M.P.S. | Bracken | |
| 1980 | When Time Ran Out... | Francis Fendly | |
| 1988 | 18 Again! | Charlie | |
| 1990 | The Ambulance | Elias Zacharai | |
| 1994 | It Could Happen to You | Walter Zakuto | |
| 1999 | The Story of Us | Arnie Jordan | |
| 2001 | Odessa or Bust | The Old Man | Short film |

=== Television ===
| Year | Title | Role | Notes |
|---|---|---|---|
| 1948 | The Milton Berle Show | Himself | Episode: "Red Buttons/Judy Canova/The Crackerjacks/Ella Logan/Russell Swan" |
| 1951 | Suspense | | Episode: "Merryman's Murder" |
| 1952–55 | The Red Buttons Show | Himself (Host) | Main cast |
| 1952–66 | The Ed Sullivan Show | Himself | 10 episodes |
| 1956 | Studio One | St. Emergency | Episode: "The Tale of St. Emergency" |
| 1958 | The Eddie Fisher Show | Himself | 2 episodes |
| 1959 | Playhouse 90 | Jerry | Episode: "A Marriage of Strangers" |
| 1959 | Startime | Joe Henders | Episode: "Something Special" |
| 1959–61 | General Electric Theater | Tippy-Top/Lieutenant George Poole | 2 episodes |
| 1960 | Death Valley Days | Levi Strauss | Episode: "The Million Dollar Pants" |
| 1960 | The United States Steel Hour | Inspector Plover | Episode: "The Case of the Missing Wife" |
| 1962 | Frontier Circus | Earl Youngblood | Episode: "Never Won Fair Lady" |
| 1962 | Saints and Sinners | Joe Roganyan | Episode: "All the Hard Young Men" |
| 1962 | Password | Himself (Celebrity Contestant) | Episode: "Jane Powell vs. Red Buttons" |
| 1982–85 | The Tonight Show Starring Johnny Carson | Himself | 17 episodes |
| 1964 | The Eleventh Hour | Cody Evans | Episode: "Sunday Father" |
| 1964 | The Greatest Show on Earth | Walter Wallace | Episode: "The Last of the Strongmen" |
| 1965 | Ben Casey | Bill Jacoby | Episode: "Journeys End in Lovers Meeting" |
| 1965–66 | The Andy Williams Show | Himself | 2 episodes |
| 1966 | The Double Life of Henry Phyfe | Henry Wadsworth Phyfe | Main cast |
| 1966–73 | The Bob Hope Show | Himself | 3 episodes |
| 1967 | The Danny Thomas Hour | Al Risko | Episode: "The Zero Man" |
| 1967–68 | The Dean Martin Show | Himself | 2 episodes |
| 1967–74 | The Merv Griffin Show | Himself | 16 episodes |
| 1968–69 | The Jackie Gleason Show | Himself | 2 episodes |
| 1969–70 | Love, American Style | Norman (segment "Love and the Geisha") | 2 episodes |
| 1970–73 | The Hollywood Squares | Himself (Panelist) | 3 episodes |
| 1973 | ABC Afterschool Special | Alexander | Episode: "Alexander" |
| 1975 | Little House on the Prairie | William "Willie" O'Hara | Episode: "Circus Man" |
| 1975 | Wonder Woman | Ashley Norman | Episode: "The New Original Wonder Woman" |
| 1975 | Let's Make a Deal | Himself (Special Guest) | Episode: "#5.1" |
| 1975–84 | Dean Martin Celebrity Roast | Himself | 14 episodes |
| 1978 | Vega$ | Tommy Cirko | 2 episodes |
| 1980 | Pink Lady | Police Sergeant / Himself | 2 episodes |
| 1981 | Aloha Paradise | Nick | Episode: "Letter from Broadway/Letter from Cyrano/Letter from a Secret Admirer" |
| 1978–83 | The Love Boat | Jimmy Morrow/Buddy Redmond/Uncle Cyrus Foster | 3 episodes |
| 1978–83 | Fantasy Island | Marty Howard/Cornelius Kelly/Tony Emerson | 3 episodes |
| 1987 | 227 | Toots | Episode: "The Audit" |
| 1987 | Knots Landing | Al Baker | 6 episodes |
| 1987–89 | It's Garry Shandling's Show. | Himself | 2 episodes |
| 1991 | The Cosby Show | Jake Bennett | Episode: "Cliff and Jake" |
| 1993–94 | Roseanne | Jake | 2 episodes |
| 1997 | Cosby | Mr. Tibbles | Episode: "My Dinner with Methuseleh" |
| 1995–98 | Biography | Himself (Interviewee) | 5 episodes |
| 1995–2005 | ER | Jules "Ruby" Rubadoux | 5 episodes |
| 1999 | Early Edition | Walter Stites | Episode: "Pinch Hitters" |
| 2000 | Family Law | Carl Porter | Episode: "Second Chance" |
| 2002 | Philly | Murray Klopman | Episode: "The Curse of the Klopman Diamonds" |
| 2002 | Street Time | Sam Kahan | 4 episodes |
| 2002 | Presidio Med | Chick | Episode: "Milagros" |

==== TV films, miniseries, and specials ====
| Year | Title | Role | Notes |
|---|---|---|---|
| 1958 | Hansel and Gretel | Hansel | |
| 1963 | 20th Annual Golden Globes | Himself (Host) | |
| 1970 | George M! | Sam H. Harris | |
| 1970 | Breakout | Pipes | |
| 1976 | Louis Armstrong — Chicago Style | Red Cleveland | |
| 1976 | Flannery and Quilt | Luke Flannery | |
| 1977 | The Sunshine Boys | Willie Clark | |
| 1977 | Telethon | Marty Rand | |
| 1978 | The Users | Warren Ambrose | |
| 1979 | Rudolph and Frosty's Christmas in July | Milton (voice) | |
| 1980 | Power | Solly Weiss | |
| 1980 | The Dream Merchant | Bruce Benson | |
| 1981 | Leave 'em Laughing | Roland | |
| 1981 | Side Show | Harry | |
| 1982 | Off Your Rocker | Seymour Slatz | |
| 1985 | Reunion at Fairborough | Jiggs Quealy | |
| 1985 | Alice in Wonderland | The White Rabbit | |
| 1998 | Ghosts of Fear Street | Grandpa | |

== Awards and nominations ==
| Accolade | Year | Category | Work | Result | Ref. |
|---|---|---|---|---|---|
| Academy Award | 1958 | Best Supporting Actor | Sayonara | Won | |
| BAFTA Award | 1959 | Most Promising Newcomer to Films | Sayonara | Nominated | |
| Golden Boot Award | 1984 | Honoree | —N/a | Honored | |
| Golden Globe Award | 1958 | Best Supporting Actor – Motion Picture | Sayonara | Won | |
| Golden Globe Award | 1966 | Best Supporting Actor – Motion Picture | Harlow | Nominated | |
| Golden Globe Award | 1970 | Best Supporting Actor – Motion Picture | They Shoot Horses, Don't They? | Nominated | |
| Laurel Award | 1958 | Top New Male Personality | —N/a | Nominated | |
| Laurel Award | 1958 | Top Male Supporting Performance | Sayonara | Won | |
| Laurel Award | 1959 | Top Male Supporting Performance | Imitation General | Nominated | |
| Primetime Emmy Award | 2005 | Outstanding Guest Actor in a Drama Series | ER ("Ruby Redux") | Nominated | |
| Saturn Award | 1977 | Best Supporting Actor | Pete's Dragon | Nominated | |
