= Jeep Show =

A Jeep Show was a Western Front European Theatre of Operations initiative to bring entertainment to rapidly advancing American troops.

== Bringing entertainment to a rapidly moving front ==
During the Second World War the United Service Organizations and Army's Special Services brought entertainment to American servicemen and women in both the United States and overseas from isolated outposts to military bases near the front lines. However, in late 1944 the American military was advancing through Western Europe so fast that entertainment units could not keep up with them.

Major Joshua Logan then an officer in Special Services noted that the advancing G.I.s were "never in one place long enough to see a show". He was credited with coming up with the idea of small quick moving entertainment units to entertain at rapid notice called "jeep shows".

A jeep show consisted of three unarmed soldier entertainers, often including a serving soldier who had been a well known celebrity from Broadway, Hollywood, the Golden Age of Radio or club entertainment such as Mickey Rooney, Bobby Breen and Red Buttons. The small troupe usually comprised a comedian, dancer/singer and musician. They traveled in a jeep with their musical instruments and other equipment carried in a quarter ton trailer that would be converted into a stage. They broadcast their show through a public address system using the jeep's battery. Each show lasted an average of 45 minutes and troupes could be combined into nine or 18 man shows for larger shows. The jeep show troops carried easily transportable musical instruments such as guitars, saxophones, banjos, accordions and drums. The troupe presented songs, skit, jokes, dancing, and pantomime

Rooney recalled his first show being between two Sherman tanks three miles from the front in Belgium for 60 soldiers. Rooney's troupe sometimes put on seven shows a day and covered 150,000 miles in a year,

One unit of 54 men served the Western European front, another unit of 15 men served in the Mediterranean Theater of Operations.

Before Victory in Europe Day the jeep shows played before 23,749 troops in eighty-one performances.
