= The Double Life of Henry Phyfe =

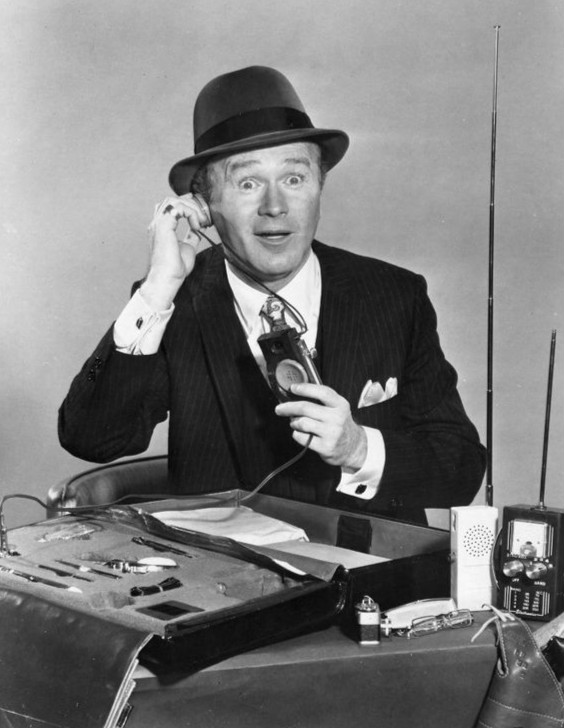
- Genre: Sitcom
- Created by: Luther Davis
- Starring: Red Buttons; Fred Clark; Parley Baer; Zeme North
- Theme music composer: Vic Mizzy
- Country of origin: United States
- Original language: English
- No. of seasons: 1
- No. of episodes: 17

Production
- Running time: 30 minutes
- Production companies: Luther Davis Productions; Filmways Television

Original release
- Network: ABC
- Release: January 13 – May 5, 1966

The Double Life of Henry Phyfe is an American sitcom broadcast on ABC from January 13 to September 1, 1966, and starring Red Buttons.

== Plot ==
Henry Phyfe (Buttons) was a mild-mannered accountant, until circumstances forced the American Counter Intelligence Service (CIS) to recruit him to impersonate a foreign agent named U-31, who had been killed in an automobile accident. The agent looked just like Phyfe, but the two men's personalities were drastically different. That severe contrast laid the groundwork for many of the episodes.

Also seen regularly were Phyfe's girlfriend, Judy Kimball; Judy's mother (and Henry's prospective mother-in-law) Florence; Mr. Hamble, Henry's boss at the accounting firm; and Gerald Hannahan, the regional director of CIS and Henry's agency boss. Hannahan was the lone series regular to know Henry's secret (though other CIS employees seen in various episodes also knew).

Judy, Florence and Mr. Hamble were all dropped from the show after the ninth episode in production order. However, as the episodes were aired out of sequence, these three characters are seen through episode 8 as aired, then disappear for a while. All three return in episode 14 for one final appearance.

A recurring plot line is that Hannahan has to persuade Phyfe—usually through trickery—to undertake each mission, as Phyfe adamantly wants nothing to do with the agency, or with Hannahan, or with being a spy. As well, U-31 had a wide range of specialized skills (golf, samurai sword fighting, etc) which Phyfe often attempts to learn (generally unsuccessfully) just before each mission.

== Cast ==
- Red Buttons as Henry Phyfe
- Fred Clark as Gerald B. Hannahan
- Zeme North as Judy Kimball
- Marge Redmond as Mrs. Florence Kimball
- Parley Baer as Mr. Hamble

== Episodes ==
No.	Title	Directed by	Written by	Original release date
1	"Phyfe and a Filly"	Unknown	Unknown	January 13, 1966
2	"Phyfe on a Ferry"	Charles R. Rondeau	Harry WInkler & Hannibal Coons and Ronald Axe	January 20, 1966
3	"Whatever Happened to Yesterday?"	Leslie H. Martinson	Ben Starr	January 27, 1966
4	"Phyfe and the Models"	Unknown	Unknown	February 3, 1966
5	"The Reluctant Lover"	Howard Morris	Leo Rifkin	February 10, 1966
6	"Phyfe's First Felony"	Charles R. Rondeau	Rich Eustis & Al Rogers	February 17, 1966
7	"The Unfriendly Persuasion"	Leslie H. Martinson	Story by : Charles Marion & Monroe Manning; Teleplay by : Phil Leslie and William Raynor & Myles Wilder	February 24, 1966
8	"Phyfe and the Code Book"	Unknown	Unknown	March 3, 1966
9	"The Old Flame"	Unknown	Unknown	March 10, 1966
10	"Operation Henry Phyfe"	Unknown	Unknown	March 17, 1966
11	"Visit to Washington"	Unknown	Unknown	March 24, 1966
12	"Phyfe Takes a Wife"	Unknown	Unknown	March 31, 1966
13	"Jail Bird Phyfe"	Howard Morris	Sloan Nibley & Bill Lutz	April 7, 1966
14	"Spend a Million Phyfe"	Unknown	Unknown	April 14, 1966
15	"A Shot in the Dark"	Unknown	Unknown	April 21, 1966
16	"Phyfe Goes Skiing"	Unknown	Unknown	April 28, 1966
17	"Will the Real U-31 Try to Stand Up?"	Unknown	Unknown	May 5, 1966

== Overview ==
Actor Peter Bonerz had auditioned for the role of Henry Phyfe before Red Buttons was selected.

Buttons noted that, unlike Agent Maxwell Smart in NBC's Get Smart, his character was shy, used no gadgets in his work, and was an impostor, not an actual agent. Phyfe's CIS boss was played by Fred Clark, who bore a superficial physical resemblance to Smart's "Chief" played by Edward Platt.

The show marked Buttons' return to weekly television after his variety show had ended a three-year run in 1955. During the interim, Buttons found roles in 15 different motion pictures, including an Academy Award-winning performance in the 1957 Marlon Brando film, Sayonara.

The concept of an "every man" recruited to impersonate someone of importance has been used for many years in literature (for example, The Prisoner of Zenda). A few months after the series' cancellation, the animated film, The Man Called Flintstone, featured the same premise as Henry Phyfe, while another TV series, The Man Who Never Was, debuted in the fall of 1966 with the premise reversed as a spy found himself impersonating a businessman who had been killed.
