= King Creole =

1958 film by Michael Curtiz

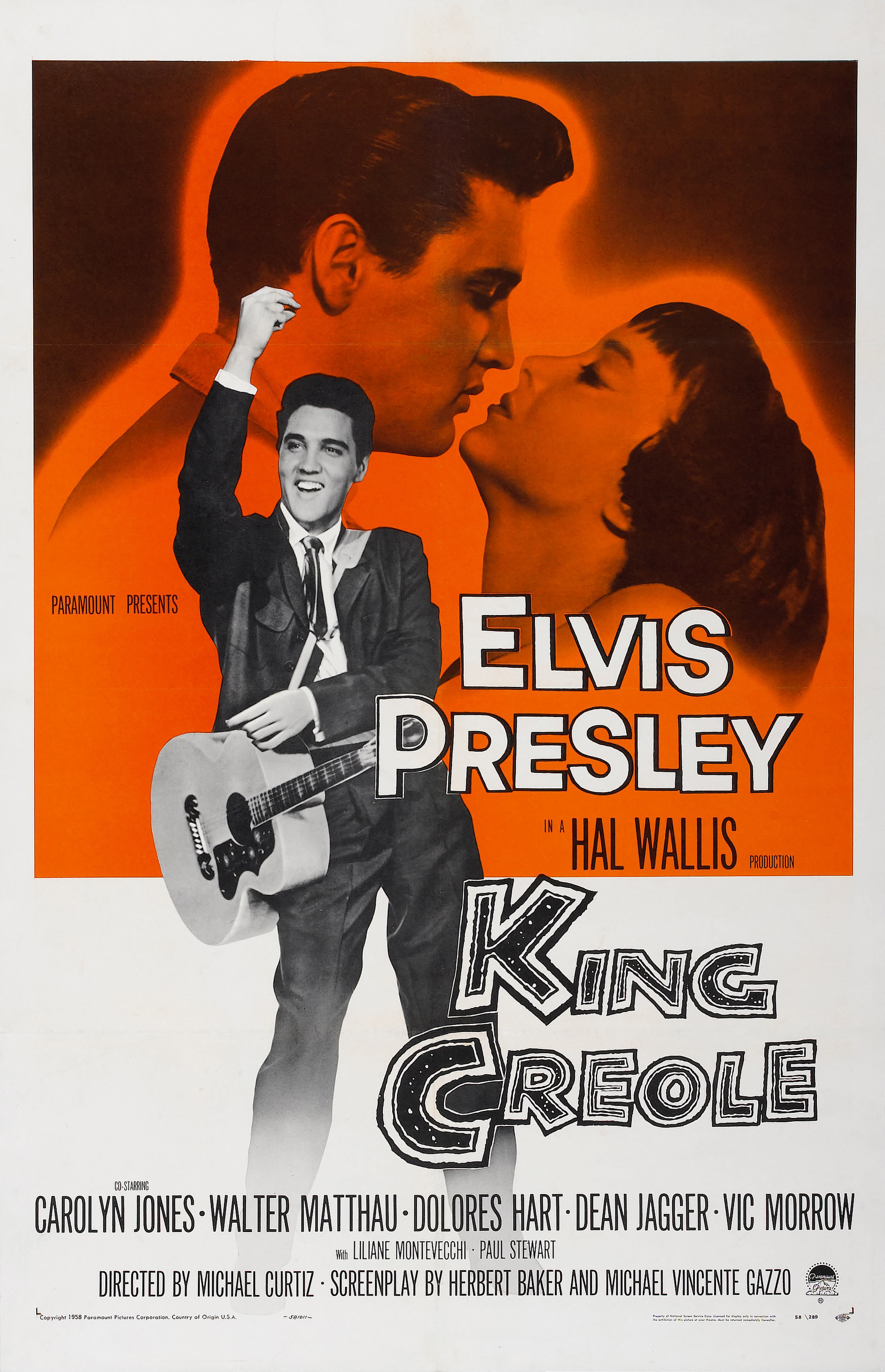
- Theatrical release poster
- Directed by: Michael Curtiz
- Screenplay by: Herbert Baker; Michael V. Gazzo
- Based on: A Stone for Danny Fisher by Harold Robbins
- Produced by: Hal B. Wallis
- Starring: Elvis Presley; Carolyn Jones; Walter Matthau; Dolores Hart; Dean Jagger; Vic Morrow; Liliane Montevecchi; Paul Stewart
- Cinematography: Russell Harlan
- Edited by: Warren Low
- Music by: Walter Scharf
- Production company: Hal Wallis Productions
- Distributed by: Paramount Pictures
- Release date: July 2, 1958 (United States)
- Running time: 116 minutes
- Country: United States
- Language: English

King Creole is a 1958 American musical teen drama film directed by Michael Curtiz and based on the 1952 novel A Stone for Danny Fisher by Harold Robbins. Produced by Hal B. Wallis, the film stars Elvis Presley, Carolyn Jones, Walter Matthau, Dolores Hart, Dean Jagger, Vic Morrow, Liliane Montevecchi and Paul Stewart, and it follows a 19-year-old (Presley) who gets mixed up with crooks and involved with two women.

Presley later indicated that of all the characters that he portrayed throughout his acting career, the role of Danny Fisher in King Creole was his favorite. To make the film, Presley was granted a 60-day deferment from January to March 1958 for beginning his military service. Location shooting in New Orleans was delayed several times by crowds of fans attracted by the stars, particularly Presley.

The film was released on July 2, 1958, by Paramount Pictures to critical and commercial success. Many critics praised Presley's performance, and the film peaked at number five on the Variety box-office earnings chart. The soundtrack song "Hard Headed Woman" reached number one on the Billboard singles chart and number two on the R&B chart, and was certified gold by the Recording Industry Association of America (RIAA), while the soundtrack album peaked at number two on the Billboard album chart.

== Plot ==
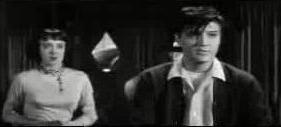
Danny protects Ronnie from one of Maxie Field's customers

Danny Fisher, a 19-year-old high school student, works part time to support his father and sister Mimi. Danny's mother has died, and when his grieving father lost his job as a pharmacist, he moved his impoverished family to the French Quarter in New Orleans.

At work one morning, Danny rescues Ronnie from an abusive date and they ride by taxi to Danny's high school. She thanks him with a kiss, prompting teasing from Danny's schoolmates. He responds by kissing Ronnie back, and punching one of his tormentors. During the resulting trip to the principal's office, Miss Pearson, his teacher, tells him he will not graduate. Principal Evans is sympathetic but powerless to help, and Danny drops out of school. Three young men take Danny into an alley as he leaves the school grounds. Gang leader Shark wants revenge for Danny hitting his brother, but Danny defends himself so well that Shark invites him to join them. Danny's dad tries to convince him to stay in school.

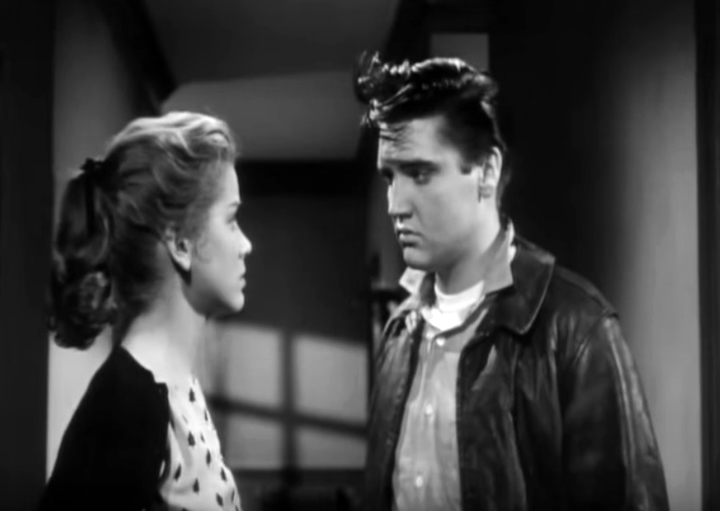
Nellie confesses to Danny that she is willing to see him again

Danny helps Shark's gang shoplift at a five-and-dime by singing "Lover Doll" to distract the customers and staff.

Only Nellie, working at the snack bar, notices his complicity in the theft, but she doesn't report him. Danny invites Nellie to a fictitious party in a hotel room. Finding nobody else there, she starts crying and leaves after admitting that she still wants to see him again, but not under those conditions.

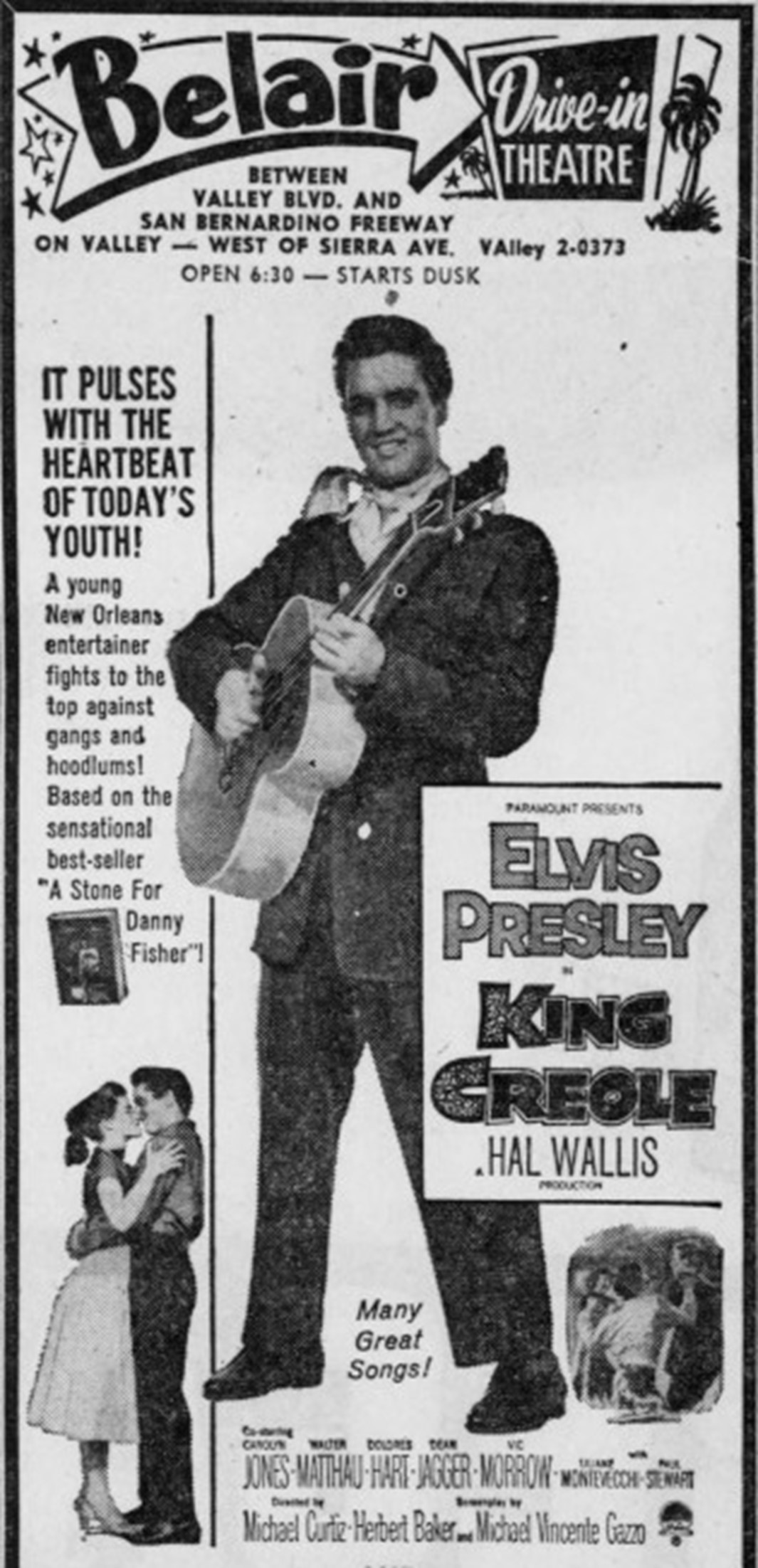
Drive-in advertisement from 1958

Danny meets Ronnie again at The Blue Shade night club, where he works evenings. She's accompanied by her boyfriend and the club's owner, Maxie Fields, aka "The Pig" and pretends not to know Danny. Maxie suspects she does know him, and she explains she heard Danny sing once. Maxie insists that Danny prove he can sing. His rendition of "Trouble" impresses Charlie LeGrand, the honest owner of the King Creole club, the only nightspot in the area not owned by Maxie. He offers Danny a job as a singer.

Danny's dad finds work as a pharmacist, under the constantly demeaning boss Mr. Primont. Danny take's Charlie's offer against his father's wishes. When Danny becomes a successful singer, Maxie tries to hire him. Danny declines his offer out of loyalty to Charlie. Shark, now working for Maxie, suggests to Danny they beat up Primont to help his father. When Mr. Fisher leaves the store having borrowed Primont's hat and coat, Shark recognizes him but mugs him anyway, as that would be even better for Maxie's purposes. Danny's father is so badly injured he needs an expensive operation, which Maxie pays for. Maxie blackmails Danny into signing with him by threatening to tell his father about his involvement in the mugging. Danny pummels Maxie and helps Ronnie leave him.

Maxie sends his henchmen after Danny. Shark and another gang member trap him in an alley. Danny knocks out one of his pursuers. Shark stabs Danny but is killed. Ronnie finds Danny and takes him to her house to recover. She asks him to forget her sordid past and pretend to love her. Danny replies that it would not be difficult and kisses her. Maxie drives up, accompanied by Dummy, a member of Danny's former gang. Maxie fatally shoots Ronnie. Dummy, who had been befriended by Danny, grapples with Maxie, but the gun goes off, killing its owner.

Danny returns to the King Creole. He sings the lines, "Let's think of the future, forget the past, you're not my first love, but you're my last", to Nellie in the audience. Mr. Fisher arrives to listen to his son sing.

== Cast ==
- Elvis Presley as Danny Fisher
- Carolyn Jones as Ronnie, Maxie's mistress
- Walter Matthau as Maxie Fields, the local gangster
- Dolores Hart as Nellie, a five-and-dime employee who falls for Danny
- Dean Jagger as Mr. Fisher, Danny's father
- Liliane Montevecchi as Nina "Forty Nina", a stripper at the King Creole nightclub
- Vic Morrow as "Shark", Maxie's lead thug
- Paul Stewart as Charlie LeGrand, owner of the King Creole
- Jan Shepard as Mimi Fisher, Danny's sister
- Brian G. Hutton as Sal, a member of Shark's gang.
- Jack Grinnage as "Dummy", a mute member of Shark's gang.
- Dick Winslow as Eddie Burton
- Raymond Bailey as Mr. Evans, the school principal
- Gavin Gordon as Mr. Primont, drug store manager and Mr. Fisher's overbearing boss

== Production ==
Hal Wallis acquired the rights to A Stone for Danny Fisher in February 1955 for $25,000, with the intention of giving the lead role of a New York boxer to either James Dean or Ben Gazzara. The role was originally written for Dean, but the project was canceled after his death in 1955. In January 1957, following the success of an off-Broadway stage version of the story, Presley was suggested as a possible replacement. After negotiations were completed, the character of Fisher was changed from a boxer to a singer and the location was moved from New York to New Orleans.

Wallis selected Michael Curtiz, a noted director of the Hollywood studio system whose works included The Adventures of Robin Hood, Yankee Doodle Dandy and Casablanca. Curtiz decided to shoot the film in black-and-white for dramatic ambiance and to give the streets a film noir appearance. He also selected an experienced cast to support Presley, including Walter Matthau and Carolyn Jones, as well as Dolores Hart, Presley's co-star in the 1957 film Loving You. Curtiz instructed a "taken aback" Presley to lose fifteen pounds and shave his sideburns for the role, both of which Presley did.

On December 20, 1957, a month before filming was due to begin, Presley received his draft notice. Presley and Paramount had to request special permission to defer Presley's enlistment to allow him to finish the film. Both pointed out to the draft board that a delay in filming would cost them a large sum of money invested in the pre-production of the film. On December 27, Presley received a 60-day deferment.

Filming took place between January 20 and March 10, 1958, mostly at Paramount Studios in Los Angeles, California, and on location in the French Quarter in New Orleans, Louisiana. The bayou scene was filmed at Lake Pontchartrain. During filming, Presley was constantly moved to avoid the crowds of fans who came to see him on location, which delayed the filmmaking. Wallis had rented a house for Presley's privacy, and a second one after one of his assistants noticed that the back of the houses in the block led to the back of the houses on the adjacent street. To escape from the crowds, Presley would climb to the roof of one house and cross over onto the roof of the other. After a fan discovered his path, he resided on the tenth floor of the Beverly Wilshire Hotel, which was rented for the whole cast.

Before filming began, Curtiz was convinced that Presley would be a "conceited boy", but after a few weeks of working together, he described Presley as a "lovely boy" who would go on to be a "wonderful actor". Presley, after seeing an early copy of the finished film, thanked Curtiz for giving him the opportunity to show his potential as an actor; he later cited Danny Fisher as his favorite role of his acting career. Fourteen days after the completion of King Creole, Presley was officially inducted into the U.S. Army.

== Reception ==
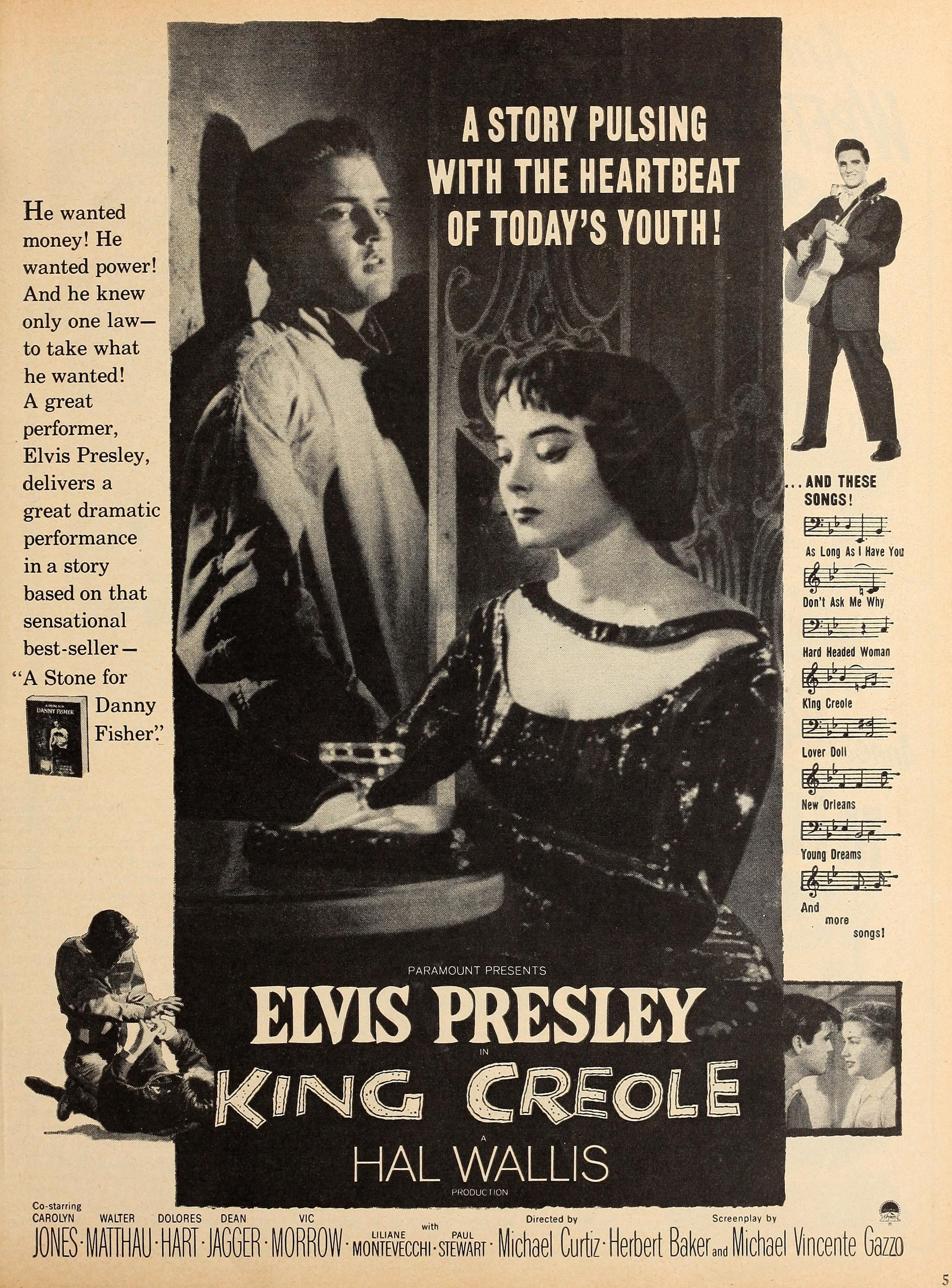
Advertisement in Modern Screen (Aug 1958)

The film was first shown at Loew's State Theater in New York City on July 2, 1958. During the opening week, it ranked number five in box-office earnings on the Variety national survey. The film received critical acclaim. King Creole was another financial success at the box office for Elvis, grossing $2.64 million in North America at the box office in 1958 alone.

During the May 1959 Mexican premiere at Américas Cinema in Mexico City, a riot started when, according to the local newspapers, 600 teenagers broke into the theater without paying the admission fee. The crowd occupied the balcony area and destroyed the seats while they threw flaming papers and debris to the attendants. As some women tried to leave the premises, they were stripped of their clothing by the rioters. The group was reported to be a mixture of university students and other locals. The anti-riot police arrived to the scene, and they scattered the crowd, but no arrests were made. Writer Parménides García Saldaña recounted the incident on his article "El Rey Criollo", in which he detailed the presence of gangs and their harassment of the women in attendance.

=== Critical reception ===
Billboard wrote:

Elvis Presley's new film shapes up as a box-office winner. It's got plenty of action and characterisation and the star gives his best acting performance to date ... (the) Incidents and characters of the original novel are distorted, but the plot stands up well and the dialog is salty and emotion-packed. As Danny, Presley exhibits improved histrionics and provides many moving and tense moments. Carolyn Jones is a knockout as a fallen thrush who would like to love him; their aborted romance gives the pic its finest scenes.

Variety declared that the film "shows the young star [Presley] as a better than fair actor".

Howard Thompson of The New York Times also gave a favorable review:

Mr. Curtiz and his players have got it snugly draped around Mr. Presley's shoulders. And there it stays, until a limp melodramatic home stretch, even with eight or so of those twitching, gyrating musical interludes. ... These also perfectly typify the Bourbon Street honky-tonks that Mr. Curtiz and his fine photographer, Russ Harlan, have beguilingly drenched with atmosphere. Matching, or balancing, the tunes are at least seven characterizations that supply the real backbone and tell the story of the picture. ... for Mr. Presley, in his third screen attempt, it's a pleasure to find him up to a little more than Bourbon Street shoutin' and wigglin'. Acting is his assignment in this shrewdly upholstered showcase, and he does it, so help us over a picket fence.

The Spectator, however, criticized the relationship of Presley's character with his love interests:

The girls in his (Michael Curtiz's) latest film, King Creole, are both played by good, serious actresses: Carolyn Jones and Dolores Hart... Both are shown to be hungrily, desperately, unpridefully in love with him (Presley's character). They have no existence, except in him; do nothing but wait for him; hope for nothing but a little rough affection... Instead of being kissed, they beg for kisses, which Mr. Presley sulkily and reluctantly hands out now and then, with the air of a small, fastidious boy being pressed to eat marshmallow and, though he feels a bit sick, not quite knowing how to get out of it... As the most extreme example of a contemporary idol, Mr. Presley is pretty fascinating, and, though you may be put off at first by his pale, puffy, bruised looking babyish face, by the weary cherubic decadence you might imagine in Nero, and the excessive greasiness of his excessively long, spiky locks, his films, however bad (and King Creole is pretty low on his list), are well worth taking a look at.

About Presley's performance, DownBeat wrote, "Let it be noted that Elvis Presley's latest, King Creole, is his best picture thus far--comparatively speaking, of course. Maybe about 10 more films (and as many drama coaches) from now Elvis might begin to get an inkling of what acting's all about."

TV-Radio Mirror praised Presley's acting over his past roles: "Elvis Presley does his strongest acting job so far. Two years ago, Presley on the screen was a laughing stock. But nobody is laughing now."

Meanwhile, The Monthly Film Bulletin criticized the violence depicted in the film and rated the movie a III, denoting poor, stating, "This entangled series of cliches, each with more unlikely motivation than the last, provides the most unattractive Presley vehicle so far. His numbers only offer intermittent relief from the calculated violence and viciousness, and he can do little to balance the disagreeable movie."

Commonweal lamented the lack of punishment to the main character for his actions, but praised the director for his influence on Presley:

No doubt adults won't be moved much by "King Creole" one way or the other, but unfortunately teenage audiences may be taken in, especially since Danny is supposed to be a sympathetic character and at the end goes unpunished by the police for his crimes ... It must be said in favor of Director Michael Curtiz that he does succeed in getting Presley to act every now and then, but the cards are stacked in such an obvious manner against Danny that even Montgomery Clift couldn't have handled the role with conviction.

Catholic World commented:

Playing a part— an underprivileged youth who, on and off, displays some dignity and honest aspirations — that requires some histrionic effort, Presley shows signs that he is getting the hang of acting. The picture itself, however, after a promising enough beginning turns into a lurid melodramatic hash composed in about equal part of juvenile delinquency, gangsterism and sex. These may be legitimate dramatic subjects but the script gives them an illegitimate viewpoint and leaves muddled moral issues dangling.

The Florence Times wrote of Presley:

The fellow isn't a bad actor. Of course, he's nothing at all sensational and the Academy Award isn't in danger, but there are Hollywood habitues who've gotten by for years with less ability. In fact, given the normal amount of the more painstaking type of direction, it is entirely possible that Mr. Wiggle-hips could develop into a really competent actor. As long, however, as he can continue to attract audiences in present proportions there's little need in worrying with drama schools.

Allrovi rated the movie with four stars out of five, stating, "The film's highlight is a brief exchange of fisticuffs between Elvis and Walter Matthau. Together with Jailhouse Rock, King Creole is one of the best filmed examples of the untamed, pre-army Elvis Presley."

Filmink called it "one of Elvis’ best-ever efforts)... Elvis is at his most early period Tony Curtis here – all snarls, swivelling hips and chip on the shoulder."

On the review aggregator website Rotten Tomatoes, 96% of 24 critics' reviews are positive, with an average rating of 7.1/10.

== Home media ==
The film was released on VHS by Paramount Pictures in 1986. In 2000, it was released on DVD with remastered sound and image, featuring the original theatrical trailer. On April 21, 2020, it was released on Blu-ray as part of the Paramount Presents label.

== See also ==
- List of American films of 1958
- List of films with a 100% rating on Rotten Tomatoes, a film review aggregation website
- List of hood films

== Bibliography ==
- Adam, Victor (2008). The Elvis Encyclopedia. Overlook Duckworth. ISBN 978-0-7156-3816-3.
- Caine, Andrew James (2004). Interpreting Rock Movies: The Pop Film and its Critics in Britain. Manchester University Press. ISBN 978-0-7190-6538-5.
- Craddock, Jim (2005). Videohound's Golden Movie Retriever. Thomson/Gale. ISBN 978-0-7876-7470-0.
- Dick, Bernard (2004). Hal Wallis: producer to the stars. University Press of Kentucky. ISBN 978-0-8131-2317-2.
- Doll, Susan (1994). Elvis, Rock 'N' Roll Legend. Publications International. ISBN 978-0-7853-0871-3.
- Doll, Susan (2009). Elvis for Dummies. For Dummies. ISBN 978-0-470-47202-6.
- Guralnick, Peter; Jorgensen Ernst (1999). Elvis day by day. Ballantine Books. ISBN 978-0-345-42089-3.
- Jagger, Dan (2002). Elvis Presley: Silver Screen Icon: A Collection of Movie Posters. The Overmountain Press. ISBN 978-1-57072-232-5.
- Jeansonne, Glenn; Luhrssen, David; Sokolovic, Dan (2011). Elvis Presley, Reluctant Rebel: His Life and Our Times. ABC-Clio. ISBN 978-0-313-35904-0.
- Jorgenson, Ernst (1998). Elvis Presley: A Life In Music. St. Martin's Press. ISBN 978-0-312-18572-5.
- Kirchberg, Connie; Hendrickx, Marc (1999). Elvis Presley, Richard Nixon, and the American dream. McFarland. ISBN 978-0-7864-0716-3.
- Landers, Steve (2000). The Life Of Elvis Aaron Presley Elvis Facts For Elvis Fans. Lulu Press. ISBN 978-1-4357-3905-5.
- Reid, John Howard (2006). More Movie Musicals. Lulu Press. ISBN 978-1-4116-7342-7.
- Wallis, Hal B.; Higham, Charles (1980). Starmaker: The Autobiography of Hal Wallis. Macmillan Pub. Co. ISBN 978-0-02-623170-1.
- Widmer, Mary Lou (2004). New Orleans in the Fifties. Pelican Publishing. ISBN 978-1-58980-268-1.
- Zolov, Eric (1999). Refried Elvis: The Rise of the Mexican Counterculture. University of California Press. ISBN 978-0-520-21514-6.
- The Films and Career of Elvis Presley. Citadel Press. 1983. ISBN 978-0-8065-0889-4.
- Hartung, Phillip (August 1, 1958). "King Creole". Commonweal. 68. Commonweal Pub. Corp.
- "Screen Scene". Down Beat. 25. Maher Publications. 1958.
- "Movie Reviews: King Creole". The Spectator. 201. September 5, 1958.
