= Harold Robbins =

American author (1916–1997)

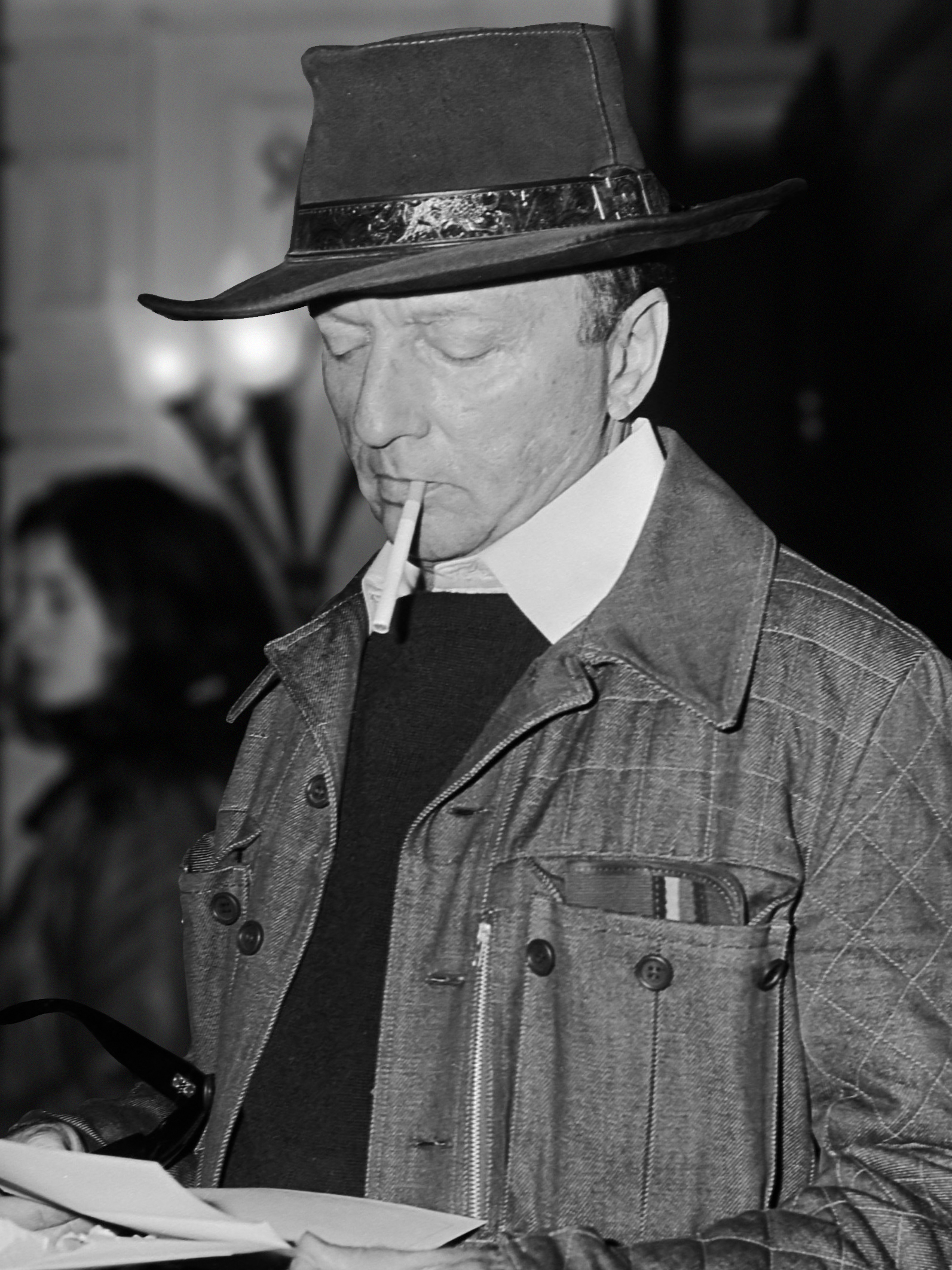
- Robbins in 1979
- Born: Francis Kane; May 21, 1916; New York City, U.S.
- Died: October 14, 1997 (aged 81); Palm Springs, California, U.S.
- Resting place: Forest Lawn Cemetery, Cathedral City, California
- Occupation: Author
- Spouse(s): Lillian Machnivitz (1937–1962; divorced); Grace Palermo (1965–1992; divorced); Jann Stapp (1992–1997, his death)

Harold Robbins (born Francis Kane; May 21, 1916 – October 14, 1997) was an American author. One of the best-selling writers of all time, he wrote over 25 best-sellers, selling over 750 million copies in 32 languages.

== Early life ==
Robbins was born Francis Kane to unknown parents in New York City in 1916. He was adopted by Frances "Fannie" Smith and Charles Rubin, well-educated Jewish emigrants from the Russian Empire, his father from Odessa and his mother from Neshwies (Nyasvizh), south of Minsk. Robbins later falsely claimed to be a Jewish orphan who had been raised in a Catholic boys' home. Instead he was raised by his father, a pharmacist, and his stepmother, Blanche, in Brooklyn.

Robbins dropped out of high school at 15 to enlist in the U.S. Navy. He claimed to have served on a submarine that was torpedoed, leaving him as the sole survivor; in fact, no U.S. submarines were torpedoed during the 1930s.

Robbins worked a variety of jobs, including errand boy, bookies' runner, and inventory clerk in a grocers. He was employed by Universal Pictures from 1940 to 1957, starting off as a clerk and rising to an executive.

== Work ==
His first book was Never Love a Stranger (1948). The Dream Merchants (1949) was a novel about the American film industry, from its beginning to the sound era in which Robbins blended his own life experiences with history, melodrama, sex, and glossy high society into a fast-moving story. His 1952 novel, A Stone for Danny Fisher, was adapted into a 1958 motion picture King Creole, which starred Elvis Presley.

Among his best-known books is The Carpetbaggers (1961)—featuring a protagonist who was a loose composite of Howard Hughes, Bill Lear, Harry Cohn, and Louis B. Mayer. The Carpetbaggers takes the reader from New York to California, from the prosperity of the aeronautical industry to the glamor of Hollywood. Its sequel, The Raiders, was released in 1995.

Film producer Joseph E. Levine acquired the rights to The Carpetbaggers in September 1962 and produced the 1964 film. He also acquired the rights to Robbins's next book Where Love Has Gone (1962) with the film version also released in 1964. In 1963, Levine paid Robbins $1 million for pre-publication and film rights for Robbins's upcoming book The Adventurers. The book was released in 1966 and was based on Robbins's experiences living in South America, including three months spent in the mountains of Colombia with a group of bandits. The film version was released in 1970. Robbins also created the ABC television series The Survivors (1969–1970), starring Ralph Bellamy and Lana Turner.

Robbins's editors included Cynthia White and Michael Korda and his literary agent was Paul Gitlin.

In July 1989, Robbins was involved in a literary controversy when the trade periodical Publishers Weekly revealed that around four pages from Robbins's novel The Pirate (1974) had been lifted without permission and integrated into Kathy Acker's novel The Adult Life of Toulouse Lautrec (1975), which had recently been re-published in the UK in a selection of early works by Acker titled Young Lust (1989). After Paul Gitlin saw the exposé in Publishers Weekly, he informed Robbins's UK publisher, Hodder & Stoughton, who requested that Acker's publisher Unwin Hyman withdraw and pulp Young Lust. Representatives for the novelist explained that Acker was well known for her deliberate use of literary appropriation—or bricolage, a postmodern technique akin to plagiarism in which fragments of pre-existing works are combined along with original writings to create new literary works. After an intervention by William S. Burroughs—a novelist who used appropriation in his own works of the 1960s—Robbins issued a statement to give Acker retroactive permission to appropriate from his work, avoiding legal action on his publisher's part.

Since his death, several new books have been published, written by ghostwriters and based on Robbins's own notes and unfinished stories. In several of these books, Junius Podrug has been credited as co-writer.

From the Hodder & Stoughton 2008 edition of The Carpetbaggers "about the author" section:

Robbins was the playboy of his day and a master of publicity. He was a renowned novelist but tales of his own life contain even more fiction than his books. What is known is that with reported worldwide sales of 750 million, Harold Robbins sold more books than J.K. Rowling, earned and spent $50m during his lifetime, and was as much a part of the sexual and social revolution as the pill, Playboy and pot. In March 1965, he had three novels on the British paperback bestseller list—Where Love Has Gone at No. 1, The Carpetbaggers at No. 3 and The Dream Merchants in the sixth spot.

== Personal life ==
Robbins was married three times, first to his high school sweetheart, Lillian Machnivitz. In 1965 he wed Grace Palermo, who went on to pen an account of her life with Robbins in 2013. Divorced in the early 1990s, Robbins married Jann Stapp in 1992; they remained together until his death.

He spent a great deal of time on the French Riviera and at Monte Carlo until his death from respiratory heart failure, at the age of 81 in Palm Springs, California. His cremated remains are interred at Forest Lawn Cemetery in Cathedral City. Robbins has a star on the Hollywood Walk of Fame at 6743 Hollywood Boulevard.

== Novels ==
- Never Love a Stranger, 1948 (made into the 1958 film)
- The Dream Merchants, 1949 (made into a 1980 TV miniseries)
- A Stone for Danny Fisher, 1952 (made into the 1958 film King Creole)
- Never Leave Me, 1953
- 79 Park Avenue, 1955 (made into the 1977 TV miniseries)
- Stiletto, 1960 (made into the 1969 film)
- The Carpetbaggers, 1961 (made into both the 1964 film of the same name and the 1966 film Nevada Smith)
- Where Love Has Gone, 1962 (made into the 1964 film)
- The Adventurers, 1966 (made into the 1970 film)
- The Inheritors, 1969
- The Betsy, 1971 (made into the 1978 film)
- The Pirate, 1974 (made into the 1978 TV movie)
- The Lonely Lady, 1976 (made into the 1983 film)
- Dreams Die First, 1977
- Memories of Another Day, 1979
- Goodbye, Janette, 1981
- The Storyteller, 1982
- Spellbinder, 1982
- Descent from Xanadu, 1984
- The Piranhas, 1986
- The Raiders, 1995 (sequel to The Carpetbaggers)
- The Stallion, 1996 (sequel to The Betsy)
- Tycoon, 1997

=== Posthumously published novels credited to Robbins ===
Works bearing Robbins' name continued to appear after his death. The earliest three posthumous Harold Robbins novels (The Predators (1998), The Secret (2000) and Never Enough (2001) are generally thought to have been completed by ghostwriters, but may have been partially or even substantially based on completed work or notes written by Robbins. Junius Podrug has been identified as the uncredited ghostwriter of Sin City (2002) and Heat of Passion (2003). From 2004 to 2011, a series of novels credited to Robbins and Podrug appeared, although they are strictly the work of Podrug, writing in Robbins's style.

- The Predators, 1998
- The Secret, 2000 (sequel to The Predators)
- Never Enough, 2001
- Sin City, 2002
- Heat of Passion, 2003
- The Betrayers (with Junius Podrug), 2004
- Blood Royal (with Junius Podrug), 2005
- The Devil to Pay (with Junius Podrug), 2006
- The Looters (with Junius Podrug), 2007, Madison Dupree No. 1
- The Deceivers (with Junius Podrug), 2008, Madison Dupree No. 2
- The Shroud (with Junius Podrug), 2009, Madison Dupree No. 3
- The Curse (with Junius Podrug), 2011, Madison Dupree No. 4

== In popular culture ==
- Robbins is referenced in the 1979 Fawlty Towers episode "Waldorf Salad", in which Sybil Fawlty and a hotel guest bond over their fondness for his novels while Basil disparages his writing as "transatlantic tripe" and "pornographic muzak".
- Robbins is mentioned (along with Jacqueline Susann) in Star Trek IV: The Voyage Home by Admiral James T. Kirk, as archetypal 20th century writers, whom his first officer Spock recognizes as "the giants".
