= Tycoon (novel) =

1997 novel by Harold Robbins

- First edition cover
- Author: Harold Robbins
- Language: English
- Publisher: Simon & Schuster
- Publication date: February 6, 1997
- Publication place: United States
- Media type: Hardcover
- Pages: 416
- ISBN: 978-0684810683
- OCLC: 35835818

Tycoon (sometimes subtitled Tycoon: A Novel), published in 1997, is the 23rd novel by Harold Robbins.

Starting in the 1930s and ending in the 1970s, it follows the career and love-life of Jack Lear, an entrepreneur who builds an empire in broadcasting. Typically for a Robbins novel, it contains a large amount and variety of sexual content. Kirkus Reviews describes it as a roman à clef, with Lear's career resembling that of William S. Paley.

A review by Reed Business Information inc. concludes: "Wooden prose notwithstanding, the intricate blend of corporate intrigue and carnal gymnastics makes this a highly seductive read."
