= Junius Podrug =

American author and lawyer (born 1947)

- Born: 1947 (age 78–79); Nevada City, California, U.S.
- Education: California State University, Sacramento (BA); McGeorge School of Law (JD)
- Occupations: Author; lawyer
- Spouse: Hildegard Krische
- Writing career
- Genres: Fiction; non-fiction
- Notable work: Night of the Naked Dead (2013)

Junius Podrug (born 1947) is an American author and lawyer. He was a defense attorney on the Chippendales dancers' federal murder and wrongful death legal cases. His fiction and non-fiction books have been published in twenty-eight countries under his own and four other names. His first novel, Frost of Heaven, was selected as Best First Novel by the Rocky Mountain News Unreal World book awards.

== Biography ==
Podrug was born in Nevada City, California, in 1947. He is the son of Mate, a miner, and Angela, a hotel maid. He is married to Hildegard Krische. He graduated from California State University, Sacramento with a B.A. in political science, and McGeorge School of Law with a J.D.. He practiced law in Sacramento and Beverly Hills before becoming a full time writer.

== Other works ==
Podrug's short story, "Vendetta", was published by Ellery Queen's Mystery Magazine in October 1973 in its Department of First Stories.

He is the writer, director and co-producer of a low budget independent film, Night of the Naked Dead.

== Bibliography ==
- Frost of Heaven (1992, 1998)
- Presumed Guilty (1997, also published as Winterkill)
- Dark Passage (2002)
- Feathered Serpent 2012 (2010)

With Harold Robbins

- Sin City (2002, uncredited)
- Heat of Passion (2003, uncredited)
- The Betrayers (2004)
- Blood Royal (2005)
- The Devil to Pay (2006)
- The Looters (2007)
- The Deceivers (2008)
- The Shroud (2009)
- The Curse (2011)

With Gary Jennings

- Aztec Blood (2001) (with Robert Gleason, uncredited)
- Aztec Rage (2006) (with Robert Gleason)
- Aztec Fire (2008) (with Robert Gleason)
- Apocalypse 2012 (2009) (with Robert Gleason)
- The 2012 Codex (2010) (with Robert Gleason)
- Aztec Revenge (2012)

=== Non-fiction ===
- Stop Being a Victim
- The Disaster Survival Bible
