= The Suffering (film) =

- Theatrical release poster
- Directed by: Robert Hamilton
- Screenplay by: Robert Hamilton; Marco Scola
- Produced by: Robert Hamilton; Marco Scola; Brandon Rose
- Starring: Phil Amico; Nick Apostolides; Elizabeth Deo
- Music by: Lianne Ward
- Production companies: Capture Glass Pictures; Reclusive Cinema
- Release date: July 29, 2016 (United States)
- Country: United States
- Language: English

The Suffering is a 2016 American horror/thriller film directed by Robert Hamilton, co-written by Hamilton and Marco Scola, and starring Phil Amico, Nick Apostolides, and Elizabeth Deo. It was released in the United States on July 29, 2016.

== Plot ==
Henry Dawles, a property appraiser, begins an assignment at an isolated rural farm owned by the enigmatic Mr Remiel. He finds himself trapped and haunted by unearthly beings.

== Cast ==
- Phil Amico as Mr. Remiel
- Nick Apostolides as Henry Dawles
- Liz Christmas as Selena
- Elizabeth Deo as Rebecca Dawles
- Kina Gee as Nurse
- Chappy Gould as Creature 1
- Timo Gould as Creature 2
- Lee Hamilton as Mrs. Gates
- Fahim Hussaini as Creature 3
- Reed Peltier as Child
- Chad Eric Smith as Ahmad
- Carl Stevens as Rail Thin Man
- Regen Wilson as Driver

== Critical reception ==
In his review for the Los Angeles Times, Noel Murray wrote, "Give credit to writer-director Robert Hamilton for trying something subtler than the average B-movie, but his film could've used a few more cheap shocks".

Reviewing for Starburst, Martin Unsworth gave The Suffering a score of eight stars from ten. He considered that "The Suffering is incredibly well acted, beautifully shot (making great use of the locations), and manages to build up an eerie atmosphere from the very start."

Decay Horror Mag gave "The Suffering" a score of three and a half stars from five, and wrote, "Horror enthusiasts and cinefiles will appreciate the creative direction" ... "Hamilton and Scola designed a screenplay with key elements infused into every scene."
