= Tycoon (video game) =

1980 video game

- Publisher: The Software Exchange
- Designer: David Bohlke
- Platform: TRS-80
- Release: WW: 1980
- Genre: Business simulation

Tycoon is a business simulation game for 1 to 5 players by David Bohlke for the TRS-80 Model I Level II and published by The Software Exchange.

== Gameplay ==
Tycoon is a game in which the player manages and makes financial decisions for a large business to increase the player's total worth and become a tycoon.

== Reception ==
J. Mishcon reviewed Tycoon in The Space Gamer No. 30. Mishcon commented that "As currently constituted, I'd advised against this game, but a second edition with more complete instructions (and perhaps some non-financial complications for extreme tactics) would be very interesting." In a SoftSide review, Brad Cameron wrote, "Buy this—it is the player's skillful decisions that may win them the game, as there are many different strategies to use."
