= Frank Bracht =

American film and music editor

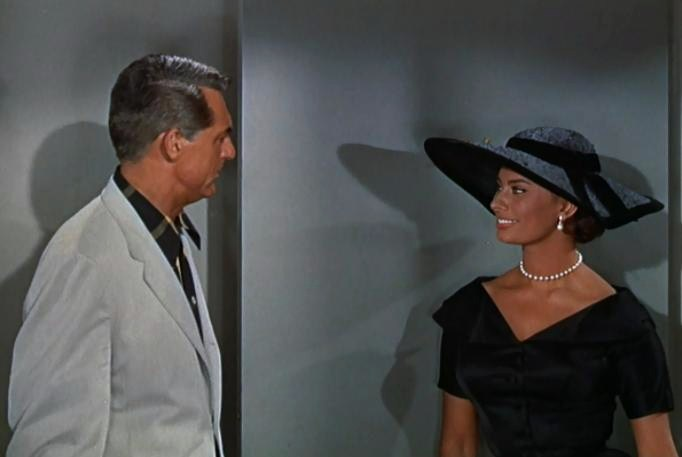
- Cary Grant-Sophia Loren in Houseboat trailer
- Born: January 7, 1910; Idaho, U.S.
- Died: September 26, 1985 (aged 75); Burbank, California, U.S.
- Occupation: Film editor

Frank Belton Bracht (January 7, 1910 – September 26, 1985) was an American film and music editor. He was nominated for the Academy Award for Best Film Editing in 1968 for The Odd Couple.

== Selected filmography (as editor) ==
- White Christmas (1954)
- Funny Face (1957)
- Hud (1963)
- The Odd Couple (1968)
- Plaza Suite (1971)
- Conrack (1974)
- Mandingo (1975)
- The Duchess and the Dirtwater Fox (1976)
- Sidewinder One (1977)
- Goin' Coconuts (1978)
- Something Short of Paradise (1979)
