= Providence Hospital (Wallace, Idaho) =

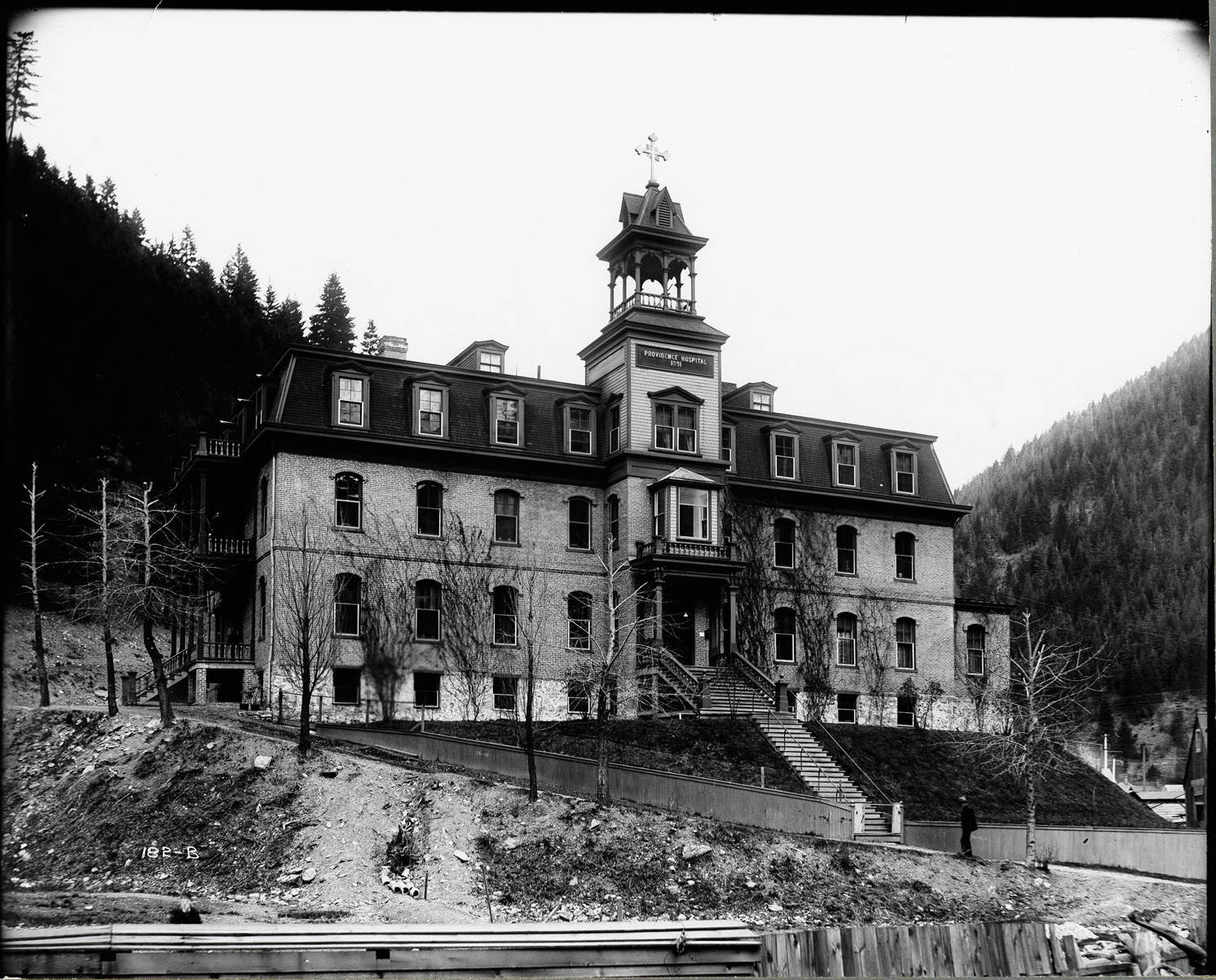
- Providence Hospital in 1909

Geography
- Location: Wallace, Idaho, United States
- Coordinates: 47.473258972168°N 115.91438293457°W

History
- Opened: 1891
- Closed: 1968

Links
- Lists: Hospitals in Idaho

Providence Hospital was a hospital in Wallace, Idaho, United States, opened in 1891. It was established by the Sisters of Providence, a Roman Catholic order of nuns from Montreal, and part of the Providence Hospital System. It closed in 1968 due to aging facilities.

The hospital survived a 1910 fire that severely damaged the city of Wallace. A statue of Jesus of the Sacred Heart, which sat in the first-story window of the hospital, has been missing for several decades as of 2011.

The actress Lana Turner, was born Julia Jean Turner, on February 8, 1921, at Providence Hospital.
