= Ronald Pellar =

American hypnotist and fraudster (born 1920)

Ronald Pellar (February 5, 1930 – June 1, 2013) was an American hypnotist and fraudster who performed under the stage names Ronald Dante and Dr. Dante and who was briefly married to actress Lana Turner. He was convicted of or pleaded guilty to several criminal offenses, including mail fraud in connection with his operation of the diploma mill Columbia State University and attempted murder for trying to contract for the murder of another hypnotist and entertainer. As of 2006, he had been listed in the Guinness Book of World Records for 20 years for having been paid the highest-ever lecture fee. He was known by as many as 40 aliases, including Phil Harris, Earl Clevenger, and Bonnie Ritchie.

== Early life ==
Pellar gave different accounts of his age and personal history. In a 2006 interview, Pellar said he was born in 1920; this birthdate is consistent with the age of 49 that was reported in 1969, when he married Lana Turner. In 1985 he was reported to be 57 years old, indicating a birth date in 1927 or 1928. In 2003 he was reported to be 73 years old and in 2004 he was reported to be 74 years old, indicating a birth date in 1929 or 1930.

In a 2006 interview he said that he spent his early childhood in Kuala Lumpur, where his parents and a sister were killed in an attack by Malaysian insurgents, leaving the 5-year-old Ronald Pellar and his 10-year-old brother, who were sent to live in an orphanage in Chicago. Pellar says that he and his brother "walked away" from the orphanage when he was 11, becoming street children. He claims that he ran a successful street business as a teenager, repackaging cheap watches to appear to be expensive brands and selling them to people who thought they were getting bargain prices because the products were stolen goods. According to Pellar, by the time he was 18 he had amassed enough money to move from the streets to a suite in the Palmer House Hotel, together with other street kids who worked for him. In her autobiography, Lana Turner said that he had told her that he had grown up in Singapore and held a doctorate in psychology from a university there, but reporters who investigated this story had found it to be untrue. His youngest daughter confirms he liked to tell stories to entertain but was born in Illinois and raised by his mother as his father died when he was young. His family owned The Pellar Pie Company in Chicago and The Revere Camera company.

== Career ==
As of the 1960s, Pellar was established as a hypnotist in Los Angeles, where he was photographed in the company of a number of celebrities. He was using the name Ronald Dante and working as a hypnotist in Los Angeles nightclubs as of May 1969, when he became the seventh and last husband of actress Lana Turner. The marriage ended later that year. In her autobiography, Turner said that Pellar stole about $100,000 worth of jewelry from her and defrauded her of about $35,000; she sued him and was awarded $25,000 in damages. Pellar had six other marriages.

A weekend course in hypnotherapy that Pellar conducted in Chicago on June 1–2, 1986, yielded him more than $3 million in lecture fees, giving him a place in the Guinness Book of World Records for having been paid the highest-ever lecture fee.

In 1997 Pellar was convicted of ten counts of criminal contempt for violating an earlier injunction against making false representations, issued in connection with a "permanent makeup" business and a paralegal training academy, and in 1998 he was sentenced to 67 months in prison for the contempt conviction. He fled before the last day of his trial, but was later captured in Mexico and sent to prison. In 1998, the Illinois Attorney General successfully shut down various diploma mills including Columbia State University which were attributed to Pellar. In 2004, while still serving his 1998 contempt sentence, he pled guilty to nine counts of mail fraud associated with the Columbia State University diploma mill operation. For that guilty plea he received a sentence of eight months in prison and was ordered to pay restitution of $45,835 and forfeit a $1.5 million yacht. For the charges he faced, he could have been sentenced to up to 45 years in federal prison and fined as much as $2.25 million.

== Later life ==
In 2006, Pellar was living in a mobile home in Pauma Valley, California, and said he had cancer. He died on June 1, 2013, in Escondido, California, at the age of 83.

Pellar is the subject of a 2010 short documentary film Mr. Hypnotism by Bradley Beesley and NPR reporter Jennifer Sharpe.
