= Detour: A Hollywood Story =

1988 memoir by Cheryl Crane

- Author: Cheryl Crane; Cliff Jahr
- Language: English
- Subject: Cheryl Crane; Lana Turner
- Genre: Memoir
- Publisher: Arbor House
- Publication date: January 20, 1988
- Pages: 334 (first edition)
- ISBN: 978-0-877-95938-0

Detour: A Hollywood Story is a 1988 memoir by Cheryl Crane, the only daughter of actress Lana Turner, with additional writing from Cliff Jahr. In the book, she recounts her early life, including her alleged sexual abuse by her stepfather Lex Barker, and the 1958 killing of Johnny Stompanato during a domestic struggle. She also details her coming out as a lesbian to her parents as a teenager, a fact that had not been publicly disclosed prior. The book went on to become a New York Times Best Seller.

== Synopsis ==
The book follows Crane from her early life in Los Angeles growing up with her mother, Lana Turner, and father, Steve Crane, as well as her alleged sexual abuse by Lex Barker, her mother's fourth husband. It also recounts the 1958 killing of Johnny Stompanato during a domestic struggle between her mother and him at their Beverly Hills home in April 1958, which Crane marks as the point of "detour," after which she engaged in various illegal activities, including running away, using drugs, and attempting suicide in 1962. After her suicide attempt, Crane recounts her working for her father's Los Angeles restaurant, the Luau; her attending Cornell University; and her meeting of Joyce LeRoy, a model with whom she began a long-term relationship.

== Critical response ==
Christopher Schemering of The Washington Post praised the book, referring to it as "a story of horror and healing—a tale so preposterous that it borders on farce. But Crane tells her dense and complex story so straightforwardly—and without a trace of self-pity—that the vicissitudes reverberate into arias of emotion."

Kirkus Reviews noted of Detour:

During one bedroom fracas, when Cheryl was sure Johnny's upraised arm was coming down on Lana, she ran him through with a kitchen knife. What followed was Juvenile Hall, a delinquent youth, and eventually, stability when her father hired her as a hostess and she became a knowledgeable restaurateur. She also hid the fateful stabbing from conscious memory until her adult lesbian love match with a woman named Josh, which has now lasted 18 years. Lana, until her conversion, is seen as an egocentric monster, though the story ends all hearts and flowers. Much of the book is in the voice of research, with Cheryl's own tones breaking through only occasionally. Even so, it's well done and a real grabber.
