= Killing of Johnny Stompanato =

1958 killing ruled to be self-defense

Coordinates: 34.076090°N 118.415260°W

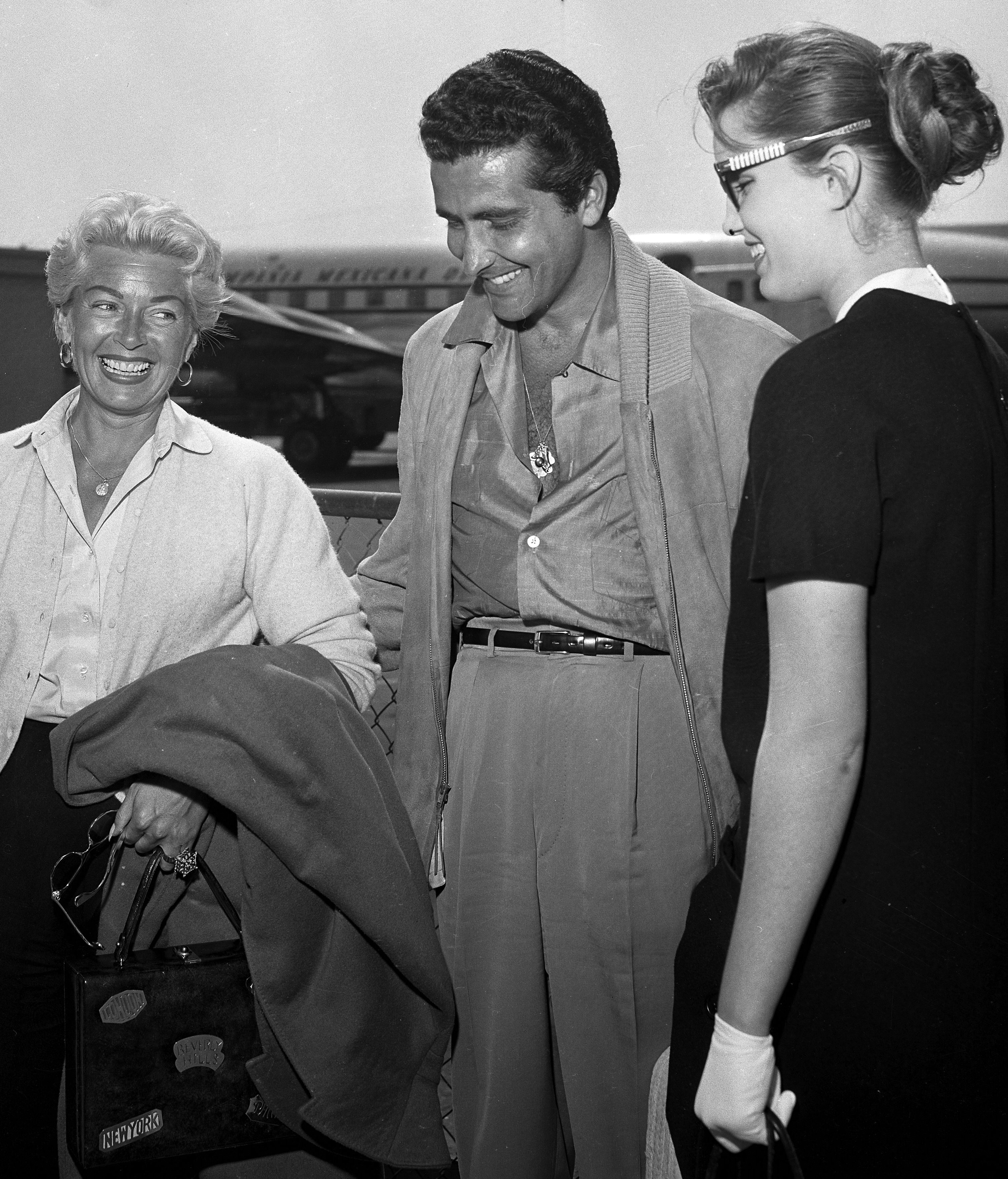
- Lana Turner, Johnny Stompanato and Cheryl Crane, sixteen days before Stompanato's death
- Date: April 4, 1958
- Time: c. 8:30 p.m. (UTC−08:00)
- Location: 730 North Bedford Drive, Beverly Hills, California, U.S.
- Cause: Stabbing
- Motive: Self-defense
- Deaths: Johnny Stompanato
- Inquest: April 11, 1958
- Coroner: Charles Langhauser
- Arrests: Cheryl Crane
- Verdict: Justifiable homicide
- Convictions: None

On the evening of April 4, 1958, 14-year-old Cheryl Crane fatally stabbed 32-year-old Johnny Stompanato, the boyfriend of her mother, actress Lana Turner, at Turner's rented home in Beverly Hills, California, United States. Stompanato, a former Marine and an associate of the Los Angeles crime family, had been in a year-long relationship with Turner that had been rocky and marked with physical abuse.

Crane and Turner alleged that the former had stabbed Stompanato in the stomach when Turner was ushering him out of her bedroom during a violent argument. Crane had heard the fighting and armed herself with a kitchen knife, planning to defend her mother. After Crane turned herself in to police in the early morning hours of April 5, she was held in a juvenile hall. A coroner's inquest was held on April 11, during which the homicide was deemed justifiable and Crane was exonerated of any wrongdoing. She was released in late April and placed under the guardianship of her grandmother.

Public response to the case was divided. Numerous press outlets published articles criticizing Turner, likening her testimony during the inquest to a performance. Though Crane was cleared of wrongdoing, Stompanato's ex-wife filed a wrongful death lawsuit in June 1958 against Turner, Crane and Crane's father Joseph Stephen Crane, on behalf of herself and her son with Stompanato, seeking $750,000 ($6.24 million in 2025) in damages. The lawsuit was eventually settled out of court in 1962 for a sum of $20,000 ($158,334).

In the intervening years, Stompanato's homicide has been the subject of conspiracy theories that Turner had in fact stabbed him, and that Crane had taken the blame to protect her mother, though Crane has denied this. Stompanato's killing has also been depicted in various media and was the inspiration for the novel Where Love Has Gone (1962), as well as its subsequent 1964 film adaptation. In 2007, Time deemed the Stompanato case one of the most notorious crimes of the 20th century.

== Background ==
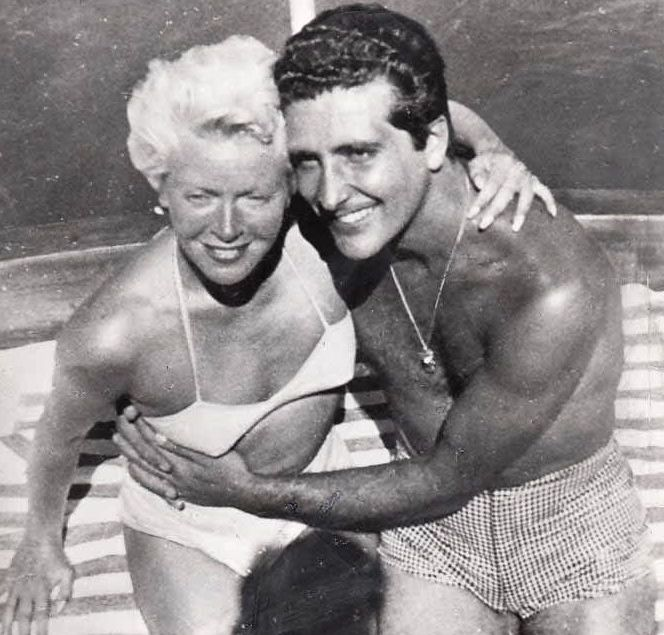
Turner and Stompanato in Mexico in early 1958

While filming the romantic comedy The Lady Takes a Flyer in the spring of 1957, American film actress Lana Turner began receiving phone calls and flowers on the set from a former Marine named Johnny Stompanato, using the name "John Steele." Turner claimed she was unsure of how Stompanato obtained her phone number, but that she learned in later press that allegedly he collected the phone numbers of various Hollywood actresses, including June Allyson, Anita Ekberg and Zsa Zsa Gabor. Stompanato pursued Turner aggressively, sending her various lavish gifts. "Thoroughly intrigued" by his forthrightness, Turner began casually dating Stompanato. Unbeknownst to her at the time, Stompanato had close ties to the Los Angeles underworld and was an associate of gangster Mickey Cohen.

Over the following months, Turner and Stompanato carried on a tempestuous relationship filled with violent arguments, physical abuse inflicted upon her by him and repeated reconciliations. Turner claimed that on one occasion Stompanato drugged her and took nude photographs while she was unconscious, potentially to use as blackmail.

In September 1957, while Turner was filming Another Time, Another Place in London, Stompanato disrupted the production and violently choked Turner before being forced off the set by her co-star, Sean Connery. Turner phoned Scotland Yard after the incident, and ultimately had Stompanato deported from the United Kingdom. They subsequently reconciled, and spent January and February 1958 vacationing in Mexico before returning to the U.S. In March 1958, Turner attended the Academy Awards to observe her nomination for Peyton Place and present the award for Best Supporting Actor. Stompanato, angry that she had attended the ceremony without him, assaulted Turner when she arrived home.

== Homicide ==
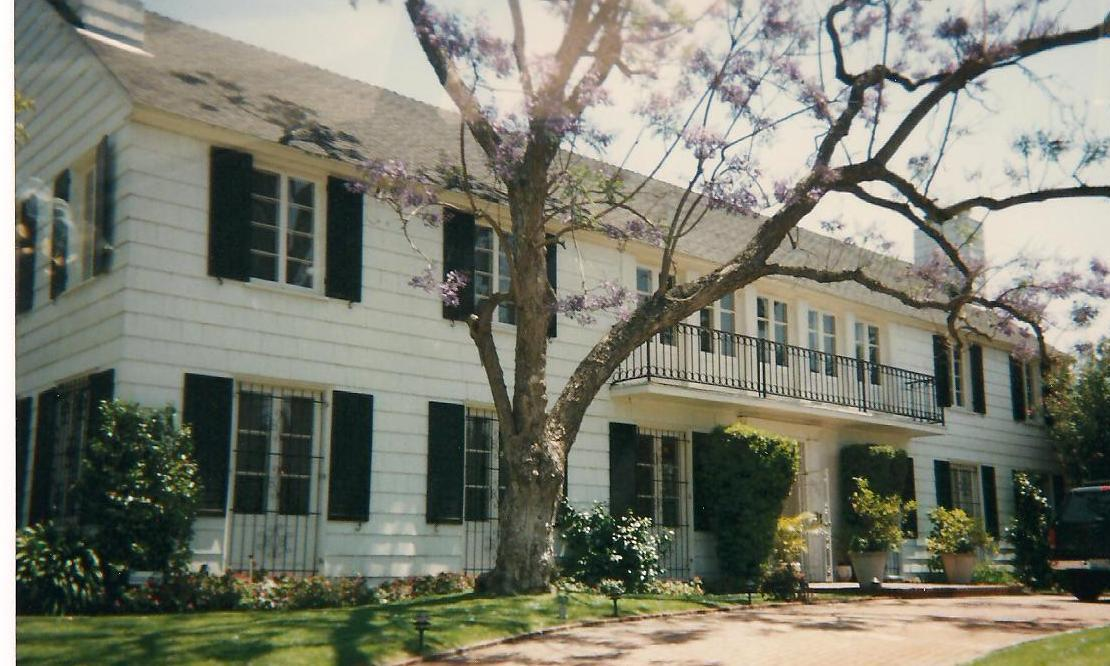
Turner's Beverly Hills residence, where Stompanato was killed

At approximately 8:00 p.m. on April 4, eight days after the Academy Awards ceremony, Stompanato arrived at Turner's rented home at 730 North Bedford Drive in Beverly Hills, California, which she had just begun leasing a week prior. The two began arguing heatedly in the bedroom, during which Stompanato threatened to kill Turner, her daughter and her mother, as well as making "gangster threats" that involved breaking Turner's bones and slashing her face with a straight razor. Turner's daughter, Cheryl Crane, had briefly entered the room during the argument, but was urged by Turner to stay out of it. In the midst of the ensuing argument, Turner broke off her relationship with Stompanato and asked him to leave the house.

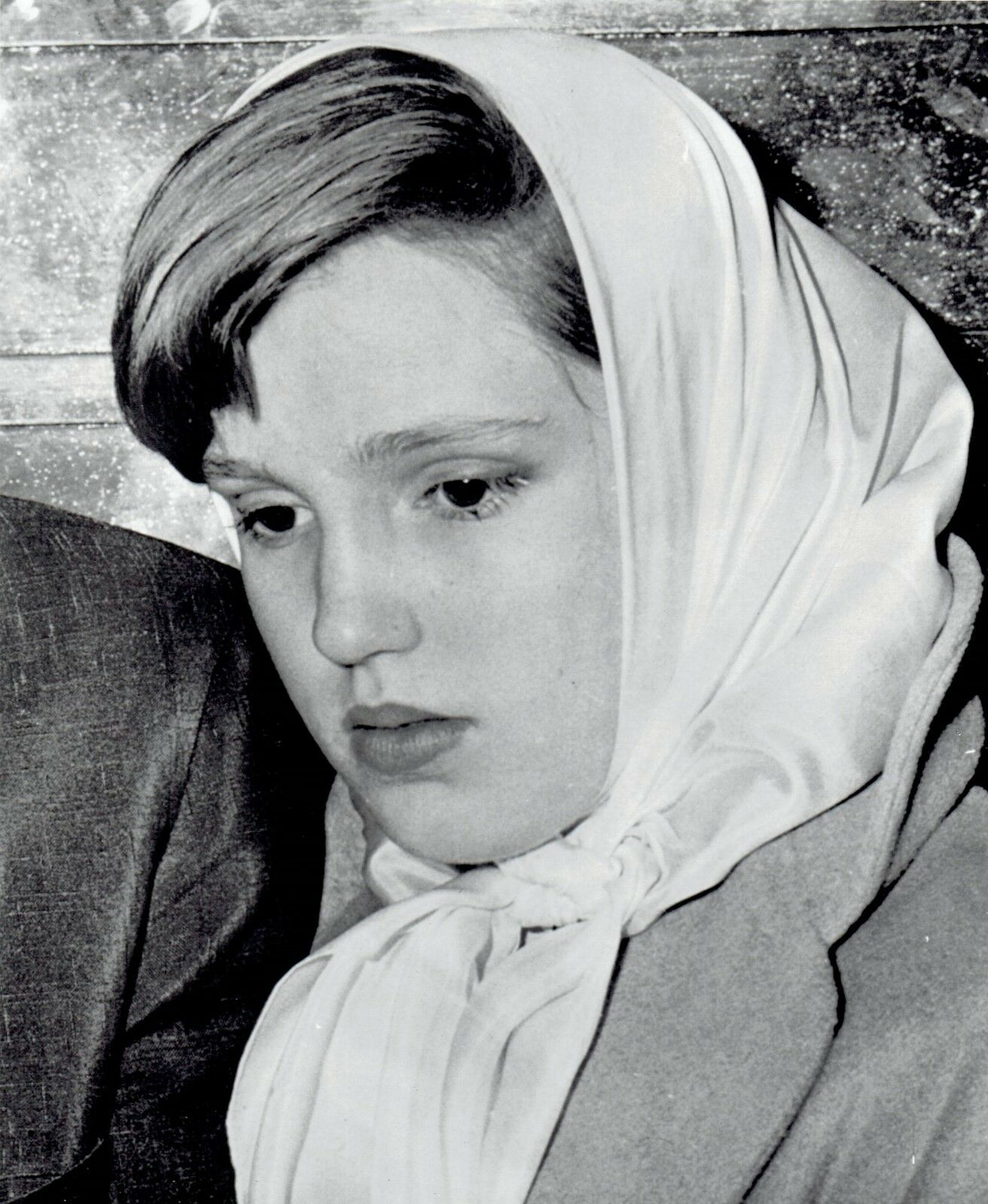
Crane shortly after her arrest

Fearing that Turner's life was in danger, Crane, who had been watching television in an adjacent room, grabbed a kitchen knife and ran to her mother's defense. Crane recalled the incident in 2012:

There's a knife on the counter. I picked it up ran back up the stairs. Her door suddenly flies open. I see John coming toward me. He's got his hand up... I raised the knife and he walks right into it. And he looked at me. And he said, 'My God, Cheryl, what have you done?'"

Turner corroborated this, stating that Crane, who had been listening to the couple's fight behind the closed door, stabbed Stompanato in the stomach when Turner attempted to usher him out of the bedroom. Turner initially believed Crane had punched him, but realized he had been stabbed when he collapsed and she saw blood on his shirt. Per official police accounts, Crane left the room, placing the knife on a "small marble-topped table" and rushed to phone her father, Joseph Stephen Crane. Meanwhile, Turner called for a doctor, who arrived at the house shortly after; the doctor attempted to revive Stompanato with an adrenaline injection and an artificial respirator. Unable to obtain a pulse, the doctor called for emergency services, thereby notifying the police, and Stompanato was subsequently pronounced dead at the scene.

An autopsy conducted by Charles Langhauser shortly after revealed Stompanato's death was caused by a single knife wound that penetrated his liver, portal vein and aorta, resulting in massive internal hemorrhaging.

== Confession ==
Police Chief Clinton Anderson, who arrived at Turner's home shortly after emergency medical services, stated that Turner had pleaded to him, "Please, let me say I did it," after Crane had confessed to the stabbing to her father, who had also arrived at the house. Within one hour of the homicide, Turner and her ex-husband had retained attorney Jerry Giesler to represent their daughter.

In the early morning hours of April 5, Crane was surrendered at the Beverly Hills Police Department, where she was booked on a holding charge. There, she gave a formal statement to Anderson, detailing her hearing Stompanato's threats against her mother, and her subsequent stabbing of him in the bedroom doorway. After Crane had provided her statement, Turner, Stephen and Giesler left the station house at the insistence of police, as the press had already "gathered like vultures outside." In the interim pending further legal proceedings, Crane was held in a juvenile hall.

== Legal proceedings ==
=== Pre-detention hearing ===
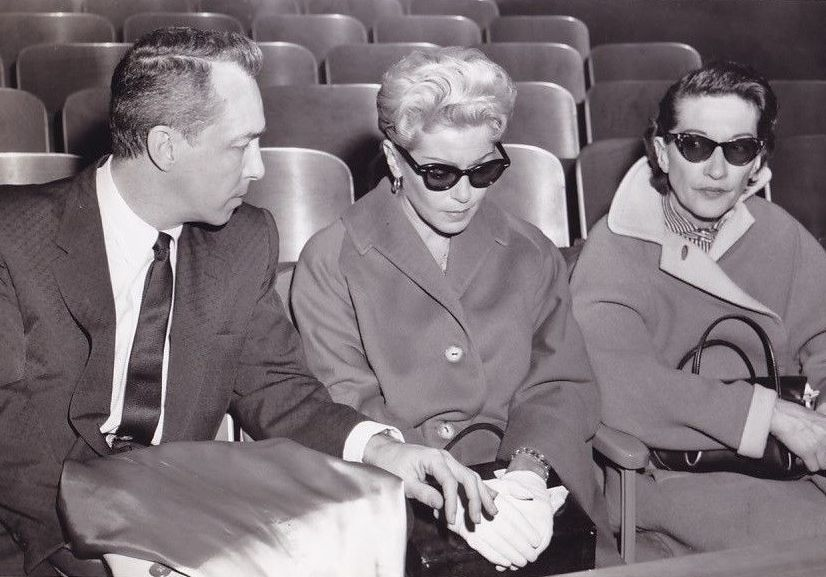
Stephen Crane, Lana Turner, and Mildred Turner attend pre-detention hearing, April 8, 1958

On April 7, 1958, a juvenile pre-detention hearing was held under Judge Donald O'Dell which was attended by Turner, her mother Mildred and ex-husband Stephen. The hearing was closed to the public. That same day, Turner attempted to file an application for Crane's release into the custody of Mildred, Crane's grandmother. Turner's application was denied, however, as the judge felt that Crane would "be better protected by remaining in custody pending the hearing [for Stompanato's murder]."

A follow-up juvenile detention hearing was scheduled for April 24 in Santa Monica to determine whether Crane permanently remain a ward of the juvenile court. During the ruling, it was noted by press that Crane took the decision "without any show of emotion." Upon her dismissal, she was again relocated to a juvenile hall pending further proceedings. Simultaneous to this pre-detention ruling, numerous love letters between Stompanato and Turner were published in the press.

=== Coroner's inquest ===
Due to Turner's high profile and the fact that the killing involved her teenage daughter, the case quickly became a cause célèbre. Over one hundred reporters and journalists attended the April 11 coroner's inquest, described by attendees as "near-riotous".

Cohen, Stompanato's friend and associate, was called as the first witness, but refused to provide testimony as he feared he might be implicated in the crime, and also refused to identify Stompanato's body in photographs. While he was questioned, Stephen Trusso, a spectator and friend of Stompanato, interrupted the proceedings by screaming, "I want to testify!" Trusso went on to claim that Crane killed Stompanato in a lover's quarrel because she was infatuated with him, and that she was jealous of her mother. His request to testify on the stand was denied by the judge. The second witness, Clinton Anderson, testified that he was "satisfied" with Crane's confession. Joseph B. Payne, a Beverly Hills police officer who was dispatched to the residence on the night of the killing, also testified; on the stand, Payne recounted his arrival at Turner's home that night, where he was met by Crane's father, who had placed a call to the police himself.

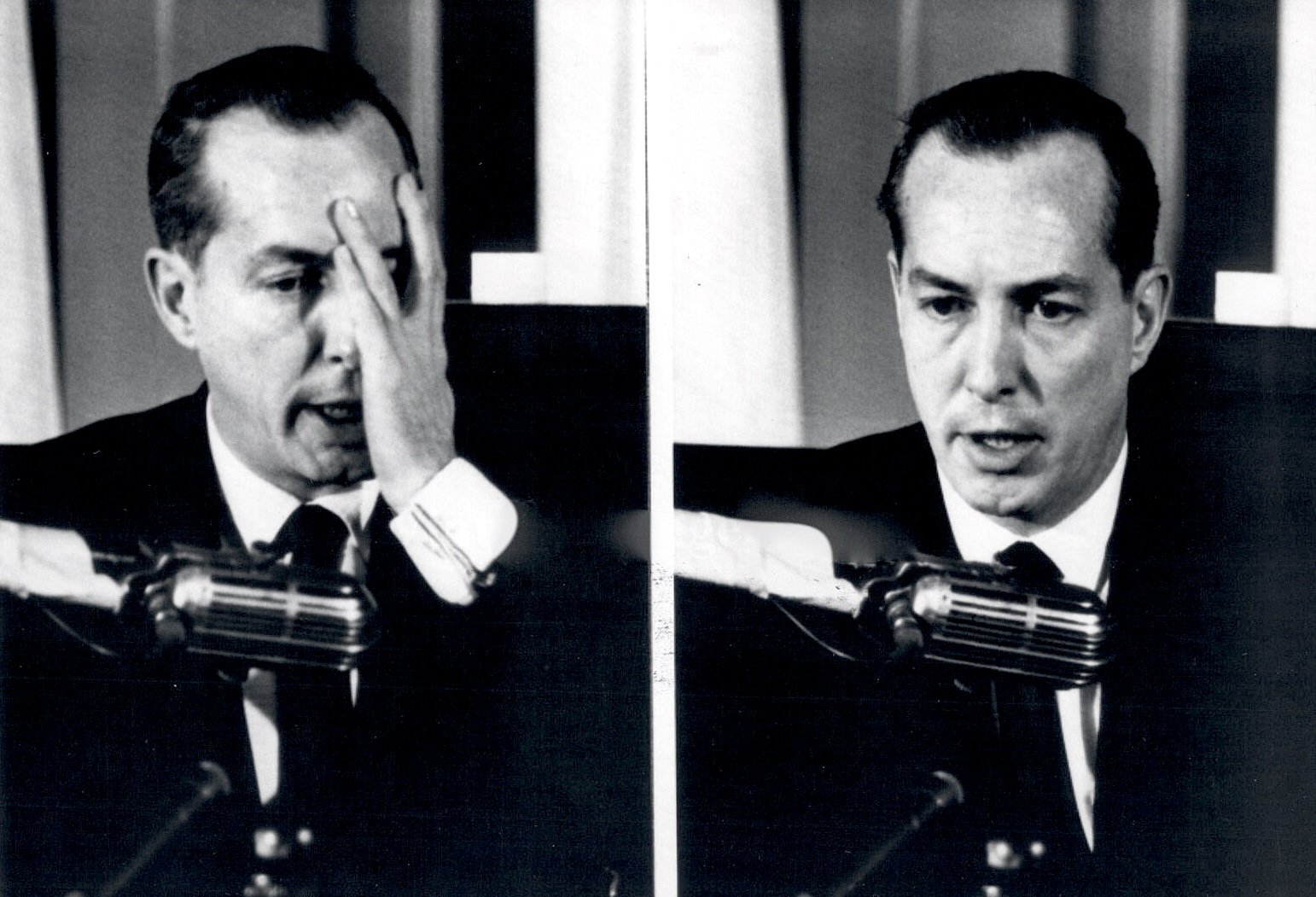
Crane's father, Stephen, testifying at the inquest

Additional testimony was provided by Crane's father and grandmother. Stephen testified that he had received a frantic phone call from Crane the night of the stabbing, and quickly drove to Turner's home. Mildred, whose own husband (Turner's father) was murdered in 1930, also briefly took the stand, but was so visibly upset that she was excused from further testimony. Beverly Hills police captain Ray Borders provided further testimony regarding Crane's official statement given at the Beverly Hills station house. Several law enforcement officials, as well as Turner, Stephen and Giesler, were present, and Borders attested that the version of events as told by Crane was consistent upon repeated questioning. Crane herself did not attend the inquest. In her absence, a written statement by Crane was read aloud, which recounted her overhearing of the argument, her acquiring the knife from the kitchen and the eventual stabbing of Stompanato in her mother's bedroom. "He kept threatening her and I thought he was going to hurt her, so I went into the room and I stuck him with the knife," she said. "He screamed and asked what I was doing. I ran out of the room."

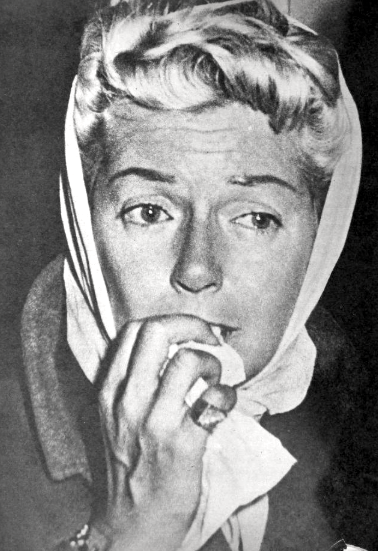
Turner on the stand

Despite the voluminous testimony from others, a report of the inquest in The Philadelphia Inquirer noted that Turner's was "the highlight of a circus-like hearing." When she took the stand, a "hush fell over the crowd as the famous actress sat down, removed one white glove, and filled her lungs with a deep, steady intake of air." She began her testimony by recounting a shopping trip she had taken with Stompanato around 2:00 p.m. on the day of his death, culminating in the argument between them that began around 8:00 p.m. in her home. Recalling the moment Crane stabbed him, Turner stated: "I was walking toward the bedroom door, and he was right behind me, and I opened it, and my daughter came in. I swear, it was so fast, I—I truthfully thought she had hit him in the stomach. The best I can remember, they came together and they parted. I still never saw a blade." Throughout her 62 minutes of testimony, Turner was noted by reporters as nearly collapsing from anxiety. She described Stompanato's final moments, which consisted of "the most horrible noises in his throat and gasping." Upon finishing her testimony, Turner returned to Giesler, collapsing in tears.

After four hours of testimony and approximately twenty-five minutes of deliberation, the coroner's jury deemed Stompanato's killing a justifiable homicide, and Crane would not be prosecuted. Crane remained a temporary ward of the court until April 24, when a juvenile court hearing was held, during which presiding Judge Allen T. Lynch expressed concerns over her receiving "proper parental supervision." This hearing, unlike the coroner's inquest, was closed to the public. Crane was ultimately released to the care of her grandmother, and was ordered to regularly visit a psychiatrist alongside her parents.

== Aftermath ==
=== Public response ===
Immediately following Crane's exoneration, her father told reporters of the Los Angeles Times that he planned to fight Turner for full custody of his daughter. Reporter Jack Jones wrote: "Although Jerry Giesler, Lana's attorney, reported that the actress herself will battle for custody of the couple's daughter... there seemed to be no ill feeling between Crane and his glamorous ex-wife." Though Turner and her daughter were cleared of any wrongdoing, public opinion on the trial was varied, and the day after Crane's exoneration, the Times published a scathing article stating that Turner possessed a "lack of almost any reference to moral sensitivity in the presence of a child," concluding that "Cheryl isn't the juvenile delinquent. Lana is." Other publications intimated that Turner's testimony at the inquest was a performance; Life magazine published a photo of Turner testifying in court with stills of her in courtroom scenes from three films she had starred in. Columnist Florabel Muir wrote in the New York Daily News that Turner "played the most dramatic and effective role of her long screen career here today at the coroner's inquest." The scandal coincided with the release of Another Time, Another Place, which was met with poor box-office receipts and a lackluster critical response.

=== Wrongful death lawsuit ===
Stompanato's brother Carmine, who attended the inquest, alleged afterward that he felt Turner "failed to tell the whole truth" and that law enforcement had "made up their mind right from the start that Johnny deserved to die." Stompanato's ex-wife, Sarah Ibrahaim, filed a wrongful death suit of $750,000 (equivalent to $8,400,000 in 2025) in damages against Turner, Crane and Stephen on behalf of herself and then-7-year-old John Jr., her son with Stompanato. In the suit, it was implied that Turner was responsible for stabbing Stompanato and that her daughter had taken the blame. The suit alleged that Stephen arrived at Turner's residence prior to Stompanato's death and failed to summon proper medical assistance.

Depositions in the wrongful death suit began in June 1958. William Jerome Pollack, the attorney overseeing the case, presented evidence suggesting that Stompanato had been stabbed while lying down, which conflicted with the accepted version of events. An amended complaint alleged that the plaintiff was uncertain "whether it was Defendant Cheryl Crane or Defendant Lana Turner who did the actual stabbing, or whether the one assisted the other therein. Because of said doubt, plaintiff allege[d] that both of said defendants did inflict the said stab wound in the body of John Stompanato." Representing Turner, Crane and Stephen in the wrongful death lawsuit was attorney Lowell Dryden. On June 23, 1958, the three, accompanied by Dryden, visited Pollack's law offices in Los Angeles for a meeting. Pollack subsequently reported: "Cheryl told [me] yesterday that she cannot recall actually stabbing Stompanato in the pink-carpeted bedroom of Lana's rented Beverly Hills mansion." Pollack further stated that Crane could not recall providing the written statement read on her behalf during the April 11 inquest.

The suit was submitted to the court of Walter Allen, and was eventually settled out of court for a reported $20,000 in May 1962.

=== Legacy and conspiracy theories ===
Stompanato's homicide has had an enduring presence in true crime popular culture and mythology, and was named one of the "crimes of the century" by Time in 2007. Film historian Sam Staggs noted that it "belongs in the same pantheon of foul deeds as the Fatty Arbuckle rape trial in 1921, the ambiguous death of Marilyn Monroe in 1962, and the murder trial of O. J. Simpson of 1995."

In the intervening years, Stompanato's homicide has been subject to an oft-repeated conspiracy theory that Turner in fact killed him, and that Crane had taken culpability for her mother, claiming self-defense. This theory was exacerbated when Eric Root, a hairdresser of Turner's, claimed in a 1996 memoir that Turner confessed to him that she had stabbed Stompanato during their domestic struggle. According to Root, Turner made the confession to him years later at the Plaza Hotel, after the two saw a television program referencing the case; Root claims that Turner allegedly blurted out: "I killed the son of a bitch, and I would do it again." He also stated that Turner urged to him to reveal this to the public should she die before him, in order to clear her daughter's name. Crane, however, denied this claim, responding in 1999: "This idea that Root had in his book is so far-fetched... You know, everybody has something they want to sell. I guess it was the only way he could get his book published."

Additionally, Metro-Goldwyn-Mayer stylist Sydney Guilaroff noted in his 1996 memoir that, on the morning of Stompanato's murder, he had run into Turner leaving the Pioneer Hardware store in Beverly Hills; during a brief exchange, Guilaroff alleged that when he asked Turner what she was doing at the hardware store, she responded: "We needed a new knife." Guilaroff further claimed that he visited Turner the following day, and that she collapsed in his arms, sobbing, and said, "Did you ever dream this could happen? And with the very knife I bought yesterday." In her own autobiography, Turner conceded that she and Stompanato had gone shopping for kitchen utensils for Turner's new home the week he died, and that he had in fact been stabbed with one of the carving knives he had purchased.

In 2012, 48 Hours presented a special profiling the case, which featured conversation between several historians, Cheryl Crane, and John Ibrahim, Stompanato's son. Ibrahim contested that Turner's testimony was "all lies" and that she "could have got an Academy Award," to which Crane responded:

She was not acting. She was terrified. I know my mother... she was fighting for her child... The jury came back with a verdict of justifiable homicide. I have come up against this question hundreds of times. "Didn't your mother do it? Isn't she really the one that did it?" I killed John Stompanato... And I didn't do it to cover it up for my mother. What mother would do this to her child? To make her child live through her life knowing that she's killed somebody and have to live with it. Who would do that? Not my mother. Not the woman I know.

== Cultural depictions ==
A 1962 novel by Harold Robbins entitled Where Love Has Gone was inspired by Stompanato's death, followed by a 1964 film adaptation starring Susan Hayward and Bette Davis. In 1987, Woody Allen's movie, September, features a thinly veiled reference to the death, in the relationship between daughter Mia Farrow and mother Elaine Stritch, with Allen assigning guilt to Stritch (Turner). In the movie This Boy's Life, the case is being shown on the TV news while Robert De Niro and Leonardo DiCaprio watch, intending to show that Leonardo DiCaprio's character pretends to do the same to defend his mother from her abusive husband. In November 2009, Sara Davies premiered a radio drama for BBC 4 titled A Night with Johnny Stompanato by playwright Jonathan Holloway, which is based on the case. Brazilian writer Sonia Coutinho has a short story called "Every Lana Turner Has Her Johnny Stompanato", which narrates the life of a woman who compares and identifies deeply with Turner, especially in regards to her relationship with Stompanato.

== Sources ==
- Bakken, Gordon Morris; Farrington, Brenda (2009). Women Who Kill Men: California Courts, Gender, and the Press. Lincoln, Nebraska: University of Nebraska Press. ISBN 978-0-803-22657-9.
- Basinger, Jeanine (1976). Lana Turner. New York: Pyramid Publications. ISBN 978-0-515-04194-1.
- Erickson, Hal (2017). Any Resemblance to Actual Persons: The Real People Behind 400+ Fictional Movie Characters. Jefferson, North Carolina: McFarland. ISBN 978-1-476-62930-8.
- Feldstein, Ruth (2000). Motherhood in Black and White: Race and Sex in American Liberalism, 1930–1965. Ithaca, New York: Cornell University Press. ISBN 978-0-8014-8438-4.
- Fischer, Lucy (ed). (1991). Imitation of Life. New Brunswick, New Jersey: Rutgers University Press. ISBN 0-8135-1644-7.
- Lewis, Jon (2017). Hard-Boiled Hollywood: Crime and Punishment in Postwar Los Angeles. Los Angeles: University of California Press. ISBN 978-0-520-28432-6.
- Morella, Joe; Epstein, Edward Z. (1971). Lana: The Public and Private Lives of Miss Turner. New York: Citadel Press. ISBN 0-8065-0226-6.
- Root, Eric (1996). The Private Diary of My Life with Lana. Beverly Hills, California: Dove Books. ISBN 978-0-787-10773-4.
- Staggs, Sam (2009). Born to Be Hurt: The Untold Story of Imitation of Life. New York: Macmillan. ISBN 978-0-312-37336-8.
- Turner, Lana (1982). Lana: The Lady, the Legend, the Truth (1st ed.). New York: Dutton. ISBN 0-525-24106-X.
- Valentino, Lou (1976). The Films of Lana Turner. Seacaucus, New Jersey: Citadel Press. ISBN 978-0-8065-0553-4.
- Wayne, Jane Ellen (2003). The Golden Girls of MGM: Greta Garbo, Joan Crawford, Lana Turner, Judy Garland, Ava Gardner, Grace Kelly and Others. New York: Carroll & Graf. ISBN 0-7867-1303-8.
- Yapp, Nick (2006). Fletcher, Mark (ed.). True Crime. Parragon Incorporated. ISBN 978-1-405-48540-1.
