= Where Love Has Gone =

Where Love Has Gone may refer to:

- Where Love Has Gone (novel), a 1962 novel by Harold Robbins
- Where Love Has Gone (film), a 1964 film drama based on the novel
  - "Where Love Has Gone" (song), a song from the film nominated for an Academy Award for Best Original Song
- Where Love Has Gone (album), a 1964 album by Jack Jones

== See also ==
- Where Has Love Gone? (disambiguation)
