= El Retiro School for Girls =

Former girls' boarding school

Coordinates: 34.3098073°N 118.4469445°W

El Retiro School for Girls was a boarding school for girls who had been made wards of the Los Angeles County court system. It opened in 1919 and closed in 1961.

== Establishment ==
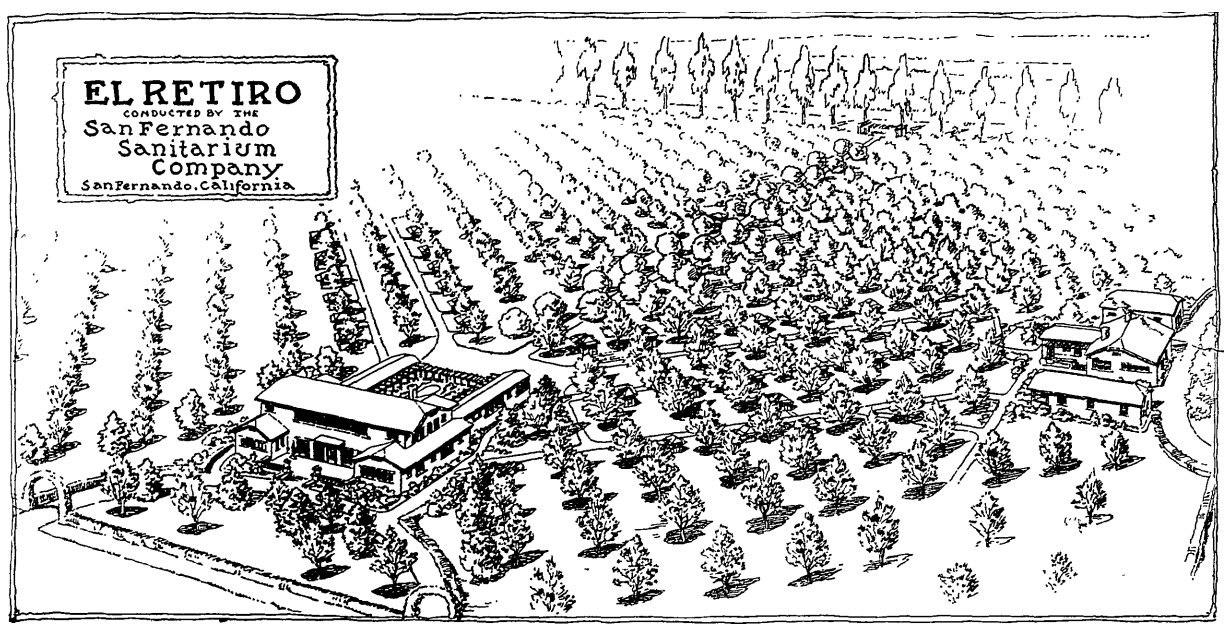
El Retiro sanitarium, under private ownership, 1916

The school was established on the former property of the San Fernando Sanitarium Company, which in 1915-16 had offered "A Beautiful Remedial Home for the Treatment of Non-Infectious Diseases" like "anemia, stomach and bowel troubles, nervous disorders, liver and kidney affections, rheumatism, eczema and other skin diseases, high and low blood pressure, certain forms of heart disease, constipation and emaciation." The property was purchased for $15,000 by the county in 1918–19 to provide an "institution for unfortunate women" over the objections of many residents, the Olive Growers Association and County Supervisor Jonathan S. Dodge, who represented the district.

The county institution was not put into operation until 1919, when it was described as an "industrial home" for girls. The school was organized under county auspices by Miriam Van Waters of the Los Angeles Juvenile Court to provide a shelter for girls who "were in no way connected with crimes or misdemeanors." Besides academic subjects, the girls "composed and typed a school paper" and were able to study typing, shorthand, booking and business methods, as well as home management, cooking, table service, laundering and similar subjects. They even put on a fashion show.

In 1919 authorities of the Los Angeles City School District rejected complaints by San Fernando businessmen against the attendance by El Retiro girls at San Fernando High School. There were no complaints in future years.

== Shakeup and walkout ==
In 1927 and before El Retiro girls had a large measure of self-government and, according to Assistant City Schools Superintendent Helen Watson-Pierce: "did all the work on the place, took care of the poultry, the cows, worked in the laundry, and their services were equivalent to home economics courses such as are given" elsewhere in the city. She and Elizabeth Wood, head of the department of psychology for the school district, said that the girls had shown an "exceptionally high order of conduct and scholarship." Orfa Jean Shontz, acting probation officer for the juvenile court, said that the girls were not considered delinquent and the school was in no way a correctional institution. In August 1927, however, a change of emphasis was made with the discharge of the school's director, Alma Holtzschuh, and a number of other faculty members. This action led to a boycott by more than forty girls, many of whom walked some eighteen miles toward their destination of juvenile hall in Downtown Los Angeles before they were picked up by county automobiles and driven the rest of the way, The girls complained that the new superintendent, Rosemary B. Good, took away their self-government, began a stricter disciplinary system and posted male guards around the campus. Only ten or eleven girls remained behind. Charles D. Lusby, chairman of the county's Probation Committee, later said that Holtzschuh has been fired for insubordination and other failures. He also said the girls were not properly trained and that "there was too much freedom without thought of necessary discipline."

A grand jury investigation followed, and in November 1927 Helen Montigrifo, a prominent Los Angeles social worker, was appointed superintendent, with the school to be reopened and operated "along lines agreeable to county officials, members of the county Probation Committee and the girl inmates themselves."

== End of the school ==
In 1956, Retiro was described as "an institution for youngsters who have run afoul of the law," and school Principal Robert Sayette said the girls were "social delinquents," not criminals, most of them being chronic truants, runaways and "incorrigibles." The school had a maximum capacity of 48, and in March 1956 there were 32 residents. There were no guards, but gates were locked and a watchman was on duty at night. Parents were allowed to visit once a month, and the girls could go home at most two days a month. They lived in three cottages, with a county probation officer as a "mother." They had access to a swimming pool, a softball field and a gymnasium that doubled as an auditorium. Besides academic subjects, they could learn homemaking, typing, crafts and journalism.

The Sylmar Civic Association carried on a campaign in 1956 to end the use of the El Retiro site as a "county corrective institution" and instead turn it into a city park. They objected to the school on the grounds it was a "bad influence," especially since a new junior high school was to be built nearby. El Retiro officials agreed that the school should be relocated because some of the buildings were more than fifty years old and its ten acres of land and "over-all facilities were simply too large for its small enrollment." A $15.8 million bond issue for improvements to the county's juvenile-aid program was approved by voters on November 7, 1956, and forty-five girls were moved from El Retiro in February 1961 to a new $2.23 million Las Palmas School for Girls in the city of Commerce.

The former campus is now part of the Sylmar Recreation Center, a public park operated by the City of Los Angeles, California.

== Runaways ==
Two El Retiro girls, both wards of the court, were sufficiently notable to receive newspaper publicity when they absconded from the campus without permission. They were:

- Yvena Gorham, 17, who had assertedly suffered injuries to her body when she was given a "medicated" bath at the juvenile hall and whose mother sued on her behalf for the "painful burns" and "permanent scars" she received, was discovered missing on June 14, 1920. She was said to have gone to San Francisco with "an elderly woman."
- Cheryl Crane, 16-year-old daughter of actress Lana Turner, was placed in El Retiro for "psychiatric therapy" in March 1960 after she had fatally stabbed her mother's boyfriend, Johnny Stompanato, on April 4, 1958, when defending Turner from his attack. Six weeks later she and two other girls climbed a 10-foot wall and fled. They were eventually returned to the school after Cheryl telephoned her father, restaurateur Steven Crane. Five weeks later, Cheryl again fled the campus with two other girls. They walked into Sylmar and were driven by a new acquaintance to Beverly Hills, where they were taken into custody a few hours later after being seen near Cheryl's grandmother's home. Cheryl was released from the school in January 1961 to the custody of her mother and stepfather, Frederick D. May.
