= Where Love Has Gone (film) =

1964 film by Edward Dmytryk

- Original film poster
- Directed by: Edward Dmytryk
- Written by: John Michael Hayes
- Based on: Where Love Has Gone; 1962 novel by Harold Robbins
- Produced by: Joseph E. Levine
- Starring: Susan Hayward; Bette Davis; Mike Connors; Joey Heatherton; Jane Greer; DeForest Kelley; George Macready
- Cinematography: Joseph MacDonald
- Edited by: Frank Bracht
- Music by: Walter Scharf
- Production company: Embassy Pictures
- Distributed by: Paramount Pictures
- Release date: November 2, 1964 (United States)
- Running time: 114 minutes
- Country: United States
- Language: English
- Box office: est. $3,600,000 (US/ Canada)

Where Love Has Gone is a 1964 American Technicolor drama film in Techniscope made by Embassy Pictures, Joseph E. Levine Productions and Paramount Pictures. It was directed by Edward Dmytryk and produced by Joseph E. Levine from a screenplay by John Michael Hayes based on the 1962 novel of the same name by Harold Robbins. The music score was by Walter Scharf, the cinematography by Joseph MacDonald and the costume design by Edith Head.

The film stars Susan Hayward and Bette Davis with Mike Connors, Joey Heatherton, Jane Greer, DeForest Kelley, Anne Seymour, and George Macready.

== Plot ==
Newspaper headlines blare that 15-year-old Danielle Miller (Joey Heatherton) has murdered a man, Rick Lazich, who was the latest lover of her mother, Valerie Hayden (Susan Hayward). When Dani's father, Luke Miller (Mike Connors) is informed of the situation, he travels to see his daughter, and describes the events that led to the tragedy.

Near the end of World War II, Army Air Forces hero Luke is in San Francisco for a parade in his honor, and meets Valerie at an art show where one of her works is being exhibited. He is invited to dinner by Valerie's mother, Mrs. Gerald Hayden (Bette Davis), who offers him a job and dowry as an enticement for him to marry Valerie. He storms from the house but is followed by Valerie who says she is unable to go against her mother's wishes but that she admires him for having refused her. A relationship develops and the two marry, although a former suitor, Sam Corwin (DeForest Kelley), predicts that the marriage will fail.

As time passes, Luke becomes a successful architect and refuses another offer of employment from his mother-in-law, but the influential and vindictive Mrs. Hayden uses her contacts in the banking industry to ensure that he is refused loans to help him build his business. He relents and accepts a position in her company. Dani is born, but the couple's relationship begins to deteriorate with Luke declining into alcoholism and Valerie engaging in a promiscuous lifestyle. The marriage ends when Luke actually finds her having sex with another man and Mrs. Hayden insists Valerie divorce him. Years pass and Dani eventually becomes her mother's rival for the same man.

Back in the present, Dani claims that she was defending Valerie against attack, and when the case is brought to court, a verdict of justifiable homicide is ruled. An investigation into where to place Dani begins, but neither investigator Marian Spicer (Jane Greer) nor psychiatrist Dr. Jennings (Anne Seymour) can persuade Dani to open up about her feelings. When Mrs. Hayden petitions for custody of Dani and she still refuses to reveal herself, Valerie maintains that Dani was trying to kill her, and that Rick was only killed when he tried to defend Valerie. Valerie returns home and commits suicide, and after her death Luke tries to help Dani rebuild her life.

== Cast ==
- Susan Hayward as Valerie Hayden Miller
- Bette Davis as Mrs. Gerald Hayden
- Mike Connors as Maj. Luke Miller (as Michael Connors)
- Joey Heatherton as Danielle Valerie Miller
- Jane Greer as Marian Spicer
- DeForest Kelley as Sam Corwin
- George Macready as Gordon Harris
- Anne Seymour as Dr. Sally Jennings
- Willis Bouchey as Judge Murphy
- Walter Reed as George Babson
- Ann Doran as Mrs. Geraghty
- Bartlett Robinson as Mr. John Coleman
- Whit Bissell as Prof. Bell
- Anthony Caruso as Rafael

== Critical response ==
Although Robbins and the studio refused to acknowledge a connection, some publications such as Newsweek noted the similarities between the movie and the real-life case of Cheryl Crane, the daughter of actress Lana Turner, who in 1958 stabbed and killed her mother's boyfriend, Johnny Stompanato, claiming that she was defending Turner from attack. Newsweek wrote that the case seemed to have influenced the "foolish story" and described it as "a typical Harold Robbins pastiche of newspaper clippings liberally shellacked with sentiment and glued with sex".

The Saturday Review criticized the script saying that it "somehow manages to make every dramatic line (particularly when uttered by Susan Hayward) sound like a caption to a cartoon in The New Yorker.

The film is listed in Golden Raspberry Award founder John Wilson's book The Official Razzie Movie Guide as one of the 100 Most Enjoyably Bad Movies Ever Made.

== Nominations ==
The theme song "Where Love Has Gone" by Jimmy Van Heusen and Sammy Cahn was nominated for both an Academy Award and Golden Globe in the "Best Song" category. Jack Jones sang the theme song on his album of the same name.
