= Joseph Crane =

Joseph Crane may refer to:

- Joseph Halsey Crane (1782–1851), attorney, soldier, jurist, and legislator
- Joseph Stephen Crane (1916–1985), American actor and restaurateur
