= Lana: The Lady, the Legend, the Truth =

1982 book by Lana Turner

- Author: Lana Turner
- Language: English
- Subject: Lana Turner
- Genre: Memoir
- Publisher: Dutton
- Publication date: September 1, 1982
- Pages: 311 (first edition)
- ISBN: 0-525-24106-X

Lana: The Lady, the Legend, the Truth is a 1982 memoir by the American actress Lana Turner, published by Dutton. In it, Turner recalls her early life, her rise to stardom and personal troubles over the course of her career.

== Synopsis ==
Turner recounts her early life growing up in Wallace, Idaho, and San Francisco, followed by her discover at age 16 in Hollywood by William R. Wilkerson. She recalls various anecdotes and personal experiences as a rising star for Metro-Goldwyn-Mayer, as well as her numerous romances, marriages and miscarriages. She also narrates the 1958 killing of Johnny Stompanato by her daughter, Cheryl Crane, during a domestic struggle, followed by her later career in film and television.

== Critical response ==
Wayne Lawson of The New York Times wrote of the book,

As these books go, Lana is pretty bad, in fact often bad enough to be good. For example, she says of her most recent husband: "His name was Ronald Dante - and still is, I suppose. His real name was Ronald Pellar, and he called himself a doctor, although of what I'm not exactly sure." Now, is that supposed to be funny? Sarcastic? Ingenuous? All of these? None of these? Who can tell? Miss Turner is not solely at fault for this dreadfully written book; in the last paragraph she declares that it is a collaborative effort, and the copyright is held by Eltee Productions and Hollis Alpert, the film critic and editor. However, in the last sentence she insists on taking full responsibility for her life and her book. So be it.

The New York Times's Janet Maslin noted, "Lana Turner, though she isn't reflective or articulate even by movie star standards, has led a life that's a soap opera daydream. And she's got a one-of-a-kind Hollywood story to tell." Kirkus Reviews praised the book, writing, "Lana tells it all unpretentiously, unweepily; and the result--with nice little attacks along the way on Richard Burton, Ezio Pinza, Otto Preminger, Harold Robbins et al.--is a good old-fashioned celeb memoir, popcorn with spice, unashamedly Hollywood."
