= Helen Gilbert (actress) =

American actress (1915–1995)

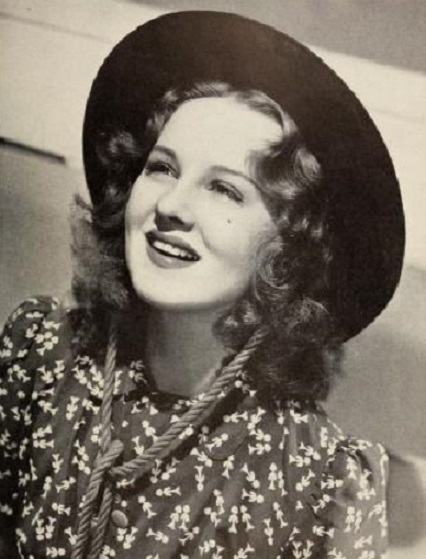
- Born: Helen Amelia Gilbert; July 4, 1915; Pennsylvania, U.S.
- Died: October 23, 1995 (aged 80); Los Angeles, California, U.S.
- Occupation: Actress
- Years active: 1939-1958
- Spouse(s): Mischa Bakaleinikoff (1936–1939, divorce); Bill Marshall (1941? - 1941?); Seymour J. Chotiner (1942–1942, divorce); Victor Makzoumet (1945–1948, his death); Johnny Stompanato (1949–1949, divorce); James E. Durant (1950–1952, divorce); M.O. Bryant (1952–1987, his death)

Helen Amelia Gilbert (July 4, 1915 – October 23, 1995) was an American film actress and musician.

== Early years ==
Gilbert was born in Pennsylvania and was raised in Warren, Ohio. By the time she was 10, she and her family lived in Superior, Wisconsin, where her father ran a music store. Her father gave her a cello when she was 10, and "By the time she was 15, she was known in the northwest as a cello prodigy." Her talent with that instrument earned her a scholarship to the Curtis Institute of Music and an opportunity to play at the Hollywood Bowl.

== Film ==
Gilbert was described in a May 22, 1939, syndicated newspaper column as "The only studio musician who ever became an actress." Writer Paul Harrison explained that Gilbert had been playing cello in the Metro-Goldwyn-Mayer orchestra for two years when test director Fred M. Wilcox saw her "and asked why she was behind the camera instead of in front of it." (Two other newspaper articles, published August 6, 1939, and April 21, 1939, contained similar anecdotes, but in them W. S. Van Dyke was the director who noticed Gilbert playing cello. A fourth article, published February 18, 1940, says that film executive Winfield Sheehan "was impressed by her beauty, gave her a screen test and started her on her way to pictures.")

Gilbert's film debut came in Andy Hardy Gets Spring Fever (1939) when she played Andy Hardy's dramatics teacher. That same year, she was featured as a patient who had trouble with her vision in The Secret of Dr. Kildare (1939).

Gilbert's romantic proclivities may have cost her a role in The Wizard of Oz (1939). Eila Mell wrote in the book Casting Might-Have-Beens: A Film by Film Directory of Actors Considered for Roles Given to Others: "Helen Gilbert was the first choice to play Glinda the Good Witch. The actress was interested and it seemed the deal would be made. After she ran off with Howard Hughes, the role was up for grabs." Her activities with Hughes may have cost Gilbert more than that one film role. David J. Hogan’s book The Wizard of Oz FAQ nots: “Shortly after a young MGM contract player named Helen Gilbert was cast as Glinda, the inveterate girl-chaser Howard Hughes spirited her away for a fling … Gilbert was suspended, and the studio, which had been building her as a leading lady, allowed her contract to lapse after 1940.”

== Personal life ==
Gilbert's first husband was orchestra leader Mischa Bakaleinikoff. They divorced November 18, 1939.

She was married to actor Bill Marshall, probably during 1941, although the dates are uncertain.

On December 8, 1942, she was divorced by Seymour J. Chotiner, an attorney in Hollywood, California. They had been married five months. Her next husband was restaurateur Victor Makzoumet, married in 1945, who died in 1948.

On February 19, 1949, she married Johnny Stompanato. They divorced five months later in July 1949.

Her sixth (and penultimate) husband was Nevada casino manager James E. Durant. They married on September 28, 1949, in Las Vegas or in February, 1950 in Coolidge, Arizona. In June 1952, she went to court, asking for monthly alimony and a restraining order against Durant, alleging that he attempted to throw her out of an 11th floor window. Durant, meanwhile, claimed that the couple had been divorced already. Gilbert maintained that the decree in Arizona was invalid, but she dropped her suit after marrying M.O. Bryant, who was "associated with her in a Hollywood cafe." They remained married until his death in 1987.

All of the unions were childless.

== Death ==
Gilbert died of cardiac arrest in Los Angeles on October 23, 1995, at age 80. Her body was cremated, and her ashes were scattered at sea.

== Filmography ==
- Andy Hardy Gets Spring Fever (1939)
- The Secret of Dr. Kildare (1939)
- Florian (1940)
