= Where Has Love Gone? =

Where Has Love Gone? may refer to:

- Where Has Love Gone? (film) or Gde ty, lyubov'?, a 1980 Soviet film
  - Where Has Love Gone? (album), a soundtrack album from the film, or the title song, by Sofia Rotaru
- "Where Has Love Gone?" (song), a song by Holly Johnson

== See also ==
- Where Love Has Gone (disambiguation)
