= Where Love Has Gone (novel) =

1962 novel by Harold Robbins

- First edition (publ. Simon & Schuster)
- Author: Harold Robbins
- Language: English
- Publisher: Simon & Schuster
- Publication date: 1962
- OCLC: 424801
- LC Class: PZ3.R53564 Wh

Where Love Has Gone is a 1962 novel by Harold Robbins. It was first published on October 16, 1962.

It was the basis for a film of the same name in 1964, with Robbins's work adapted for the screen by John Michael Hayes. It was produced by Joseph E. Levine for Paramount Pictures and was directed by Edward Dmytryk.

There were parallels between the events in the book and the death of Johnny Stompanato, Lana Turner's boyfriend.
