= Cheryl Crane =

American writer (born 1943)

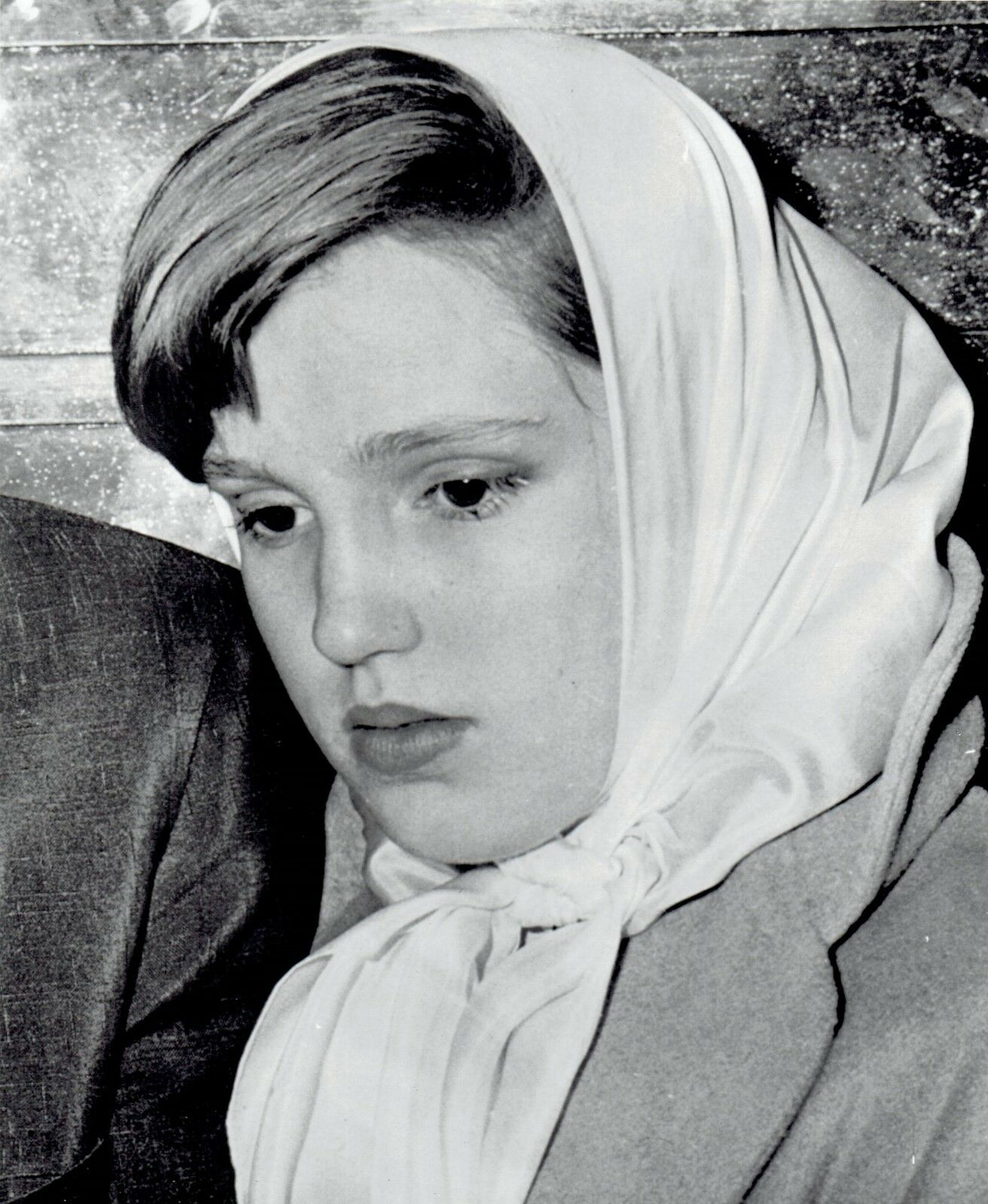
- Crane in 1958
- Born: Cheryl Christina Crane; July 25, 1943 (age 83); Los Angeles, California, U.S.
- Occupations: Writer; real estate broker; model
- Spouse: Joyce LeRoy (m. 2014)
- Parents: Joseph Stephen Crane (father); Lana Turner (mother)

Cheryl Christina Crane (born July 25, 1943) is an American former model, real estate broker, author, and the only child of actress Lana Turner. Her father was Turner's second husband, actor-turned-restaurateur Steve Crane. She was the subject of significant media attention in 1958 when, at fourteen years old, she stabbed to death her mother's lover, Johnny Stompanato, during a domestic struggle; she was not charged, and his death was deemed a justifiable homicide.

In the years following Stompanato's death, Crane's rebellious behavior was well-documented in the press. Upon graduating from high school she briefly worked as a model before entering the restaurant business, working at the Luau, a Polynesian restaurant owned by her father. She would later study restaurant management and hospitality at Cornell University, hoping to become a restaurateur.

In the 1980s, Crane shifted her career focus to real estate, becoming a broker in Hawaii and Palm Springs, California. In 1988, she authored a memoir titled Detour: A Hollywood Story, and in 2011 published her first fiction work, The Bad Always Die Twice.

== Biography ==
=== Early life ===
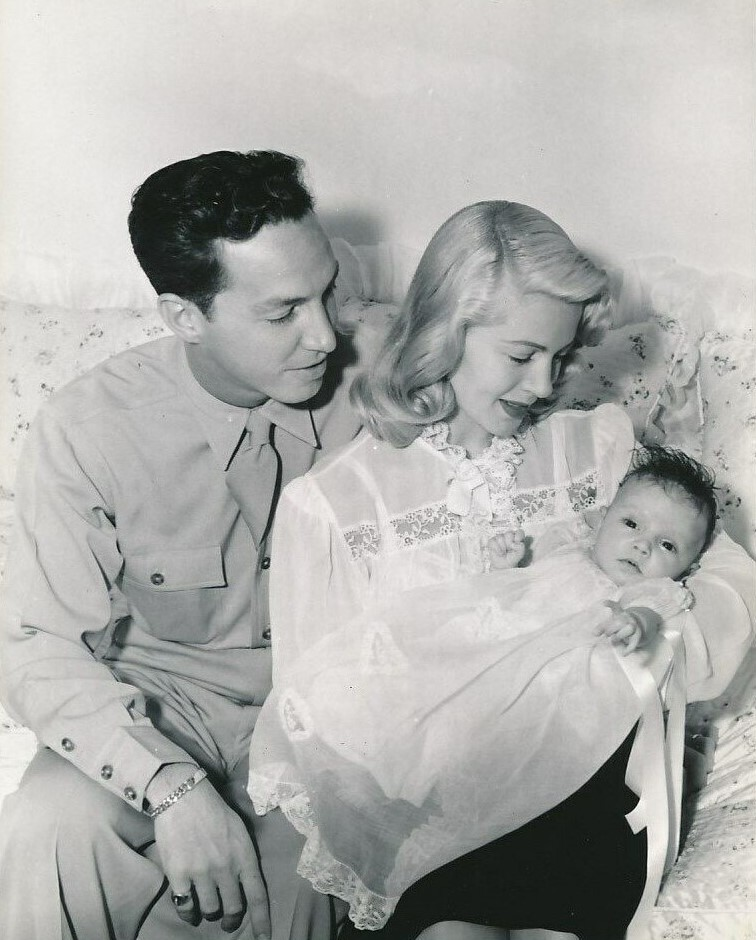
Stephen Crane, Lana Turner, and Cheryl Crane, eight weeks old

Cheryl Crane was born July 25, 1943, at Hollywood Hospital in Los Angeles to actress Lana Turner and actor Steve Crane. At the time of her birth, Crane suffered near-fatal erythroblastosis fetalis due to her mother's Rh-negative blood. Her parents divorced in August 1944. She was raised primarily in Bel Air, Los Angeles, and described her early life as: "famous at birth and pampered silly." She attended St. Paul the Apostle School, a Catholic primary and secondary school in Los Angeles, and later Emerson Junior High School. In 1957, she began attending the Happy Valley School in Ojai, California.

=== Killing of Johnny Stompanato and aftermath ===
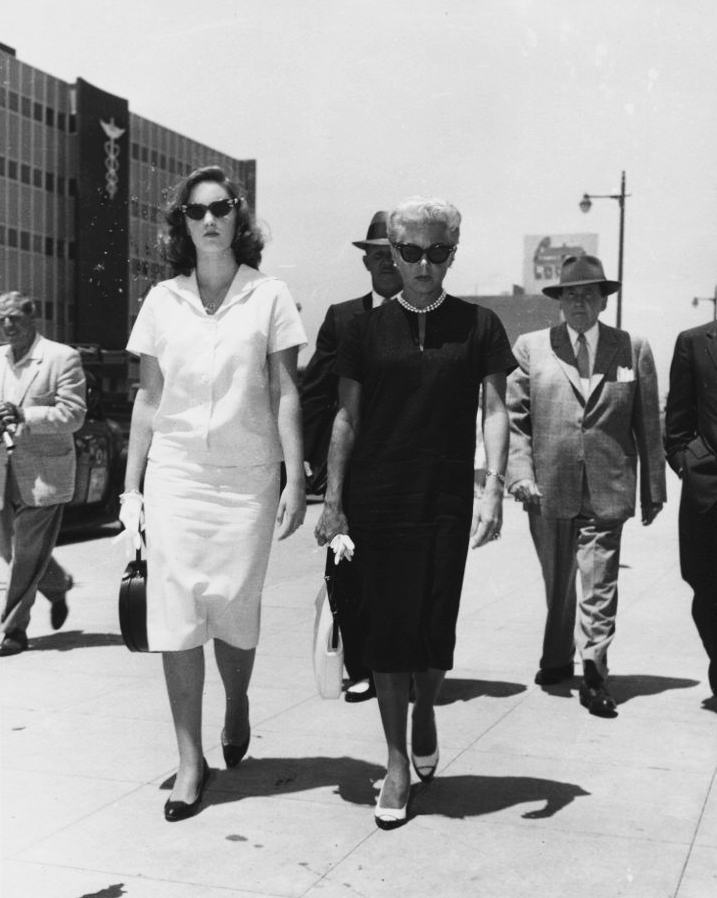
Crane with mother Lana Turner at her juvenile court hearing, April 1958

On April 4, 1958, at age 14, Crane stabbed her mother's boyfriend, Johnny Stompanato, to death. The killing was ruled a justifiable homicide: she was deemed to have been protecting her mother during a domestic altercation. Stompanato was well known to have been abusive and extremely jealous of Turner, and a physical confrontation in 1957 with actor Sean Connery, her co-star in Another Time, Another Place, resulted in his immediate deportation from the UK.

Following Stompanato's death, Crane was made a ward of the State of California and was placed in the El Retiro School for Girls in Sylmar, Los Angeles, for "psychiatric therapy" in March 1960. Six weeks later she and two other girls climbed a 10-foot (3.0 m) wall and fled. They were eventually returned to the school after she telephoned her father. Five weeks later, she again fled the campus with two other girls. They walked into Sylmar and were driven by a new acquaintance to Beverly Hills, where they were taken into custody a few hours later after being seen near her grandmother's home. Crane was released from the school in January 1961 to the custody of her mother and stepfather, Frederick D. May. Worried she was still suffering from the trauma of Stompanato's death, Turner sent Crane to the Institute of Living in Hartford, Connecticut.

=== Later life and career ===
Standing at 5 feet 9 inches (1.75 m), Crane initially decided to pursue a career as a model after high school, and briefly modeled for several Los Angeles women's clothing stores. Crane then decided to work for her father at his restaurant, the Luau, on Rodeo Drive. "It took the restaurant business to get me out of my shyness," she would later say. "To realize I could greet people in the Luau and they wouldn't bite me. A restaurant is make-believe too, you know. It's always opening night." After working as a hostess for several years, Crane decided to pursue a career in the restaurant business; she enrolled in the School of Hotel Administration at Cornell University where she studied restaurant and hospitality management for one year.

In April 1970, Crane was detained by the Los Angeles Police Department (LAPD) when three half-grown marijuana plants were discovered in the back seat of her car. In that same year, she began dating model Joyce LeRoy, to whom she was introduced by Marlon Brando at a party held by Wally Cox. After the closure of the Luau in 1979, Crane relocated with LeRoy to Honolulu, Hawaii, where she worked as a real estate broker. Around 1986, the couple relocated to San Francisco.

In 1988, Crane published a memoir titled Detour: A Hollywood Story, in which she discussed the Stompanato killing publicly for the first time and admitted to the stabbing. She further alleged that she was subject to a series of sexual assaults at the hands of her stepfather and her mother's fourth husband, actor Lex Barker. The book went on to become a New York Times Best Seller. In it, Crane also publicly revealed how at age thirteen she had come out as a lesbian to her parents:

I knew from the age of 6 ... for years [my mother would] never mention it to anyone. Her friends knew that she knew, but that was it. With this book, we bit into it. Mother said to [Joyce] and me, 'Don't you realize what you are letting yourselves in for?' Then she understood this was my book not her book. One day we were on this subject (homosexuality) and she asked me, 'You mean it wasn't something I did? It wasn't environmental?' And when I said 'No,' I saw a huge weight being lifted from her.

Turner would later state that she regarded Crane's partner, LeRoy, "as a second daughter." Upon Turner's death in 1995, Crane and LeRoy inherited Turner's personal effects as well as $50,000. The majority of her estate (estimated in court documents to be worth $1.7 million [$3.9 million in 2025 dollars]) was left to Carmen Lopez Cruz, her maid and companion for 45 years. Crane challenged the will and Lopez claimed that the majority of the estate was consumed by probate costs, legal fees, and medical expenses.

In 1998, Crane was diagnosed with breast cancer and successfully underwent a double mastectomy as well as radiation and chemotherapy to treat the cancer.

Crane published her second memoir in 2008, titled Lana: The Memories, the Myths, the Movies, which focused on her mother. She wrote her first fictional work, a mystery novel titled The Bad Always Die Twice, which was published in 2011. As of 2011, Crane resided in the Palm Springs, California area working in real estate. In 2013 and 2014 she published two additional novels, Imitation of Death and The Dead and the Beautiful. Both are mystery novels featuring Nikki Harper, a real estate agent featured in The Bad Always Die Twice.

On November 14 2014, Crane married LeRoy, her longtime partner, after having been together for over four decades. Crane still worked as a real estate agent as of 2018.

== Publications ==
- Crane, Cheryl (1988). Detour: A Hollywood Story. New York: Arbor House/William Morrow. ISBN 0-87795-938-2.
- Crane, Cheryl (2008). Lana: The Memories, the Myths, the Movies. Philadelphia, Pennsylvania: Running Press. ISBN 978-0-762-43316-2.
- Crane, Cheryl (2011). The Bad Always Die Twice. London: Kensington Publishing Corporation. ISBN 978-0-758-25886-1.
- Crane, Cheryl (2013). Imitation of Death. London: Kensington Publishing Corporation. ISBN 978-0-758-28906-3.
- Crane, Cheryl (2014). The Dead and the Beautiful. London: Kensington Publishing Corporation. ISBN 978-1-617-73301-7.

== Sources ==
- Crane, Cheryl (1988). Detour: A Hollywood Story. New York: Arbor House/William Morrow. ISBN 0-87795-938-2.
- Morella, Joe; Epstein, Edward Z. (1971). Lana: The Public and Private Lives of Miss Turner. New York: Citadel Press. ISBN 0-8065-0226-6.
- Turner, Lana (1982). Lana: The Lady, the Legend, the Truth (1st ed.). New York: Dutton. ISBN 0-525-24106-X.
