= Cry of the Werewolf =

1944 film by Henry Levin

- Directed by: Henry Levin
- Screenplay by: Griffin Jay; Charles O'Neal
- Story by: Griffin Jay
- Produced by: Wallace MacDonald
- Starring: Nina Foch; Stephen Crane; Osa Massen; Blanche Yurka; Barton MacLane
- Cinematography: L. William O'Connell (as L.W. O'Connell)
- Edited by: Reg Browne
- Color process: Black and white
- Production company: Columbia Pictures
- Distributed by: Columbia Pictures
- Release date: August 17, 1944
- Running time: 63 minutes
- Country: United States
- Language: English

Cry of the Werewolf is a 1944 American horror film directed by Henry Levin and starring Nina Foch, Stephen Crane, Osa Massen, Blanche Yurka and Barton MacLane.

It was Levin's directorial debut and has been called "a cheerful knock off of Cat People."

== Plot ==
A Romani princess descended from Marie LaTour has the ability to change into a wolf at will, just like her late mother. When she learns that Marie LaTour's tomb has been discovered, she decides to use her talent to kill everyone who knows the location, because it is a sacred secret that only her people are allowed to know.

== Cast ==
- Nina Foch as Princess Celeste LaTour
- Stephen Crane as Robert 'Bob' Morris
- Osa Massen as Elsa Chauvet
- Blanche Yurka as Bianca
- Barton MacLane as Police Lt. Barry Lane
- John Abbott as Peter Althius (uncredited)

== Production ==
The film was developed with the working title of Bride of the Vampire. Filming started May 1944.

== Release ==
Cry of the Werewolf premiered in New York on August 17, 1944. Cry of the Werewolf was issued theatrically as a double feature with The Soul of a Monster and continued to receive theatrical re-releases into the early 1950s. Both films were released on the same disc in the Columbia Horror region B blu-ray boxset in the UK from Powerhouse/Indicator.

== Reception ==
Michael R. Pitts described the film's reception as "mixed" on its initial release. The New York Times stated that "[T]here is absolutely nothing original in this utterly suspenseless film" while a reviewer in The Sunday Times Signal (Zanesville, Ohio) proclaimed that "Horror fans are in for a thrill [with] the story of dread voodoo murders, horrifying tribal rites and a fantastic feast of death in which lovely and talented Nina Foch plays the woman werewolf whose mother terrorized millions and because of whose sins Nina can never marry."

Variety wrote "its stodgy story and lack of originality or excitement is barely offset by a fair outlay in budget and production."

In 1962, Joe Dante included the film in his list of worst horror films list in Famous Monsters. Dante stated the film was "a pretty dismal hunk of nonsense. Tho Nina Foch as the werewoman killed people left & right it was still a bore."

== See also ==
- List of American films of 1944

== Sources ==
- Pitts, Michael R. (2014). Columbia Pictures Horror, Science Fiction and Fantasy Films, 1928-1982. McFarland. ISBN 978-0786457663.
- Dante, Joe Jr. (July 1962). "Dante's Inferno". Famous Monsters. Vol. 4, no. 3. Central Publications, Inc.
