= Another Time, Another Place (1958 film) =

Film by Lewis Allen

- Theatrical release poster
- Directed by: Lewis Allen
- Screenplay by: Stanley Mann
- Based on: Weep No More by Lenore Coffee
- Produced by: Lewis Allen; Smedley-Aston
- Starring: Lana Turner; Barry Sullivan; Glynis Johns; Sean Connery; Sidney James; Terence Longdon
- Cinematography: Jack Hildyard
- Edited by: Geoffrey Foot
- Music by: Douglas Gamley
- Production companies: Lanturn Productions; Kaydor Productions Ltd.
- Distributed by: Paramount Pictures
- Release date: 2 May 1958 (United States)
- Running time: 98 minutes
- Countries: United Kingdom; United States
- Language: English

Another Time, Another Place is a 1958 melodrama film directed by Lewis Allen and starring Lana Turner, Barry Sullivan, Glynis Johns, Sean Connery, Sidney James and Terence Longdon. The screenplay by Stanley Mann is based on Lenore Coffee's 1955 novel Weep No More.

== Plot ==
American reporter Sara Scott is working in London during the last year of the Second World War and begins an affair with a British reporter named Mark Trevor. Sara is conflicted on whether to marry her rich American boss Carter Reynolds or Mark. Finally, she chooses Mark, only to find that he is married and has a son back in his hometown. The two separate shortly thereafter, then decide to stay together and work out their problems.

As the war in Europe is ending, Mark is killed in a plane crash, sending Sara into mourning and into a mental sanatorium for a few months. After her release, Carter convinces her to catch a ship back to New York City and work for him. However, before her departure, she goes to Trevor's very scenic seaside hometown in Cornwall and lives for a time with his young widow Kay and son as she works to fashion Mark's war reporting into a book. She is conflicted about telling Kay the truth about her relationship with Mark, but finally does so, causing Kay to emotionally break down and order Sara to leave. However, she makes amends with Sara at the station.

== Cast ==
- Lana Turner as Sara Scott
- Barry Sullivan as Carter Reynolds
- Glynis Johns as Kay Trevor
- Sean Connery as Mark Trevor
- Terence Longdon as Alan Thompson
- Sidney James as Jake Klein
- Martin Stephens as Brian Trevor
- Doris Hare as Mrs. Bunker
- Julian Somers as hotel manager
- John Le Mesurier as Doctor Aldridge
- Cameron Hall as Alfy
- Robin Bailey as Captain Barnes
- Jane Welsh as Jonesy

== Production ==
=== Development ===
The screenplay for Another Time, Another Place was based on the 1955 Lenore Coffee novel Weep No More. Coffee said "It was about a clever woman columnist—called 'Sara Scott Says'—and they got that sexpot Lana Turner to play the lead in the movie. It stunk. It was just dreadful."

The film marked the first feature produced by actress Lana Turner's production company, Lanturn Productions, who co-produced the project with the British company Kaydor Productions Ltd.

=== Filming ===
Location filming in the fishing village in Cornwall that Lana Turner's character visits, named St Giles in the film, was carried out at Polperro. She travels by train and the station she arrives at, also called St Giles in the film, is actually Looe railway station. The final scene of the film is of her train leaving the same station, which still exists but has been much altered since the 1950s. Connery was selected by Turner to play the role of Mark Trevor.

Additional filming took place at Elstree Studios in Hertfordshire.

==== Johnny Stompanato incident ====
During the film's principal photography in Britain, Connery was confronted on-set by gangster Johnny Stompanato, then-boyfriend of Lana Turner, who suspected the actor was having an affair with Turner. Stompanato pointed a gun at Connery and warned him to keep away from Turner. Connery responded by grabbing the gun out of Stompanato's hand and twisting his wrist, causing him to run off the set.

After Stompanato's death, it was rumoured that a Los Angeles mobster held Connery responsible, causing Connery (who was then in Los Angeles to make Darby O'Gill And The Little People (1959) for Walt Disney) to look over his shoulder nervously for a time.

== Release ==
Paramount Pictures initially planned to release Another Time, Another Place in September 1958, but rushed the film's post-production to capitalize on the publicity surrounding the killing of Johnny Stompanato by actress Lana Turner's daughter, Cheryl Crane, on 4 April 1958. The film was released theatrically in the United States on 2 May 1958, less than one month after Stompanato's death.

=== Home media ===
Paramount Home Entertainment released a widescreen edition DVD of the film on 12 July 2005. The Australian distributor Imprint Films released a limited edition Blu-ray on 8 April 2026.

== Reception ==
The Monthly Film Bulletin wrote: "A confected wartime romance, somewhat shakily constructed, and played – apart from Lana Turner's grimly impassioned performance – without style or enthusiasm. Sidney James contributes a few welcome moments of wry humour. The direction is dull and uninteresting."

Kine Weekly wrote: "Lana Turner displays genuine feeling as the grief-stricken Sara, and Glynis Johns leaves nothing to chance as the brave, practical Kay. The two never miss an emotional trick. Barry Sullivan also registers as the high pressure, yet understanding, Carter, and Sidney James furnishes welcome light relief as a seasoned reporter, but Sean Connery's talents are taxed to the full in the unrewarding role of Mark, and a little of Martin Stephens goes a long way as Brian,"

Variety wrote: "A triangle-melodrama set in wartime Britain, Another Time, Another Place, will have its greatest appeal to women; men are likely to wonder what all the agonizing is about."
