= Crime of the century =

Idiomatic phrase

"Crime of the century" is an idiomatic phrase used to describe particularly sensational or notorious criminal cases. In the United States, it is often—though not exclusively—used in reference to the Lindbergh kidnapping. However, the phrase was in popular use much earlier in the 19th century and has been used repeatedly ever since. Other criminal cases that have also been described as the "crime of the century" include the Leopold and Loeb case, the murder of Patrick Henry Cronin, and the Richard Speck case. In Europe, the description is often applied to the Great Train Robbery of 1963.

== See also ==
- Trial of the century
