= Wayne Lawson =

American editor (1932–2026)

Wayne Albert Lawson (1932–2026) was an American editor. He was the executive literary editor of Vanity Fair from 1982 to 2014.
