= Joseph Stephen Crane =

American actor and restaurateur (1916–1985)

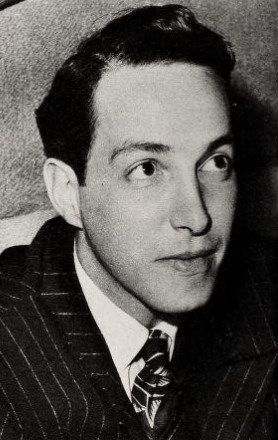
- Crane in 1943
- Born: Joseph Stephenson Crane; February 7, 1916; Crawfordsville, Indiana, U.S.
- Died: February 6, 1985 (aged 68); Pauma Valley, California, U.S.
- Education: Wabash College
- Occupations: Actor, restaurateur
- Spouses: Carol Ann Kurtz (m. 1937; div. 1943) Lana Turner (m. 1942; ann. 1943) (m. 1943; div. 1944) Martine Carol (m. 1948; div. 1953) Helen DeMaree (m. 1961; div. 1962) Leslie Deeb (m. 1969; div. 1978)
- Children: Cheryl Crane

Joseph Stephenson "Steve" Crane (February 7, 1916 – February 6, 1985) was an American actor and restaurateur. A Columbia Pictures actor in the early 1940s, Crane opened the Luau, a popular celebrity restaurant, in 1953 and established a successful 25-year career in the restaurant industry. In addition to his own accomplishments, Crane is often remembered as Lana Turner's twice ex-husband.

== Early life ==
Born Joseph Stephenson Crane in Crawfordsville, Indiana, he was the son of William E. and Katheryn Stephenson Crane. The Crane family was well known in Crawfordsville due to their business, the Stephenson Crane Cigar Store.

In Crawfordsville, Crane was known to family and friends as "Joe". Active in drama and debate, Crane graduated from Crawfordsville High School in 1933. Crane was voted "Most Attractive" by his peers his senior year. Following high school, Crane enrolled in Wabash College, a men's liberal arts college in Crawfordsville. A member of the fraternity Sigma Chi and the dramatic theater Scarlet Masque, Crane graduated with a B.A. in Business in 1937.

Joe Crane and his younger brother, Billy, were on a trip to Mexico City when they decided to visit Hollywood on a whim in the summer of 1937. Crane briefly married Indianapolis native, Carol Ann Kurtz, and managed the family cigar store, but after separating from Kurtz, decided to take his chances in Hollywood in 1939.

== Film career ==
Now known as Stephen, the young Indiana native began his brief film career in 1944. Signed to Columbia Pictures, Crane was cast in the B-picture Cry of the Werewolf. Starring alongside Nina Foch and Osa Massen, Crane starred as a scientist who discovers his father has been killed by a werewolf. The Crime Doctor's Courage (1945) proved to be another murder mystery B-picture. Crane's third and final film appearance was in Tonight and Every Night (1945). Starring Rita Hayworth and Lee Bowman, this World War II musical was nominated for two Academy Awards in 1946. Crane had several lines and walk-on appearances as character Leslie Wiggins, a friend of Bowman's character.

Although he had successfully been involved in local Crawfordsville plays in his youth, Crane was the first to admit that his acting skills were less than par. In 1967, Crane would reflect, "To be honest, I was a very poor actor". Crane's daughter suggests that the abrupt end to her father's acting career may be attributed to his attraction to a Polish ballerina, who turned out to be Columbia Pictures President Harry Cohn’s girlfriend.

== Restaurant career & Kon-Tiki chain ==
In the late 1940s, Stephen Crane in partnership with Al Mathes bought and managed Lucey's New Orleans House, a popular celebrity restaurant, but quickly sold it to live abroad in Europe in 1948. Returning to America in the 1950s, Crane opened The Luau, a Polynesian-themed restaurant on Rodeo Drive in Beverly Hills. Quickly becoming a hotspot, the Luau was known for its tiki decor and its high-profile customers. As the host and owner, Crane became a well-known name in the restaurant industry and tongue in cheek signed his menus as "STEFOOMA, High-Talking Chief of the Luau" Crane’s attempt to keep up with the storied personas of Don the Beachcomber and Trader Vic. Crane's designs on menus, matchbooks, and tableware became synonymous with the popular Polynesian trends of the decade.

Crane expanded his company, Stephen Crane Associates, which at one point included over a dozen different restaurants. The company became most associated with the Kon-Tiki chain of restaurants after he formed a deal with Sheraton Hotels in 1958 to compete against Hilton Hotel's Polynesian restaurants associated with Trader Vic's. This Polynesian-themed chain of restaurants were known for their elaborate decor and precise bar service. Almost every aspect of the elaborate interiors, down to the mugs and napkins, was designed in-house.

Eventually there were Kon-Tikis in Sheraton Hotels for Montreal, Portland, Cleveland, Chicago, Cincinnati, and Honolulu, and potentially others (his obituary read that he had 14 locations in Sheraton Hotels, while also mentioning The Luau and Scam restaurants). Boston's restaurant was called Kon-Tiki Ports, and Crane also operated Ports o' Call restaurants in Beverly Hills, Dallas and Toronto.

California remained his favorite state, where he was also involved with Stefaninos in Beverly Hills, Au Petit Jean in Beverly Hills, and 9000 on Sunset Blvd. in Los Angeles. The Chaparral Club was in Dallas. The Luau and Kon-Tiki restaurants remained popular, iconic restaurants throughout the 1960s and 1970s. Stephen Crane retired after selling The Luau in 1978, after which it was shortly torn down.

== Personal life ==
Stephen Crane was as well known for his high-profile relationships as he was for his successful career. In 1942, Crane met actress Lana Turner at the Mocambo restaurant. Turner later described the meeting in her autobiography:

He mentioned nonchalantly that he was in the tobacco business, in a way that suggested that any kind of business bored him. Certainly it seemed that he had no money worries. We chatted for hours, and by the time he took me home, I was ready to fall in love. With my weakness for a certain kind of good looks, coupled with witty charm, I took him at face value. In no time we were a pair. Only three weeks later he asked me to marry him.

Crane and Turner were married on July 17, 1942, but the happy union was short-lived. Crane had failed to mention that he was not yet divorced from his first wife, Carol Ann Kurtz. Turner quickly annulled the marriage and Crane received a finalized divorce from Kurtz as the marriage mix-up became sensationalized in the gossip columns. After discovering that she was pregnant, Turner remarried Crane in March 1943. Their daughter, Cheryl Crane, was born on July 25, 1943. The marriage did not last and the couple was divorced in August 1944.

In addition to Lana Turner, Crane was involved with many famous women. Crane was seen at hotspots with Ava Gardner and Rita Hayworth in the 1940s and Mamie van Doren in the 1950s. Crane was engaged to starlet Lila Leeds when, in 1948, she was arrested along with actor Robert Mitchum for smoking marijuana. Crane quickly ended the relationship and moved abroad to avoid the scandal.

In 1948, Crane married French sex symbol and actress Martine Carol, famous for her role in Lola Montès (1955) but the couple were divorced in 1953. In the 1960s, Crane married and divorced Helen (Redding) DeMaree and Leslie Deeb.

On April 4, 1958, Crane's 14-year-old daughter, Cheryl, killed Lana Turner's boyfriend, Johnny Stompanato. Sensationalized in the press, the case brought attention to Crane. At the inquest, Crane testified on behalf of his daughter and in the end, the killing was deemed a justifiable homicide.

== Later life ==
After selling the Luau in 1978, Crane seemed to disappear from the public eye. By 1984, Crane was in ailing health and his ex-wife Helen Demaree cared for him in her home in Pauma Valley.

== Death ==
On February 6, 1985, Crane died in a Pauma Valley hospital in California only a day shy of his 69th birthday. Anemia was announced of his cause of death. While he did contribute to the entertainment field, Crane's legacy lies in his restaurants. Crane's innovative and high-profile restaurants helped to solidify the Polynesian pop culture of the 1950s and 1960s and remain symbolic of that legacy.
