= Johnny Stompanato =

Ex-US Marine and gang enforcer (1925–1958)

John Stompanato
- Stompanato with Lana Turner
- Born: John Stompanato Jr. October 10, 1925; Woodstock, Illinois, U.S.
- Died: April 4, 1958 (aged 32); Beverly Hills, California, U.S.
- Burial place: Oakland Cemetery, Woodstock IL
- Spouses: Sara Utush (m. 1946; div. 1949) Helen Gilbert (m. 1949; div. 1949) Helene Stanley (m. 1953; div. 1955)
- Military career
- Allegiance: United States
- Branch: United States Marine Corps
- Service years: 1943–1946
- Rank: Private
- Nicknames: Johnny, Handsome Harry, John Steele
- Units: Service Battalion, 1st Marine Division
- Conflicts: World War II: Battle of Peleliu; Battle of Okinawa
- Other work: Mob Bodyguard

John Stompanato Jr. (October 10, 1925 – April 4, 1958) was a United States Marine and gangster who became a bodyguard and enforcer for the gangster Mickey Cohen.

In the mid-1950s, he began an abusive relationship with actress Lana Turner. In 1958, he was stabbed to death by Turner's daughter, Cheryl Crane. His death was ruled as justifiable homicide because he was stabbed in self-defense.

== Early life ==
John Stompanato (front left) during the Pacific War in WWII, with his comrades, Anthony “Duke” Falco (top left), Anthony “Sag” Sylvester (top right),(gathering behind the grave of Pfc. Joseph J. Petillo of Asbury Park, New Jersey. KIA Okinawa. Photo courtesy of the Falco Family of Asbury Park, NJ.

John Stompanato Jr., was born into an Italian American family in Woodstock, Illinois. His father, John Sr., owned a barber shop and his mother, Carmela, was a seamstress. Both parents were born in Italy but were married in Brooklyn. They had moved to Woodstock in 1916. Stompanato was the youngest of four children: he had two older sisters, Grace and Teresa; and an older brother, Carmine. Six days after his birth, his mother died of peritonitis. Johnny's father soon married a woman named Verena Freitag.

In 1940, after Stompanato's freshman year at Woodstock High School, his father sent him to Kemper Military School for boys in Boonville, Missouri. In 1942, he graduated at the age of 17. In 1943, Stompanato joined the U.S. Marines serving with the headquarters and service company, 1st Marine Division. He served in the South Pacific theater, in Peleliu and Okinawa, and then served in China. Stompanato left the Corps in March 1946, being discharged in China.

Stompanato met his first wife, Sara Utush, a Turkish woman, while stationed in Tianjin, China. They wed in May 1946. Utush was a dress designer who had formerly lived in Beijing. Stompanato converted to Islam in order to marry her. They returned to Woodstock where they had their first son, John Stompanato III, who was born in September 1947. Stompanato left his wife and child and moved to Hollywood, California, in 1947. His wife was granted a divorce in Illinois on the grounds of desertion in January 1949. The next month, Stompanato, described in a news article as a "ceramics manufacturer," married actress Helen Gilbert. Three months later, Gilbert announced she would seek to end the marriage, calling it a "mistake." They divorced in July 1949.

== Organized crime ==
After moving to Los Angeles, Stompanato owned and managed "The Myrtlewood Gift Shop" in Westwood. The business sold inexpensive pieces of pottery and wood carvings as fine art. Through connections to the LA underworld, he became a bodyguard for gangster Mickey Cohen and as well as an organized crime enforcer for his crime family. Stompanato also established himself within Hollywood high society. In 1948, Frank Sinatra asked Cohen to tell Stompanato to keep away from Ava Gardner, but Cohen instead told Sinatra to go back to his wife and children.

In August 1949, Stompanato was described in the press as the "new right hand man" and bodyguard of rackets boss Mickey Cohen, replacing Neddie Herbert, who had been slain in an ambush the previous month. At the time, Stompanato was arrested on a charge of vagrancy. At the time of his arrest, which was ordered as part of a campaign by Los Angeles County sheriff Eugene W. Biscailuz to "de-hoodlumize" the Sunset Strip, he was driving a Cadillac and was carrying checks totaling $33,657.50.

In 1950, Stompanato, described as a "recent and inexperienced recruit from Illinois," was listed as one of the principal members of the Cohen gang by the California Commission on Organized Crime. Throughout the 1950s, he was arrested seven times by the LAPD for various criminal charges ranging from vagrancy to suspicion of robbery.

In October 1952, Stompanato left Cohen and started dating Helene Stanley, a former 20th Century Fox contract player and a live model for The Walt Disney Company. By December, he was working as her manager. The following year, she became his third wife; however, they divorced two years later in 1954.

== Relationship with Lana Turner ==
By 1957, Stompanato was in a relationship with actress Lana Turner. Turner also at the time recently ended her contract with MGM and chose not to sign a new contract under the new studio head Dore Schary. In recognition of their relationship, Stompanato began wearing a heavy gold-link bracelet on his wrist with "Lanita" inscribed inside. Turner's daughter Cheryl Crane described him as:

B-picture good looks ... thick set ... powerfully built and soft spoken ... and talked in short sentences to cover a poor grasp of grammar and spoke in a deep baritone voice. With friends, he seldom smiled or laughed out loud, but seemed always coiled, holding himself in ... had watchful hooded eyes that took in more than he wanted anyone to notice ... His wardrobe on a daily basis consisted of roomy, draped slacks, a silver buckled skinny leather belt and lizard shoes.

Their relationship was stormy; it was punctuated with frequent arguments and fights. In 1957, Stompanato became so jealous about Turner's relationship with future James Bond actor Sean Connery, he flew to London and travelled to Borehamwood, Hertfordshire. He stormed onto the set of Another Time, Another Place threatening Connery with a gun. Unperturbed, the 6 ft 2 in (188 cm) actor, who was a former body builder bent Stompanato's hand back and punched him, forcing him to drop the weapon. Stompanato was reported to the police and quietly deported from the United Kingdom. After Stompanato's death, it was rumored that at least one LA mobster held Connery responsible, leading the actor to go into hiding for a short time afterwards.

=== Fatal stabbing ===
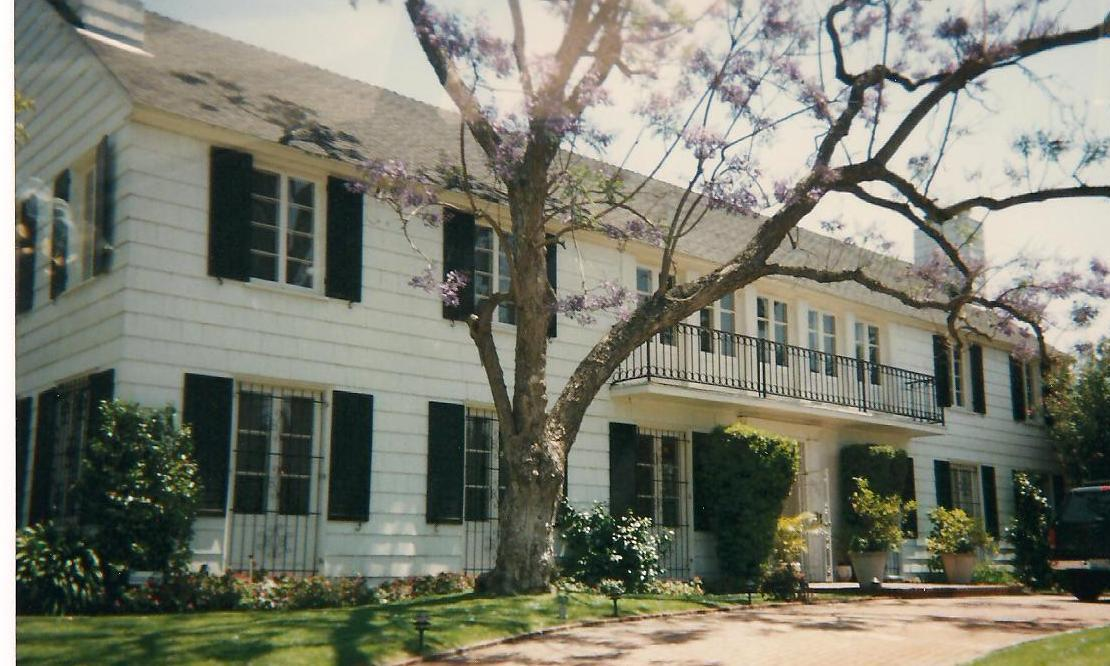
Lana Turner's former home in Beverly Hills where Stompanato was killed in 1958.

On April 4, 1958, Stompanato was stabbed to death by Turner's teenage daughter Cheryl Crane at her mother's home in Beverly Hills, California. She claimed that Stompanato had been violently attacking her mother. A coroner's inquest returned a decision of justifiable homicide. After the ruling, Stompanato's family sued Turner for $750,000 ($6.41 million in 2025); they settled in 1962 for $20,000 ($162,751).

Stompanato is interred at Oakland Cemetery, in Woodstock, McHenry County, Illinois beside his mother Carmela, his father John and his stepmother Verena. His brother Carmine is buried nearby.

== Portrayals ==
- In 1979, Rene Ricard wrote one of his best-known poems, The Death of Johnny Stompanato, published in Italian translation in 1981 and republished in Rene Ricard, Love Poems, CUZ Editions, 1999.
- In James Ellroy's novels, Stompanato is a minor character in The Big Nowhere, and in L.A. Confidential Stompanato plays a key role in the conspiracy at the center of the story. At the novel's conclusion, Ellroy weaves many of the real-life details of Stompanato's death into the otherwise largely fictional plot.
- In the 1997 movie L.A. Confidential (1997), Stompanato is portrayed by Paolo Seganti, and is seen sitting in a booth with Lana Turner, portrayed by Brenda Bakke, at West Hollywood's Formosa Cafe.
- A BBC Radio 4 original play, Jonathan Holloway - A Night with Johnny Stompanato, was first broadcast in 2008.
- Stompanato is played by James Carpinello in the 2013 film Gangster Squad.
- Stompanato makes an appearance in the 2011 video game L.A. Noire as an associate of gangster Mickey Cohen and is voiced by Andy Davoli.
- "Tijuana Bible" written, and sung by Tom Russell is a story song about Stompanato. The opening lines are: "Lana Turner's daughter killed Joey Stompanato..." found on Hightone Records release 'Modern Art'.
- In 2025, Stompanato is voiced by Taylor Zakhar Perez in the Audible audio drama The Big Fix: A Jack Bergin Mystery.

== Notes ==
=== References ===
- Lewis, Brad (2007). Hollywood's Celebrity Gangster: The Incredible Life and Times of Mickey Cohen. Enigma Books: New York. ISBN 978-1-929631-65-0.
- Crane, Cheryl & Cliff Jahr (1988). Detour: A Hollywood Story. Arbor House.
