= List of bounty hunters =

This is a list of bounty hunters.

== List ==
Name	Life	Years active	Notes	Ref.
Joshua Armstrong	1958–	1986–	Founder of the Seekers bounty hunting group.	
Steve Blackman	1963–		Featured on the reality TV series Blackman's Bounties.	
Bob Burton	1939–2016	1959–2016	Burton is considered one of the most successful bounty hunters in the U.S., having captured over 3,500 criminals. He also operates the country's only bounty hunting school, located in West Palm Beach. Robert (Bob) Burton died peacefully on September 22, 2016, in Santa Barbara.	
Duane "Dog" Chapman	1953–	1979–	He and his family, including Beth, Leland, Lyssa Chapman and Tim Chapman, were featured on the reality TV series Dog the Bounty Hunter and Dog and Beth: On the Hunt.	
Charietto		356–357	A Germanic headhunter and bounty hunter employed by the Romans on the Rhine frontier. He assisted Julian the Apostate, future Emperor of Rome, in capturing a group of barbarian raiders during the winter of 356–357 AD.	
Rick Crouch	1960–	1989–2005	Known as "PI to the Stars", Crouch assisted the FBI and various law enforcement agencies in locating and returning wanted fugitives. The Discovery Channel ranked Crouch as #6 of the top 10 bounty hunters in the world.	
Dunn Brothers		1896	Occasional bounty hunters who ran a boarding house near Ingalls, Oklahoma during the 1890s. It is widely believed that George Newcomb and Charley Pierce, members of the Wild Bunch, were murdered by the Dunn brothers at their ranch in order to collect the $5,000 reward on each outlaw.	
John Riley Duncan	1850–1911	1878–1895	A former Texas Ranger responsible for the 1878 capture of outlaw John Wesley Hardin, Duncan spent the rest of his career as a bounty hunter.	
Roy Faust	1954-	1998-	Became a full-time Bounty Hunter in 1998 after being trained by Bob Burton and became a Life Member of N.A.B.E.A (National Association of Bail Enforcement Agents). Faust was the first Bounty Hunter to be both insured and bonded as a Bounty Hunter. Was the first licensed Bounty Hunter in the State of Iowa and has a 98% recovery rate. Faust was once indicted by Massachusetts, along with Angus Rushlow (MA Bounty Hunter), for doing their job. They stood in court for two years before a jury found them not guilty of all charges (kidnapping etc.). Faust was also a good friend of Mel Barth, the late executive director of NABEA.	
Franklin "Bounty Tank" Frazier	1987	2012–present	Former police officer turned bounty hunter based in Akron, Ohio. Bounty Tank has a YouTube channel with raw footage of real life bounty hunting as Bounty Tank chases down fugitives who have skipped court on bond.	
Mickey Free	1851–1915		A Mexican-born Apache scout and bounty hunter on the American frontier. In his time as a bounty hunter, Free tracked the Apache Kid who then had a $15,000 reward on his head.	
Domino Harvey	1969–2005	1993–1997	A former British actress-model turned bounty hunter. The 2005 action film Domino was loosely based on her life.	
Jonathan Idema	1956–2012	2001–2004	A former Green Beret who led a small group of bounty hunters to Afghanistan with the intention of collecting the $1 million reward on Osama bin Ladin. In 2004, he was convicted by the Afghan government of running a private prison in Kabul and torturing Afghan citizens.	
Celes King III	1923–1976	1949–1976	One of the most famous bail bondsmen in Los Angeles, King employed many bounty hunters, including Domino Harvey, among others. He was also a noted civil rights activist being involved with CORE and the NAACP.	
John Mullowney	1690–1726	1709–1726	An Irish horse thief who agreed to hunt down Catholic priests in exchange for his life.	
Leonard Padilla	1937–2017	1975–2017	Based in San Francisco, Padilla hosted a reality TV show for the National Geographic Channel as well as appearing CNN to discuss the Caylee Anthony case. He has been the Chairman of the Board of Trustees of the Lorenzo Patiño Law School since 1983.	
David Schultz	1955–	1988–2003	A former pro wrestler, Schultz pursued criminals as far as Egypt and Puerto Rico. He has arrested around 1,700 fugitives and worked with the Federal Bureau of Investigation, the Drug Enforcement Administration and various police departments for over 15 years.	
Charlie Siringo	1855–1928	1870s–1907	Siringo worked as a deputy marshal and later as a detective agent for the Pinkerton Detective Agency.	
Carl Tanner	1962–	1986–1989	Prior to his music career, Tanner was employed by a local bail bondsman while working as big rig truck driver in Arlington, Virginia.	
Ralph "Papa" Thorson	1926–1991	1947–1991	A legendary bounty hunter who captured over 12,000 fugitives during his 40-year career. The 1980 action film The Hunter is based on his life. Thorson's wife and daughter, Dottie and Brandi Thorson, took over the bounty hunting business after his murder.	
Thomas Tate Tobin	1823–1904		Hired by the U.S. Army to track down and kill the notorious Felipe Espinosa and his brother; Tobin returned to Ft. Garland with their heads in a sack.	
Tyler "Beast" Kosman		2015–Present	Owner of Beast Fugitive Recovery in Kansas City, one of the most sought after teams in the Midwest catching hundreds of fugitives each year.	

== See also ==
- List of fictional assassins and bounty hunters
- Nazi hunter
