= Federal Detention Center, Honolulu =

Prison facility in the United States

Coordinates: 21.333597°N 157.928093°W

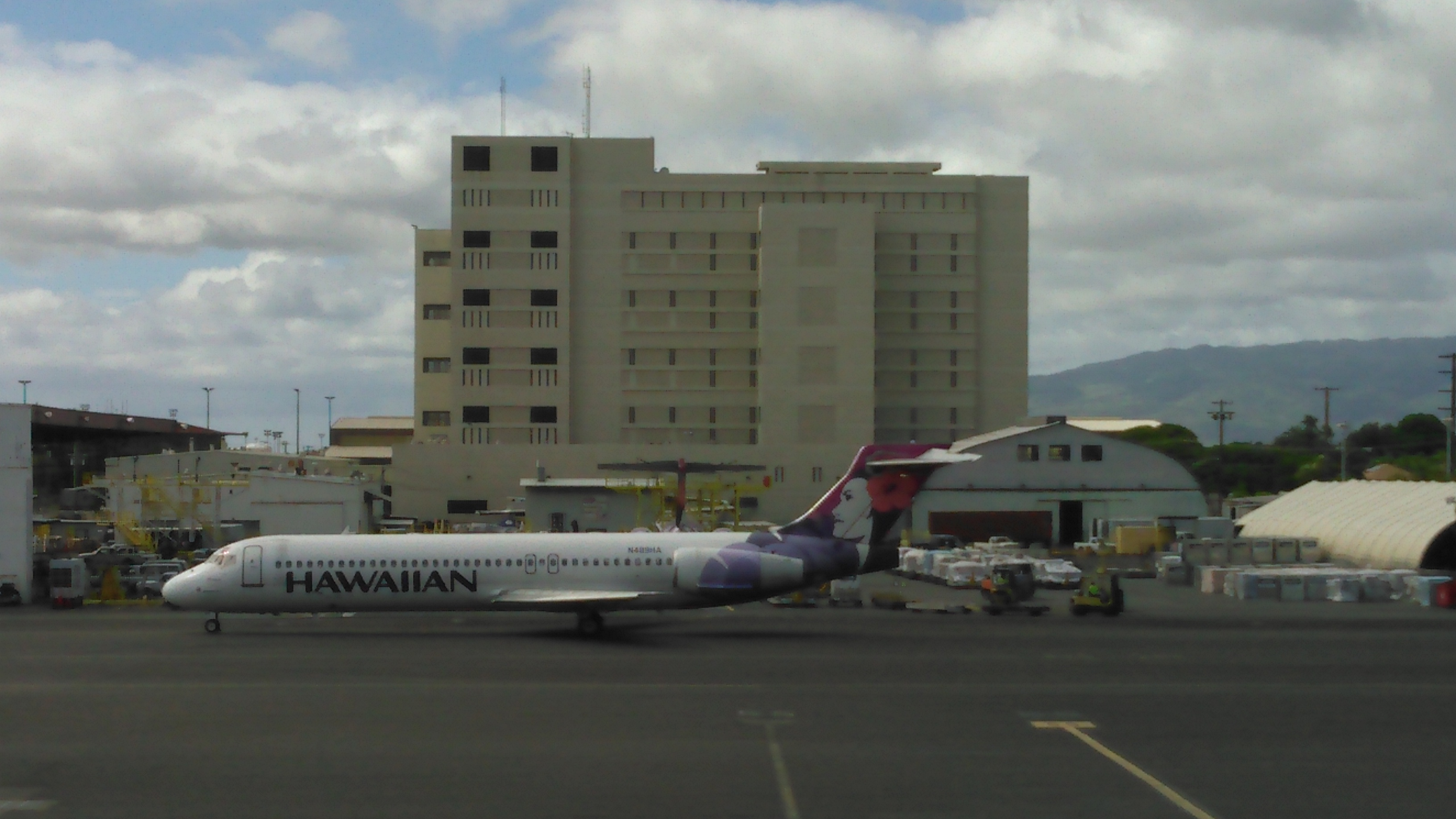
- FDC Honolulu as seen from the Inter-Island Terminal at Honolulu International Airport.
- Interactive map of Federal Detention Center, Honolulu
- Location: Honolulu, Hawaii
- Status: Operational
- Security class: Administrative Security
- Capacity: 695
- Opened: 2001
- Managed by: Federal Bureau of Prisons
- Warden: Estela Derr
- Website: Official website

The Federal Detention Center, Honolulu (FDC Honolulu) is a federal prison in Honolulu, Hawaii, United States. It holds male and female prisoners of all security levels prior to or during court proceedings in Hawaii Federal District Court, as well as inmates serving brief sentences. It is operated by the Federal Bureau of Prisons, a division of the United States Department of Justice.

FDC Honolulu is located adjacent to Daniel K. Inouye International Airport, and is at the airport's western perimeter. The building has twelve stories.

As of 2013, it houses 300 prisoners sentenced under Hawaii state law rather than federal law; the Hawaii state prison system did not have enough capacity for these prisoners.

== History ==
The facility opened in 2001. The first 25 inmates to occupy the facility were scheduled to arrive at FDC Honolulu on July 31 of that year; previously they were held in facilities in the Mainland United States. The first five groups, each consisting of 25 inmates, were made up of inmates within their final two years of their federal prison sentences. FDC Honolulu relieved the Oahu Community Correctional Center, operated by the Hawaii Department of Public Safety. As of June 2001, the Oahu Community Correctional Center, designed to hold 1,000 pretrial inmates, held 1,150 pretrial inmates. The first pretrial inmates from Hawaii were scheduled to move into the federal center one month after the first five groups of 25 convicted inmates had arrived.

As of 2016, the Hawaii State Legislature has expressed an interest in acquiring FDC Honolulu.

== Notable inmates (current and former) ==
Inmate Name	Register Number	Photo	Status	Details
Duane "Dog" Chapman	95743–022		Arrested on September 14, 2006; released on bail the next day.	Subjects of the A&E reality television program Dog the Bounty Hunter; arrested on an illegal bounty hunting warrant issued in Mexico in connection with their apprehension of serial rapist Andrew Luster in 2003; the charges against them were later dismissed.
Leland Chapman	95744–022		Arrested on September 14, 2006; released on bail the next day.	Subjects of the A&E reality television program Dog the Bounty Hunter; arrested on an illegal bounty hunting warrant issued in Mexico in connection with their apprehension of serial rapist Andrew Luster in 2003; the charges against them were later dismissed.
Tim Chapman	95742–022		Arrested on September 14, 2006; released on bail the next day.	Subjects of the A&E reality television program Dog the Bounty Hunter; arrested on an illegal bounty hunting warrant issued in Mexico in connection with their apprehension of serial rapist Andrew Luster in 2003; the charges against them were later dismissed.
Roger Christie	99279–022		Served 4 years; released in September 2014.	Pleaded guilty to marijuana trafficking and two counts of failing to file income tax returns.
Dalton Tanonaka	95456-022		Served a 90-day sentence; released on March 13, 2006.	Pleaded guilty for not being truthful about funds he received for his failed campaigns for Lieutenant Governor of Hawaii, and his campaign for United States House of Representatives.
Alexander Ma	12272-122		Transferred to FCI Beaumont. Serving a 10-year sentence; scheduled for release on February 19, 2029.	Former CIA agent who was convicted of sending classified documents to China.
Nicholas Ochs	12336–122		Transferred to FCI Butner. Sentenced to four years in prison; released on November 4, 2024, after his conviction was overturned by the Supreme Court. Pardoned by President Donald Trump in January 2025.	Leader of the Proud Boys Hawaii chapter. Arrested upon returning from Washington, D.C. at the Daniel K. Inouye International Airport for participating in the U.S. Capitol attack.

== See also ==
- List of U.S. federal prisons
- Federal Bureau of Prisons
- Incarceration in the United States
