= Max Factor (disambiguation) =

Max Factor is a line of cosmetics from Coty, Inc.

Max Factor may also refer to:

- Max Factor & Company (1909–1973), a former cosmetics company
- Max Factor Sr. (1877–1938), founder of Max Factor cosmetics
- Max Factor Jr. (1904–1996), U.S. businessman, son of Max Factor, president of the cosmetics company
- Max Factor Building, a building in Hollywood, California
- "The Max Factor", an investigative report about Robert Maxwell by Nisha Pillai

== See also ==
- Greatest common factor or maximum factor
