= A Date with Darkness: The Trial and Capture of Andrew Luster =

2003 American television film

- Written by: Christopher Canaan
- Directed by: Bobby Roth
- Starring: Jason Gedrick; Marla Sokoloff; Lisa Edelstein; Sarah Carter; Stefanie von Pfetten
- Theme music composer: Christopher Franke
- Country of origin: United States
- Original language: English

Production
- Producers: Larry A. Thompson; Ted Bauman
- Cinematography: Eric van Haren Noman
- Editor: Henk van Eeghen
- Running time: 120 minutes

Original release
- Network: Lifetime
- Release: August 11, 2003

A Date with Darkness: The Trial and Capture of Andrew Luster is a 2003 American made-for-television drama film based on a true story about criminal Andrew Luster. It originally premiered on Lifetime on August 11, 2003.

== Plot ==
On July 14, 2000, in Ventura County, California, young Connie is raped by the Max Factor heir Andrew Luster after ingesting a drug called Liquid X in a glass of water offered by him in a nightclub. With the support of her father, she reluctantly decides to go to the police and gives them snapshots of the occurrence. While Connie and the police collect evidence to send Andrew to the jury and during the investigation, two other victims of Andrew, Sarah and Teri, are found and join the accusation. He is placed on trial, but escapes during the proceedings. Under Federal regulations, the trial proceeds in absentia, and he is convicted.

The movie started shooting while Luster was still on the run, and was originally supposed to end with a plea for information regarding his whereabouts. However, while the film was in production, he was captured in Mexico by Duane "Dog" Chapman and returned to the country to serve an effective life sentence of 104 to 124 years. As a result, Luster's capture was written into the film at the last minute.

== Cast ==
- Jason Gedrick - Andrew Luster
- Marla Sokoloff - Connie
- Lisa Edelstein - Maeve Fox
- Sarah Carter - Sarah
- Stefanie von Pfetten - Teri
- Winston Rekert - Fred
- Tom Butler - Roger Diamond
- Shane Meier - Daniel
- Robert Wisden - Sam
- Samantha Ferris - Det. Katherine Cooke
- Kevin McNulty - Judge Riley
- Kavan Smith - Anthony Wold
- Jody Thompson - Alli morgan
- Rebecca Toolan - Mrs. Luster
- Kerry Sandomirsky - Dr. Dyer
- Karl Schreiner - Sean
- Summer Gibson-Lefaive - Megan
- José Vargas - Taco Stand Vendor
- Jennifer Renton - Woman in Bar
- Carson Roy - Boy Twin
- Kwesi Ameyaw - Newscaster
- Sophie Olsen - Nurse
- Paula Lee - Court Reporter
