= Beauty micrometer =

1930s device for facial measurement

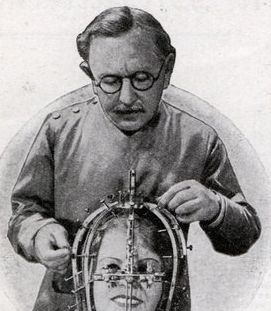
Max Factor demonstrating his beauty micrometer device in 1935.

The beauty micrometer, also known as the beauty calibrator, was a device designed in the early 1930s to help in the identification of the areas of a person's face which need to have their appearance reduced or enhanced by make-up. The inventors include famed beautician Max Factor Sr. A 2013 Wired article described the device as "a Clockwork Orange style device" that combines "phrenology, cosmetics and a withering pseudo-scientific analysis". A photograph of Factor, using the device on actress Marjorie Reynolds featured in a 1935 article in science magazine Modern Mechanix and, when republished by The Guardian in 2013, the caption described it as being "a contraption that looks like an instrument of torture".

Placed on and around the head and face, the beauty micrometer uses flexible metal strips which align with a person's facial features. The screws holding the strips in place allow for 325 adjustments, enabling the operator to make fine measurements with a precision of one thousandth of an inch. The inventors stated that there are two key measurements that they looked for: the heights of the nose and forehead should be the same, and the eyes should be separated by the width of one eye. When an imperfection is identified, corrective make-up can be applied to enhance or subdue the feature. The company Max Factor claims that the device helped Max Factor, Sr. to better understand the female face.

The beauty micrometer was completed in 1932 and was primarily intended for use in the movie industry. When an actor's face is shown on a very large scale their "flaws" are magnified and can become "glaring distortions", according to the Modern Mechanix article. This device was intended to remedy the perceived problem, and the inventors also envisioned it being used in beauty shops. However, it did not become popular and did not gain widespread usage. Only one beauty micrometer is believed to exist. It is featured in a display at the Hollywood Entertainment Museum and came up for auction in 2009, falling significantly short of the $10,000–$20,000 estimate.
