= Dog's Most Wanted =

American reality television series

- Promotional image for Dog's Most Wanted
- Genre: Reality
- Starring: Duane Chapman; Beth Chapman; Leland Chapman; David Robinson; Rainy Robinson; Cecily Chapman; Dakota Chapman; Sonny Westbrook; Kaleo Padilla
- Country of origin: United States
- Original language: English
- No. of seasons: 1
- No. of episodes: 10

Production
- Executive producers: Duane Chapman; Beth Chapman; Chris Dorsey; Matt Assmus
- Production companies: Dorsey Pictures; Entertainment by Bonnie and Clyde

Original release
- Network: WGN America
- Release: September 4 – November 6, 2019

Related
- Dog the Bounty Hunter (2004–2012); Dog and Beth: On the Hunt (2013–2015); Dog and Beth: Fight of Their Lives (2017)

Dog's Most Wanted is an American reality television series that ran on WGN America from September 4 to November 6, 2019. It succeeds previous reality series starring Duane Chapman, including A&E's Dog the Bounty Hunter, and CMT's Dog and Beth: On the Hunt.

== Premise ==
Rather than hunting down people who have jumped bail with his company, Dog, now mostly retired from bounty hunting, hunts wanted fugitives of his choosing who need his expertise to bring down, while also dealing with his wife's cancer diagnosis.

== Cast ==
- Duane "Dog" Chapman, also known as Dog the Bounty Hunter.
- Beth Chapman, Dog's wife.
- Leland Chapman, Dog's son.
- David Robinson, Dog's right-hand man.
- Rainy Robinson, Beth's right-hand woman.
- Cecily Chapman, Beth's daughter.
- Dakota Chapman, Leland's son.
- Sonny Westbrook, Dog's security.
- Kaleo Padilla, Dog's Security.

== Episodes ==
No.	Title	Original release date
1	"Like Father, Like Son"	September 4, 2019
Having gotten news of her cancer diagnosis, Beth is determined to continue working. Dog's team goes after the most wanted man in Hawaii who has sixty-eight charges against him, stated to be more than Al Capone, and his son Willie Boy. Following a near-deadly encounter with Willie Boy, Dog's team unexpectedly catches his father, but vow not to stop until they catch Willie Boy too. Note: The episode opens with Beth Chapman, who died on June 26, 2019, receiving her lung cancer diagnosis.
2	"Chasing Willie Boy"	September 11, 2019
Beth continues fighting her cancer while working with the team. The team continues hunting for Willie Boy whose behavior has taken a dangerous turn. Following a high-speed car chase, Kaleo's friend Rob, who is also friends with Willie Boy, claims that he will help Willie Boy turn himself in, but apparently instead distracts the team to buy Willie Boy time to get away. After Beth uses social media to put pressure on Willie Boy, he makes contact and finally surrenders peacefully. With Willie Boy having done the right thing, the team makes peace with their fugitive and stage an intervention to try to get him to change his life.
3	"Alabama Sweep"	September 18, 2019
Beth displays a more realistic view of her condition than Dog as she continues to hunt with the team despite feeling very ill. Dog and his team agree to help Leland's new boss hunt five fugitives in Alabama in one week, something that Dog dubs the Alabama Sweep. Of the five fugitives, one turns out to be in the hospital following a massive heart attack, another is in Mississippi and Dog and Leland intend to use their connections to get him, another surrenders himself to the authorities when he learns that Dog the Bounty Hunter is chasing him and the team uses social media to trick and catch the other two. Things get heated with the last fugitive when the team learns that he is physically abusive towards his girlfriend. Along with arresting the fugitive, Dog promises the now ex-girlfriend his help should the man ever contact her again.
4	"A Huntsville Hunt"	September 25, 2019
Pain in Beth's throat sparks fear that her original throat cancer has returned. Beth gets an MRI, but Dog suspects she skips the appointment with the results due to the possibility of bad news. Still in Alabama following the successful Alabama Sweep, Dog and his team agree to help Leland hunt down another fugitive. Due to Beth feeling unwell on the second night of the hunt, most of Dog's team remains behind to work the phones and are replaced by some of Leland's team, including Leland's wife and his son Cobie who is on his very first bounty hunt. On the third day, the fugitive agrees to surrender, but never shows up. Dog and Beth are forced to leave the team to finish the job due to Beth's appointment regarding her cancer in LA. The next day, the team launches a daytime raid on the fugitive's property and finally catch him, resulting in the team getting put in the newspaper.
5	"Parent "hood""	October 2, 2019
Beth has received the devastating news that her cancer is incurable with no chance of survival. Having stopped her chemo treatments due to the side effects, Dog and Beth begin discussing other options. Now back home, Dog and the team are contacted by Leland to chase one of his fugitives, Manuel, who has fled to Hawaii. Manuel's brother was previously taken down by Leland's son Dakota on his first bounty and Dog caught his father. Within hours, the team is able to capture Manuel with the help of his girlfriend's grandfather and Dog predicts that Manuel will likely be going to prison for many years. Dog is later contacted by Leland to capture Cristin, a girl who has skipped bail and on whom three cases rests. With Dakota having a baby on the way in a matter of weeks, he carries a baby doll around on the hunt to practice. Cristin is caught by Dakota while trying to escape out a window and is found with a significant amount of meth in her bedroom. During the two hunts, Leland's prized Hummer gets banged up. After the hunt, Dakota learns that his wife has gone into labor six weeks early and she gives birth to his son.
6	"Saving Jamie"	October 9, 2019
While Beth and the rest of the team search for a new office and enjoy a hike at Manoa Falls Trail, Dog and David go to Las Vegas, Nevada to hunt for Jamie Jungers, one of Tiger Woods' alleged mistresses, as a favor for a friend. After four days of searching, a criminal informant leads Dog to his house where he claims Jamie is, but his shifty behavior draws the suspicions of Dog, David and local bail agent Vic. After taking Jamie into custody to be sent back to Kansas to stand trial, Dog, David and Vic notice one of the men from the house following them. Concerned, Dog alerts the Las Vegas police who arrest the man who Dog suspects was intending to kill Jamie. Jamie expresses remorse for her drug habit and a desire to turn her life around for the better. After returning to Hawaii, Dog holds a garage sale for the contents of his office with people from all over the world coming. Three months later, Dog video chats with Jamie who has entered rehab and is working on bettering her life.
7	"Mardi Gras Manhunt"	October 16, 2019
Dog's team travels to Louisiana over Mardi Gras to hunt Jinel Sexton, an accused child rapist and are joined by Leland and helped by Congressman Clay Higgins, a former law man and old friend of Dog's. After Leland speaks with Cathy, the mother of Jinel's child, Dog is contacted by an attorney on behalf of Cathy about Jinel turning himself in. Jinel surrenders, earning him praise from Dog, Beth and Clay for making the right choice. On Mother's Day, Dog and Beth visit Beth's brother Randy in Florida. Suffering from laryngitis, Beth gives a moving sermon at Randy's church.
8	"Beth's Final Hunt Pt. 1"	October 23, 2019
Dog and Beth join the nationwide manhunt for Sol Pais, a young woman obsessed with the Columbine High School massacre who is threatening to commit a school shooting of her own. As they try to help track down Sol, they receive word that she has committed suicide, bringing the manhunt to an end. For Beth's final hunt, they take the case of Leo Trujillo, Jr. who is wanted for first and second-degree assault at the request of old friend Bobby Brown. Dog and Beth's youngest son Garry joins the hunt for the first time as he dreams of becoming a member of law enforcement. Though the team fails to catch Leo for now, while following up on a lead on Leo's location, they arrest a bomb maker, satisfying Dog with taking another dangerous criminal off the streets, even if he wasn't the one they were looking for. At the same time, Garry prepares for his first high school prom and after catching the bomb maker, the team takes the night off to enjoy this milestone in Garry's life. Beth discusses living on to be able to enjoy such important milestones, acknowledging that "when it ends, it ends."
9	"Beth's Final Hunt Pt. 2"	October 30, 2019
The team, joined by Dog's son Garry once again, continues their pursuit of Leo Trujillo, Jr., now on Colorado's Most Wanted list, who continues to evade capture. Dog and his team, with the help of various informants, chase Leo for seven full days, coming close a few times but always being evaded. On the eighth day of the hunt, an informant points the team to a woman named Antionette's house where Leo is finally captured hiding in the garage. Leo is caught with a significant amount of meth which Dog suspects he was intending to sell. After being treated for a head injury, Leo is finally taken into custody with Dog stating that the eight day hunt for Leo Trujillo, Jr. was one of his most difficult ever. Afterwards, the team enjoys a meal together and Dog decides to begin calling them God's Gangsters based on a comment Leo made when he was captured. Dog discusses Beth's condition and her invaluable help in catching fugitives despite her deteriorating condition and refuses to talk about the possibility of Beth never being there, feeling it to be better not to voice such bleak thoughts.
10	"Farewell to a Queen"	November 6, 2019
After Beth collapses she has to be put on life support and in a medically induced coma due to the pain she is in. With no chance of recovery, Dog's family is forced to make the heartbreaking decision to remove the life support and allow Beth to pass. After surviving without life support for several hours longer than expected, Beth passes away at 5:36am on June 26, 2019. Having left the hospital, Dog is not able to return in time to be at Beth's side after she passes faster than expected. A devastated Dog expresses suicidal thoughts in his desire to be with his wife in Heaven. Because of how alive Beth felt bounty hunting, Dog decides to take another hunt before the Colorado memorial, Eddie Morales, a man who was charged with beating his wife. Despite Eddie running, he is quickly captured, though Leland rips his Achilles tendon in the process. Eddie's brother turns out to be a former fugitive captured by Dog who turned his life around afterwards, causing both Dog and Eddie's family to express hope he will turn his life around as well. Memorials are held for Beth in Hawaii and Colorado attended by hundreds of people and Beth's family spread her ashes at sea. Beth's friend Rainy calls Beth the true Dog's Most Wanted but Dog calls her his greatest capture instead. Various clips of Beth over time are shown ending with Beth stating that "I don't wanna be that person that's laying in that bed, I don't wanna be that person. If I'm gonna die, I'm gonna die in my boots." Notes: The episode displays information on the suicide hotline for people who are considering or know people who are considering suicide. The episode is dedicated in loving memory of Beth Chapman (1967–2019).

== Production ==
On January 14, 2019, it was announced that WGN America was developing its first unscripted television series in over five years entitled Dog's Most Wanted. The series is produced by Dorsey Pictures, a Red Arrow Studios company, and Entertainment by Bonnie and Clyde. Chris Dorsey and Matt Assmus serve as Executive Producers for Dorsey Pictures while the Chapman's serve as Executive Producers for Entertainment by Bonnie and Clyde. Entertainment by Bonnie and Clyde previously produced other Chapman series Dog and Beth: On the Hunt and Dog and Beth: Fight of Their Lives. The series received an immediate series order for ten episodes and production began in early 2019. In the series Dog and his wife Beth along with their team of hunters are set to travel the country and pursue the most-wanted fugitives from law enforcement agencies including the FBI and the United States Marshals Service. The series was initially expected to premiere in October 2019 however, later reports suggested early 2020. On June 22, 2019, Beth Chapman was hospitalized and placed in a medically induced coma. On June 26, 2019, Beth died at Hawaii's Queen's Medical Center in Honolulu, Hawaii as a result of stage two throat cancer. Following Beth's death the series resumed filming July 10, 2019. Series star Leland Chapman was injured during filming when he attempted to kick in a gate and tore his ACL while chasing fugitive Edward Morales in Adams County, Colorado. On July 22, 2019, WGN America announced that the series would premiere on September 4, 2019.

== Marketing ==
The first teaser for the series along with series art was released by WGN America on June 3, 2019. A second teaser was released on June 20, 2019. A memorial video commemorative of Beth's death was released on June 26, 2019. A first-look trailer was released on July 22, 2019, along with the announcement of the premiere date. To promote the series, WGN America aired a Dog the Bounty Hunter marathon beginning on September 3, 2019, leading up to the premiere on September 4.
