= Fugitive =

Person fleeing from custody

A video from the Chicago Police Department that was published to find information about men captured on camera who are wanted for murder.

A fugitive or runaway is a person who is fleeing from custody, whether it be from jail, a government arrest, government or non-government questioning, vigilante violence, or outraged private individuals. A fugitive from justice, also known as a wanted person, can be a person who is either convicted or accused of a crime and hiding from law enforcement in the state or taking refuge in a different country in order to avoid arrest.

A fugitive from justice alternatively has been defined as a person formally charged with a crime or a convicted criminal whose punishment has not yet been determined or fully served who is currently beyond the custody or control of the national or sub-national government or international criminal tribunal with an interest in their arrest. This latter definition adopts the perspective of the pursuing government or tribunal, recognizing that the charged (versus escaped) individual does not necessarily realize that they are officially a wanted person (e.g., due to a case of mistaken identity or reliance on a sealed indictment), and therefore may not be fleeing, hiding, or taking refuge to avoid arrest. The fugitive from justice is ‘international’ (versus ‘domestic’) if wanted by law enforcement authorities across a national border. Interpol is the international organization with no legal authority to directly pursue or detain fugitives of any kind. Europol is the European authority for the pursuit of fugitives who are on the run within Europe, and coordinates their search, while national authorities in the probable country of their stay coordinate their arrest. In the United States, the U.S. Marshals Service is the primary law enforcement agency that tracks down federal fugitives, though the Federal Bureau of Investigation also tracks fugitives.

In many jurisdictions, a fugitive who flees custody while a trial is underway loses the right to appeal any convictions or sentences imposed on him, since the act of fleeing is deemed to flout the court's authority. In 2003, convicted rapist Andrew Luster had his appeals denied on the basis that he spent six months as a fugitive (he was convicted in absentia).

== Terminology ==
While a person is being sought for potential arrest, the person may be described variously as being "at large" or as a "person of interest" to law enforcement. The latter term is frequently used in an "all-points bulletin" issued to other law enforcement persons or agencies. A person who has jumped bail after arraignment in court may be hunted or pursued by his bail bondsman, and a bounty may be "on his head." The act of fleeing from the jurisdiction of a court is described colloquially as "fleeing justice" or "running from the Law." A "wanted poster" may be issued, especially by the FBI, culminating in the "FBI's Most Wanted List" of fugitives.

"On the lam" or "on the run" often refers to fugitives. Mencken's The American Language and The Thesaurus of American Slang proclaim that lam, lamister, and "on the lam"—all referring to a hasty departure—were common in thieves' slang before the turn of the 20th century. Mencken quotes a newspaper report on the origin of 'lam' which actually traces it indirectly back to Shakespeare's time.

Its origin should be obvious to anyone who runs over several colloquial phrases for leavetaking, such as 'beat it' and 'hit the trail'. The allusion in 'lam' is to 'beat,' and 'beat it' is Old English, meaning 'to leave.' During the period of George Ade's 'Fables in Slang' (1900), cabaret society delight in talking slang, and 'lam' was current. Like many other terms, it went under in the flood of new usages of those days, but was preserved in criminal slang. A quarter of a century later it reappeared.

Mencken also quotes a story from the New York Herald Tribune newspaper in 1938 which reported that "one of the oldest police officers in New York said that he had heard 'on the lam' thirty years ago."

== Detection methods ==
Various methods can be used to find fugitives. Phone taps and pen registers can be used on relatives. Credit card and cell phone activities and electronic transfer of money can also be traced. Wanted posters and rewards can also be used. Jail records are also sometimes used; for instance, after the U.S. Government determined that Timothy McVeigh had perpetrated the Oklahoma City Bombing, he was found in a local jail.

Other methods include using anonymous tips from members of the public who may have seen sight of the fugitive; CCTV and other modes of technology; news broadcasting of public awareness (depending on the severity of the crime the fugitive has committed), and co-operation with local law enforcement teams.

== See also ==
- America's Most Wanted
- Bounty hunter
- Diplomatic Security Service (DSS)
- Convict
- Crime scene getaway
- Extradition
- FBI Ten Most Wanted Fugitives
- Fugitive peasants
- Fugitive slaves
- List of fugitives from justice who disappeared
- The Hunt with John Walsh
- I Am a Fugitive from a Chain Gang
- Immigration and Customs Enforcement (ICE)
- Interpol
- Manhunt (law enforcement)
- Outlaw
- Prison escape
- Resisting arrest
- United States Marshals Service
- FBI: Most Wanted, a spinoff of CBS drama FBI follows a division of the FBI that tracks down fugitives on the most wanted list.
