= Hillside Memorial Park Cemetery =

Jewish cemetery in Culver City, California, United States

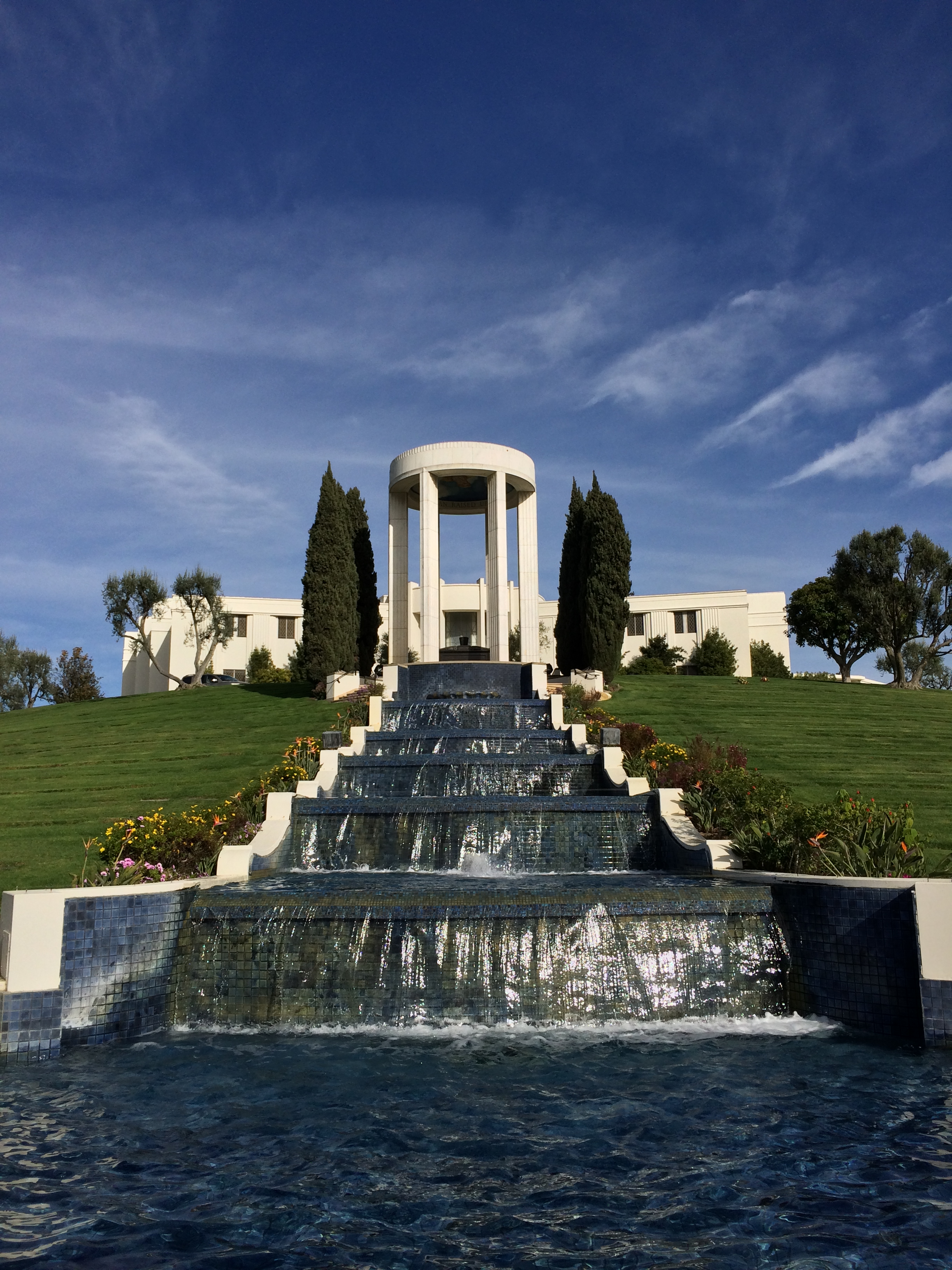
- Waterfall and Al Jolson monument at Hillside Memorial Park
- Interactive map of Hillside Memorial Park Cemetery

Details
- Established: 1941
- Location: 6001 West Centinela Avenue, Culver City, California, U.S.
- Country: United States
- Coordinates: 33°58′50″N 118°23′23″W
- Type: Jewish
- Owned by: Temple Israel of Hollywood
- Website: hillsidememorial.org
- Find a Grave: Hillside Memorial Park Cemetery
- The Political Graveyard: Hillside Memorial Park Cemetery

Hillside Memorial Park Cemetery is a Jewish cemetery in Culver City, California, United States. Many Jews from the entertainment industry are buried there. The cemetery is known for Al Jolson's elaborate tomb (designed by Los Angeles architect Paul Williams), a 75-foot-high pergola and monument atop a hill above a water cascade, all visible from the adjacent San Diego Freeway.

== History ==
Built on 35 acres of rolling hills in an undeveloped area near Inglewood, the cemetery was originally founded as B'nai B'rith Memorial Park in 1941 by Lazare F. Bernhard and Robert S. and Harry Groman, founders of Groman Mortuaries in 1936 and sons of Charles Groman, who co-founded the first licensed Jewish mortuary west of Chicago, Glasband-Groman-Glasband, before it was renamed "Hillside Memorial Park" in 1942. Because of objections by the Inglewood Chamber of Commerce, they were not granted a permit to operate by the Los Angeles County Board of Supervisors until July 1943.

In 1951 the park became famous when Al Jolson's widow, Erle, purchased a large plot and had erected a 75-foot-high domed monument in his memory. Thousands attended the dedication and service, which included a eulogy by Jack Benny.

After a bitter legal dispute between the Groman brothers, and Robert's death in 1957, the park was acquired by Temple Israel of Hollywood, which continues to own and operate it.

Jack Benny's funeral in 1974 included a eulogy by Bob Hope and was attended by over 2000 people, including dozens of well-known members of the entertainment community. Major figures in the worlds of philanthropy, women's rights, law, education, medicine and religion are interred at Hillside, some of whom are listed below.

== Notable interments ==
=== A ===
- Irving Aaronson (1895–1963), composer
- Aron Abrams (1960–2010), television producer and writer
- Russ Alben (1929–2012), advertising executive and composer
- Van Alexander (1915–2015), musician
- Corey Allen (1934–2010), actor, director, producer and screenwriter
- Sheldon Allman (1924–2002), actor, singer and songwriter
- DJ AM (1973–2009), disc jockey
- Paul Alter, (1922-2011), television director
- Maria Altmann (1916–2011), refugee who achieved the return of the Portrait of Adele Bloch-Bauer I to her family.
- Army Archerd (1922–2009), journalist and television host

=== B ===
- Burt Bacharach (1928-2023), singer, songwriter, pianist
- Frank Bank (1942–2013), actor
- Sandy Baron (1936–2001), actor and comedian
- Gene Barry (1919–2009), actor and singer
- Leonard Beerman (1921–2014), Reform rabbi
- Jack Benny (1894–1974), actor and comedian
- Henry Bergman (1868–1946), actor
- Milton Berle (1908–2002), actor and comedian
- Pandro S. Berman (1905–1996), producer and former head of RKO Radio Pictures
- Shelley Berman (1925–2017), actor and comedian
- Ted Berman (1919–2001), animator and director
- Helen Beverley (1916–2011), actress
- Theodore Bikel (1924–2015), actor and singer
- Bruce Bilson (1928-2026), director, producer, screenwriter
- Mike Bloomfield (1943–1981), musician
- Ben Blue (1901–1975), actor and comedian
- Neil Bogart (1943–1982), founder of Casablanca Records
- Sorrell Booke (1930–1994), actor
- Barbara Bosson (1939–2023), actress
- Saul Brandman (1925–2008), garment manufacturer
- Irving Brecher (1914–2008), screenwriter, producer, director
- Andrew Breitbart (1969–2012), political commentator
- Bernie Brillstein (1931–2008), producer and talent agent
- Richard Brooks (1912–1992), director
- Marion Byron (1911–1985), actress

=== C ===
- Susan Cabot (1927–1986), actress
- Eddie Cantor (1892–1964), actor, comedian, singer and philanthropist
- Nell Carter (1948–2003), actress and singer
- Gilbert Cates (1934–2011), director and producer
- Jeff Chandler (1918–1961), actor
- Cyd Charisse (1922–2008), actress and dancer
- Robert Clary (1926–2022), actor, singer
- Ronni Chasen (1946–2010), publicist
- June Clayworth (1912–1993), actress
- Carl Cohen (1913–1986), businessman
- Mickey Cohen (1913–1976), mobster
- Norm Crosby (1927–2020), comedian

=== D ===
- Ike Danning (1905–1983), Major League Baseball player
- Valentine Davies (1905–1961), screenwriter
- Danny Dayton (1923–1999), actor
- Selma Diamond (1920–1985), actress and comedian

=== E ===
- Hilda Eisen (1917–2017), businessperson and philanthropist
- Julius J. Epstein (1909–2000), screenwriter
- Philip G. Epstein (1909–1952), screenwriter

=== F ===
- Max Factor Sr. (1877–1938), cosmetics magnate
- Max Factor Jr. (1904–1996), cosmetics businessman
- Percy Faith (1908–1976), musician
- Isadore Familian (1911–2002), faucet manufacturer
- Edith Flagg (1919–2014), fashion designer and businesswoman.
- Rhonda Fleming (1923–2020), actress
- Moe Franklin (1914–1978), Major League Baseball player
- Arthur Freed (1894–1973), producer and songwriter
- Friz Freleng (1906–1995), animator
- Ben Frommer (1913–1992), actor, known for F Troop

=== G ===
- Mary Leona Gage (1939–2010), beauty queen
- Larry Gelbart (1928–2009), television writer
- Sid Gillman (1911–2003), Hall of Fame football coach
- Bernard Gilmore (1937–2013), composer
- William Goetz (1903–1969), producer and former head of Universal Studios
- Jerry Goldsmith (1929–2004), composer
- Mark Goodson (1915–1992), producer
- Eydie Gormé (1928–2013), singer
- Gogi Grant (1924–2016), singer
- Carl Greenberg (1908–1984), newspaper reporter and editor
- Hank Greenberg (1911–1986), Major League Baseball Hall of Famer
- Lorne Greene (1915–1987), actor
- Brad Grey (1957–2017), film producer

=== H ===
- Marilyn Hall (1927–2017), producer
- Monty Hall (1921–2017), television host
- Elliot Handler (1916–2011), businessman
- Ruth Handler (1916–2002), inventor of the Barbie doll
- Lou Holtz (1893–1980), actor and comedian
- Moe Howard (1897–1975), actor, comedian, and member of the Three Stooges

=== I ===
- Sally Insul (1916–2008), actress

=== J ===
- Arthur P. Jacobs (1922–1973), film producer
- Jimmy Jacobs (1930–1988), handball player and boxing manager
- David Janssen (1931–1980), actor
- Quincy Jones (1933–2024), record producer, composer, and conductor
- George Jessel (1898–1981), actor and comedian
- Al Jolson (1886–1950), actor and singer

=== K ===
- Mickey Katz (1909–1985), comedy bandleader
- Sam Katzman (1901–1973), producer and director
- Sidney Kibrick (1928-2026), actor
- Larry King (1933–2021), television host and radio host
- Sammi Kane Kraft (1992–2012), actress and musician
- Philip N. Krasne (1905–1999), producer
- Paul Kohner (1902–1988), producer
- Sidney Korshak (1907–1996), labor lawyer and Chicago "fixer"

=== L ===
- Ely Landau (1920–1993), producer
- Jon Landau (1960-2024), film producer
- Mark Landon (1948–2009), musician, actor
- Michael Landon (1936–1991), actor
- Abe Lastfogel (1898–1984), Chairman of the William Morris talent agency
- Steve Lawrence (1935-2024), actor, singer and comedian
- Dan Leegant (1928–2009), actor, known for I'm Dangerous Tonight
- Jerry Leiber (1933–2011), songwriter
- Sheldon Leonard (1907–1997), actor and producer
- A. Fredric Leopold (1919–2008), lawyer and mayor of Beverly Hills
- Sammy Lerner (1903–1989), songwriter
- Sol Lesser (1890–1980), film producer
- Jules Levy (1923–2003), producer
- Peggy Lipton (1946–2019), actress
- Mary Livingstone (1905–1983), actress and comedian

=== M ===
- Abby Mann (1927–2008), screenwriter
- Daniel Mann (1912–1991), director
- Ted Mann (1916–2001), businessman and film executive
- Hal March (1920–1970), actor and comedian
- Trudy Marshall (1920–2004), actress
- Tony Martin (1913–2012), actor and singer
- Walter Mirisch (1921–2023), film producer
- Marvin Mitchelson (1928–2004), attorney
- Jane Morgan (1924-2025), actress, singer
- Howard Morris (1919–2005), actor and comedian
- Vic Morrow (1929–1982), actor
- Jan Murray (1916–2006), actor and comedian

=== N ===
- Monica von Neumann (1964–2019), socialite
- Leonard Nimoy (1931–2015), actor
- Shelly Novack (1944–1978), actor and football player
- Louis Nye (1913–2005), actor and comedian

=== O ===
- David Opatoshu (1918–1996), actor

=== P ===
- Norman Panama (1914–2003), director
- Joe Pasternak (1901–1991), producer
- Don Payne (1964–2013), screenwriter
- Poldek Pfefferberg (1913–2001), Holocaust survivor
- Julia Phillips (1944–2002), author and producer
- Paul Pink (1908–1996), founder of Pink's Hot Dogs
- Suzanne Pleshette (1937–2008), actress
- Tom Poston (1921–2007), actor
- Burt Prelutsky (1940–2021), screenwriter, newspaper columnist, and author

=== R ===
- Deborah Raffin (1953–2012), actress and audiobook publisher
- Irving Reis (1906–1953), radio producer, radio and film director
- Paul Richards (1924–1974), actor
- Harry Richman (1895–1972), singer and actor
- Leo Robin (1900–1984), composer
- Sid Rogell (1900–1973), producer
- Ben Rosenthal, presiding judge of the Los Angeles Municipal Court
- Stanley Ralph Ross (1935–2000), writer and actor
- Benny Rubin (1899–1986), actor
- Jerry Rubin (1938–1994), Yippie turned businessman, member of the Chicago Seven
- Barney Ruditsky (1898–1962), New York City detective turned Hollywood private investigator.

=== S ===
- Mort Sahl (1927–2021), comedian and actor
- Billy Sands (1911–1984), actor
- Connie Sawyer (1912–2018), actress
- Sherwood Schwartz (1916–2011), television producer; creator of Gilligan's Island and The Brady Bunch
- Irene Mayer Selznick (1907–1990), theatrical producer
- Freddie Sessler (1923–2000), entrepreneur
- Dan Seymour (1915–1993), actor
- Yvonne Shami (1935–2026), Mother
- Dick Shawn (1923–1987), actor and comedian
- Allan Sherman (1924–1973), Jewish American actor, comedian, and singer
- Richard M. Sherman (1928–2024), songwriter
- Robert B. Sherman (1925–2012), songwriter
- Dinah Shore (1916–1994), singer, actress and television host (partial cremated remains)
- Sammy Shore (1927–2019), comedian
- Julius Shulman (1910–2009), architectural photographer
- George Sidney (1916–2002), film director and producer
- Sol C. Siegel (1903–1982), film producer
- Al Silvera (1935–2002), Major League Baseball player
- Aaron Spelling (1923–2006), producer
- Harry Sukman (1912–1984), film and television composer
- Bud Swartz (1929–1991), Major League Baseball player
- Lela Swift (1919–2015), director and producer

=== T ===
- Konrad Tom (1887–1957), actor, director, singer, and writer
- Peter Tomarken (1942–2006), television host
- Lupita Tovar (1910–2016), actress

=== V ===
- Trish Vradenburg (1946–2017), television writer

=== W ===
- Irving Wallace (1916–1990), author
- Jack M. Warner (1916–1995), film producer
- Simon Waronker (1915–2005), record producer, co-founder of Liberty Records
- Lew Wasserman (1913–2002), agent, studio executive
- Paul Francis Webster (1907–1984), songwriter
- Jerry Weintraub (1937–2015), talent agent, concert promoter, film producer
- Stan Winston (1946–2008), makeup artist
- Shelley Winters (1920–2006), actress
- Dennis Wolfberg (1946–1994), actor and comedian
- Sol M. Wurtzel (1890–1958), film producer

=== Z ===
- Sigi Ziering (1928–2000), philanthropist and Holocaust survivor
- Sam Zimbalist (1904–1958), film editor
- Sandra Zober (1927–2011), actress
- Darrell Zwerling (1928–2014), actor

== See also ==
- Cemeteries in Los Angeles County, California
