= Abe Lastfogel =

- Born: May 17, 1898
- Died: August 27, 1984 (aged 86)
- Occupation: Talent agent
- Spouse: Frances Armus

Abraham Isaac Lastfogel (May 17, 1898 – August 27, 1984) was one of the first employees and a long-time president of the William Morris Agency, a large diversified talent agency.

== Early life ==
Lastfogel was the seventh son of a Jewish animal skinner who had fled Russia in 1889 to escape the pogroms. He was raised in a cold-water flat in New York.

== Career ==
The William Morris Agency hired Lastfogel in 1912 as an office boy. Finding success in the rapidly growing firm, Lastfogel moved to Hollywood in 1932 to manage WMA's Los Angeles office. He became chairman of the agency while William Morris Jr. served as president.

=== USO shows ===
During World War II, Lastfogel oversaw USO camp shows, which were wartime entertainment events featuring more than 7,000 performers seen by an estimated 200 million servicemen.

== Personal life ==
In 1927, Lastfogel married Frances Arms, a former Vaudeville performer. They had no children.

Lastfogel died of a heart attack in 1984 at Cedars-Sinai Medical Center in Los Angeles and was interred at the Hillside Memorial Park Cemetery.
