= Leland Chapman =

American bail bondsman and bounty hunter (born 1976)

- Born: Leland Blane Chapman; December 14, 1976 (age 49); Groom, Texas
- Occupations: Business owner, bounty hunter, Bail bondsman, Television personality
- Years active: 2004–present
- Television: Dog the Bounty Hunter
- Children: 3
- Father: Duane Chapman
- Relatives: Lyssa Chapman (sister)

Leland Blane Chapman (born December 14, 1976) is an American bail bondsman and bounty hunter, known as one of the stars of the A&E Network reality television program Dog the Bounty Hunter. He also starred in the CMT television documentary Dog and Beth: On the Hunt.

== Early life ==
Chapman spent his early years in Pampa, Texas, but during his teen years, moved to Colorado Springs, Colorado. As a teenager, Chapman ran away from home, began skipping school, and joined a gang. Unable to handle him any longer, his mother put him in foster care, although he ran away and he was placed in a boys home at 13. He was given the choice to go back into foster care or go live with his father and he chose to reside with his father.

At seventeen, Chapman began training in boxing and mixed martial arts with the help of his good friend Sonny Westbrook (who has appeared many times on Dog the Bounty Hunter).

== Career ==
On September 14, 2006, Leland Chapman was arrested along with Duane "Dog" Chapman and Tim Chapman by U.S. Marshals at the request of the Mexican government and was to be extradited to Mexico to face charges of "deprivation of liberty". The charges stem from an incident in which they were chasing fugitive and serial rapist Andrew Luster, the Max Factor Cosmetics heir. They captured Luster on June 18, 2003, in Puerto Vallarta, Mexico. Shortly after the capture, the three were themselves arrested by Puerto Vallarta police officers; the three posted bail but never returned to Mexico for their court hearing on July 15, 2003. They were released from custody on bail; Leland and Tim Chapman's bail was set at $100,000 each, while Dog's was set at $300,000. They faced an extradition hearing to Mexico, under the terms of treaties between the United States and Mexico.

Chapman, along with his brothers, Duane Lee and Wesley Chapman, formed Chapbros Media. The company launched an iPhone, iPod Touch and website talent contest application called, "Show Off".

The March 21, 2012, episode depicted Duane Lee telling Beth, "You want me fired, you gotta fire me," after which Chapman stated that he was quitting too. In 2012, the two brothers publicly stated that they left the show. In a tweet from Beth she wrote, "It will take 6 weeks to get thru the whole thing tonight's jus [sic] the beginning".

As of 2024, Chapman operates his own bail bond company, Kama'aina Bail Bonds in Hawaii. He previously headed Bounty Hunter Tactical Supply Co. after Duane Lee moved to Florida.
