= Tim Chapman =

American bounty hunter

- Born: May 13, 1965 (age 61); Ventura, California
- Other name: Youngblood
- Occupations: Television personality; bounty hunter
- Television: Dog the Bounty Hunter
- Children: 5

Timothy C. Chapman (born May 13, 1965) is an American retired bounty hunter, known for being one of the stars of A&E's Dog the Bounty Hunter, in which he assists Duane "Dog" Chapman track down and capture wanted fugitives.

== Personal life and career ==
Chapman, a third generation bondsman, was born in Ventura, California, the son of Ronald Chapman and a Colorado bondswoman, Diane Wimberly. His parents separated when he was 2 1/2 years old and he and his brother, Russell J. Chapman, went to live with their paternal grandparents for two years. Tim spent his teenage years living with his mother and with his maternal grandparents, who owned and operated ABC Bail Bonds in Denver. Tim claims to have made his first civilian arrest at the age of 14.

During his time working at his mother's bail bond business, Chapman met Duane "Dog" Chapman. Although the two share no blood relation, Dog refers to him as his "blood-brother". Later, Chapman joined Dog, Dog's long time girlfriend Beth Smith, and Dog's son Leland in Hawaii where they had started the Da Kine Bail Bonds company.

Chapman was a regular cast member for the first five seasons of Dog the Bounty Hunter.

== Arrests ==
=== First arrest ===
On September 14, 2006, Chapman was arrested along with Duane "Dog" Chapman and Leland Chapman by U.S. Marshals at the request of the Mexican government, and were to be extradited to Mexico to face charges of "deprivation of liberty". The charges stemmed from an incident where Chapman, Dog, and Leland were chasing fugitive and serial rapist Andrew Luster. They captured Luster on June 18, 2003, in Puerto Vallarta, Mexico. Shortly after the capture, the three were themselves arrested by Puerto Vallarta police officers; the three posted bail but never returned to Mexico for their court hearing on July 15, 2003.

The pair were released from custody on bail; Chapman and Leland's bail was set at $100,000 each, while Dog's was set at $300,000. After their release, all three were fitted with electronic bracelets, and were ordered to surrender their passports, and not leave the state of Hawaii. They faced an extradition hearing to Mexico, under the terms of treaties between the United States and Mexico.

On the August 5, 2007, episode of Larry King Live, it was announced that the charges filed against the three bounty hunters had been dropped by the Mexican government. If convicted, the three could have been sentenced to up to four years in prison.

=== Second arrest ===
In January 2008, prosecutors charged Tim Chapman with first-degree "terroristic threatening" following an incident at the Ala Moana Center in Honolulu, Hawaii. He was also charged with indecent exposure. Police and prosecutors stated that security guards recognized Chapman from his role of the show Dog the Bounty Hunter when they responded to a report of a man fondling himself in a vehicle at a parking lot on January 3, 2008. After a short court case, Chapman was acquitted and released. This followed a break-up with his second wife, Davina.
