= Max Factor Sr. =

Polish beautician and founder of Max Factor

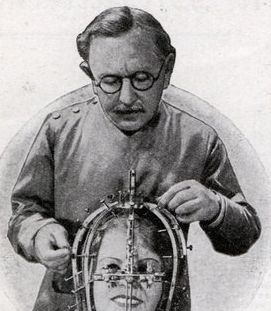
- Max Factor Sr. in 1935, demonstrating his beauty micrometer device
- Born: Maksymilian Faktorowicz; September 15, 1877; Zduńska Wola, Congress Poland, Russian Empire
- Died: August 30, 1938 (aged 60); Beverly Hills, California, U.S.
- Resting place: Hillside Memorial Park Cemetery, Culver City, California, U.S.
- Monuments: Hollywood Walk of Fame
- Citizenship: American (naturalized)
- Occupations: Entrepreneur; wig and cosmetics technician; inventor
- Years active: 1887–1938
- Known for: Max Factor Cosmetics
- Spouses: Esther Rosa "Lizzie" Faktorowicz (m. 1896; died 1906); Huma "Helen" Sradkowska (m. 1906; div. 1908); Jennie Cook (m. 1908)
- Children: 5, including Francis "Frank" Factor (Max Factor Jr.)
- Relatives: John Factor (half-brother); Andrew Luster (great-grandson)
- Awards: Honorary Academy Award (1929)

Max Factor Sr. (September 15, 1877 – August 30, 1938), born Maksymilian Faktorowicz, was a Polish-American businessman, beautician, entrepreneur and inventor. As a founder of the cosmetics giant Max Factor & Company, he largely developed the modern cosmetics industry in the United States and popularized the term "make-up" in noun form based on the verb.

He is also known for doing makeovers for starlets and giving them their signature looks; his most iconic works include Jean Harlow's platinum hair, Clara Bow's bob, Lucille Ball's false lashes and red curls, and Joan Crawford's "Hunter's Bow", or overdrawn lips.

== Early life ==
Factor, of Polish-Jewish descent, was born in Zduńska Wola (Note: The town was then situated in Congress Poland, subjugated by the Russian Empire) to Abraham Faktorowicz (1850/52 – before 1938) and Cecylia Wrocławska. His father, a hard-working grocer, rabbi, or textile mill worker (depending upon the source), could not afford a formal education for his four children.

By the age of eight, Factor was working as an assistant to a dentist and pharmacist. At the age of nine, he was apprenticed to a wig maker and cosmetician in Łódź. That experience enabled him to gain a position at Anton's of Berlin, a leading hairstylist and cosmetics creator. By the age of fourteen, he was working at Korpo, a Moscow wig maker and cosmetician to the Imperial Russian Grand Opera. He spent the years from age eighteen to twenty-two undertaking his compulsory military service in the Imperial Russian Army, where he served in the Hospital Corps.

Upon his discharge, he opened his own shop in the town of Ryazan, selling hand-made rouges, creams, fragrances, and wigs. He became well known when a traveling theatrical troupe wore Factor's cosmetics to perform for Russian nobility. The Russian nobility appointed Factor the official cosmetics expert for the royal family and the Imperial Russian Grand Opera, an honor which led to him being closely monitored. He married Esther Rosa (whom he called Lizzie) and by early 1904 they had produced three children, Freda, Cecilia and Davis. By 1904, concerned about the increasing anti-Jewish persecution developing in the Russian Empire, he and his wife decided to follow his brother Nathan and uncle Fischel to America. Worried that he would not be released from his royal service, he arranged with the assistance of a friend to take a rest cure at Karlovy Vary. According to another version he escaped with his family through the frosty woods straight into the harbor with a waiting ship. After meeting up with his family they traveled in the steerage class on board the S.S. Moltke III and were processed at Ellis Island on February 25, 1904; he had US$400 in his possession. They settled in St. Louis, Missouri.

== Life in the United States ==
He sold his rouges and creams at the 1904 World's Fair, operating under the newly re-spelled name Max Factor. His partner in the venture stole all of his stock and the profits. With assistance from his brother and uncle, Factor recovered and opened a barber's shop. In August 1904, Max and his wife had their fourth child, Francis "Frank" Factor. However, on March 17, 1906, his wife collapsed and died from a brain hemorrhage. Anxious to provide a mother for his four children, he married Huma "Helen" Sradkowska on 15 August 1906. Despite the birth of Louis on August 29, 1907, the marriage was short-lived and ended in a prolonged court battle, as result of which Factor obtained custody of all of his children.

== Creation of an empire ==
On January 21, 1908, Factor married Jennie Cook (March 1, 1886 – December 3, 1949), a neighbor.

Later that year, Factor moved his family to Los Angeles, California, when he saw an opportunity to provide made-to-order wigs and theatrical make-up to the growing film industry. Initially, he established a shop on South Central Avenue, and advertised the business as "Max Factor's Antiseptic Hair Store." After the foundation of "Max Factor & Company" in 1909, he soon became the West Coast distributor of Leichner and Minor, two leading theatrical make-up manufacturers. Greasepaint in stick form—although the accepted make-up for use on the stage—could not be applied thinly enough, nor were the colors appropriate, to work satisfactorily on the screen during the early years of movie-making.

Factor began experimenting with various compounds in an effort to develop a suitable make-up for the new film medium. By 1914, he had perfected the first cosmetic specifically created for motion picture use—a thinner greasepaint in cream form, packaged in a jar, and created in 12 precisely-graduated shades. Unlike theatrical cosmetics, it would not crack or cake.

With this major achievement to his credit, Max Factor became the authority on cosmetics for film making. Soon, movie stars were eager to sample the "flexible greasepaint," while movie producers sought Factor's human hair wigs. He allowed the wigs to be rented to the producers of old Westerns, on the condition that his sons were given parts. The boys would watch the expensive wigs.

Factor marketed a range of cosmetics to the public during the 1920s, and insisted that every girl could look like a movie star by using Max Factor cosmetics.

In the early years of the business, Factor personally applied his products to actors and actresses. He developed a reputation for being able to customize makeup to present actors and actresses in the best possible light on screen. Among his most notable clients were: Ben Turpin, Gloria Swanson, Mary Pickford, Pola Negri, Jean Harlow, Claudette Colbert, Bette Davis, Norma Shearer, Joan Crawford, Lucille Ball, and Judy Garland. As a result, virtually all of the major movie actresses were regular customers of the Max Factor beauty salon, located near Hollywood Boulevard. Max Factor's name appeared on many movie credits, and Factor appeared in some cameos.

Factor became a United States citizen in 1912.

In 1920, Max Factor gave in to Frank Factor's suggestion, and officially began referring to his products as "make-up." Until then, the term "cosmetics" had been used, because "make-up" was considered to be used only by people in the theatre or of dubious reputation—not something to be used in polite society.

== Death ==
In 1938, Factor was traveling in Europe on business with his son, Davis, when during a stopover in Paris, he received a note demanding money in exchange for his life. An attempt was made by the police using a decoy to capture the extortionist, but no one turned up at the agreed drop-off point to collect the money. Factor was so shaken by the threat that he returned to the US at the behest of a local doctor, where upon arrival, he took to his bed. Factor died on August 30, 1938, at the age of 60, in Beverly Hills, California. He was originally interred in the Beth Olam mausoleum at the Hollywood Cemetery in Los Angeles. His remains were moved many years later to Hillside Memorial Park Cemetery in Culver City, California.

== Honors and tributes ==
The Academy of Motion Picture Arts and Sciences presented Max Factor with an honorary Academy Award in 1929 for his contributions to the film industry. Additionally, Max Factor is honored with a star on the Hollywood Walk of Fame (at 6922 Hollywood Boulevard). Max Factor is mentioned in the classic song, "Hooray For Hollywood." In a reference to his creation of Clara Bow's heart-shaped lips, the song states, "To be an actor / See Mr. Factor / He'll make your pucker look good!"

== Family ==
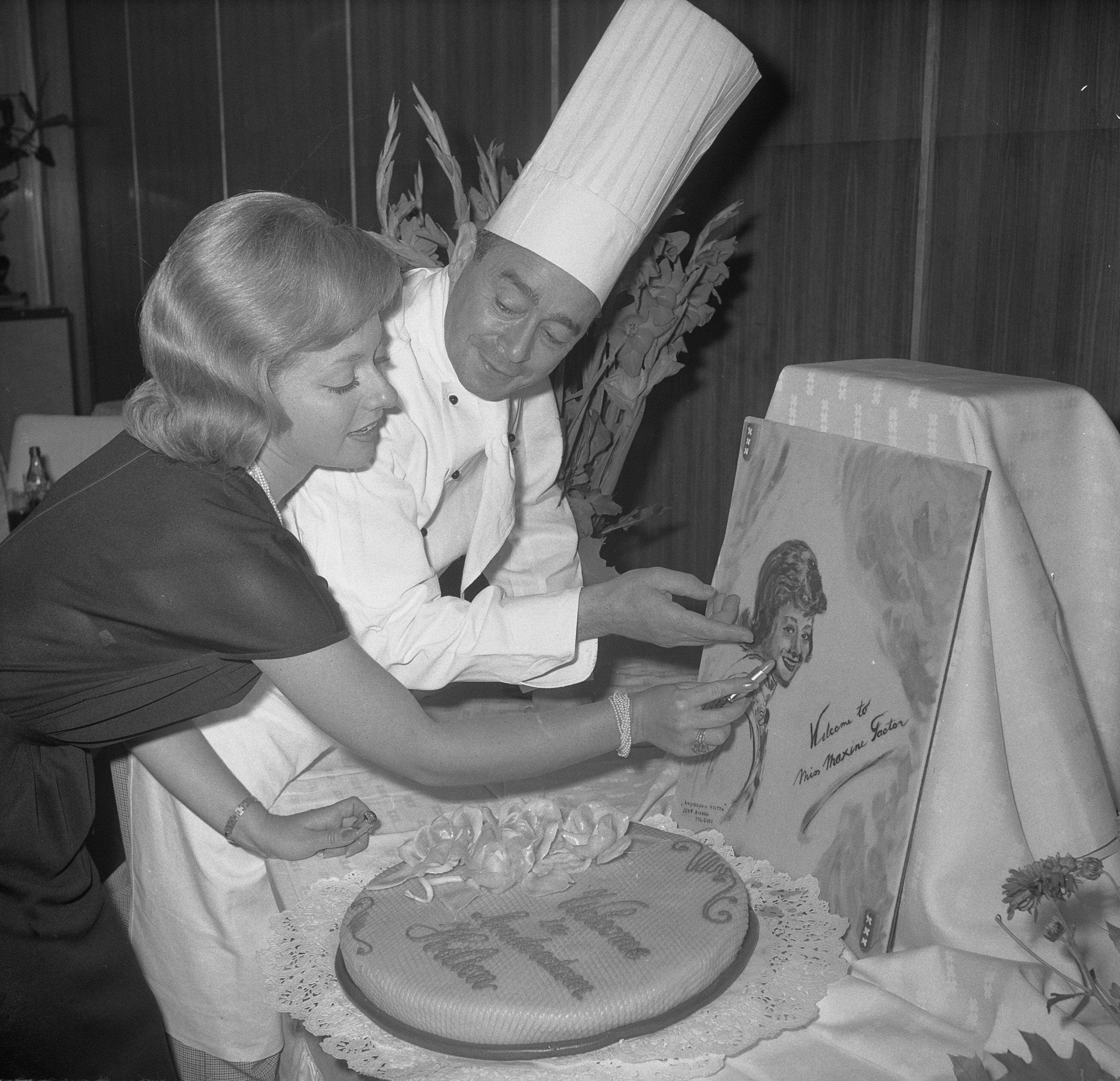
Maxine Nazworthy (1942-2020), daughter of Sidney B. Factor, in the Netherlands (1963)

Max Factor had six children:

- Freda Shore (January 22, 1898 – June 18, 1988)
- Cecilia Firestein (October 17, 1899 – May 28, 1984)
- Davis Factor (February 2, 1902 – August 31, 1991)
- Francis "Frank" Factor (later known as Max Factor Jr.; August 18, 1904 – June 7, 1996)
- Louis Factor (August 29, 1907 – December 1975)
- Sidney B. Factor (February 14, 1916 – December 15, 2005)

In 2003 Andrew Luster (born December 15, 1963), great-grandson (son of adopted granddaughter), was convicted of multiple sexual assaults involving the use of GHB to render his victims unconscious.

Max Factor's half-brother John (October 8, 1892 – January 22, 1984) was a Prohibition-era gangster and con-artist affiliated with the Chicago Outfit.
