= Dog the Bounty Hunter =

American reality television series

- Genre: Reality
- Starring: Duane "Dog" Chapman; Beth Chapman; Leland Chapman; Duane Lee Chapman Jr.; Lyssa Chapman
- Theme music composer: Ozzy Osbourne
- Opening theme: "Dog the Bounty Hunter"
- Country of origin: United States
- Original language: English
- No. of seasons: 8
- No. of episodes: 246

Production
- Executive producers: Daniel Elias; David Houts; David McKillop; Neil A. Cohen
- Camera setup: Multiple
- Running time: 21 minutes (Seasons 1–5; 8); 42 minutes (Season 6; 7)
- Production company: Hybrid Films

Original release
- Network: A&E
- Release: August 31, 2004 – June 23, 2012

Related
- Dog and Beth: On the Hunt (2013–2015) Dog and Beth: Fight of Their Lives (2017) Dog's Most Wanted (2019)

Dog the Bounty Hunter is an American reality television series which aired on A&E and chronicled Duane "Dog" Chapman's experiences as a bounty hunter. With a few exceptions, the series took place in Hawaii or Dog's home state of Colorado.

On May 21, 2012, A&E canceled the series after eight seasons. The series began airing in syndication on September 16, 2013. Dog and his wife, Beth Chapman, then starred in a spin-off series, Dog and Beth: On the Hunt on CMT, before that series ended in August 2015. On November 14, 2017, A&E announced that they would be airing a two-hour special called Dog and Beth: Fight of Their Lives. The special aired two weeks later, on November 27, documenting Beth Chapman and her family as she was fighting Stage 4 throat cancer. At the age of 51, she died on June 26, 2019, about a week after having lost consciousness and subsequently being placed in a medically induced coma.

A second spin-off series, entitled Dog's Most Wanted, premiered in September 2019 on WGN America. A third spin-off series entitled Dog's Unleashed, was in production and was set to premiere sometime in 2022 on the streaming service Unleashed, but it was canceled due to a breach of contract.

== Cast ==
- Duane "Dog" Chapman
- Beth Chapman, Dog's late wife
- Leland Chapman, Dog's son
- Tim "Youngblood" Chapman, Dog's "brother" (not related)
- "Baby" Lyssa Rae Chapman, Dog's daughter (seasons 2–8)
- Duane Lee Chapman Jr., Dog's son (season 2–8)
- Cecily Barmore-Chapman, Beth's daughter
- Justin Bihag (seasons 1–6), Dog's "nephew" (not related)
- Garry Chapman, Beth and Dog's son
- Bonnie Chapman, Beth and Dog's daughter

=== Supporting cast ===
- Sonny, bounty hunter
- Wesley, office manager
- Moon, Beth's best friend, Justin's mother
- Richie, bounty hunter
- Kaleo, bounty hunter
- T, office worker

== Production ==
The program spun off from Chapman's appearance on the show Take This Job, a program about people with unusual occupations. Dog the Bounty Hunter captured an audience immediately by drawing viewers into the interaction of Chapman and his family/team, mixing street smarts, romance, arguments, teamwork, adrenaline-laced arrests and a philosophy of hope and second chances.

Viewers are taken along as Chapman and his family/team locate and arrest people who have broken the terms of their bail agreements. Bounty hunts and arrests segue into the rides to jail, during which Chapman and his team show compassion and strongly counsel the fugitives to start over, leaving behind drugs and/or crime to become dependable members of their families and society. Rounding out most episodes are scenes featuring Dog, Beth and their large family of children, grandchildren and friends.

As the show progressed, viewers were taken further behind the scenes during Baby Lyssa's training as a licensed bail bondswoman and bounty hunter; Dog's capture of Andrew Luster and the ensuing arrests of Chapman, Tim and Leland in Mexico; the deaths of Beth's father (Garry Smith) and Dog's oldest daughter (Barbara Katie Chapman); Chapman and Beth's 2006 wedding; Baby Lyssa's wedding and the birth of her second child; and the shock and fear of the family after Dog, Tim and Leland were arrested by federal marshals in Hawaii to await possible extradition to Mexico.

Chapman and Beth freely invited viewers into their lives, sharing personal stories about Chapman's 1976 imprisonment; his ex-wives and custody battles; While Chapman was serving his sentence, his first wife LaFonda filed for divorce, and married his best friend. Chapman did field work for the prison, in addition to serving as the warden’s barber. When an inmate was attempting to escape, Chapman tackled him, which prevented the escapee from being shot at by guards. This, in addition to Chapman’s overall good behavior, led to him being paroled after only 18 months. Inspired by his tackle, Chapman decided to pursue becoming a bounty hunter once released.

=== Season 4 hiatus ===
Production and airing of the show was halted by A&E on November 2, 2007, after the release of an audio tape that featured Duane Chapman using the word "nigger" repeatedly in a discussion about the word itself with son Tucker regarding Tucker's black girlfriend's probable sensitivity to the word. Tucker had sold the tape to the National Enquirer, and it quickly was picked up by numerous print and broadcast media outlets. Chapman apologized and said he would make amends. On February 19, 2008, A&E announced that the show would return. Reruns of Dog the Bounty Hunter, along with never-before-seen episodes from season 4, began airing on June 25, 2008, and the show continued, along with special episodes about the arrest and fallout from the Luster situation.

=== Season 6 shooting ===
On April 21, 2009, during filming of Season 6, Chapman was allegedly shot at with a handgun while his crew, along with bail bondsman Bobby Brown, were attempting to arrest a fugitive named Hoang Nguyen in Colorado Springs, Colorado. The suspect escaped on a motorcycle and was captured by Chapman about six hours later. This is contrary to evidence shown in the A&E airing of the episode titled "Easy Rider", on December 16, 2009. According to Chapman's website and TMZ, Nguyen was arrested and charged with attempted murder related to the shooting attempt of Chapman and the Chapman family. On May 15, 2009, the El Paso County, Colorado Assistant District attorney dropped the attempted murder charge against the alleged shooter due to lack of evidence and conflicting statements by Chapman, his son Leland, and bail bondsman Bobby Brown. The prosecutors also state that they have not received the requested video footage from the incident, which was allegedly filmed by the television crew. In March 2011, Nguyen filed a lawsuit against Chapman, Brown, and Chapman's sons Duane Chapman II and Leland Chapman. In the lawsuit, Nguyen claims he lost his job as a result of the incident and had to relocate. He also says he was injured by pepper pellets that were allegedly fired at him. Chapman's attorney, James A. Quadra, told Celebrity Crime Reporter the lawsuit has no basis "in law or fact". The lawsuit was in mediation the first week of March 2011 with a trial date on November 28, 2011.

=== Lawsuit and sons quit ===
In 2011, Leland and Duane Lee quit working with their father and stepmother and severed ties with their family. The March 21, 2012 episode showed Duane Lee telling Beth "You want me fired, you gotta fire me," and then Leland weighed in, saying "I quit too." In January 2012, the two brothers confirmed leaving the show. Leland has operated his own bail bond companies in Alabama, heading Bounty Hunter Tactical Supply Co, and most recently in Hawaii, Kama'aina Bail Bonds. Duane Lee moved to Florida where he has kept a life out of the public eye. Beth tweeted, "It will take 6 weeks to get through the whole thing tonight's jus [sic] the beginning."

In September 2011 Bobby Brown, who appeared in 30 episodes, sued A&E Television Networks, Hybrid Films, and D&D Television Productions in Colorado federal court, claiming he was promised to be a full cast member, but received only $6,000 for his contributions. The lawsuit is for "the misappropriation of his publicity rights as well as claims of breach of contract and promises. In February 2012 Brown and A&E agreed to settle the lawsuit on undisclosed terms.

=== Music ===
The show's theme song, "Dog the Bounty Hunter", is sung by heavy metal artist Ozzy Osbourne. The song can be heard on Osbourne's Prince of Darkness box set. Many episodes feature at least one song from a band that is either unsigned or with an independent label, usually played during an action scene. These songs are plugged at the end of each episode, following the closing credits. Several episodes in season three and four have music from New York City-based dub reggae group Subatomic Sound System's On All Frequencies album. Featured songs include "Criminal", "Doin' It", and "Ghetto Champion". Soulja Boy's music video for "Yahhh!" includes an impersonation of "Dog Woof Woof"

== Series overview ==
The following summarizes the original broadcast presentation:

Season	Episodes	Originally released	
Season	Episodes	First released	Last released
1	17	August 31, 2004	January 25, 2005
2	23	April 5, 2005	January 31, 2006
3	27	March 21, 2006	November 28, 2006
4	20	April 10, 2007	October 29, 2008
5	38	February 4, 2009	September 9, 2009
6	24	December 2, 2009	August 11, 2010
7	21	October 6, 2010	April 6, 2011
8	23	January 4, 2012	June 23, 2012

All the hour-long episodes were split into two parts for broadcast syndication. Full episodes are shown on streaming sites and DVD releases.

== Home media ==
Note that not all episodes have been released on DVD.

DVD name	No.	Release date	Additional information
The Best of Season 1	7	January 25, 2005	Features Dog's episode of Take This Job, cast biographies and promos
The Best of Season 2	7	March 29, 2006	Features cast biographies and a pop-up dog hunting quiz
The Wedding Special	1	December 12, 2006	Features 5 featurettes titled: The Drama of Dog's Wedding Ring; Dance Lessons; Shopping with Beth; The Bow Wow Vow; A Tribute to Dog & Beth
The Best of Season 3	8	February 27, 2007	Features a photo gallery
The Arrest	1	September 25, 2007	Features additional scenes.; Also Features The Special Double Episode Year of the Dog
The Best of Season 4	8	August 26, 2008	
To Seize and Protect (The Best of Season 5)	8	September 8, 2009	
Crime is on the Run (The Best of Season 6)	8	July 27, 2010	
The Wild Ride Megaset	48	January 11, 2011	8-disc collection of previous releases: The Best of Seasons 1-6, The Wedding Special and The Arrest
This Family Means Business (The Best of Season 7, Part 1)	6	June 28, 2011	
Christmas Has Gone to the Dog	2	October 18, 2011	Contains two Christmas-themed episodes, one from Season 3 and the other from Season 6
Taking It to the Streets (The Best of Season 7, Part 2)	4	June 12, 2012	

== Books ==
The television series led to a 2007 autobiographical book, You Can Run But You Can't Hide, which chronicles Chapman's years before becoming a bounty hunter and some of his more infamous hunts, including the controversial hunt that took him and his team to Mexico to capture serial rapist Andrew Luster. It also delves into his criminal past as well as his family background, imprisonment in Texas, marriages and children. A second book, Where Mercy Is Shown, Mercy Is Given, was published in 2009. Its title reflects Chapman's overriding philosophy of second chances, which he writes about at length as he asks the public for a second chance of his own. The book largely deals with the fallout from two factors: the federal marshals' arrest and the scandal over his use of the word "nigger".

== In popular culture ==
Chapman has been referenced in live action productions:

- In Season 3, Episode 13 of Boston Legal, "Dumping Bella", Chapman is referred to by Alan as one of the only two people he truly admires and as such the only candidate besides Shirley herself to be his costume for the party.
- In Season 3, Episode 9 of 30 Rock, Jenna says "Now Dog the Bounty Hunter is the second grossest guy I've been with."
- In Season 2, Episode 4 of The Eric Andre Show, a lookalike of Dog is featured in the episode with an impersonator of George Clooney.

Chapman has also been parodied in both animation and print:

- In the American Dad! episode "Joint Custody", Roger dresses up as Chapman and tries to hunt down Jeff Fischer.
- In the Family Guy episode "Something, Something, Something, Dark Side", Stewie calls a bounty hunter meeting and Chapman is briefly seen.
- In the South Park episode "Miss Teacher Bangs a Boy", Eric Cartman dressed up as Chapman and had a TV show filmed of himself, Beth and Chapman's familiar crew after he was made a school hall monitor.
- In the Nickelodeon TV series The Mighty B!, Bessie's dog Happy dressed up as Chapman and tried to find the person who pulled the fire alarm at the Bee scouts' troop-house.
- Chapman and the TV show were both parodied on Cartoon Network's television program, Mad, as "Frog the Bounty Hunter", showing events of the show as the video game Frogger.
- The song "Dog Catchers" on Insane Clown Posse's The Mighty Death Pop! is disparaging to Dog the Bounty Hunter.
- The series was parodied in the June 2007 issue of Mad magazine as Dud the Lousy Hunter.
- In the Squidbillies episode "Fatal Distraction", Early Cuyler acquires a GPS system for his truck, which he attempts to use to hunt down Osama bin Laden. Cuyler briefly dresses as Chapman to pursue bin Laden before "calling it a night" and going to a strip club.
- There's also an obvious parody to the "Dog" character in The Simpsons episode named "Sex, Pies and Idiot Scrapes" where a character named "Wolf, the Bounty Hunter" is hired by Lucky Jim to hunt down Gil Gunderson.
- Dog and his show were referred to in a 2015 episode of Last Week Tonight with John Oliver which was satirically critical of the American bail system.
- In Season 2, Episode 44 of Sonic Boom, Vector the Crocodile is the host of a reality TV show similarly to Dog.
- In an episode of Reno 911!, Tommy Hawk (a character inspired from Dog and his TV show) works with the characters from Reno 911 to apprehend a criminal who jumped bail.
