= Max Factor Jr. =

American businessman

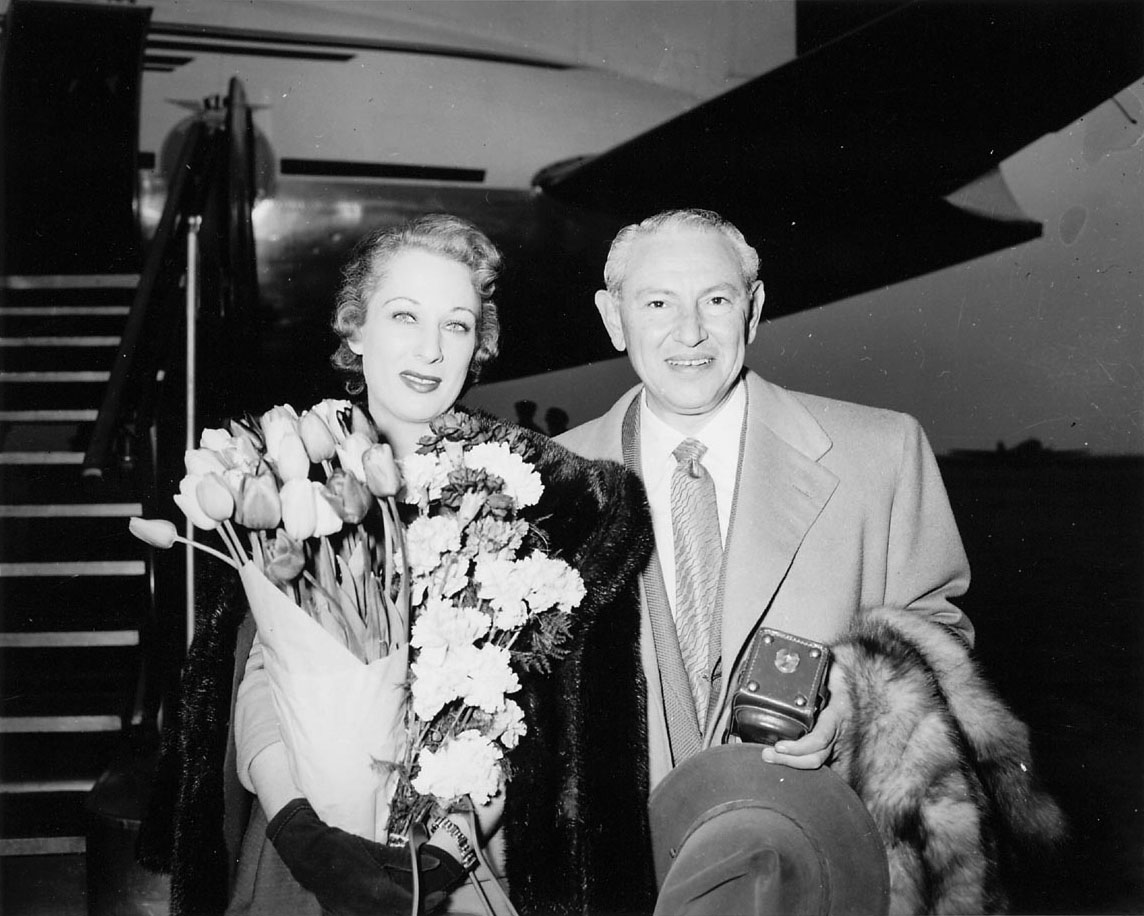
- Arrival of Max Factor Jr. and his wife, Mildred “Milly” Cohen, Schiphol; April 17, 1953
- Born: Francis Factor; August 18, 1904; St. Louis, Missouri, US
- Died: June 7, 1996 (aged 91); Los Angeles, California, US
- Resting place: Hillside Memorial Park Cemetery
- Occupations: Businessman, racehorse owner/breeder
- Known for: President, Max Factor & Company cosmetics
- Board member of: Max Factor & Company
- Spouse: Mildred "Milly" Cohen
- Children: 2
- Parent(s): Max Factor Sr. Esther Rosa

Francis Factor (August 18, 1904 – June 7, 1996), also known as Max Factor Jr., was an American businessman who was president of the Max Factor Cosmetics empire.

== Early life ==
He was born Francis Factor in St. Louis, Missouri, the son of Max Factor, a Polish-Jewish businessman and cosmetics pioneer. Known as "Frank," his family moved to Los Angeles, California, in 1908 where he began working in the family business while still a boy.

== Career ==
Because Max Factor was recovering from being hit by a delivery van at the time, Frank Factor took the lead over the two years that it took to develop a suitable make-up for use with the newly developed Technicolor film. This make-up was released to the film industry under the name "Pan-Cake". It was immediately a hit and its advantages led to women stealing it from the film sets and using it privately. Its only disadvantage for everyday use was that it could not be used at night as it made the skin too dark under all except under the powerful lights used in film studios. While his father wanted to reserve the product for film use, Frank Factor was open to the commercial possibilities and began developing lighter shades. At the time the company was only able to produce enough to meet studio demand which until production could be increased delayed commercial release until 1937. Backed by a colour based national advertising campaign, it immediately became the fastest and largest selling single make-up item to date, as well as the standard make-up used in all Technicolor films.

After his father's death in 1938, Frank Factor legally changed his name to Max Factor Jr. and as president expanded the still private cosmetics firm, along with members of the immediate family. He was heavily involved with the development of new products, particularly "Tru-Color" released in 1940 as the first smear-proof lipstick.

== Personal life ==
Max Factor Jr. was married in 1933 to Mildred "Milly" Cohen with whom he remained for thirty-seven years until her death in 1970. He had a home in the Deep Well neighborhood of Palm Springs, California. Factor died in 1996 and was interred in the Hillside Memorial Park Cemetery in Culver City, California.
