= Duane Chapman =

American bounty hunter and TV personality

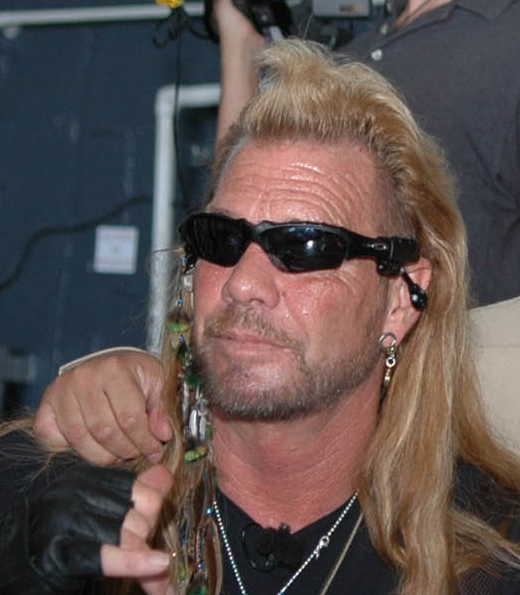
- Chapman in 2005
- Born: February 2, 1953 (age 73); Denver, Colorado, U.S.
- Other name: Dog the Bounty Hunter
- Occupations: Television Personality; Bounty Hunter
- Years active: 1973–present
- Television: Dog the Bounty Hunter, Dog and Beth: On the Hunt, Dog's Most Wanted
- Height: 5 ft 7 in (170 cm)
- Spouses: La Fonda Sue Honeycutt (m. 1972; div. 1977); Anne M. Tegnell (m. 1979; div. 1982); Lyssa Rae Brittain (m. 1982; div. 1991); Tawny Marie (m. 1991; div. 2002); Beth Smith (m. 2006; died 2019); Francie Frane (m. 2021)
- Children: 13, including Leland and Lyssa
- Website: dogthebountyhunter.com

Duane Lee Chapman Sr. (born February 2, 1953), also known as Dog the Bounty Hunter, is an American television personality, bounty hunter, and former bail bondsman.

Chapman came to international notice as a bounty hunter for his successful capture of Max Factor heir Andrew Luster in Mexico in 2003 and, the following year, was given his own series, Dog the Bounty Hunter (2004–2012), on A&E. After Dog the Bounty Hunter ended, Chapman appeared in Dog and Beth: On the Hunt (2013–2015), a similarly formatted TV show, alongside his wife and business partner, Beth Chapman, on CMT. His latest series, Dog's Most Wanted, aired on WGN America in late 2019.

== Early life ==
=== Childhood ===
Chapman was born February 2, 1953, in Denver, Colorado, to Wesley Duane Chapman (1930 – 2000), a Korean War veteran, and Barbara Darlene Chapman (nee Cowell; 1934 – 1994), a Sunday school teacher associated with the Assemblies of God USA. His father was a welder but changed careers later in life, becoming a bail bondsman after Chapman became one. Chapman had stated that his father was physically abusive.

Chapman has three siblings: Jolene, Michael, and Paula. Chapman has claimed to have Native American heritage.

At the age of 15, Chapman joined the Devils Diciples, an outlaw motorcycle club, and ran away from home.

=== Murder of Jerry Bowers Oliver ===
In the late hours of September 15, 1976, 23-year-old Chapman, 22-year-old Donald Kuykendall, 17-year-old Cheryl Fisher, and 19-year-old Ruben Garza armed themselves and drove to 1072 South Prairie Drive, the home of Jerry Bowers Oliver, a 34-year-old resident of Pampa, Texas. Oliver was known to sell marijuana and the group planned to rob him. Kuykendall entered Oliver's home while Chapman, Fisher, and Garza waited outside by their vehicle. Around 11:40 p.m., Kuykendall shot Oliver in the armpit at close range with a sawn-off shotgun and the group fled the scene. Police were called to Prairie Drive and Oliver, still conscious, gave officers Kuykendall and Chapman's names. Oliver died on September 16, 1976, while undergoing emergency surgery at Northwest Texas Hospital in Amarillo, Texas, around 3:30 a.m.

Police arrived at Chapman's residence at 501 Roberta Street on September 16, 1976, to arrest him. Chapman attempted to evade officers by leaving through the back door of his home but was caught and taken to the jail in Gray County. His bond was set at $10,000 (the equivalent of a $56,000 bond in 2024). Kuykendall, Fisher, and Garza were also arrested. Donnie Barton, who had been with the group earlier that evening but did not go with them to Prairie Drive, told police the group had discussed their plan to steal marijuana from Oliver's home in front of him and that they referred to Oliver as "nigger".

On July 22, 1977, a jury of seven men and five women found Chapman, Kuykendall, and Garza guilty of murder. Though Chapman was outside when Kuykendall shot Oliver, he had brought his own weapon and supplied Kuykendall with shotgun cartridges and for that, the jury found him culpable. Fisher avoided going to trial by pleading guilty the week prior. Chapman was given a five-year prison sentence. He served 18 months at the Texas State Penitentiary in Huntsville, Texas before being paroled.

In a 2007 interview with Fox News, Chapman said that while serving his sentence, he tackled an inmate about to be shot for attempting to escape, and a congratulatory remark by a corrections officer inspired him to become a bounty hunter later. As a result of his felony conviction, Chapman is prohibited from owning firearms and has been refused entry to the United Kingdom.

== Career ==
=== Capture of Andrew Luster ===
On June 18, 2003, Chapman made international news by capturing Max Factor cosmetics heir Andrew Luster, who had fled the United States in the middle of his trial on charges of drugging and raping a number of women. Luster had been convicted in absentia on 86 counts, including multiple rape charges connected to assaults in 1996, 1997, and 2000. Chapman was assisted by his hunt team, which consisted of his son, Leland, and an associate, Tim Chapman (no relation). The three bounty hunters captured Luster in Puerto Vallarta, Mexico, where they had been living under assumed names. On their way to bring Luster to the San Diego jail, they were pulled over by Mexican police, and all four of them were jailed. Dog and Leland were arrested under suspicion of drug use. Once the authorities confirmed Luster's identity, he was sent to California to face his 125-year sentence.

Chapman and his team, still in the Mexican jail, were initially denied bail, but after his wife Beth alerted the media and aroused public opinion in the United States, they were granted bail. Once out of jail on bail, they followed their attorney's advice and fled the jurisdiction, thereby becoming international bail-jumpers. On September 14, 2006, days before the expiration of the statute of limitations, Chapman, along with his son Leland Chapman and associate Tim Chapman, were arrested by United States Marshals, and jailed in Honolulu on behalf of the Mexican government.

Mexican authorities had charged all three with "deprivation of liberty", involving the 2003 arrest of Andrew Luster, because bounty hunting is illegal in Mexico. Since they did not obtain permission to leave the country while out on bail in 2003, the Mexican Government declared the three of them fugitives from justice and tried to get them extradited to Mexico for sentencing. After spending one night in the federal detention center in Honolulu, Chapman told reporters "The federal marshals treated us with great respect. But let me tell you, you never want to go to a federal prison, because it's terrible."

The next day, September 15, 2006, Chapman appeared in a packed Honolulu courtroom with his ankles shackled. Although the judge agreed that the men were not a significant flight risk, he ordered that each wear an electronic monitoring device around the ankle. The three men were released on bail ($300,000 for Duane Chapman, $100,000 each for Leland Chapman and Tim Chapman). Chapman's lead attorney, Brook Hart, reportedly planned to argue that although the charge Chapman faced is a misdemeanor in Mexico, when translated into English, the charge of kidnapping became a felony under American law. Mexican authorities dismissed Hart's claim and insisted that Chapman had, in fact, been charged with a felony. An extradition hearing was set for November 16, 2006.

Chapman has speculated that his arrest was due in part to a possible prisoner exchange agreement between the Mexican and American authorities. According to Chapman, the federal agents "sold him out", by trading him in for a convicted Mexican drug lord. Duane, Leland, and Tim had their ankle bracelets removed so they could work. On October 11, 2006, reports surfaced of an open letter dated September 26, 2006, sent on Chapman's behalf by 29 Republican Congressmen to U.S. Secretary of State Condoleezza Rice. The letter stated the authors' opposition to Chapman's extradition and requested that Rice deny Mexico's request for same. Subsequently, on October 20, 2006, lawyers for Chapman stated the Mexican federal court had granted them an order halting the criminal case against the bounty hunter until further evidence and witness testimony was gathered. A court hearing was held on December 23, 2006. The original hearing was postponed due to a report from a lower court having not yet been received. The court heard both sides of the story then decided to recess. Court proceedings then started on January 16, 2007, and the court had until Tuesday, February 6, 2007, but the deadline was extended.

On February 16, 2007, a Mexican federal court ruled there was no reason not to try Chapman on the charge of deprivation of liberty in Mexico. In response, on February 23, Hawaii State Representatives Gene Ward, Karen Awana, Rida Cabanilla, Lynn Finnegan, Barbara Marumoto, Colleen Meyer, Kymberly Pine, Joe Bertram, Ken Ito, Marylin Lee, and John Mizuno introduced House Concurrent Resolution 50, "Requesting the President of Mexico and the Second District Court of Guadalajara to drop extradition charges against TV Bounty Hunter, Duane 'Dog' Chapman". The resolution was passed by the International Affairs committee on March 7.

During this time, Chapman, along with his new attorney, William C. Bollard, appeared on numerous media shows. Some of these include: Larry King Live, Greta Van Susteren, Mark and Mercedez Morning Show on Mix 94.1 KMXB in Las Vegas, The Morning Show with Mike and Juliet on WFLD, Fox 6 News San Diego, The Glenn Beck Program, and THE 9 on Yahoo!. Honolulu news outlet KHNL reported on August 1, 2007, the arrest warrant issued for Chapman and his associates might be invalidated, as a Mexican court had found the statute of limitations regarding the arrest had expired. The 15-page legal order was released in Spanish, and was translated and verified for legal accuracy.

On September 29, 2006, Chapman received permission to have the electronic monitoring device removed temporarily so that he could travel to the East Coast for previously planned appearances. On August 2, 2007, the First Criminal Court in Puerto Vallarta, Mexico, dismissed all criminal charges pending against Duane, Leland, and Tim Chapman, on the grounds the statute of limitations had expired. The order effectively canceled all pending charges. The prosecution appealed the ruling; this is standard practice in Mexico, according to A&E. On November 5, 2007, U.S. Magistrate Judge Barry Kurren dismissed the extradition attempt, saying that even though the cases were appealed, the trio are no longer charged with any crimes.

=== Dog the Bounty Hunter ===
Chapman, after decades of bounty hunting, was featured on Take This Job, a program about people with unusual occupations. This led him and the show's production company to do a spin-off about his work in capturing bail fugitives, in particular Chapman's efforts in hunting down Andrew Luster in Puerto Vallarta, Mexico. After Luster's jailing, Chapman was interviewed for the August 28, 2003, episode of the truTV television series Dominick Dunne's Power, Privilege, and Justice. By now Chapman's profile had come to the attention of the American public. It was during this time A&E decided to create an ongoing reality series around his bounty hunting job. On August 30, 2004, the first series of Dog the Bounty Hunter made its television debut, running for eight seasons before being canceled in 2012. The theme song was performed by Ozzy Osbourne.

In early October 2007, Chapman gained negative public attention after a private phone conversation between him and his son, Tucker, was sold to the National Enquirer. The conversation was about the relationship his son was having with a black woman. During the recording, Chapman can be heard referring to his son's girlfriend as a "nigger", discussing the word use in his household, and expressing his disdain for interracial relationships. Once the tape was made public, A&E announced it was suspending production of Chapman's TV series pending an investigation. On October 31, 2007, Chapman issued a public apology, saying that while he knew he should not have used a racial slur, that no black person had ever told him they were offended by his use of the word. On November 2, 2007, A&E announced it was nonetheless removing the show from their schedule "for the foreseeable future."

On February 19, 2008, A&E released a statement that said Chapman had "taken and continues to take the appropriate steps in reaching out to several African American organizations in an effort to make amends for his private comments" and announced that Chapman's TV show would return to production. He addressed it again in 2021, in an interview with Entertainment Tonight host Kevin Frazier, denying that he was racist and saying he "had more black friends than Eminem."

=== Dog and Beth: On the Hunt ===
On September 25, 2012, CMT announced it had ordered a new reality series which would begin airing in April 2013. The new series, titled Dog and Beth: On the Hunt, featured Chapman, his wife Beth, and Chapman's son Leland visiting failing bail bond agencies across the country, giving them advice on how to turn their businesses around, and assisting in the capture of their most wanted fugitives.

The show's pilot episode featured Chapman and his son Leland working together for the first time since Leland left the previous show in 2012. The show ran for three seasons, airing until its cancellation in 2016.

=== Dog's Most Wanted ===
In 2019, an additional spin-off featuring Dog and Beth called Dog's Most Wanted, airing for a single season.

=== Dog Unleashed ===
On October 8, 2021, The New York Times reported that Chapman was being sued for US$1.3 million for breach of contract regarding his conduct while filming a television series that would've been titled Dog Unleashed. While searching for Brian Laundrie, Chapman was reportedly in illegal possession of a taser and made homophobic and racist comments, resulting in the show's cancellation. While Chapman denied the claims against him, his daughter Bonnie said the allegations of homophobia and racism against him were true and his daughter Cecily called her father's search for Laundrie a "publicity stunt". Chapman then went onto say that Bonnie and Cecily were working for people who were seeking to get revenge by tarnishing his reputation. Chapman has denied the accusations made in the suit.

=== Later work ===
In September 2021, Chapman became involved in the manhunt for Brian Laundrie following the killing of Gabby Petito.

=== Author ===
In 2007, Chapman released his autobiography, You Can Run But You Can't Hide (co-written with Laura Morton). The book debuted at #1 on the New York Times bestseller list.

His second book, Where Mercy Is Shown, Mercy Is Given was published in 2010, also co-authored with Morton.

In 2024, Chapman released Nine Lives and Counting: A Bounty Hunter’s Journey to Faith, Hope, and Redemption.

=== Other appearances ===
- Chapman and Beth made appearances as themselves on the Canadian television series Corner Gas in 2008.
- In early 2022, Chapman competed on season 7 of The Masked Singer as “Armadillo” from “Team Good” he was eliminated on April 13, 2022, alongside Jennifer Holliday as “Miss Teddy” from “Team Cuddly”.

== Personal life ==
Chapman's first marriage was to LaFonda Sue Honeycutt by whom he has two children, Duane Lee Chapman II and Leland Blane Chapman. Both sons would go on to work with Chapman at Da'Kine Bail Bonds in Honolulu, Hawaii, and appear on TV alongside their father. LaFonda filed for divorce from Chapman in 1977, after he was charged with homicide. She remarried Jim Darnell and had two daughters, Hannah and Britney, with him.

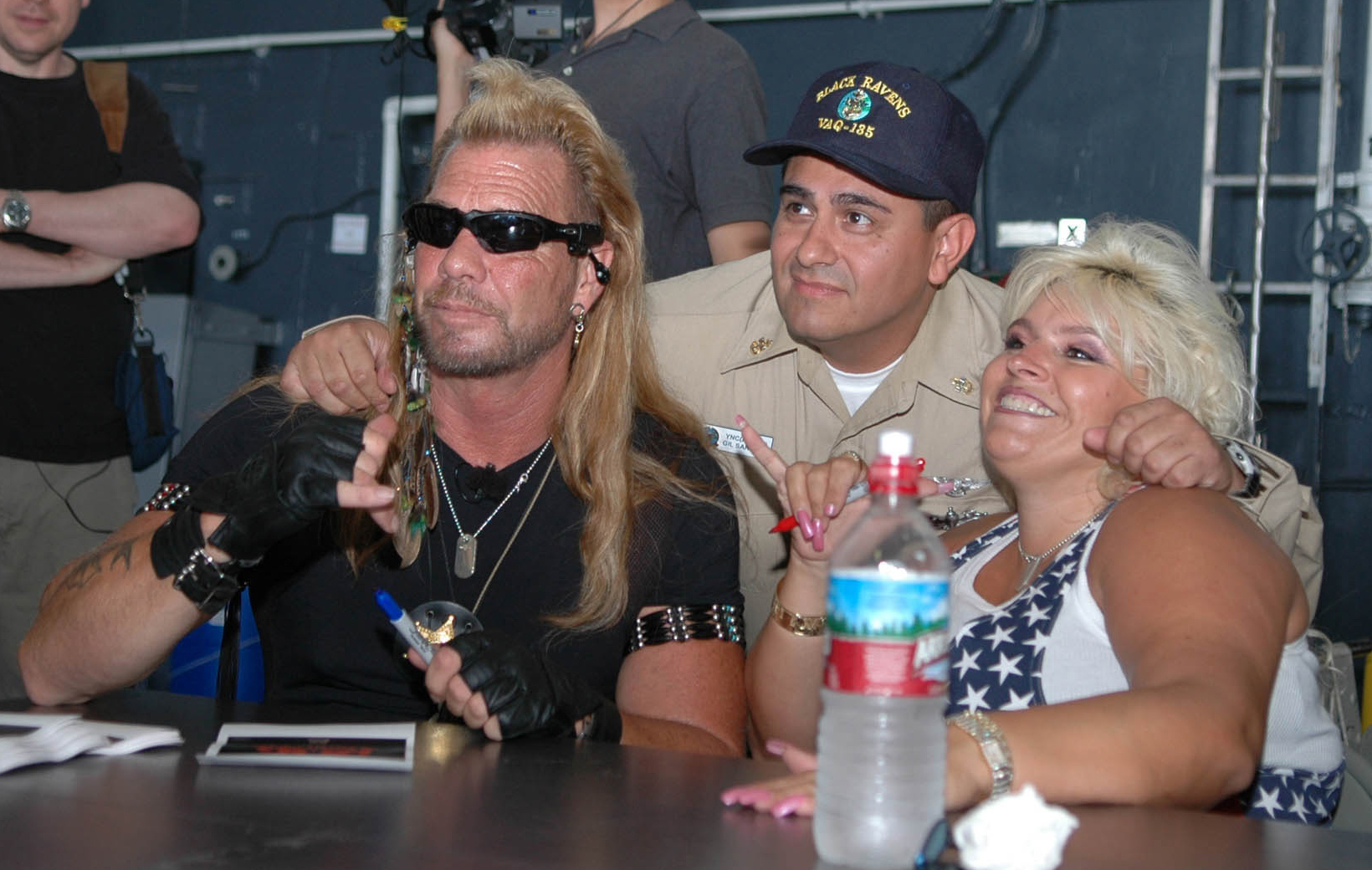
Dog and Beth Chapman signing autographs during a visit aboard the nuclear-powered aircraft carrier USS Nimitz on May 20, 2005, Pearl Harbor, Hawaii.

His second marriage was to Ann Tegnell, with whom he has three children, Zebadiah Chapman, Wesley Chapman (born 1980), and James Robert "J. R." Chapman (born 1982). They met in 1979, shortly after Chapman was released from prison. Tegnell was 17 years old when she became pregnant with Zebadiah and he feared that by having been intimate with a minor, he would be made to return to prison for violating his parole. To avoid potential legal ramifications, Chapman decided to propose to Tegnell, even though he did not love her. The two wed on August 22, 1979, in Colorado. Zebadiah was born prematurely on January 1, 1980, and died less than a month later. They divorced sometime after the birth of Wesley but later reconciled, resulting in her becoming pregnant with James. After they separated permanently, Ann was granted custody of Wesley and James and moved to Utah. Wesley was ultimately raised by his maternal grandmother, and both sons were kept from being able to communicate with Chapman. Wesley and James reunited with Chapman as adults.

His third marriage was to Lyssa Rae "Big Lyssa" Brittain (née Greene). The marriage was reportedly performed by a Native American chief in the Colorado mountains in 1982, and ended on November 20, 1991. The two had met just days prior in a bar, while Lyssa was still married to her husband, an Assemblies of God minister, though the two had since separated due to his infidelity. According to Chapman, he offered Lyssa $1,000 to have his child, to which she agreed. They had three children together, Barbara Katie Chapman (June 8, 1982 – May 19, 2006), Tucker Dee Chapman (September 8, 1983), and Lyssa Rae Chapman (June 10, 1987). The family lived in Denver, Colorado, in a home left to Chapman by his grandfather Mike, along with Duane Lee and Leland. According to Chapman's daughter Lyssa, she and her siblings reportedly endured a hard childhood, with incidents of sexual abuse and substance abuse plaguing the family.

His fourth marriage was to Tawny Marie Chapman. The two met in 1988, after Chapman arrested her on a drug possession charge, and she subsequently became his secretary. The two married in 1992, separated in 1994, and officially divorced in 2002. The two had no children together, though Chapman's children did refer to her as their mother during the couple’s relationship. In his autobiography, You Can Run But You Can't Hide, Chapman referred to the marriage as "a disaster from the start," alleging she was addicted to amphetamines.

His fifth marriage was to Alice Elizabeth "Beth" Barmore (née Smith; October 29, 1967 – June 26, 2019), with whom he had an on-again-off-again relationship, until the two married on May 20, 2006, at a Hilton hotel in Waikoloa Village, Hawaii. They had two children together, Bonnie Joanne Chapman (born December 16, 1998) and Garry Chapman (February 7, 2001), and Chapman adopted Beth's daughter from her previous marriage, Cecily Barmore-Chapman (née Barmore; born June 19, 1993). Chapman was also able to help Beth locate and reconcile with her son, Dominic Davis (born 1985), who was born to her when she was a teenager and subsequently placed for adoption. Dog and Beth operated Da'Kine Bail Bonds together. Beth died on June 26, 2019, at The Queen's Medical Center in Honolulu, as a result of throat cancer. She had been diagnosed with the disease in 2017. In 2021, their daughter Bonnie accused Chapman of having been unfaithful to Beth throughout their marriage.

On August 23, 2021, TMZ reported that Chapman was engaged to Francie Frane. The two reportedly met six months after Beth's passing, and like Chapman, Frane had been recently widowed, having lost her husband, Robert "Bob" Frane in December 2018. They announced their engagement in May 2020 and married in Colorado on September 2, 2021. They later moved to Marco Island, Florida. Frane has two sons from previous relationships.

Chapman has one child out of wedlock, his eldest child Christopher Michael Hecht (born 1972), who was born to his ex-girlfriend, Debbie White, while he was serving an 18-month prison sentence. Debbie kept her pregnancy from Chapman and died of suicide in 1978, leading the boy to be adopted by Keith and Gloria Hecht. Hecht has reportedly struggled with drug and alcohol addiction since at least 1991, and has a lengthy criminal history, including a history of hate crimes.

=== Political views ===
Chapman spoke out against changes to bail laws in New Jersey and Colorado at various times between 2017 and 2021, arguing such changes endangered the public by allowing release of violent criminals and also harmed victims of crime. In 2021, Chapman opposed Senate Bill 62 (SB21-062), introduced in the Colorado General Assembly. The bill sought to restrict bail bondsmen in the state from issuing surety bonds for individuals arrested for misdemeanors, low-level felonies, and certain drug offenses, instead allowing the accused to arrange for their own release through personal recognizance, the stated goal being to lower the number of inmates in Colorado prisons. The bill did not pass.

In September 2022, at an Evangelical Christian conference in Council Bluffs, Iowa called "Opening the Heavens," Chapman gave a speech on stage in which he referred to U.S President Joe Biden as "little Hitler" and alleged that voter fraud was responsible for Donald Trump failing to win his re-election campaign. He predicted that Republicans would sweep the 2022 midterms and that "little Hitler" President Biden might commit suicide just like Hitler did after being "caught."

In April 2024, in a Fox News interview with Jesse Watters, Watters asked Chapman that if Donald Trump were re-elected as president of the United States, would Chapman like to be a "deportation czar," referring to the population of illegal immigrants residing in the United States; Chapman said he "would like a job like that."
