= Dog and Beth: On the Hunt =

American reality television series

- Genre: Reality
- Starring: Duane "Dog" Chapman; Beth Chapman; Leland Chapman; Cecily Chapman
- Theme music composer: Saliva
- Opening theme: "Hunt You Down"
- Country of origin: United States
- Original language: English
- No. of seasons: 3
- No. of episodes: 47

Production
- Executive producers: Alan Deutsch; Rob VanAlkemade; Ben Silverman; Beth Chapman; Corie Henson; Chris Grant; Duane Chapman; Matt Trierweile
- Running time: 39 minutes- 42 minutes
- Production companies: Electus; Entertainment By Bonnie and Clyde

Original release
- Network: CMT
- Release: April 21, 2013 – August 22, 2015

Related
- Dog the Bounty Hunter (2004–2012); Dog and Beth: Fight Of Their Lives (2017); Dog's Most Wanted (2019)

Dog and Beth: On the Hunt is an American reality television series and spin-off of Dog the Bounty Hunter that aired on CMT and debuted on April 21, 2013. It was announced on May 21, 2013, that CMT had ordered additional episodes of the first season. New episodes returned on August 24, 2013. Season 2 premiered on June 14, 2014, and ended in October 2014. Season 3 premiered on July 18, 2015, and ended in August 2015.

Beth Chapman announced on January 12, 2016, that the Chapmans were leaving CMT (with all rights to the show and other shows featuring the team), effectively cancelling the show.

A third spin-off, Dog's Most Wanted, on WGN America premiered in September 2019.

== Premise ==
Each week, the Chapmans, their son Leland, and Leland's son Dakota fly from their Da Kine Bail Bonds headquarters in Hawaii to various bail bondsmen businesses around the United States as they assist in apprehending criminals. The series also encompass the group as they improve the bail bondsmen businesses techniques on how to run more efficiently, from the writing of bonds to the tedious task of tracking criminals and technological device training.

In the season three finale, Dakota quit the business after a falling out with his father and Leland announced he has moved to Alabama for a fresh start.

== Cast ==
- Duane "Dog" Chapman
- Beth Chapman
- Leland Chapman
- Cecily Chapman
- Dakota Chapman (Season 1–2)

== Episodes ==
=== Series overview ===
Season	Episodes	Originally released	
Season	Episodes	First released	Last released
Pilot		April 14, 2013	
1	18	April 21, 2013	October 26, 2013
Special		November 2, 2013	
2	15	June 14, 2014	October 4, 2014
3	12	July 18, 2015	August 22, 2015

=== Pilot (2013) ===
Title	Original release date
"A New Beginning"	April 14, 2013
Fifteen months have passed since Dog and Beth left television, this two-hour preview episode goes behind-the-scenes to find out how the family reunites.

=== Season 1 (2013) ===
No. overall	No. in season	Title	Original release date
1	1	"Dog's New Tricks"	April 21, 2013
The Chapmans head to Denver, Colorado to assist Mike Vester of Bail City Bail Bonds and his team. Mike's company has several fugitives fleeing custody while the time to capture two big money jumps is closing.
2	2	"Big Trouble in Little Clovis"	April 28, 2013
The Chapmans fly to Clovis, New Mexico to answer Bail Bondsman Hank Bayless' call for help. Hank is ready for retirement and to pass down the business to his daughter and granddaughter but that is on hold until his two most wanted fugitives are captured.
3	3	"Family Bonds"	May 5, 2013
Tony Madrid, located in Albuquerque, New Mexico and owner of Madrid Family Bail Bonds, has requested the help of the Chapmans. The Madrid family teams up with the Chapmans to gain support and lobby a necessary bail bond and bounty hunter legislation at the State Capitol. Next, the fugitives who seem to always slip away are pursued and captured.
4	4	"Going to Jackson"	May 12, 2013
Agent J, located in Jackson, Michigan, alerts the Chapmans that assistance is needed with bondsman Leo Urban who needs to apprehend a $500,000 fugitive bond.
5	5	"L.A. Consequential"	May 19, 2013
The Chapmans head to Los Angeles to assist Arnold with tightening up his business techniques and catch his most wanted fugitive.
6	6	"Norwalk This Way"	June 2, 2013
Blazen Bail Bonds, featuring all-female crew, has called for the Chapmans' help. They need to catch their $100,000 running bond or risk shutting the business down.
7	7	"Viva Dog Vegas"	June 9, 2013
The Academy of Country Music Awards and Professional Bail Agents of the United States are being held in Las Vegas, and the Chapmans are in town. Beth is the senior vice president of PBUS while Dog and Leland assist bail bondsmen in the area to catch their fleeing fugitives.
8	8	"Doglahoma: A Fistful of Warrants"	June 16, 2013
9	9	"Doglahoma 2: For a Few Bounties More"	June 30, 2013
10	10	"Paradise Lost"	July 7, 2013
11	11	"Dog Days of Kansas"	July 14, 2013
12	12	"Training Dakota"	August 24, 2013
13	13	"Rock Bottom Bounty"	August 31, 2013
14	14	"Big Sky Bounty"	September 7, 2013
15	15	"Southern Fried Bounty"	September 14, 2013
16	16	"Handcuffed"	October 12, 2013
17	17	"Divine Intervention"	October 19, 2013
18	18	"Trouble at Home"	October 26, 2013

=== Special (2013) ===
Title	Original release date
"Best of Dog and Beth: On The Hunt"	November 2, 2013

=== Season 2 (2014) ===
No. overall	No. in season	Title	Original release date
19	1	"Action in Jackson: Part 1"	June 14, 2014
20	2	"Action In Jackson: Part II"	June 21, 2014
21	3	"Rites of Passage"	June 28, 2014
22	4	"Fathers and Sons"	July 5, 2014
23	5	"Popcorn Bounty"	July 12, 2014
24	6	"Love Conquers All"	July 19, 2014
25	7	"Rude Awakening"	July 26, 2014
26	8	"Long Arm of the Dog"	August 2, 2014
27	9	"Desert Justice"	August 9, 2014
28	10	"Big Easy Bounty"	August 16, 2014
29	11	"Jambalaya Justice"	August 23, 2014
30	12	"Music City Mayhem"	August 30, 2014
31	13	"There's Something About Mary Ellen"	September 6, 2014
32	14	"Rocky Mountain Menace"	September 13, 2014
33	15	"Family Fugitive"	September 20, 2014
34	16	"Birthday Special: Part One"	September 27, 2014
35	17	"Birthday Special: Part Two"	October 4, 2014

=== Season 3 (2015) ===
No. overall	No. in season	Title	Original release date
36	1	"Return to the 'Aina"	July 18, 2015
37	2	"Cecily Steps Up"	July 18, 2015
38	3	"Road to Redemption Part 1"	July 25, 2015
39	4	"Road to Redemption Part 2"	July 25, 2015
40	5	"Lester's Last Stand"	August 1, 2015
41	6	"The United States of Texas"	August 1, 2015
42	7	"Houston, We Have A Problem"	August 8, 2015
43	8	"The Houston Solution"	August 8, 2015
44	9	"The Dark Night"	August 15, 2015
45	10	"The Dark Night Returns"	August 15, 2015
46	11	"Catch You On My Way Out Of Town"	August 22, 2015
47	12	"Old Friends, New Beginnings"	August 22, 2015
