= Beth Chapman =

American reality television star (1967–2019)

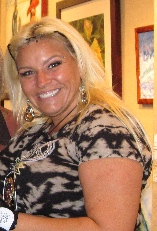
- Chapman in 2010
- Born: Alice Elizabeth Smith; October 29, 1967; Denver, Colorado, U.S.
- Died: June 26, 2019 (aged 51); Honolulu, Hawaii, U.S.
- Occupations: Bounty hunter, reality TV star
- Years active: 2004–2019
- Notable work: Dog the Bounty Hunter; Dog and Beth: On the Hunt; Dog's Most Wanted
- Spouses: Keith Alan Barmore (m. 1991; div. 1993) Duane Chapman (m. 2006)
- Children: 4

Alice Elizabeth Chapman (née Smith; October 29, 1967 – June 26, 2019) was an American bounty hunter and reality star who co-starred with her husband, Duane "Dog" Chapman, on the reality television shows Dog the Bounty Hunter, Dog and Beth: On the Hunt, and Dog's Most Wanted.

== Personal life ==
Chapman was born in Denver, Colorado, one of five children born to Garry Leon Smith (1937 – 2006) and Bonnie Joan Lawson (1940 – 2022). In a Mother's Day address delivered at a church in an episode of Dog's Most Wanted, she claimed to have been raised as a Mennonite.

Chapman spent the majority of her early life in Colorado before moving to Honolulu to be with Duane Chapman, whom she married in 2006 after years of an on-again-off-again relationship. They had two children together, Bonnie Joanne Chapman (born December 16, 1998) and Garry Chapman (February 7, 2001). Chapman adopted Beth's daughter from her previous marriage, Cecily Barmore-Chapman (née Barmore; born June 19, 1993). Chapman was also able to help Beth locate and reconcile with her son Dominic Davis (born 1985), born when she was a teenager at 17 years old and subsequently placed for adoption.

Chapman was a Christian.

== Career ==
Beth and Duane Chapman operated Da'Kine Bail Bonds together.

Chapman starred in reality television shows alongside her husband Duane Chapman, most notably Dog the Bounty Hunter which originally was released in late 2004 and lasted 8 seasons until 2012. Chapman's final series was Dog's Most Wanted which was being filmed in 2019; she died while the show was being produced. Dog's Most Wanted features Beth getting the news of her terminal cancer and her fight with it over time before her death. The final episode is dedicated to her memory.

== Illness and death ==
Beth Chapman was diagnosed with stage two throat cancer in September 2017, which initially went into remission; however, the disease later spread to her lungs. In early 2019, Chapman began filming their new show, Dog's Most Wanted, and on June 22, during production, she was hospitalized and placed in a medically induced coma at The Queen's Medical Center in Honolulu, where she later died from complications from the illness on June 26. According to her death certificate, her ashes were scattered at sea. This event was shown in the final episode of Dog's Most Wanted, along with footage from her memorial services in Hawaii and Colorado.
