= Andrew Luster =

American rapist (born 1963)

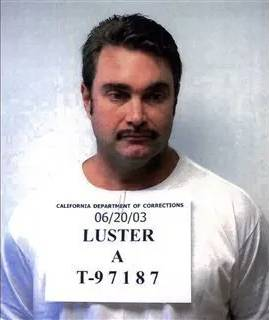
- Mug shot of Luster in 2003
- Born: Andrew Stuart Luster; December 15, 1963 (age 62); Las Vegas, Nevada, U.S.
- Children: 2
- Relatives: Max Factor Sr. (great-grandfather)
- Status: Released, on parole
- Convictions: January 22, 2003 (in absentia; captured June 18, 2003)
- Criminal charges: Rape, sodomy, oral copulation, unlawful flight to avoid prosecution
- Penalty: 50 years (before appeal, 124 years), $1 million fine

Andrew Stuart Luster (born December 15, 1963) is an American convicted sex offender and the heir to the Max Factor cosmetics fortune. He is the great-grandson of cosmetics giant Max Factor Sr. In 2003, he was convicted of multiple sexual assaults using the date-rape drug GHB.

== Early life ==
Andrew Luster is the son of Henry Luster, a psychiatrist, and Elizabeth Luster (née Shore). His mother was the adopted daughter of Max Factor Sr.'s daughter Freda. He grew up in Malibu, California, and attended Windward School in Los Angeles.

After graduating, Luster moved to Mussel Shoals, California, living on a $1 million trust fund and living in a $600,000 cottage on the beach. According to the Los Angeles Times, this move and Luster's "freewheeling lifestyle" weakened his "already tenuous" ties to the Factor family, which was heavily involved in the arts and philanthropy.

== Sexual assault charges and conviction ==
In 2000, Luster was arrested when a student at a local college told police that she had been raped at Luster's home. Upon investigation, police charged Luster with drugging three women with the date-rape drug GHB, sexually assaulting them, and video-taping the assaults, having found videotapes of the assaults when they searched his home. After paying $1 million bail, Luster failed to appear in court to defend himself against the charges in January 2003. Luster was convicted in absentia and sentenced to 124 years in prison.

Luster's legal case earned major attention due to his family's wealth, and in January 2003, the FBI issued a warrant for unlawful flight to avoid prosecution. In June 2003, he was captured by American bounty hunter Duane "Dog" Chapman in Puerto Vallarta, Mexico. Both Luster and Chapman were subsequently arrested by Mexican police. Luster was handed over to American authorities. Chapman's felony kidnapping charge was reduced to a misdemeanor, and he fled Mexico when he was released on bail. Chapman later wrote that he believed his actions in Mexico were legal due to working closely with a Mexican police officer while in that nation, but the American judge in Luster's case refused to grant Chapman any reward or bond. Chapman also explained that during his pursuit of Luster, he consulted with "a forensic expert who specialized in sex crimes" who believed Luster's preference for raping unconscious, passive victims indicated a necrophile tendency that might lead to murder.

The California Court of Appeal refused Luster's appeal, citing that Luster had been a fugitive. Longstanding precedent holds that fugitives flout the court's authority, and thus forfeit their right to appeal. The California Supreme Court and the United States Supreme Court later refused to overturn this ruling.

== Prison sentence and civil suits ==
Luster was incarcerated at Valley State Prison in Chowchilla, California.

In late 2009, Luster filed a petition for habeas corpus as the final possibility of having his case reviewed by another court on appeal. Luster was represented in that suit by Jay Leiderman and J. David Nick. The habeas corpus petition was granted in April 2012. On March 11, 2013, the Ventura County Superior Court vacated Luster's 124-year sentence but not his conviction, based on the trial judge's failure to state specific reasons for imposing consecutive sentences, and ordered a new sentencing hearing April 4, 2013.

On April 16, 2013, Ventura County Superior Court Judge Kathryne Stoltz reduced Luster's sentence to 50 years—48 years for the rapes and two years for the drug-related charges. Luster's lawyers indicated there will be an appeal.

In 2016, opponents of California Proposition 57 released a brochure that stated that Luster could be released early due to the lack of clarity for what defines "violent crimes." In response to this brochure, California Governor Jerry Brown told Fresno County sheriff Margaret Mims that Luster was originally sentenced to 100 years in prison and was a registered sex offender, "and on both accounts would not be getting out." Brown's administration later clarified that since Luster would have to register as a sex offender, he would not be eligible for parole even if Proposition 57 passed.

Two of the victims won civil lawsuits against Luster, who was ordered to pay a total of $40 million. Luster subsequently sold most of his property and declared bankruptcy.

Luster was released on parole on October 11, 2026, and he now resides in Glendora, California.

== Media portrayals ==
After Luster fled the United States, a movie based on his crimes, A Date with Darkness: The Trial and Capture of Andrew Luster was produced with the intention of aiding in his capture by ending with a photo of him, and a request for witnesses to his whereabouts to notify authorities. Because the film was in production when Luster was captured, the ending was re-written to incorporate his capture.

On August 28, 2009, the true crime TV series Dominick Dunne's Power, Privilege, and Justice aired an episode on the case in Season 3, Episode 4, "Evil Deeds".

On August 31, 2017, Investigation Discovery aired the first episode of Guilty Rich, which recounted the story of Andrew Luster's crimes, arrest, flight, and ultimate conviction and incarceration.

The case was also profiled in the sixth episode of the 15th season of Evil Lives Here.

Luster's crimes and subsequent trial were featured in a true crime story written by James Patterson with Max Dilallo titled "Murder of Innocence" published by Grand Central Publishing in 2020.
