= Max Factor =

Line of cosmetics

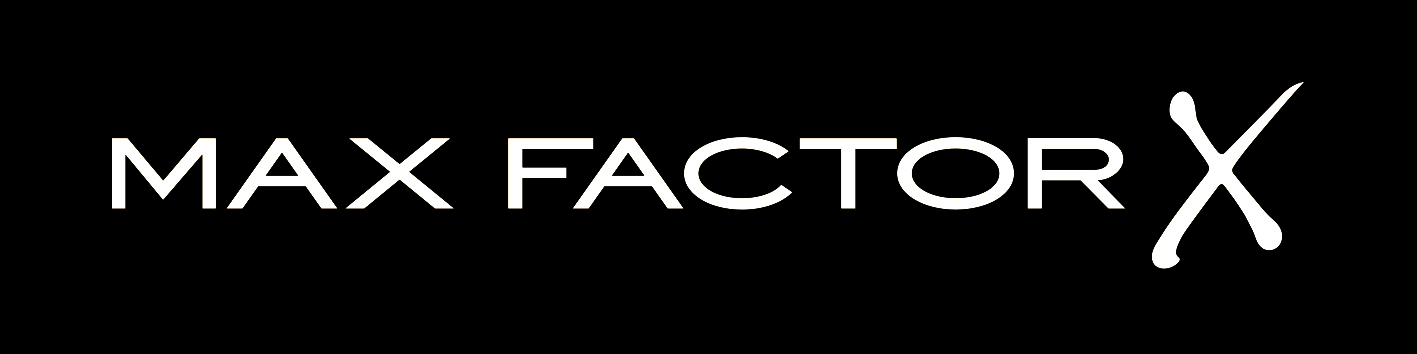
- Type: Private
- Industry: Cosmetic
- Founded: 1909; 117 years ago
- Founder: Maksymilian Faktorowicz
- Area served: Worldwide
- Products: Cosmetics
- Owner: Coty
- Website: maxfactor.com

Max Factor is a line of cosmetics from Coty, founded in 1909 as Max Factor & Company by Maksymilian Faktorowicz.

Max Factor specialized in movie make-up. Until its 1973 sale for US$500 million (approximately $3.8 billion in 2017 dollars), Max Factor & Company was owned by several generations of the family, becoming an international company during that time. Procter & Gamble purchased it in 1991.

== History ==
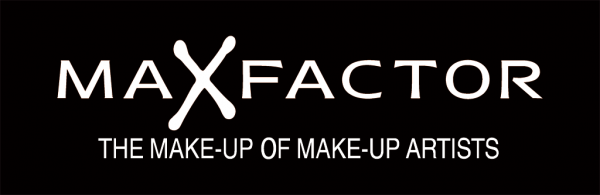
Former logo used until 2013/2014

Max Factor was born Maksymilian Faktorowicz into a Jewish-Polish family in Congress Poland under the Russian Empire.

By the age of eight years, Factor was working as an assistant to a dentist and pharmacist. At the age of nine, he was apprenticed to a wig maker and cosmetician in Łódź.

Later, he opened his own shop in the town of Ryazan, selling hand-made rouges, creams, fragrances, and wigs. He became well known when a traveling theatrical troupe wore Factor's cosmetics to perform for Russian nobility. The Russian nobility appointed Factor the official cosmetics expert for the royal family and the Imperial Russian Grand Opera. By 1904, concerned about the increasing anti-Jewish persecution developing in the Russian Empire, he and his wife decided to move to America.

After emigrating to the United States in 1904, Factor moved his family and business to Los Angeles, seeing an opportunity to provide made-to-order wigs and theatrical make-up to the growing film industry. Besides selling his own make-up products, he soon became the West Coast distributor of both Leichner and Minor, two leading theatrical make-up manufacturers.

When the film industry was beginning to evolve, stick greasepaint, which was the accepted make-up for stage use, could not be applied thin enough, nor did the colors work satisfactorily, for the screen. Factor began experimenting with various compounds to develop a suitable make-up for the new film medium. By 1914 he had perfected his first cosmetic product, a "flexible greasepaint," on that basis becoming the authority on cosmetics in film-making.

For his first few years in the business, Factor personally applied his products to actors and actresses. He developed a reputation for customizing makeup to present film stars, notably Mabel Normand, Ben Turpin, Gloria Swanson, Mary Pickford, Pola Negri, Jean Harlow, Claudette Colbert, Bette Davis, Norma Shearer, Joan Crawford, Lucille Ball and Judy Garland, in the best light onscreen.

In 1918, Factor introduced his "Color Harmony" face powder, which, with its wide range of shades, allowed him consistent custom make-up for each actor. He created many unique looks for notable actresses, such as Clara Bow's heart-shaped/pierrot lips. Years later, he exaggerated Joan Crawford's naturally full lips to distinguish her from the many would-be stars copying the Clara Bow look. He also created specific shades: Platinum (Jean Harlow), Special Medium (Joan Crawford), Dark (Claudette Colbert) and Light Egyptian (Lena Horne). For Rudolph Valentino, his make-up complemented the actor's complexion and masked the darkness of his skin on screen.

In 1920, Factor accepted his son Frank's suggestion and officially began calling his products as "make-up," from the verb phrase "to make up" (one's face). Until then he had called them "cosmetics"; "make-up" was used by theater people and the disreputable, not in polite society.

In 1922, while on holiday in Europe with his wife, Factor visited the Leichner headquarters in Germany. He was by then the biggest retailer of their theatrical stick greasepaint, yet was snubbed and kept waiting at reception. Upset at this treatment, he left and immediately cabled his sons to begin selling his own brand of greasepaint. Until then, Factor had made his own greasepaint for use on his clients but had made no attempt to market it while he was representing other brands. Now he concentrated on his own products, which he offered in a collapsible tube instead of in stick form. His tube greasepaint not only was more hygienic than the stick form but could be applied thinly and evenly. Soon it was the leading brand.

By the 1920s, his sons Davis and Frank were heavily involved in the business, with Davis the general manager and Frank assisting his father in the development of new products. In 1925, the company received its biggest order to date when it had to complete a rush order to supply 600 gallons of light olive makeup for the movie Ben-Hur to ensure the skin color of the extras used in filming undertaken in America would match that of the darker-skinned Italian extras in the scenes filmed in Italy. For the 1926 film Mare Nostrum, Max and Frank Factor developed the first waterproof theatrical make-up.

By the 1920s, the Max Factor name was becoming known outside the film community, which led to the company developing an in-house PR department in the early 1930s. In 1935, Max Factor opened the Max Factor Salon, which was frequented by virtually all of Classic Hollywood's greatest starlets.

=== National distribution ===
While Max Factor was satisfied to remain a specialized supplier of products to the film community, his children were convinced they could grow the company into a much larger enterprise. National distribution began in 1927 when Sales Builders, an established distribution company, obtained the rights to advertise, distribute and sell Factor's products. Due to his strong connection with the film industry, Max Factor was able to use celebrity endorsements in advertising. In return for a nominal payment of US$1 to the actor, the advertising would also promote the star's latest film.

=== Development of Panchromatic ===
The introduction of sound-on-film led to the replacement of the old noisy carbon arc lights by tungsten lights, which were less hot and created a softer light. At the same time the orthochromatic film, which until that time had been used by the industry, was replaced by super-sensitive faster Panchromatic film which noticeably darkened skin colors. These developments required six months of intensive development to create make-up compatible with the new environment. Because they had been designed for black and white film the existing products were unsuitable for everyday use. This new Panchromatic make-up was trademarked in October 1929.

=== Development of Pan-Cake ===
The development of Technicolor film required the company to develop a new line of products as its existing Panchromatic make-up left a slight sheen on the skin which reflected surrounding colors. As a result of how bad they looked in color many actors and actresses refused to appear in color films. Because Max Factor was recovering from being hit by a delivery van at the time, Frank Factor took the lead in the two years it took to develop a suitable make-up, initially called the "T-D" and then renamed the "Pan-Cake" series. It was sold in a solid cake form and applied with a damp sponge which offered the advantage of concealing skin imperfections under a transparent matte finish. Its first appearance was in the film Vogues of 1938. The Pan-Cake make-up was made for on-screen looks but was wearable for day-to-day looks.

It was an immediate hit and its advantages led to women stealing it from the film sets and using it privately. Its only disadvantage for everyday use was that it could not be used at night as it made the skin too dark under all but the powerful lights used in film studios. While Max Factor wanted to reserve the product for film use, Frank Factor was open to the commercial possibilities and began developing lighter shades. At the time the company was only able to produce enough to meet studio demand, which delayed commercial release until production could be increased. The company used the release of Vogues of 1938 in August 1937 and five months later The Goldwyn Follies, the second film to use the make-up, to commercially release Pan-Cake to the public, backed by a color-based national advertising campaign. It immediately became the fastest and largest selling single make-up item to date, as well as the standard make-up used in all Technicolor films.

=== Beauty micrometer ===
In the 1930s, Factor helped to develop a mask-like device to measure the contours of subjects' faces. He called it the "Beauty Micrometer". Its purpose was to detect even barely visible structural flaws, that might be magnified and more-noticeable on camera. A technician could then apply makeup to mask the problem.

=== Max Factor's death ===
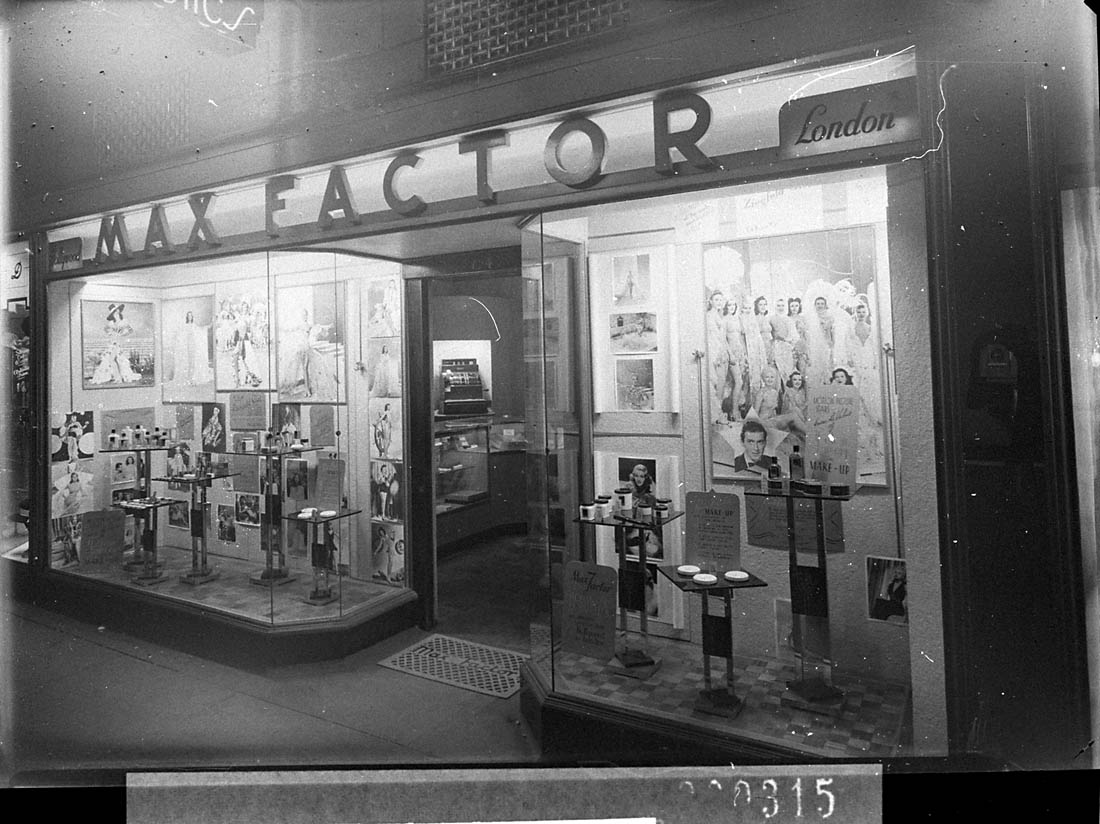
Max Factor cosmetics storefront in Sydney, 1941

After Max Factor's death in 1938, Frank Factor took the name Max Factor, Jr., and expanded the still private cosmetics firm, along with members of the immediate family including Sidney Factor, Louis Factor, Davis Factor and Max Firestein.

In 1939 Max Factor, Jr., began development of a smear-proof lipstick which would also both be non-irritating and not change color. A kissing machine was constructed to test the formula's resistance to fading. The result was released in 1940 as "Tru-Color" in six shades of red.

During World War II, Max Factor developed make-up shades for use by the US Marine Corps in camouflaging faces.

In 1947 after 26 months of development by Max Factor, Jr., the company released "Pan-Stik", a cream make-up supplied in stick form and designed to take advantage of the latest changes in studio lighting and film stock. This product was quick to apply as well as non-greasy. It was released to the public in 1948 and was immediately commercially successful.

In 1951 the company expanded their range to offer a range of male shampoo, aftershave lotion, deodorant and shaving foams.

The introduction of color television lead the company to develop Max Factor Color TV Make-up, which became the standard for use in color television.

In 1955 the company released "Electrique", its first fragrance and three years later "Primitif".

In 1956 Max Factor inc. purchased Sales Builders, which had until that time handled all of their national sales and distribution. This led to a complete reorganization of the company's American markets, advertising, sales and distribution division.

By the 1960s, Max Factor, Jr., Max Firestein, and grandsons Donald Factor, Alfred Jay Firestein and Chester Lee Firestein were still involved. Under his leadership, in 1965 Max Factor, Jr., established "Geminesse", a line of makeup, skincare and perfume products that were sold only by uniformed clerks in department stores. The packaging and products were different; many of the containers were designed to resemble Greek sculptures.

The early 1960s saw the company become a public company and list its Class A stock on the New York Stock Exchange. This period also saw the third generation of the Factor family, Barbara Factor, Davis Jr. Factor, Donald Factor, Alfred Firestein, and Chester Firestein rising to senior positions within the company. His place of work is now a museum located in downtown Hollywood.

=== Merger with Norton Simon ===
By the early 1970s Sidney Factor had retired from the board, and Barbara Factor, Donald Factor and Davis Jr. Factor from the third generation had also left the company to pursue other interests. As a result, there was decreasing family involvement. Davis Factor was still board chairman while Alfred Jay Firestein was president and CEO when in 1973 the company agreed to merge with Norton Simon. This event was marred weeks later by the sudden death of Alfred Jay Firestein at the age of 48. Chester Firestein succeeded him as president of the company, only to resign three years later in 1976, to devote his time to his personal interests; he was replaced by a non-family member. His departure, together with that of Max Factor, Jr., in the same year, meant that there were now no members of Max Factor's immediate family working for the company.

During Chester Firestein's time in charge the company expanded overseas and launched many new products including Musk For Men, UltaLucent Waterproof make-up and, in 1975, the successful Halston fragrance, which quickly became the second best-selling designer fragrance in the world, trailing Chanel No. 5.

It was under Norton Simon that Max Factor launched "Maxi", a line of makeup aimed at a younger, more savvy consumer. Maxi sold products aimed at adolescent tastes, such as lip gloss, color rubs and "mood" lipsticks. Maxi was priced to compete with market leaders Bonne Bell and CoverGirl. Neither Maxi, Geminesse, nor Max Factor were able to lift the company's declining profits and market share.

In 1983 Norton Simon was taken over by Esmark, by which time no one in the Factor family was involved in the company's day-to-day operations. A year later Esmark merged with Beatrice Foods, which lumped Max Factor into their Playtex beauty division and moved the Max Factor headquarters from Los Angeles to Stamford, Connecticut. In 1986, Ronald Perelman of Revlon bought the Playtex beauty division for $500 million. In 1991, Revlon sold Max Factor to Procter & Gamble for $1.5 billion.

By the first quarter of 2010, Procter & Gamble had discontinued Max Factor in the United States, instead focusing its marketing efforts on the more successful CoverGirl cosmetics line. Max Factor continued to be marketed overseas.

In June, 2015, Max Factor was one of a number of beauty brands purchased from P&G by Coty for $12 billion. Coty relaunched Max Factor in 2018.

== Innovations ==
Max Factor is credited with many cosmetic innovations, among which are:

- 1914: Released the first cosmetic made specifically for motion pictures, a thinner greasepaint made in 12 shades. It was in cream form and packaged in jars, as opposed to the thicker stick grease paints used for theater.
- 1917: Released "Supreme Liquid Whitener" which provided the means of obtaining an alabaster smoothness on the neck, shoulder, arms and hands.
- 1918: Released "Color Harmony", a range of face powder which due to its wide range of shades allowed the customizing of consistent make-up for an individual actor or actress.
- 1925: Released "Max Factor's Supreme Nail Polish," a metal pot of beige-colored powder that was sprinkled on the nails and buffed with a chamois buffer, to give nails shine and some tint.
- 1927: Released "Society Nail Tint," a small porcelain pot containing rose colored cream. Applied to the nail and buffed, it gave a natural rose color. "Society Nail White" was also released. This was a tube of chalky white liquid that was applied under nail tips and left to dry. The result resembled the modern French manicure.
- 1928: Developed cosmetics specifically for use in black-and-white films. Max Sr. was awarded an Oscar award for this innovation.
- 1930: Invented lip gloss.
- 1932: Developed a line of "Television Make-up," specifically to meet the needs of television.
- 1934: Released Liquid Nail Enamel, forerunner of today's nail polishes.
- 1935: Opened the Max Factor Make-up Salon in Los Angeles.
- 1935: Released "Pan-Cake", forerunner of modern cake makeup, originally developed for color films.
- 1940: Released "Tru-Color" lipstick, the first smear-proof lipstick. Created the "Hunter's Bow" shape that is popular among the pin-up.
- 1948: Released "Pan-Stik" makeup.
- 1954: Released "Erace", the original concealer, and developed a line of cosmetics specifically for color television's needs. (This line remained the standard for TV cosmetics until the arrival of HDTV.)
- 1971: Released the first "waterproof" make-up.
- 1980: Japanese subsidiary acquired an antioxidant derived from sake wine, called Pitera. Subsequently, launched Max Factor Secret Key with Pitera, which would later be renamed SK-II.
- 1988: Launched the world's first clear colorless mascara
- 2000: Launched the first 12-hour long-lasting non-transfer lip color, "Lipfinity" lipstick
- 2008: Launched "False Lash Effect mascara"
