= Hollywood Museum =

Film and television history museum

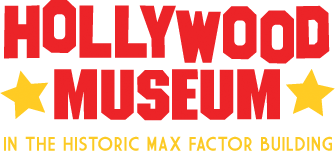

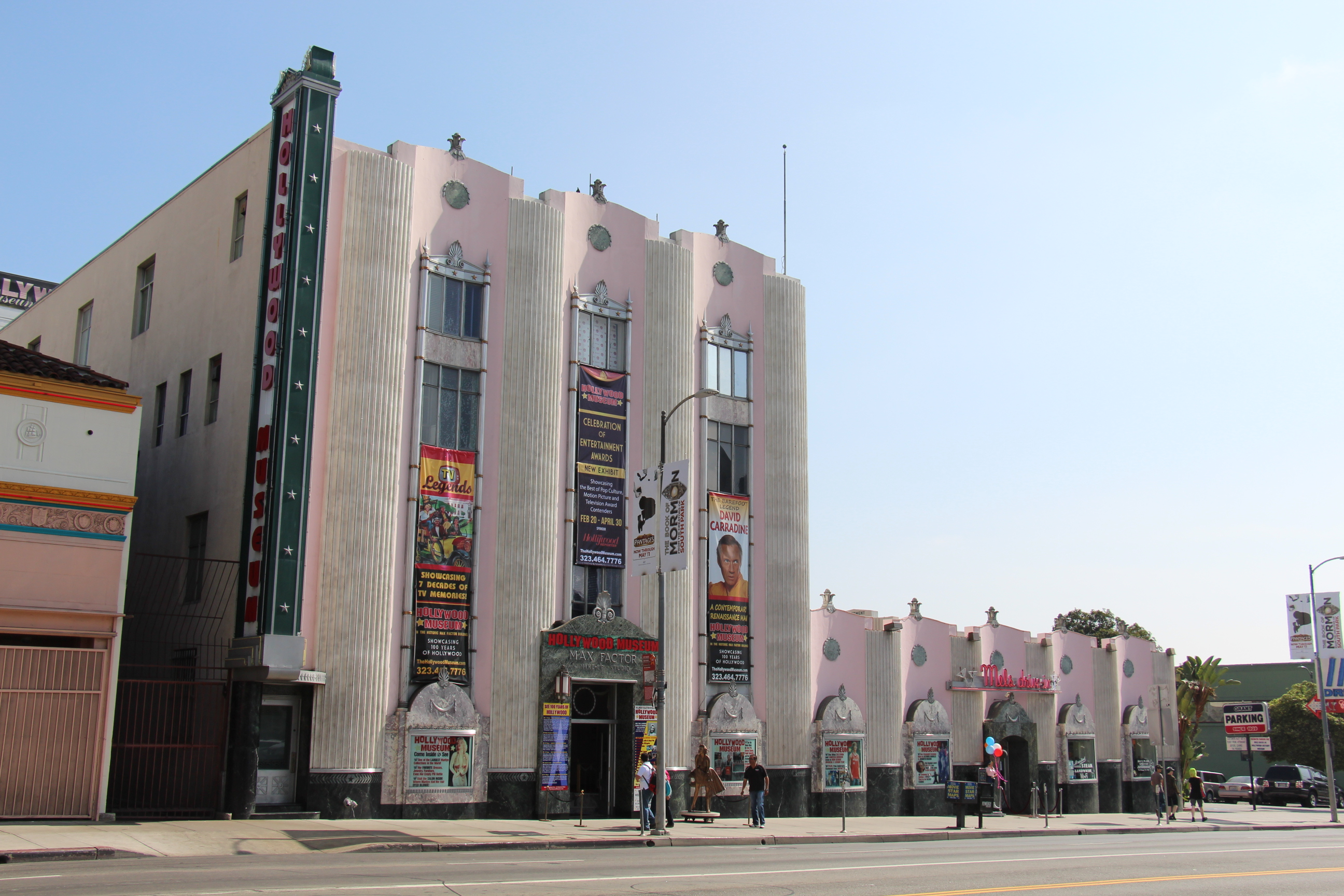
- The Hollywood Museum in the Max Factor Building
- Location: 1660 North Highland Avenue; Hollywood, California; 90028
- Coordinates: 34°06′04″N 118°20′18″W
- Founder: Donelle Dadigan
- President: Donelle Dadigan
- Curator: Steve Nycklemoe
- Website: thehollywoodmuseum.com

The Hollywood Museum is a museum located at North Highland Avenue in the Hollywood neighborhood of Los Angeles, California, United States, houses a collection of memorabilia from the history of American motion pictures and television. It is housed in the historic Max Factor Salon on Highland Avenue designed by American architect Simeon Charles Lee.

The collection of the Hollywood Museum contains over 11,000 items, including costumes, props, stop motion figures, photographs, scripts, and other artifacts. Among the exhibits are the original four makeup rooms used by pioneering Hollywood makeup artist Max Factor—one for redheads, one for blondes, one for brownettes, and one for brunettes.

The museum is connected to a branch of Mel's Drive-In restaurant.

== History ==
The building that houses the museum was initially purchased in 1928 by legendary make-up artist to the stars Max Factor. The building was sold to the Hollywood Museum in 1994. After nine years of renovations, the museum opened to the public in 2003.

In June 2016, during LGBT Pride Month, the museum hosted an exhibition called "Reel to Real: Portrayals and Perceptions of Gays in Hollywood".

The museum was closed for 17 months in 2020 and 2021 due to the COVID-19 pandemic in California. It reopened in August 2021.

== Gallery ==
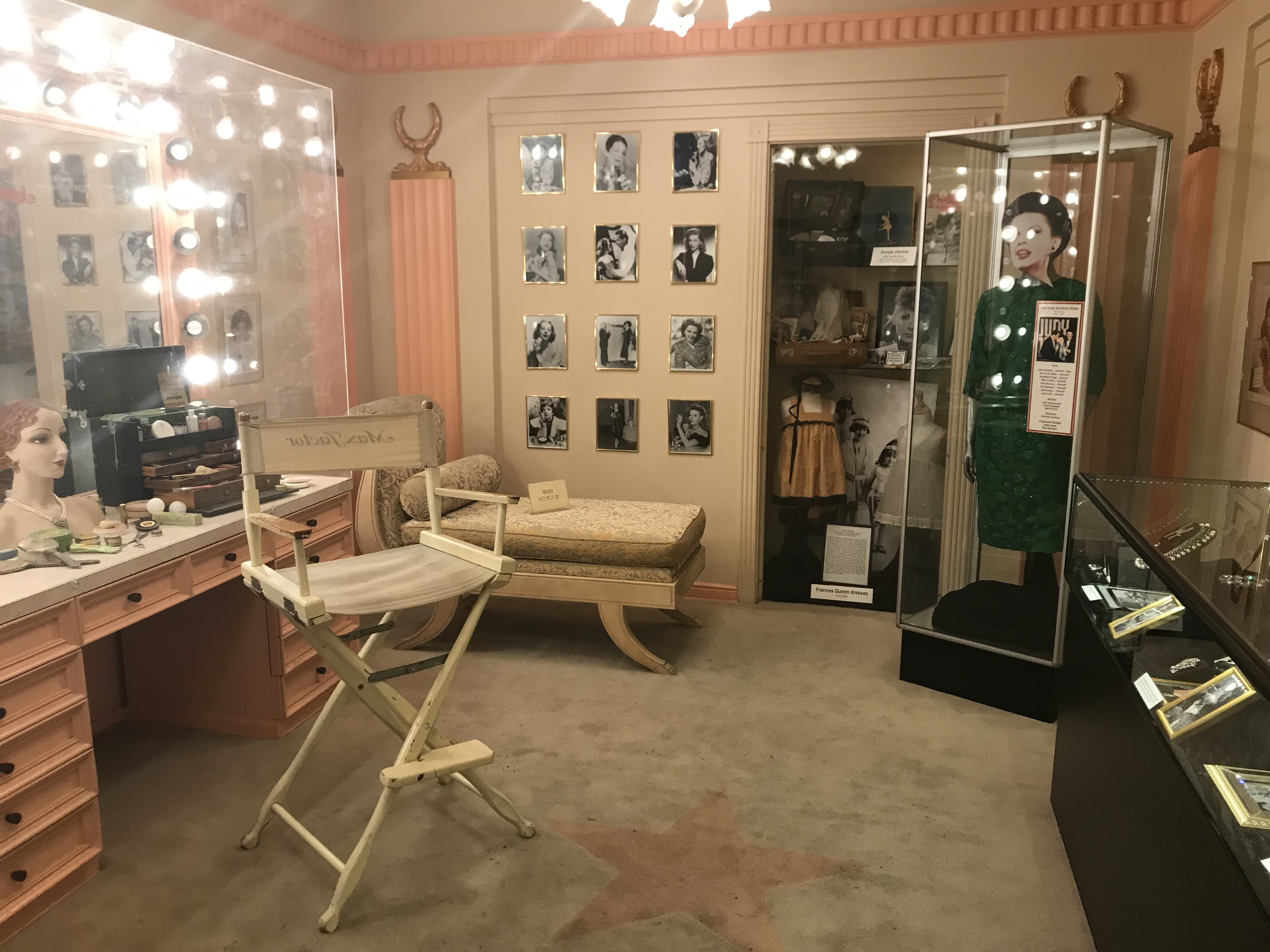
One of the many display rooms in the museum, once used for glamour when the museum was the Max Factor Salon.

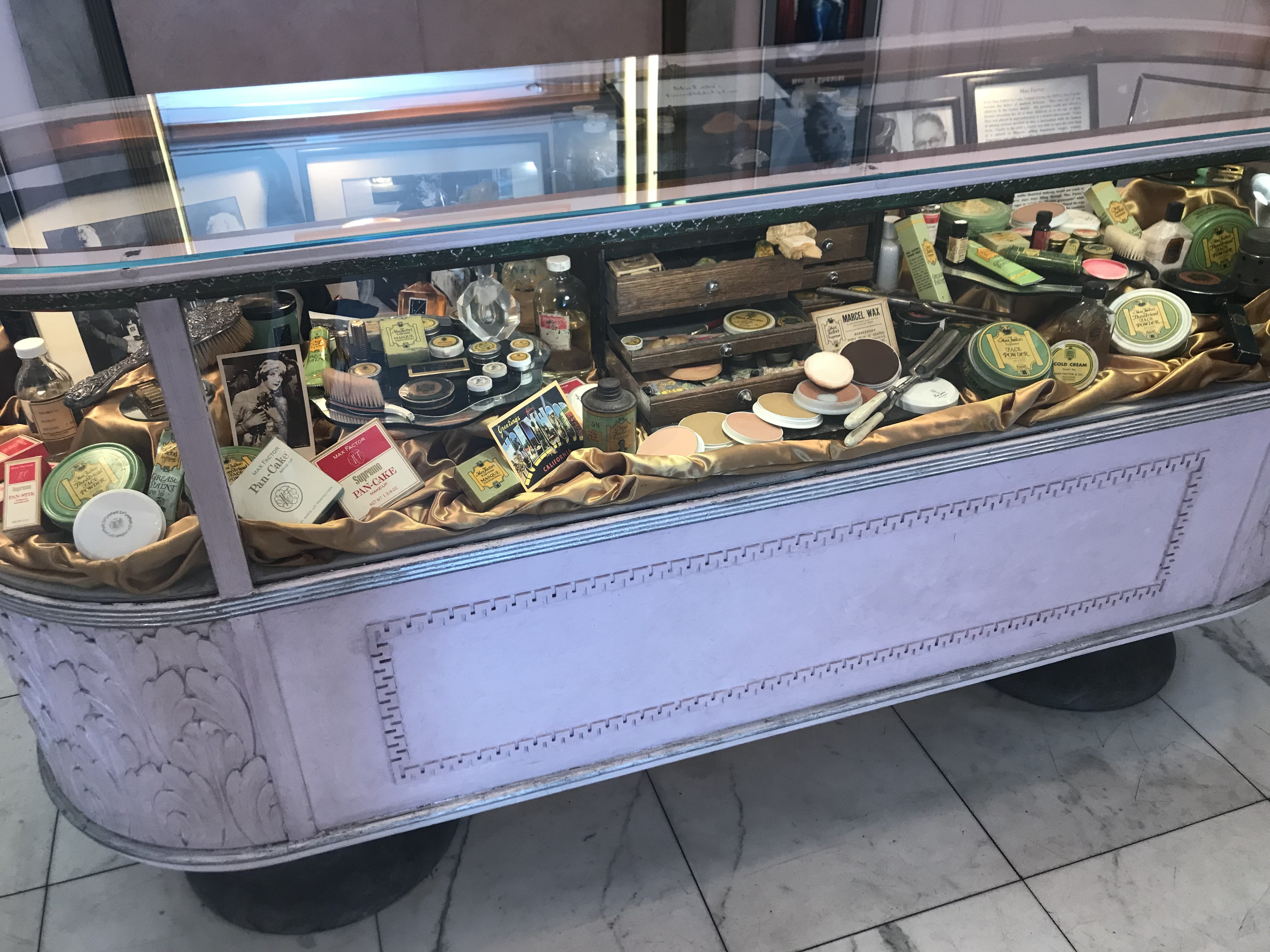
Vintage Max Factor products on display.

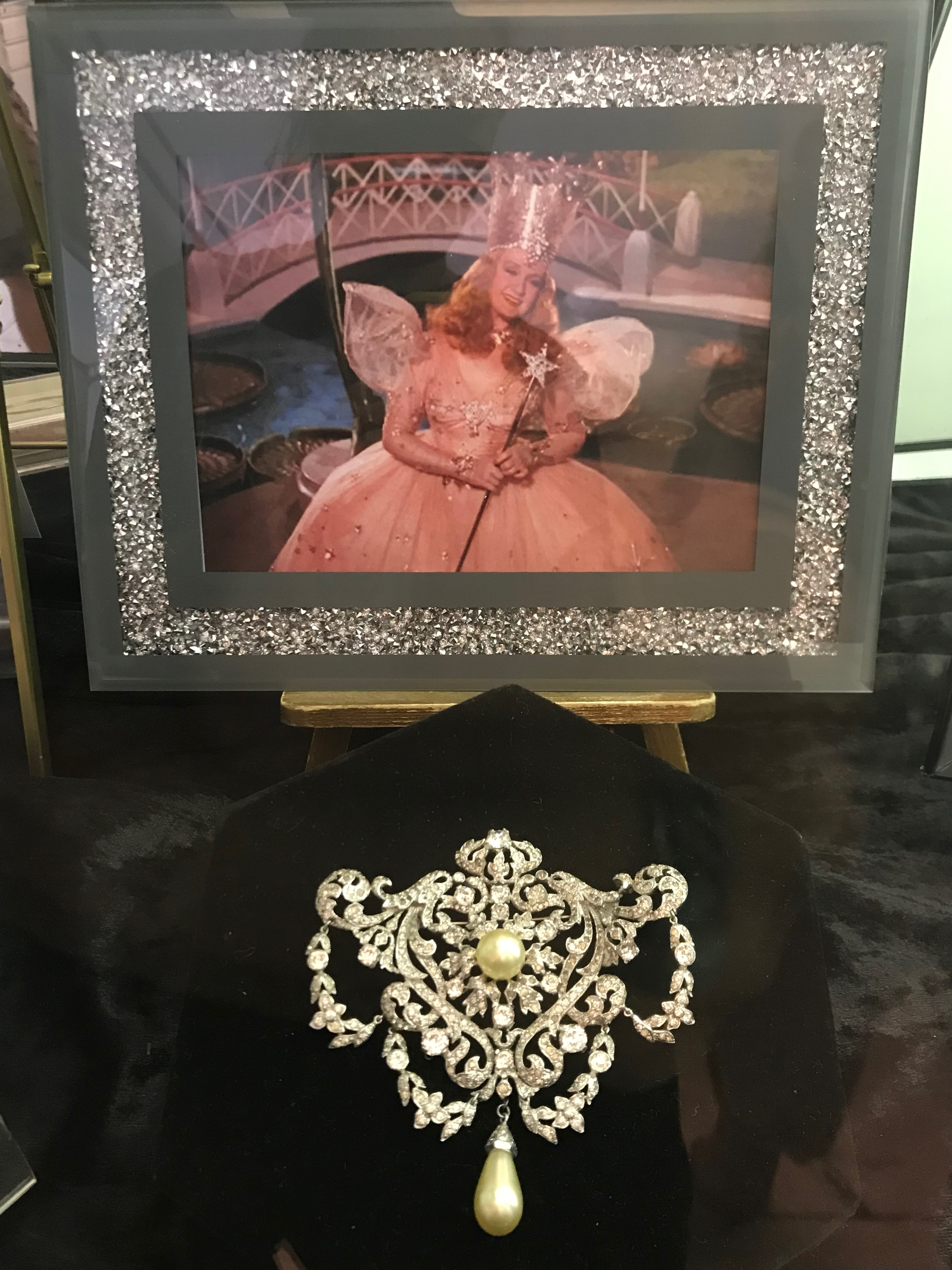
Ornament from Glinda's crown.

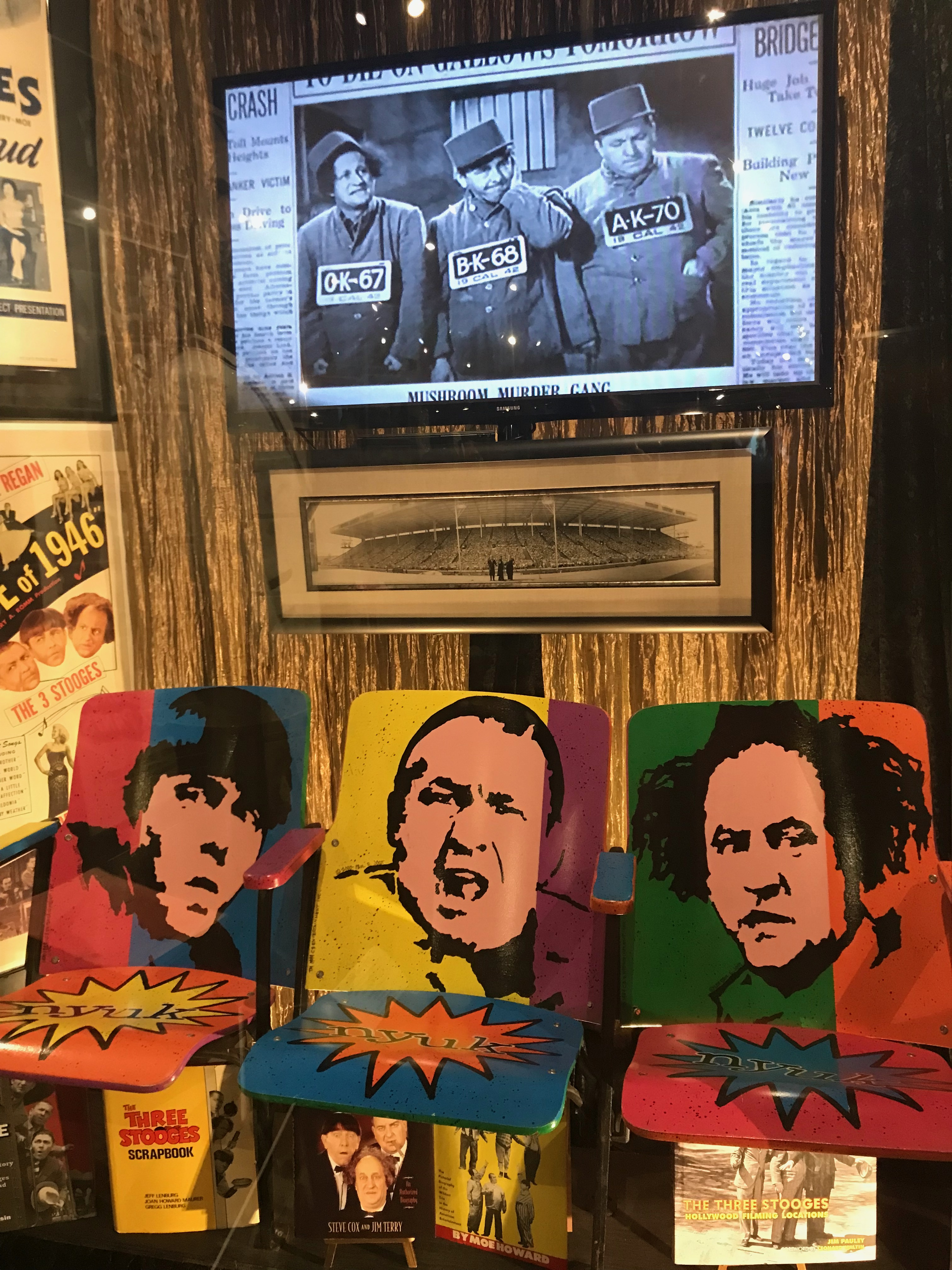
Memorabilia from The Three Stooges 100th anniversary exhibit.

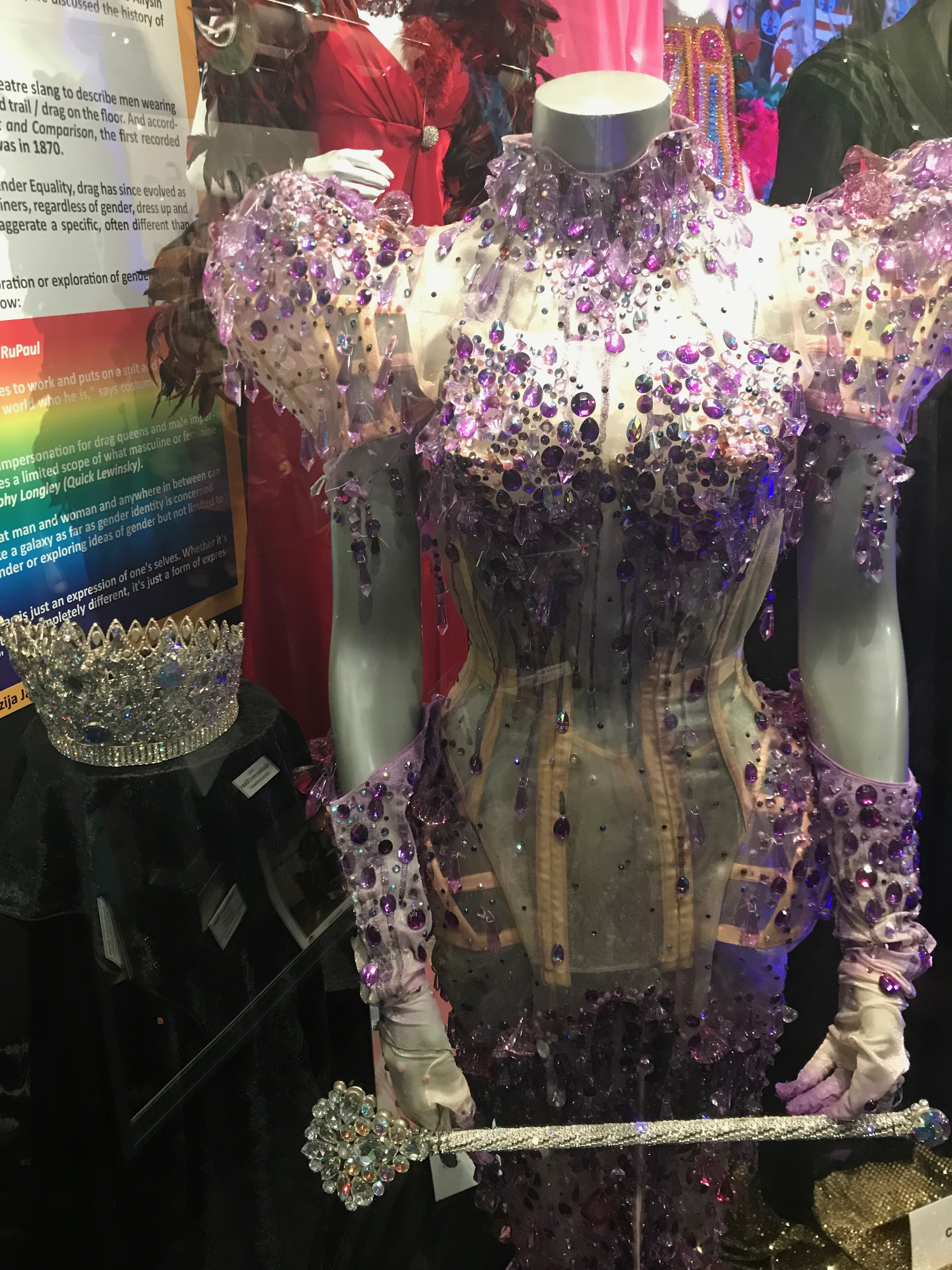
Costume from Ru Paul's Drag Race for the museum's Reel to Real: Portrayals and Perceptions of LGBT in Hollywood exhibit.

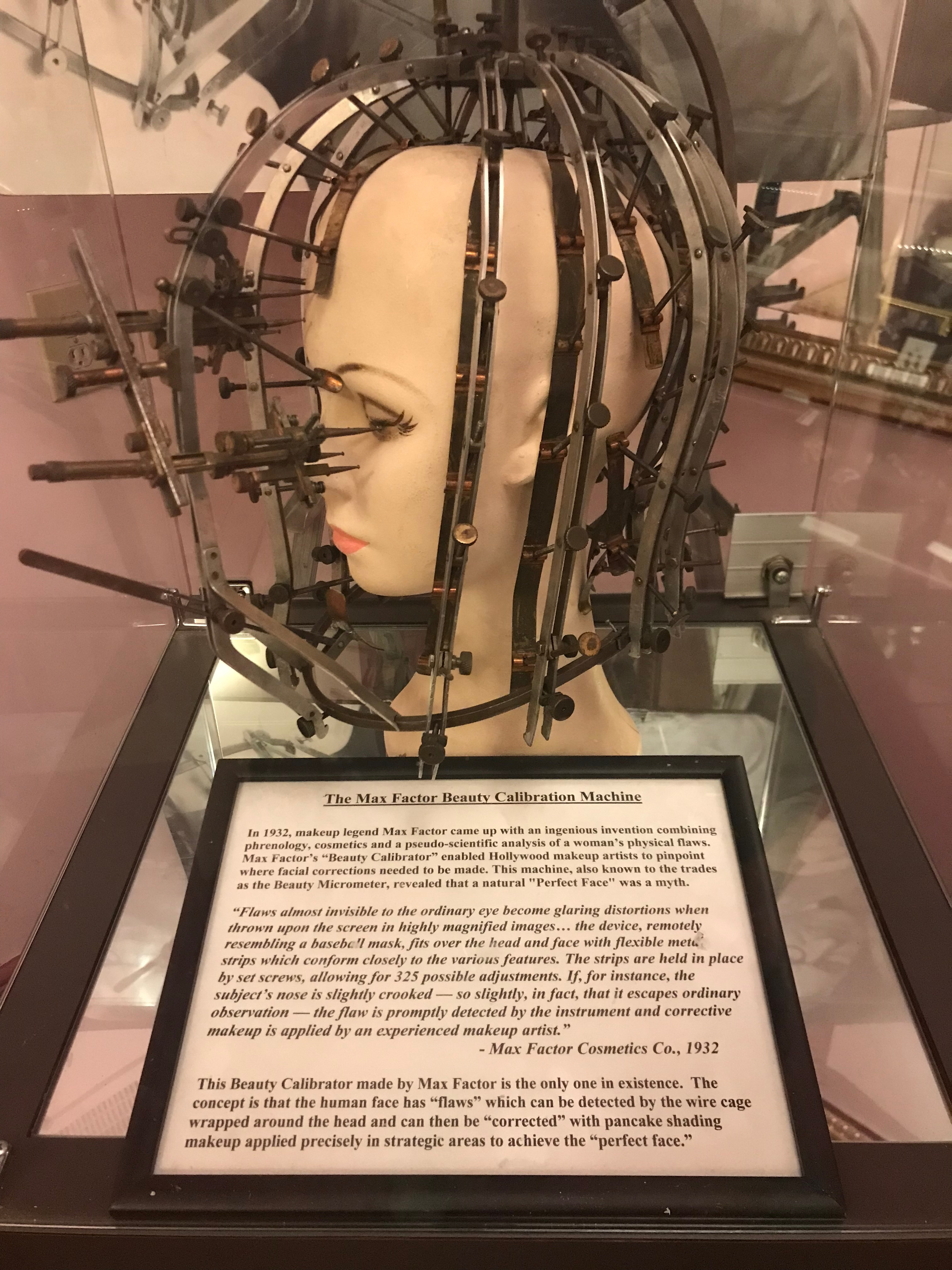
An antiquated facial proportion-measuring contraption on display.

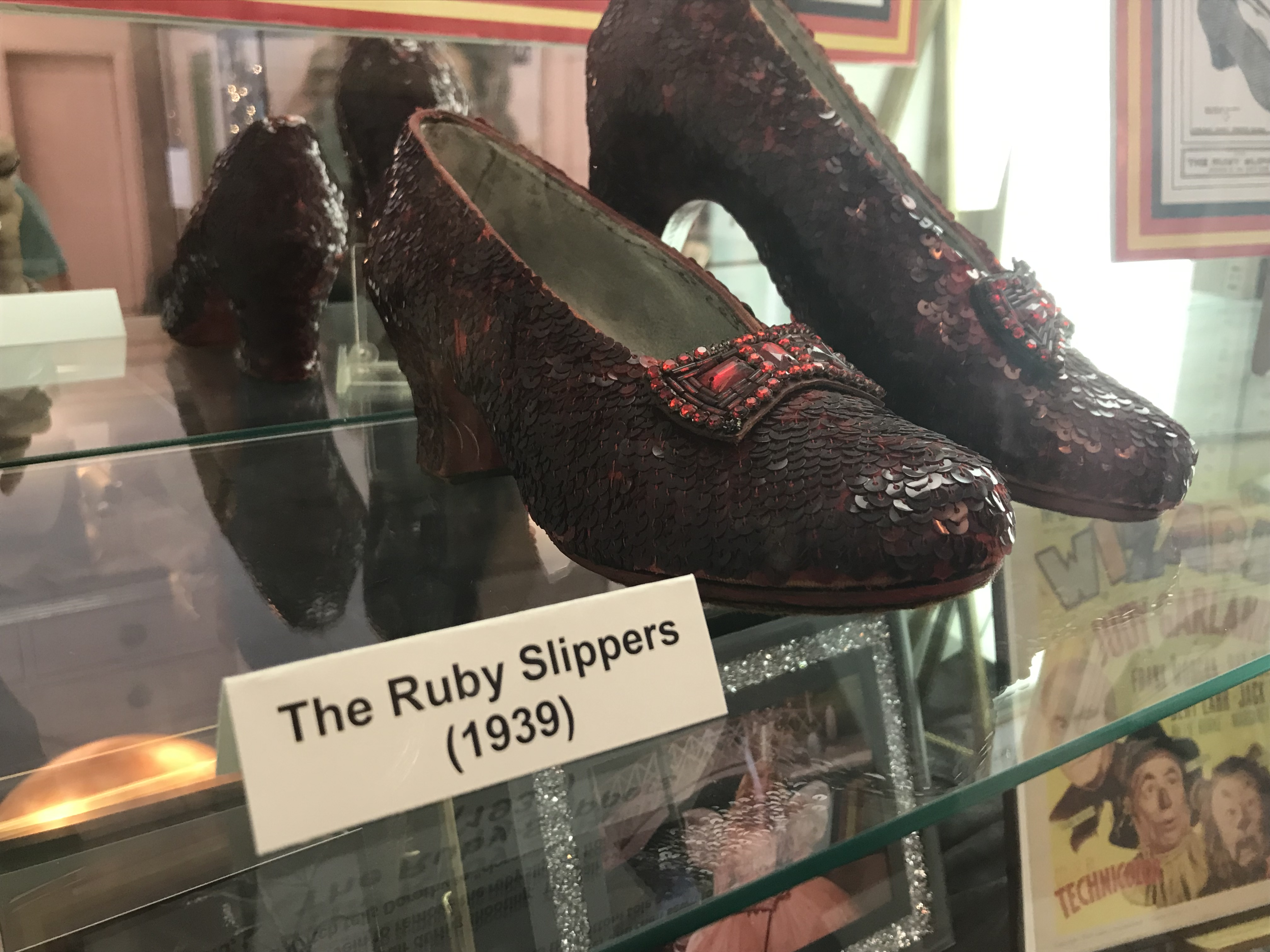
A pair of the ruby slippers used in The Wizard of Oz.

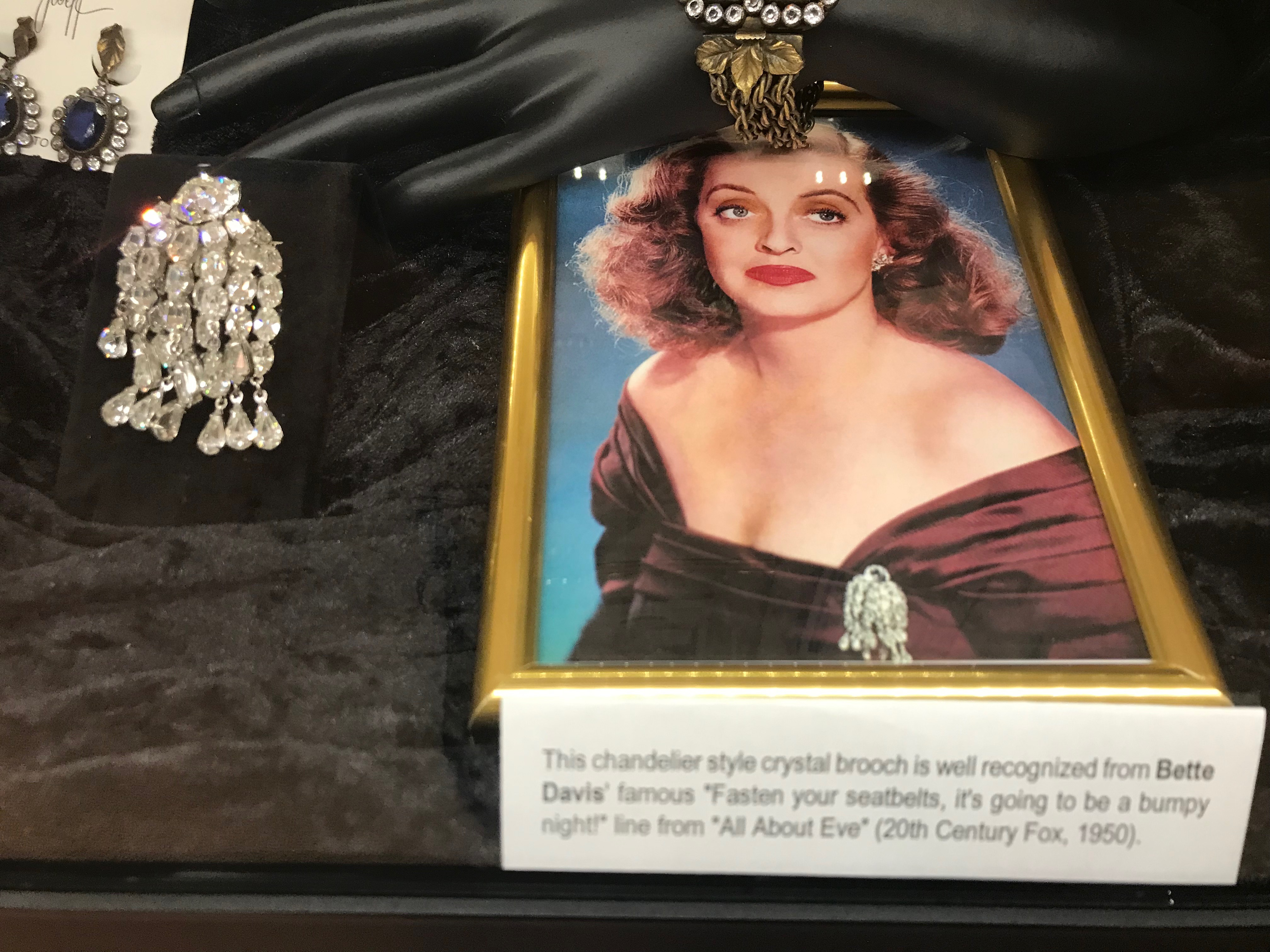
A Bette Davis brooch worn in All About Eve.

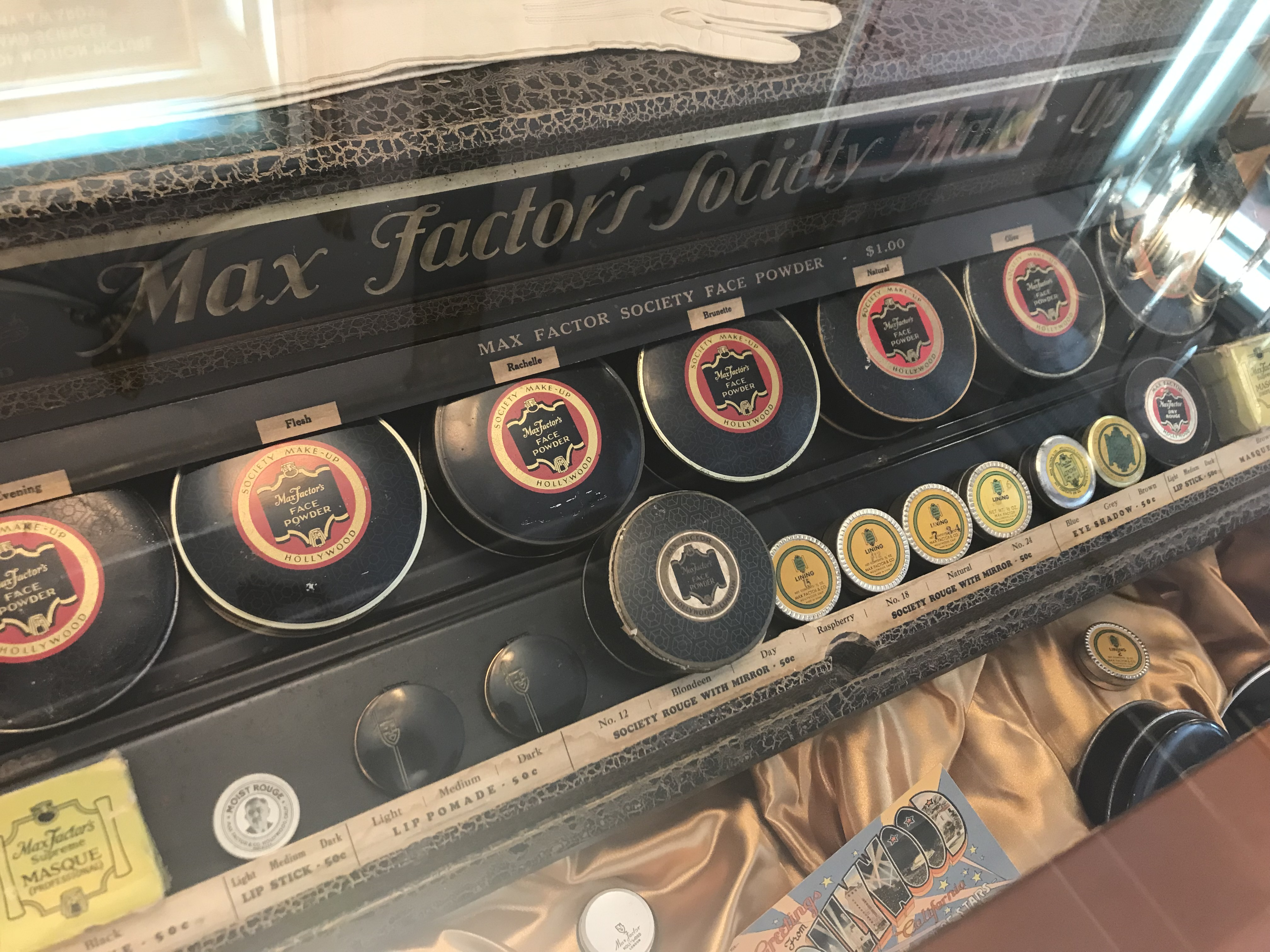
More vintage Max Factor products.

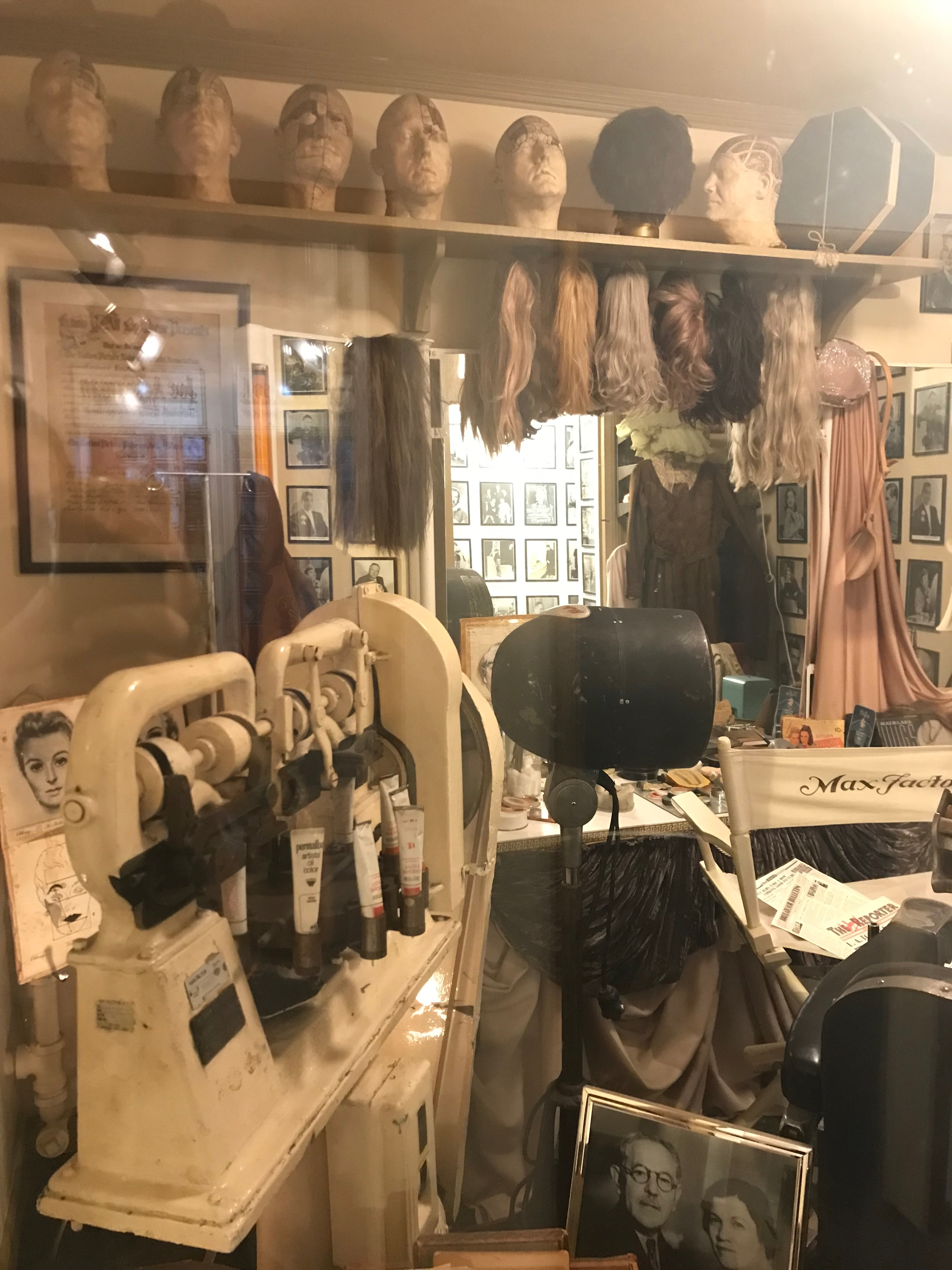
One of the makeup artist rooms at the museum.

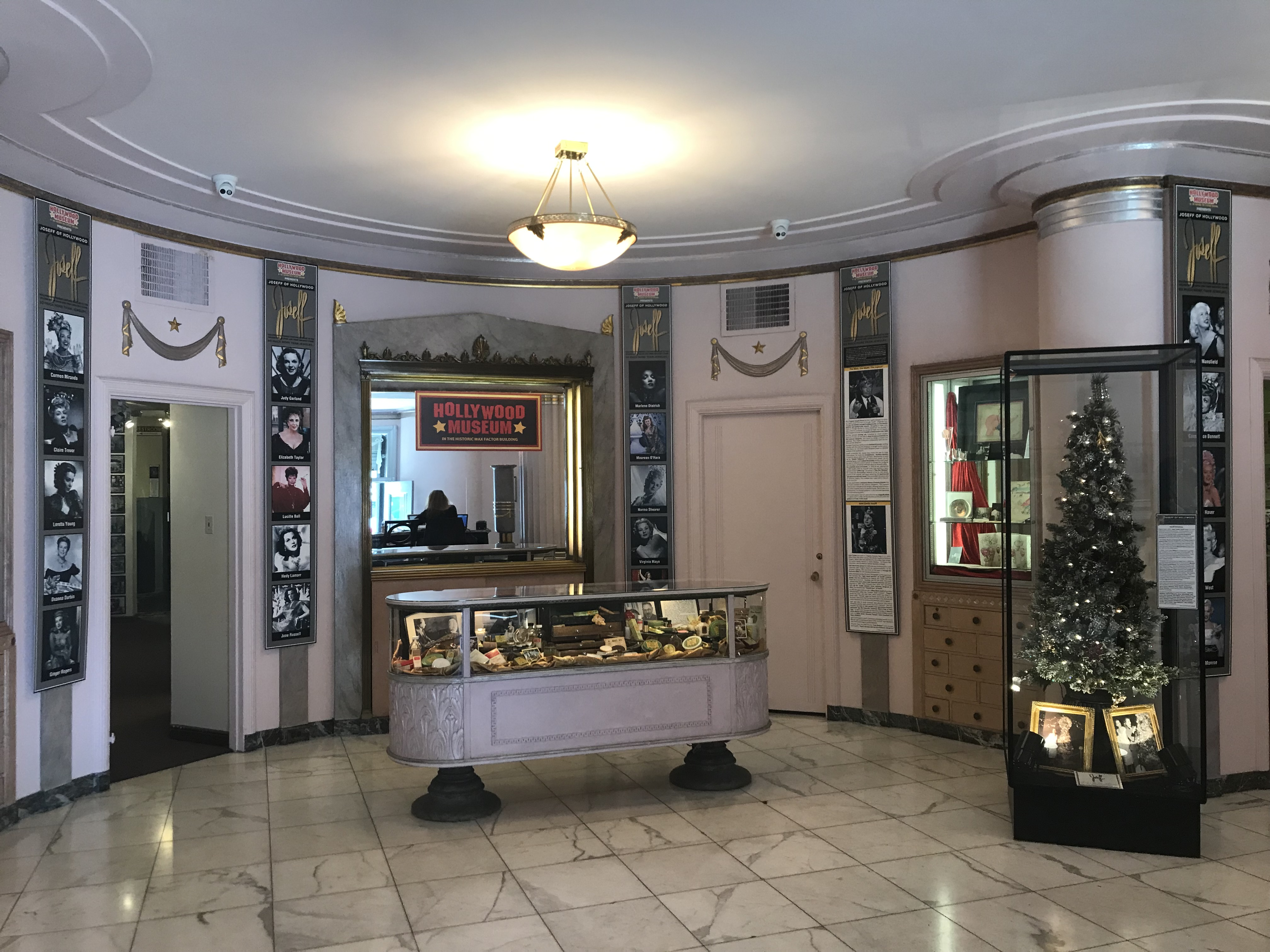
Hollywood Museum lobby.

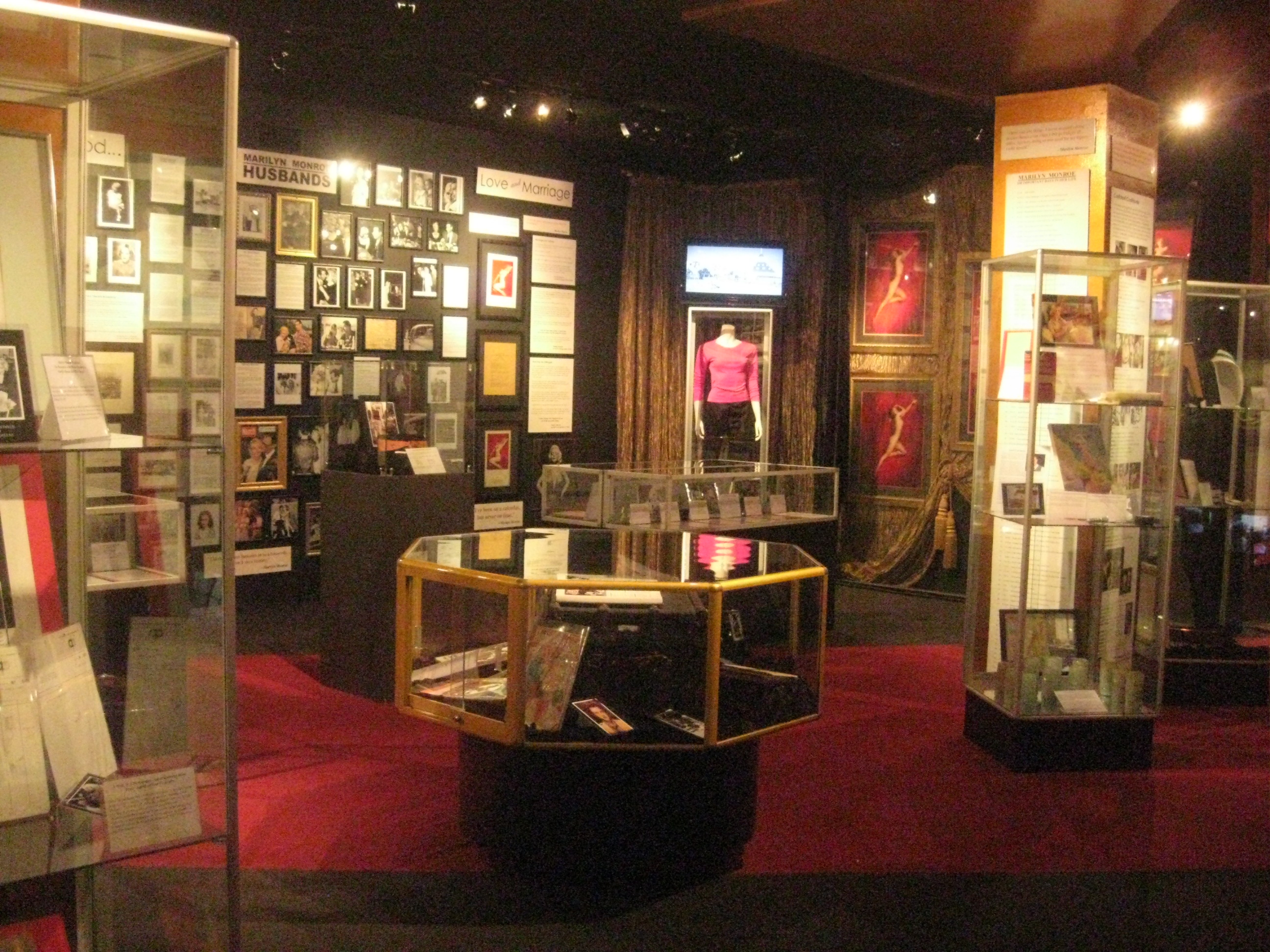
Marilyn Monroe exhibit at the museum.
