= Mel's Drive-In =

American restaurant chain

- Industry: Restaurant
- Genre: Diner
- Founded: 1947; 79 years ago in San Francisco, California, U.S.
- Founder: Mel Weiss and Harold Dobbs
- Area served: California, Nevada
- Website: melsdrive-in.com originalmels.com

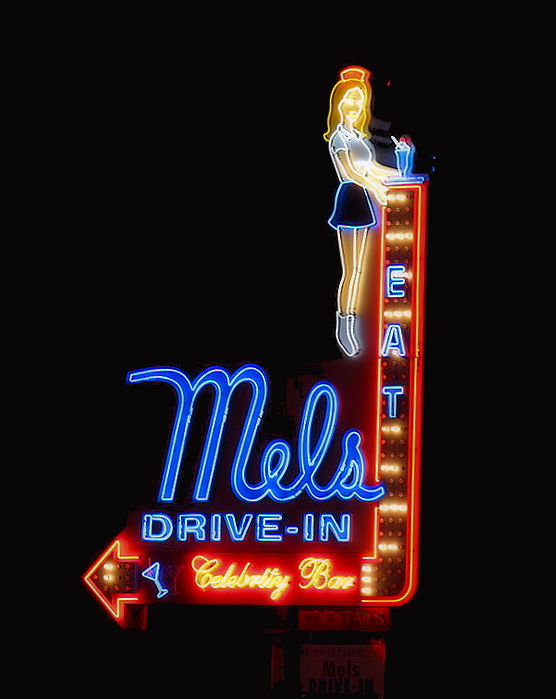
Mel's Drive-In neon sign, Los Angeles, CA

Mel's Drive-In refers to two American restaurant chains, the successors of a chain founded in 1947 by Mel Weiss and Harold Dobbs in San Francisco, California, United States. The original chain operated until the 1970s. A new generation of Mel's Drive-In restaurants then began opening in the 1980s, with the business split into two separate groups: one doing business under the original Mel's Drive-In name and the other under the name Original Mels.

Mel's Drive-In became closely associated with the 1973 film American Graffiti after one of its restaurants was used as a filming location. The film's distributor, Universal Studios, licensed the Mel's Drive-In brand to recreate the restaurants in its Universal theme parks.

== History ==
The first Mel's Drive-In was founded in 1947 by Mel Weiss and Harold Dobbs in San Francisco, California. It later expanded to several other locations.

After the last of the original restaurants closed in the 1970s, Weiss's son Steven Weiss and partner Donald Wagstaff opened the first of a new generation of Mel's Drive-In restaurants in 1985. A family rift between father and son caused them to part ways and form two chains, with Steven retaining the "Mel's Drive-In" name and Mel calling his restaurants "Original Mels". The elder Weiss then sold his company in 1994. The Original Mels locations are not listed on the official Mel's Drive-In website, and vice versa.

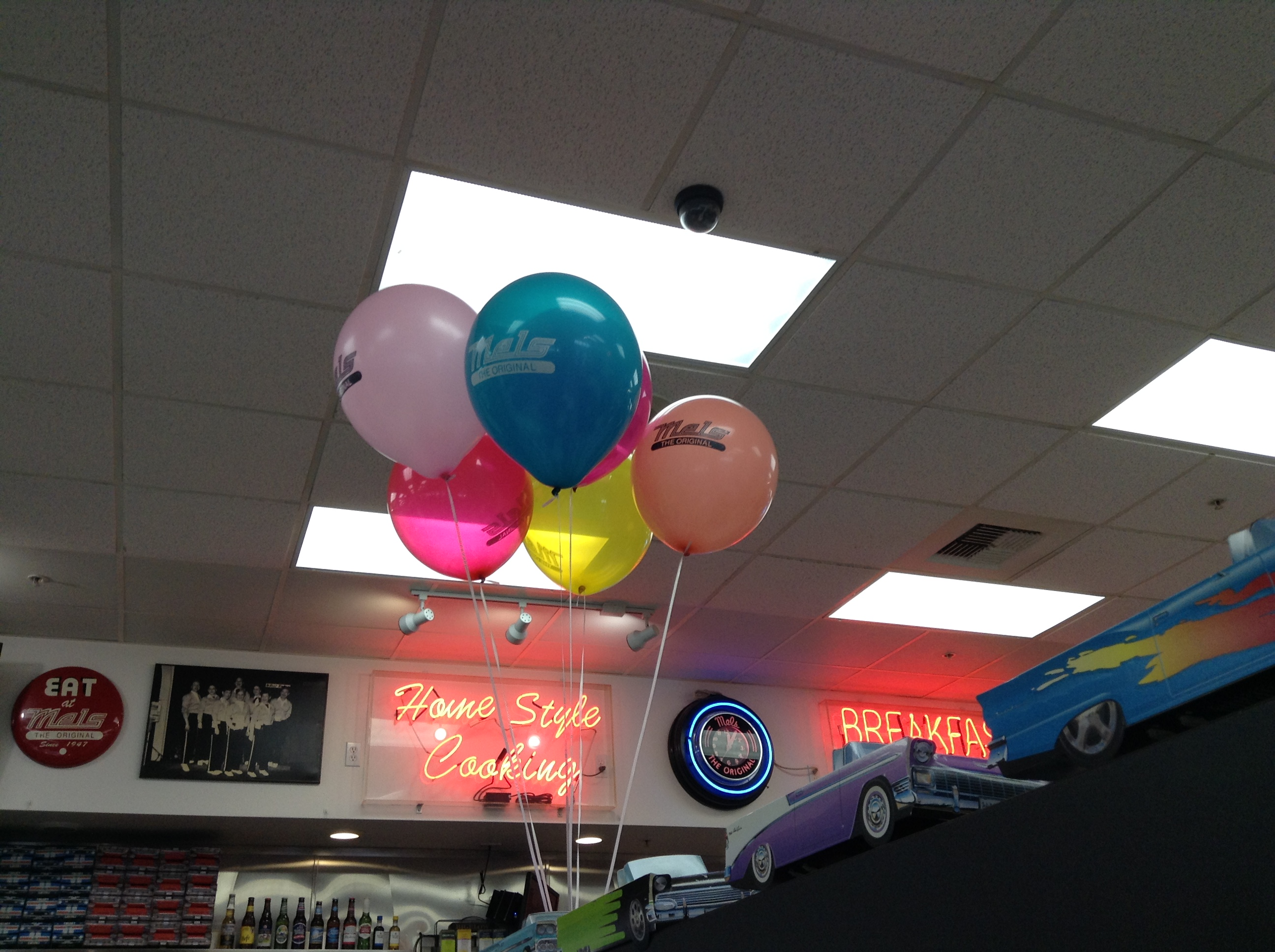
Interior of an Original Mels Diner

Starting on October 16, 1963, the Ad Hoc Committee to End Discrimination organized pickets and sit-ins at the Mel's Drive-In locations in San Francisco, Oakland, and Berkeley over the fact that while the restaurant would serve food to African Americans and hired them as cooks, they were not allowed to work "up front" where they could be seen by white customers. More than 100 protesters were arrested. The picketing ended when Harold Dobbs, Mel's Drive-In co-founder who was serving as a San Francisco City supervisor at the time, settled with the protesters and began to allow black workers upfront.

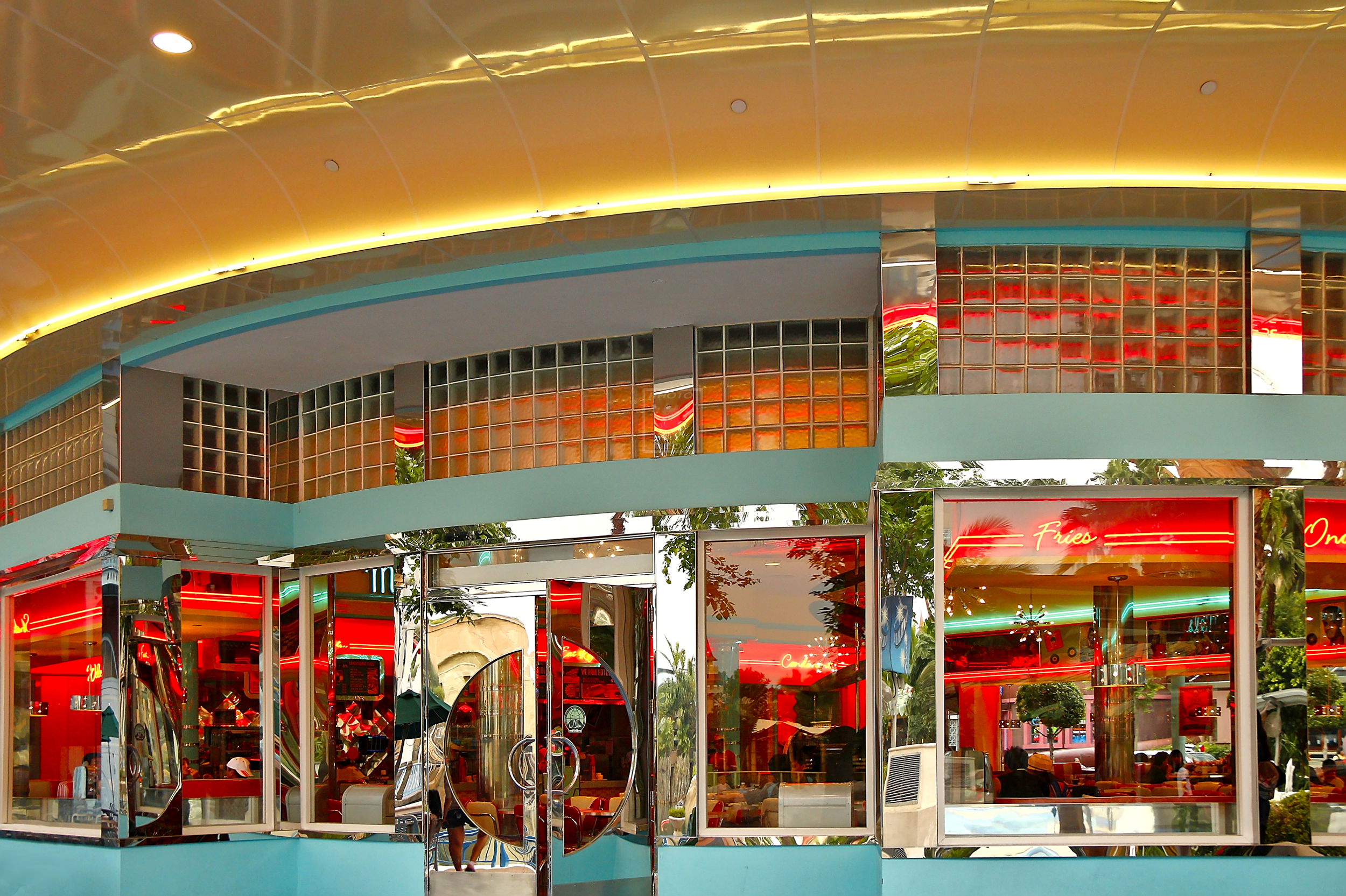
Mel's at Universal Studios Singapore

In 1972, the restaurant was selected as a feature location by George Lucas for his 1973 film American Graffiti. The Mel's used was located at 140 South Van Ness Avenue in San Francisco. It serves as the setting for the opening scene of the film as well as the backdrop for the opening credits, accompanied on the soundtrack by Bill Haley’s “Rock Around the Clock”.

Universal Studios has built replica Mel's Drive-In restaurants, resembling the one featured in American Graffiti, at their theme parks in Hollywood, Orlando, Japan, Beijing, and Singapore. The signage and menus on the original Mel's Diners did not have a possessive apostrophe in the name, as would be expected. Universal Studios opted to include the apostrophe in all Mel's Drive-In signage, literature, and media.

== Locations ==
=== Next generation Mel's Drive-In ===
As of 2025, the next generation Mel's Drive-In chain has eight locations, four in San Francisco and four in the Los Angeles Area. Some Mel's Drive-In locations are not drive-ins but rather diners. For example, while founded in San Francisco, none of the locations in the city currently serve food to patrons' cars.

The location near Downtown San Francisco, rechristened "Mel's Kitchen", has gone upscale, serving $12 cocktails, $16 burgers with locally sourced beef, ahi poke, acai smoothies, and avocado toast. That site was almost demolished in 2018 to build housing.

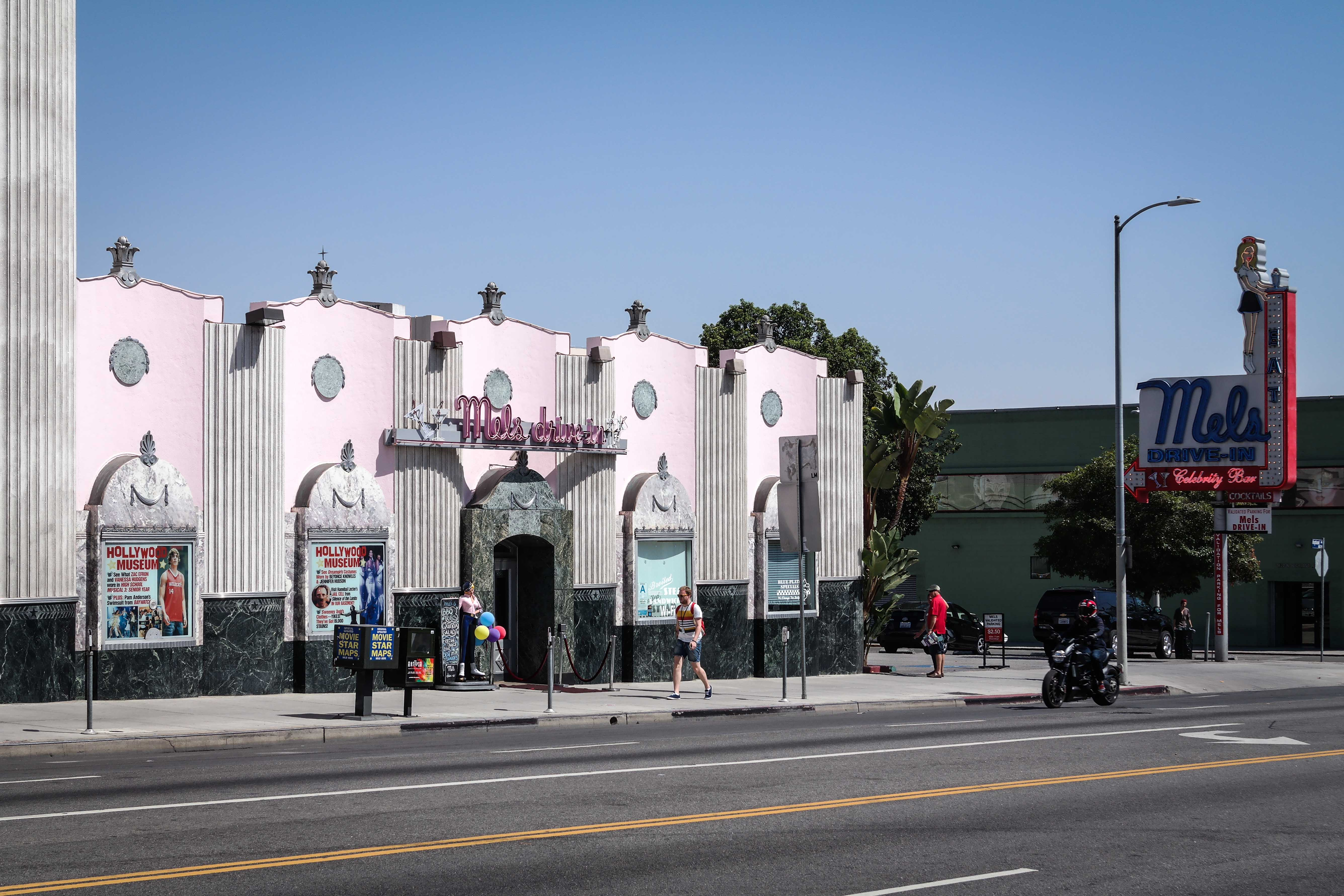
Mel's Drive-In in the historic Max Factor Building in Hollywood

All four locations in the Los Angeles area are housed in historic buildings. Mel's Drive-In in the Sherman Oaks neighborhood of Los Angeles was built as Kerry's coffee shop in 1953. The googie style building was designed by Armet & Davis. Mel's Drive-In in West Hollywood was built as Ben Frank's in 1962. The googie style building was designed by Lane & Schlick. Mel's Drive-In in Hollywood is located in a portion of the former Max Factor makeup studio designed by theater architect S. Charles Lee. The Hollywood Regency style building was designed by S. Charles Lee and built in 1935. The Mel's Drive-In in Santa Monica was built as The Penguin in 1958. The googie style building was designed by Armet & Davis.

=== Original Mels ===
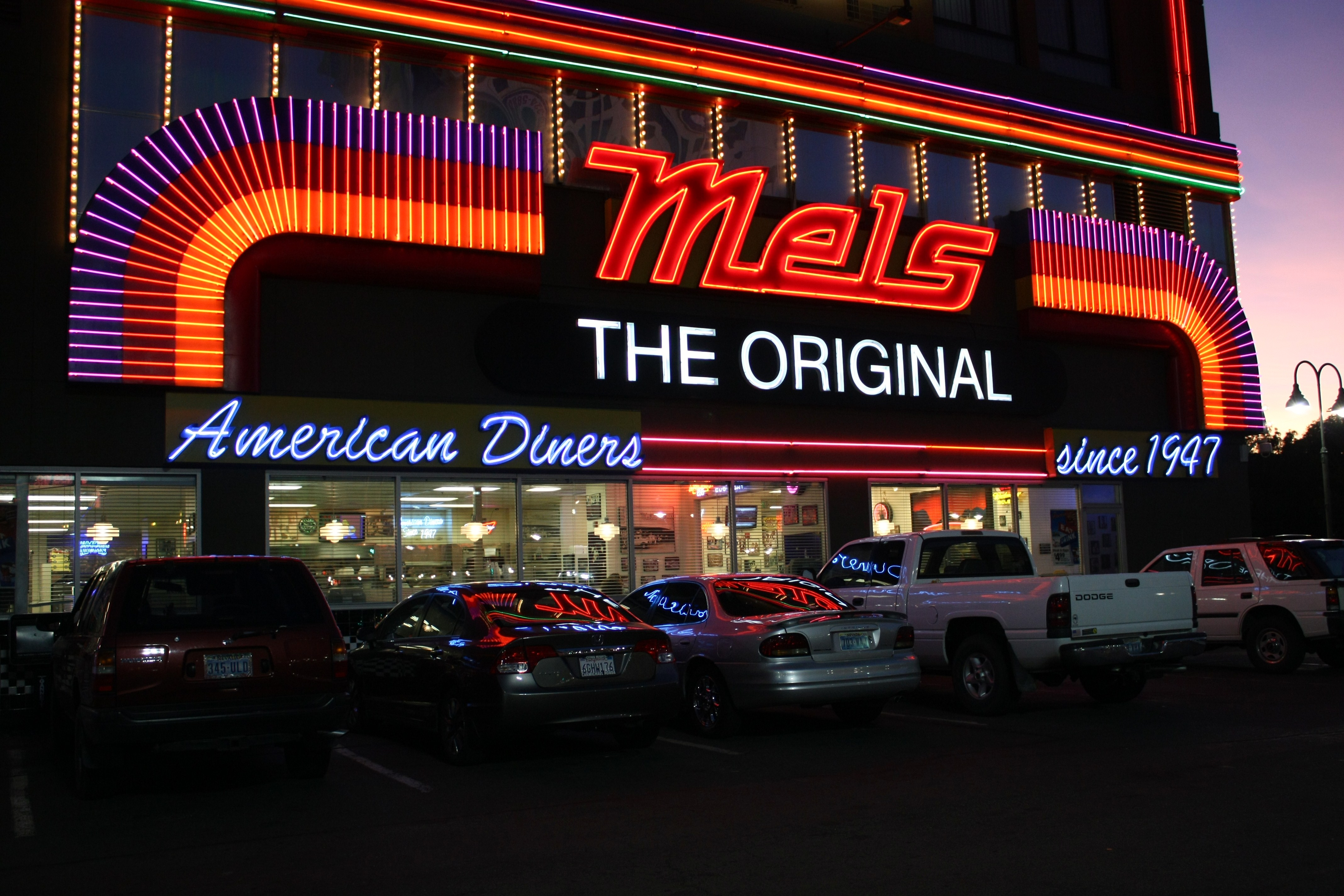
The Original Mels - 2009

The Original Mels chain has 22 locations across Northern California and Nevada. There are some Northern California locations that share the same general American Graffiti nostalgia theme and the similarly styled Mel's logo.

== In popular culture ==
Mel's was used as a location in the 1967 film Guess Who's Coming to Dinner. Spencer Tracy and Katharine Hepburn are out for a drive, and Tracy pulls into Mel's and orders Oregon boysenberry ice cream; he then has a minor traffic altercation with a black man. The Mel's was located in the Excelsior district of San Francisco. Hepburn and Tracy never actually visited the location.

Mel's restaurants have since been featured in other media, such as Melrose Place (1996, Season 5, Episode 1), Doonesbury comics (December 18, 1989), and the book The American Drive-in by Mike Witzel.

== Gallery ==
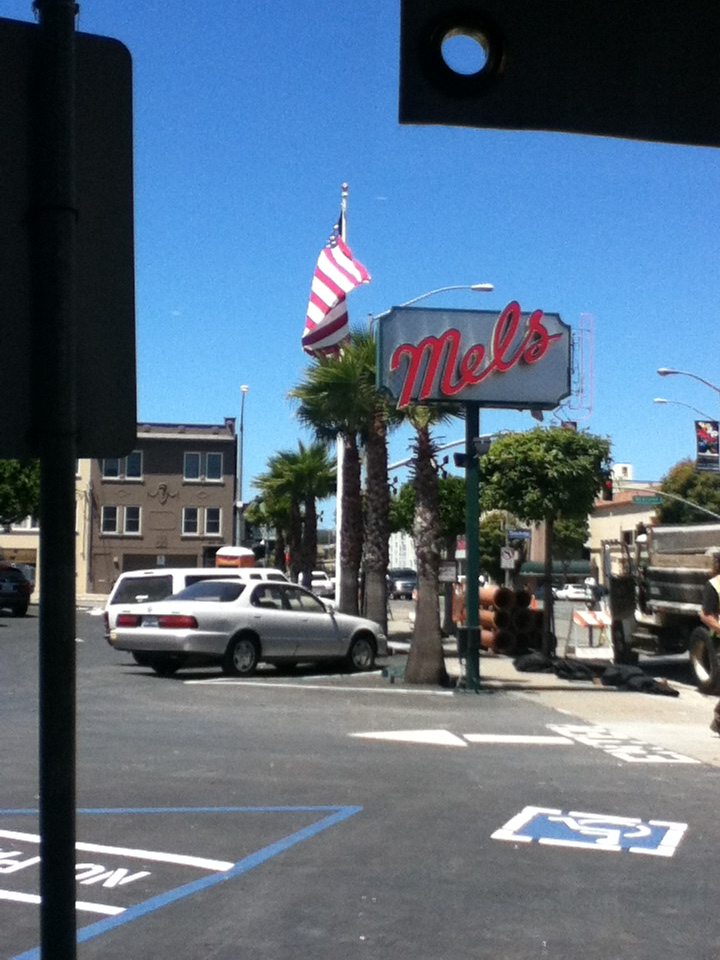
Mel's Drive-In sign in San Francisco.

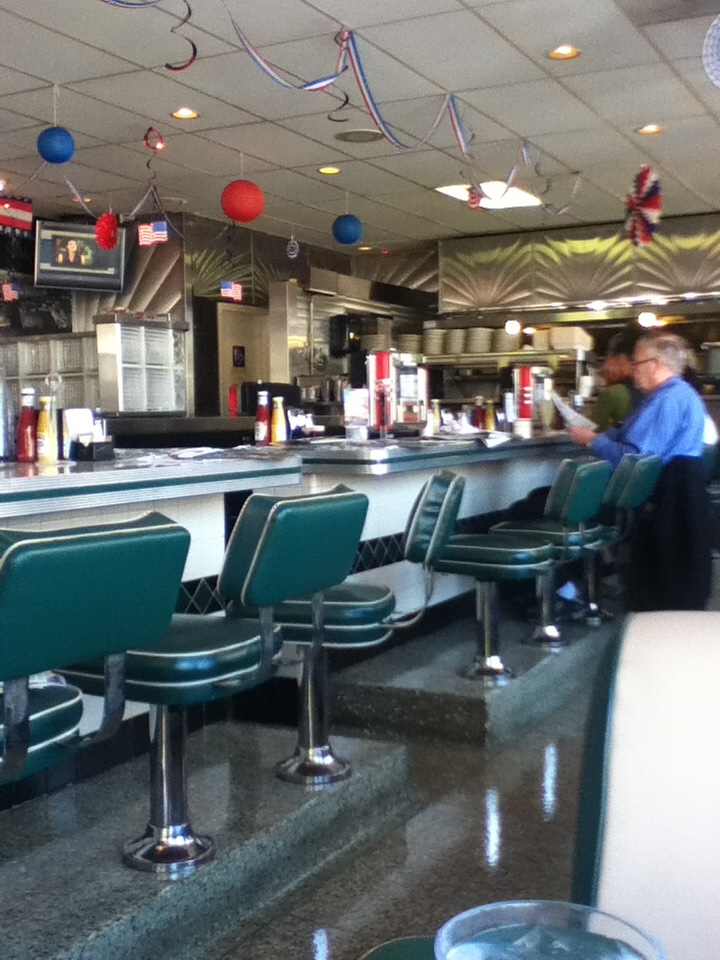
Counter seating at a Mel's Drive-In

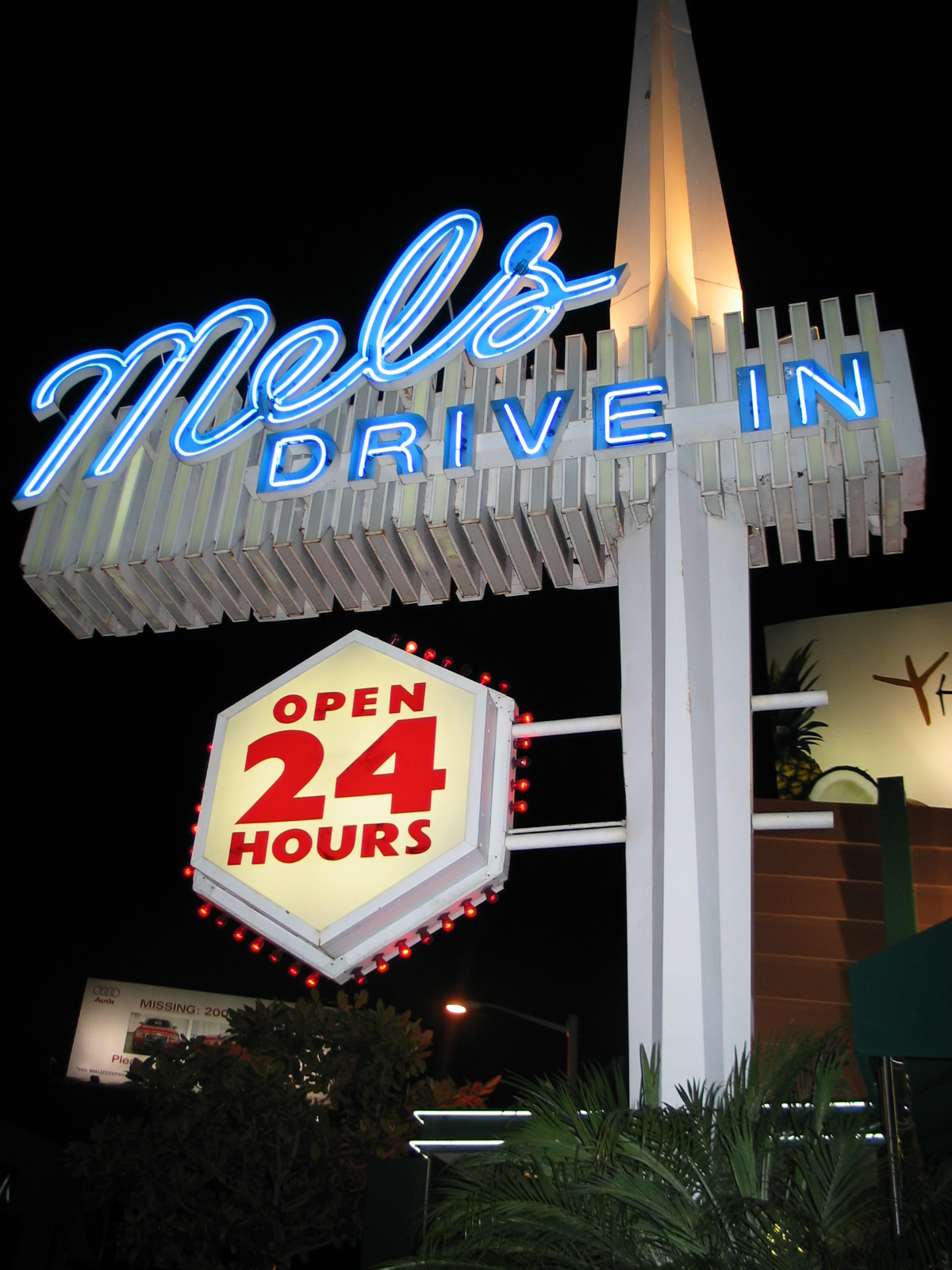
Mel's drive in Hollywood

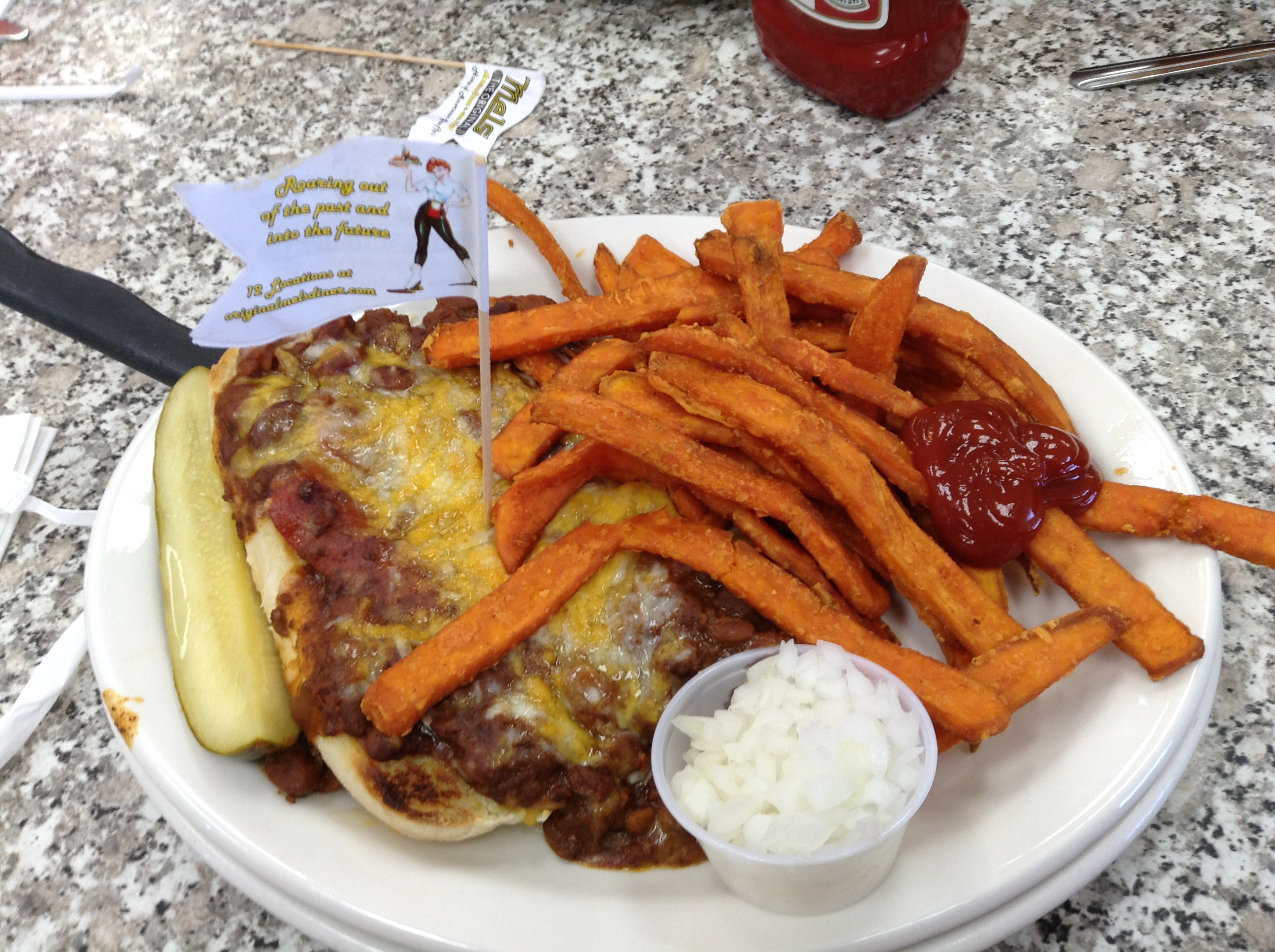
Sweet potato fries at Original Mel's Diner

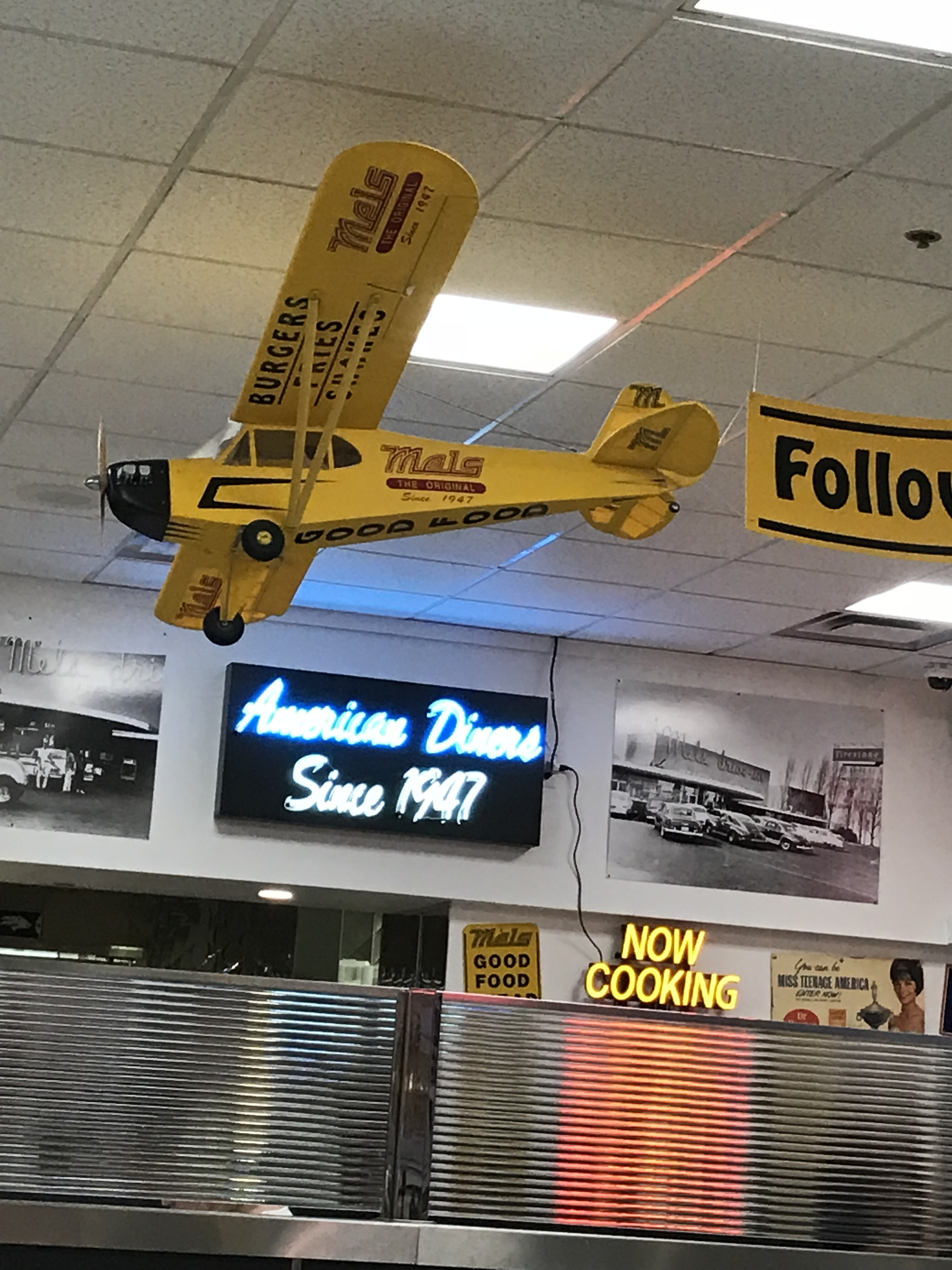
Original Mel's Diner at Boomtown in Verdi, Nevada

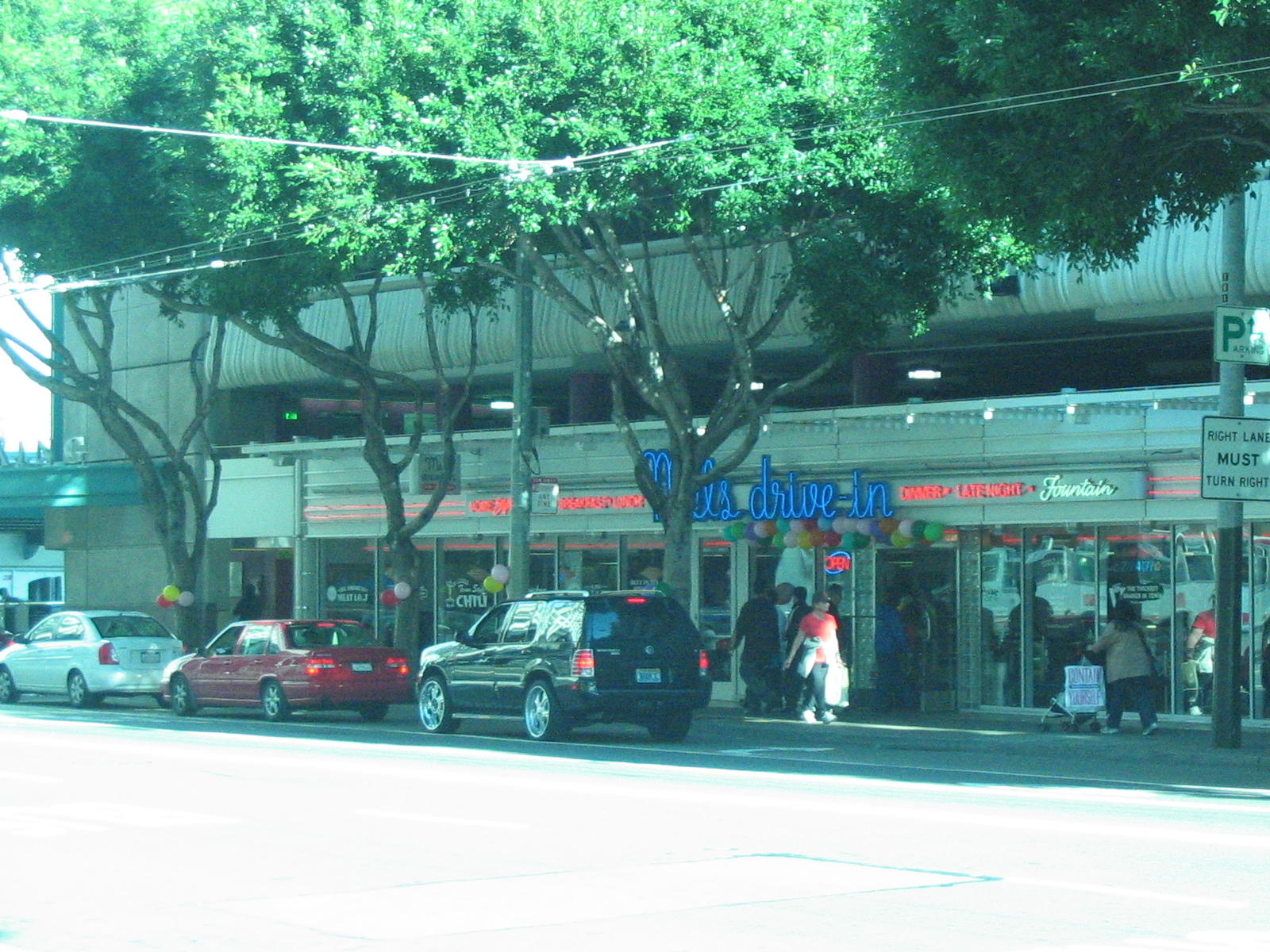
Mel's Drive-In on Mission Street in San Francisco

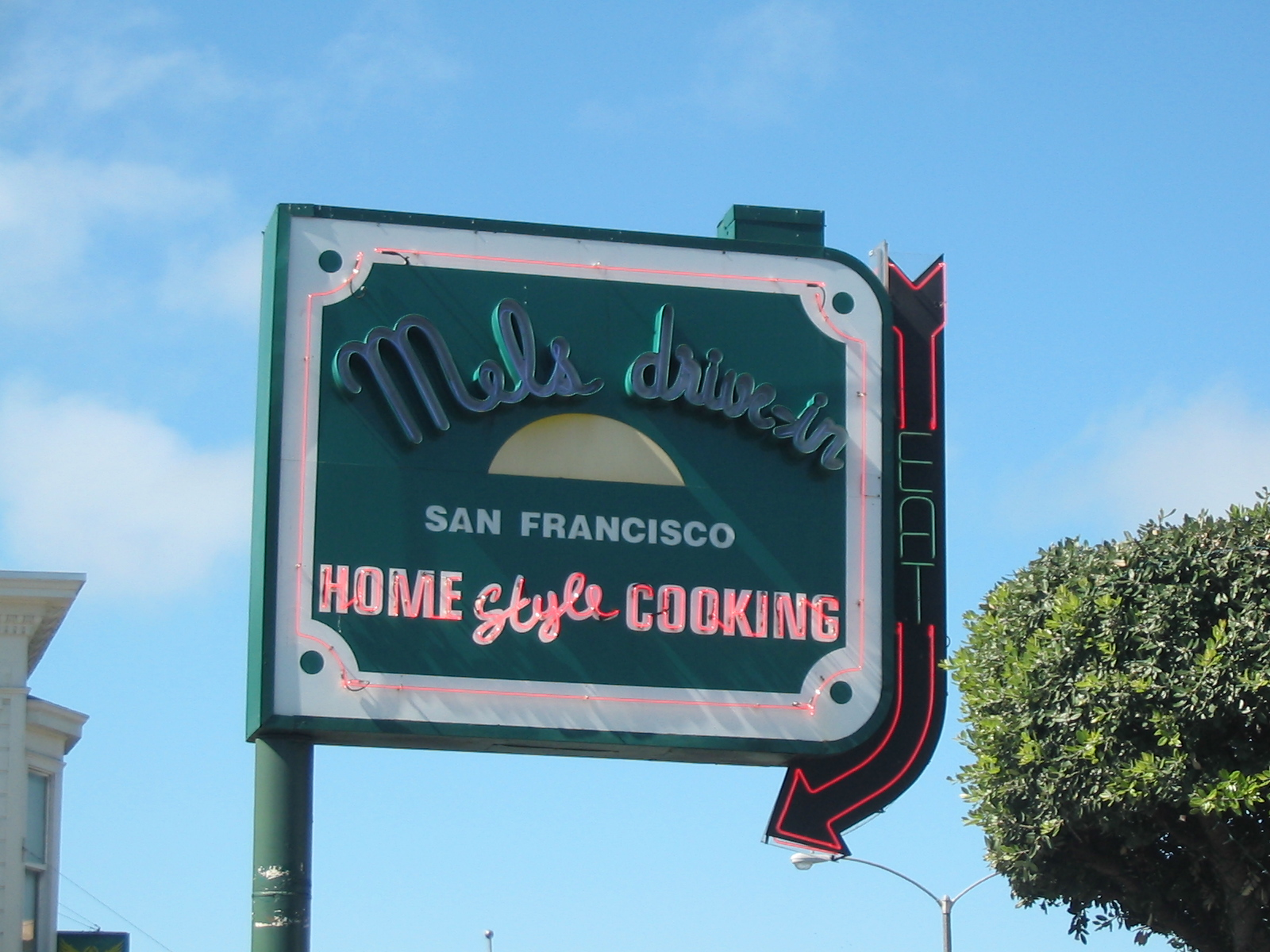
Mel's Drive-In sign in San Francisco

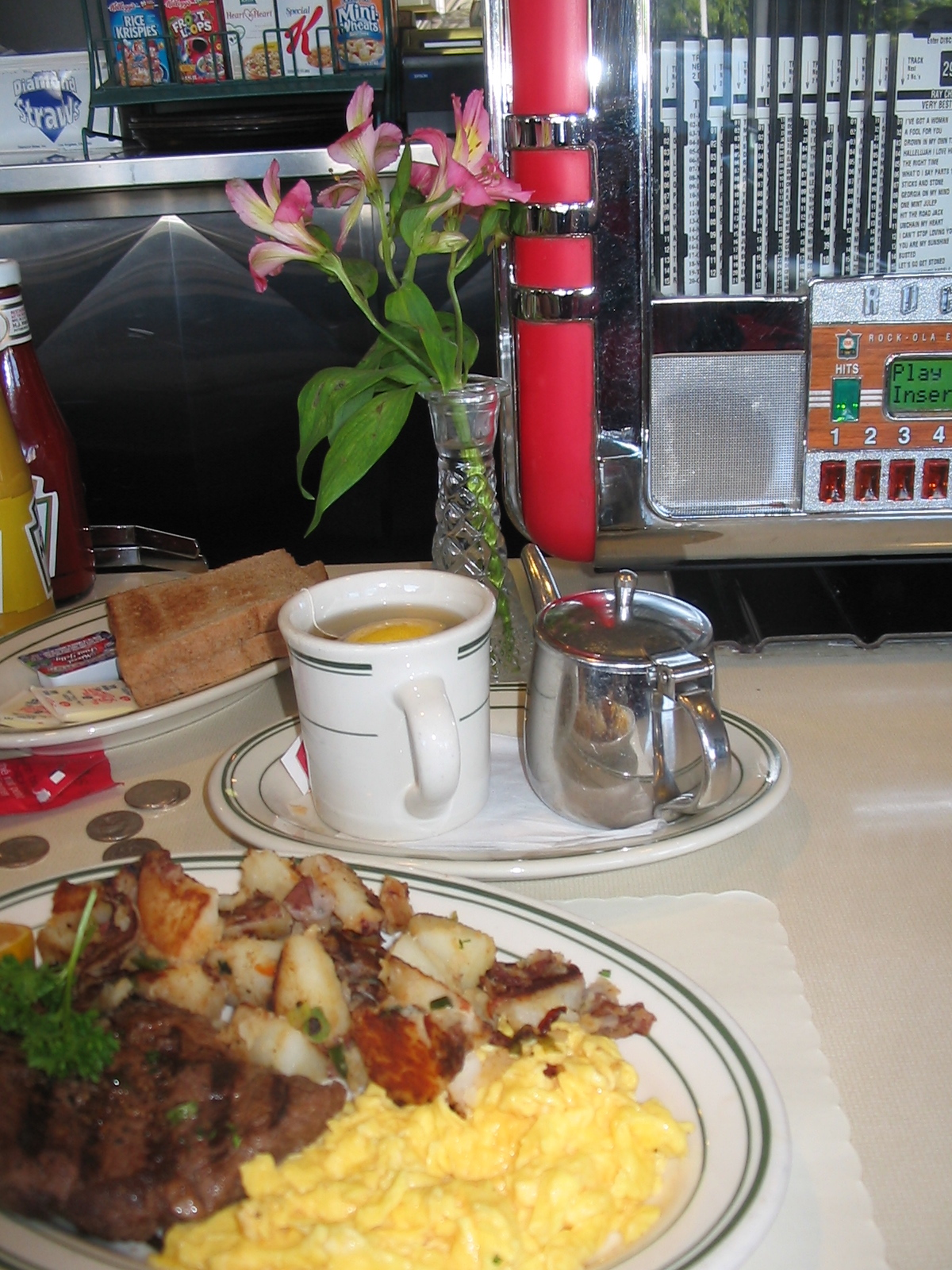
Breakfast at Mel's Drive-in

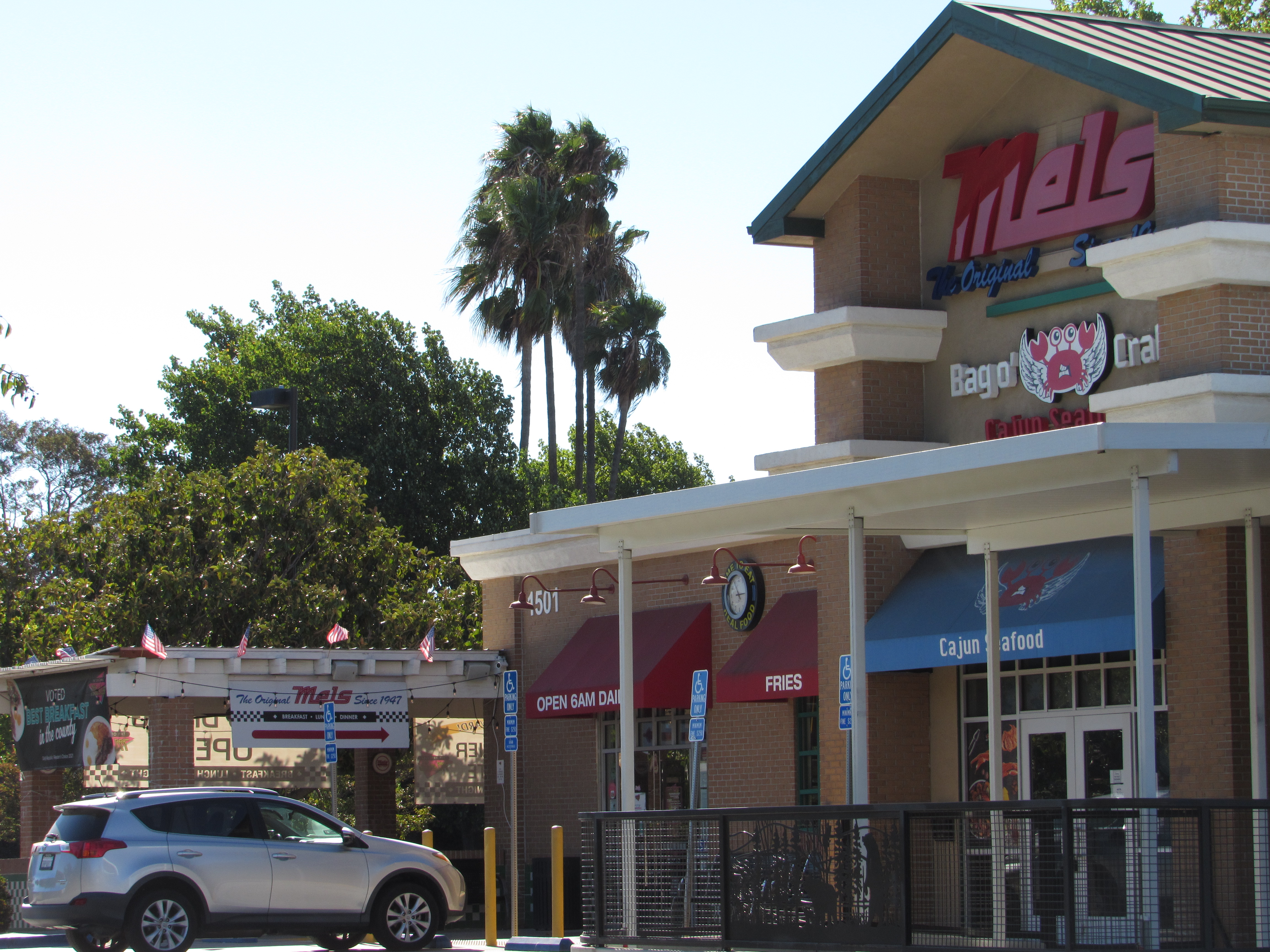
Original Mel's in Fairfield, California
