= Ben Frank's =

Restaurant in West Hollywood, California

Ben Frank's was a restaurant in West Hollywood, California, opened in 1962 by Arthur Simms and Bob Ehrman. The location, surrounded by the famous nightclubs of the Sunset Strip, led to a celebrity clientele, and the 24-hour restaurant became a popular late night destination. The distinctive googie architecture and eye-catching neon sign helped attract musicians like Jim Morrison and Frank Zappa, as well as patrons of the nearby music venues. The youthful patrons that frequented the restaurant inspired the producers of the Monkees TV show to place an ad seeking "spirited Ben Frank's types" when casting the show in 1965.

Arthur Simms and his son Thomas Simms went on to open two more Ben Frank's locations and started the Copper Penny and Wooden Shoe restaurant chains. In 1976, they acquired The Kettle restaurant in Manhattan Beach, California. In the 1970s, they became partners in the French Market restaurant in West Hollywood, California, which became the model for their first Mimi's Cafe restaurant, which opened in Anaheim in 1978. The company was sold to Bob Evans in 2004. The original Ben Frank's on Sunset closed in 1996.

Mel's Drive-In renamed and rehabilitated the building in 1997, redesigning much of the interior and adding new windows but maintaining the distinctive A-Frame architecture and replacing the letters on the original sign structure. The original neon letters are on display at the Valley Relics Museum in Van Nuys, California. The sign and the original Ben Frank's are briefly visible in the 1965 black and white concert film The Big T.N.T. Show.

In 2020, following widespread restaurant closures due to the COVID-19 pandemic, Mel's reinstituted carhop service.
