= Max Factor Salon =

Historic building in Hollywood, California, U.S.

- U.S. Historic district – Contributing property
- Los Angeles Historic-Cultural Monument
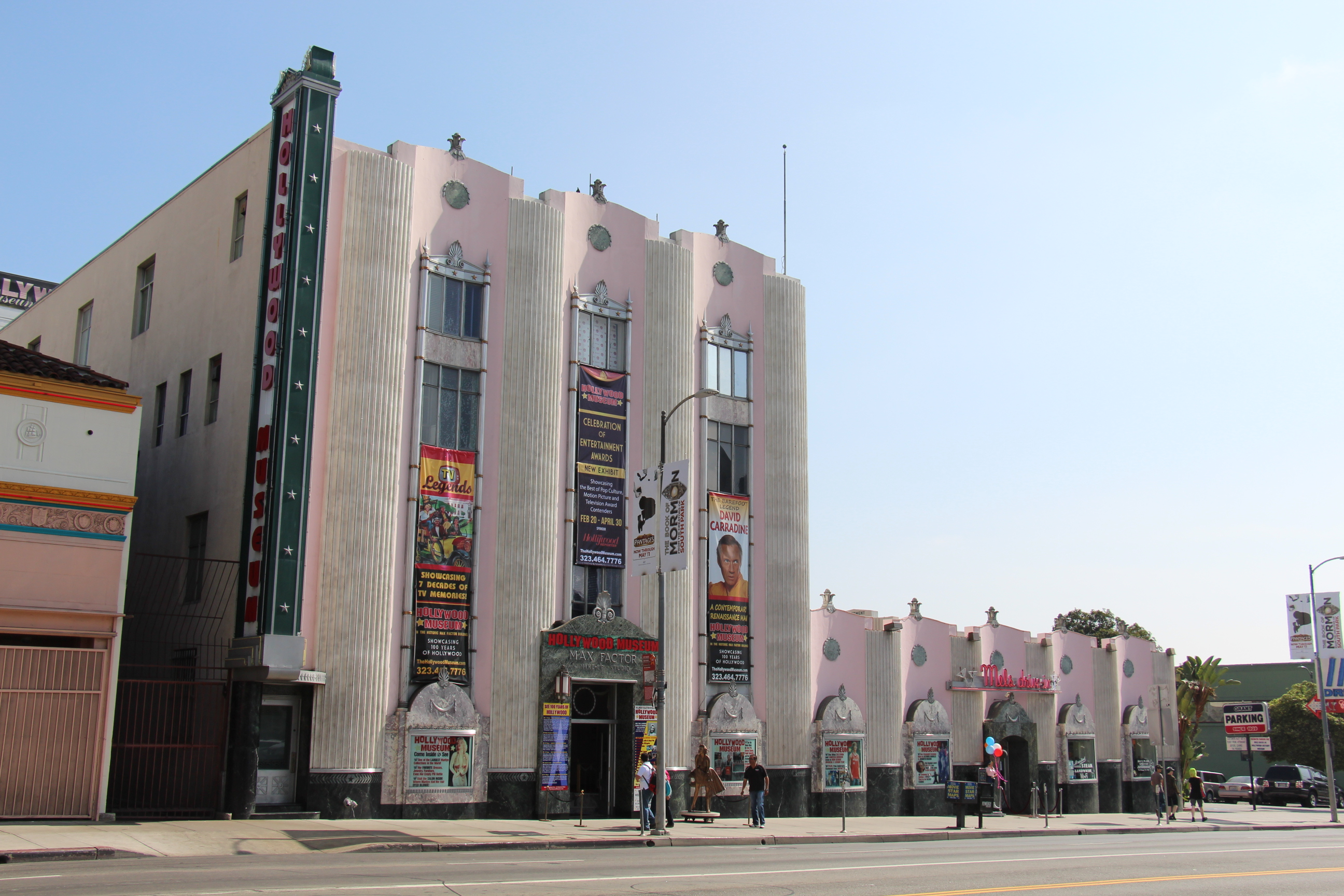
- The building in 2014

- Location within the Los Angeles metropolitan area
- Location: 1666 N. Highland Ave; Hollywood, California
- Coordinates: 34.101°N 118.338°W
- Built: 1931 (remodel)
- Architect: S. Charles Lee
- Architectural style: Hollywood Regency
- Part of: Hollywood Boulevard Commercial and Entertainment District (ID85000704)
- LAHCM No.: 593

Significant dates
- Designated CP: April 4, 1985
- Designated LAHCM: April 26, 1994

Max Factor Salon, formerly Hollywood Fire Safe Building, also known as Max Factor Building, is a historic four-story building located at 1666 N. Highland Avenue, Hollywood, California, just south of Hollywood Boulevard. It is best known for its more than five decade tenant Max Factor, and is currently home to the Hollywood Museum and Mel's Drive-In.

== History ==
Max Factor Salon was originally the C. E. Toberman-owned Hollywood Fire Safe Building before it was bought by Max Factor in 1928. The building was remodeled by renowned theater architect S. Charles Lee, and in 1935, it re-opened featuring a ground-floor salon, make-up manufacturing on the three floors above, and the Max Factor Make Up Studio in an added one-story wing. 3000 people were invited to the re-opening but more than 8000 attended, and after re-opening, the building earned the nickname the "Jewel Box of the Cosmetic World" and the make-up studio earned the nickname "The Pink Powder Puff."

Virtually all of Classic Hollywood's greatest actresses frequented the salon and make-up studio. Jean Harlow dedicated the salon's Blonde Room, Claudette Colbert the Brunette Room, and Ginger Rogers the Red Head Room.

In 1985, the Hollywood Boulevard Commercial and Entertainment District was added to the National Register of Historic Places, with Max Factor Salon listed as a contributing property in the district. In 1994, the building was declared Los Angeles Historic-Cultural Monument No. 593.

In the early 1990s, The Max Factor Museum of Beauty occupied the building, the building itself owned by Procter & Gamble. The museum closed in 1996. In 2001, a Mel's Drive In opened in the building's one-story wing, with the Hollywood Museum occupying the rest of the building in 2002 and opening in 2003.

In 2011, the building held an I Love Lucy reunion to celebrate Lucille Ball’s 100th birthday and the 60th anniversary of the show. In attendance were Ball's daughter Lucy Arnaz as well as many filmmakers who worked on the show.

== Architecture ==
Max Factor Building, a four-story brick and stucco structure, was remodeled in the early 1930s by S. Charles Lee, who also added a one-story wing. The remodel combined art deco and regency revival styles into a Hollywood look called Hollywood Regency.

Aspects of the building that define its look include four street-to-roof fluted pilasters, a green marble base, curved display windows containing bronze, copper, and pewter finished aluminum castings, bas-relief ornaments, art-deco rooftop ornaments, and an entrance and window cases clad in marble and decorated with medallions and garlands. Inside, the building features an art deco lobby that contains pastel hues, marble archways, trompe l’oeil, faux finishes, and crystal chandeliers.

== In popular culture ==
The Max Factor Building in Universal Studios Orlando was modeled after the Max Factor Salon, as was an unnamed one-story building in Disney’s Hollywood Studios.

The building appears in 2011's L.A. Noire as a discoverable landmark.

== See also ==
- List of Los Angeles Historic-Cultural Monuments in Hollywood
- List of contributing properties in the Hollywood Boulevard Commercial and Entertainment District
