= Hollywood Regency =

Design style of Hollywood's Golden Era

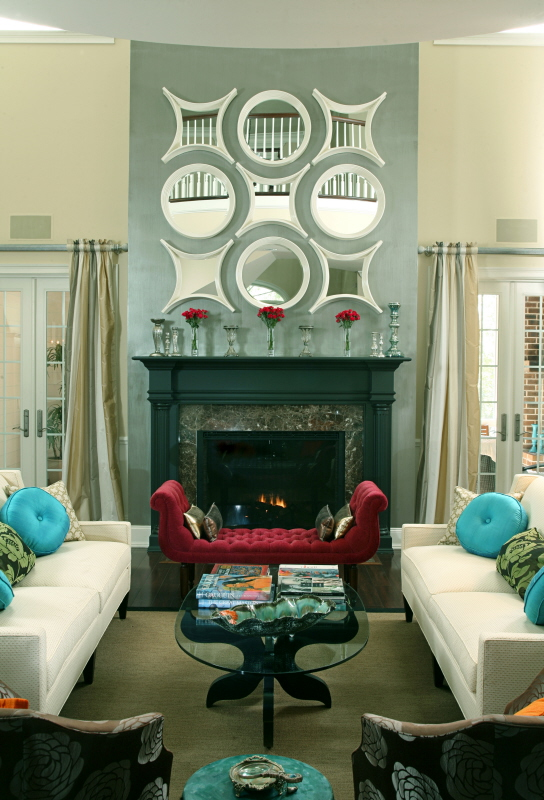
Living room in Hollywood Regency style, drawing on its tendency to favor turquoise, mirrors, and strong dark/ white contrasts

Hollywood Regency, sometimes called Regency Moderne, is a design style that describes both interior design, architecture, and landscape architecture characterized by the bold use of color and contrast often with metallic and glass accents meant to signify both opulence and comfort. It is named for the movie-making industry of southern California as typified by the glamorous homes and estates of the actors and actresses of Hollywood's "Golden Era", roughly from the 1920s through the 1950s, and typified by the work of designers such as Dorothy Draper and Billy Haines. The term "Hollywood Regency" appears to have originated with Draper in the 1920s. It remains a current and lively area of design work both inside and outside of southern California.

== Characteristics ==
Hollywood Regency is more ornamental, eclectic and maximalist than Art Deco.

Hollywood Regency is glitz and glamour covered in lacquer, chrome, and mirrored finishes. Every detail is meant to convey luxury and there is always the feeling that people should look good in the design— particularly if they are wearing satin bathrobes and sipping a cocktail.

— Rochelle Greayer

It is a style meant to feel frivolously overdone and pleasantly, extravagantly unbalanced, yet sleek and modern, not unlike the Rococo style and in contrast to the strict, repetitive ornament of styles such as Baroque. Blocks of contrasting color, especially pink, turquoise (from dark near-blue to bright pale seafoam), yellow, and black-and-white checkerboard are highly favored, sometimes in orderly but asymmetric repetition or in different textures of soft furnishings in the same high-ceilinged, large-windowed room.

Whole mirrors (not mosaics) cover the surfaces of furniture such as dressers and side tables, and are used to cover entire walls and sometimes ceilings. Animal prints (zebra, cheetah, snakeskin, etc.) as well as complex floral designs in both black-and-white and shades of single colors are used as rugs, tablecloths, and seat cushions. Imitation bamboo stalks are used as trim in shower doors, vanities, table legs, and other household furniture. The divan, with its plush sides and asymmetric shape, is a staple furniture item. Oversized black-and-white wall prints of famous actresses are common. The criss-cross and zig-zag are universal, whether symmetrical or not. Sunburst mirrors are almost ubiquitous.

== Designers ==
Personalities known for defining this style include those such as George Vernon Russell, Douglas Honnold, John Woolf, and Paul R. Williams.

== Architecture ==
Buildings featuring Hollywood Regency architecture include Max Factor Salon and Los Angeles Department of Water and Power Distributing Station No. 29.

== Gallery ==
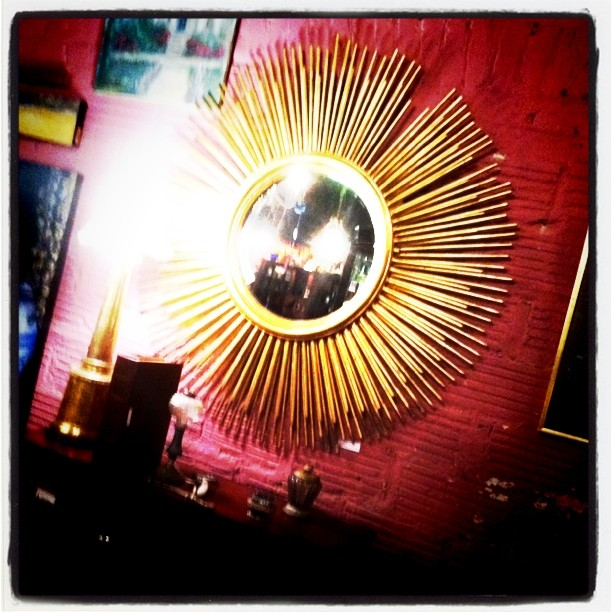
The sunburst wall mirror and clock in either silver or gold is a regular feature of the Hollywood Regency style.

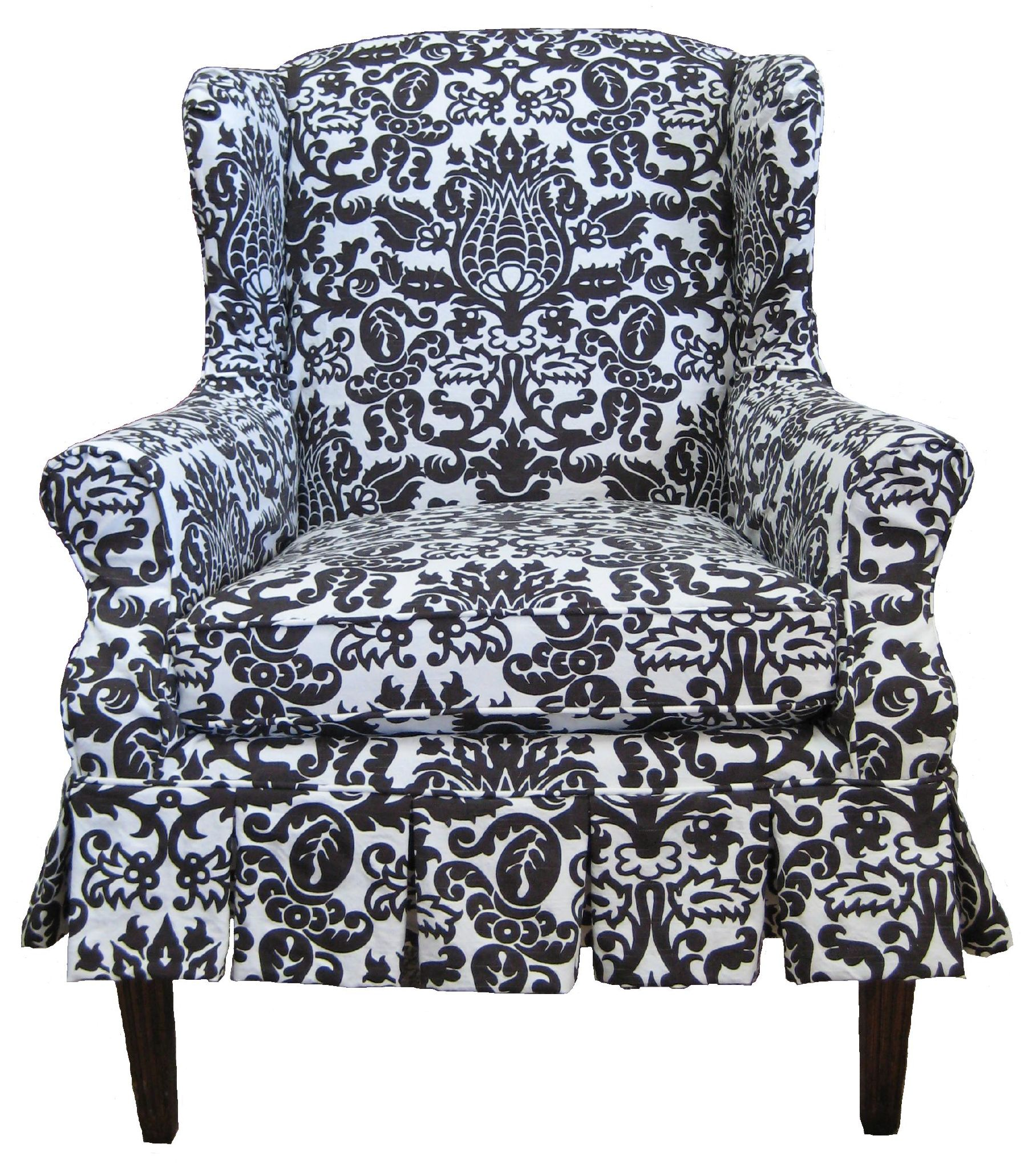
Damask slipcovered wing chair
