= Berry Mansion =

Historic house in Kentucky, United States

Coordinates: 38.1880°N 84.8816°W

- George F. Berry House
- U.S. National Register of Historic Places
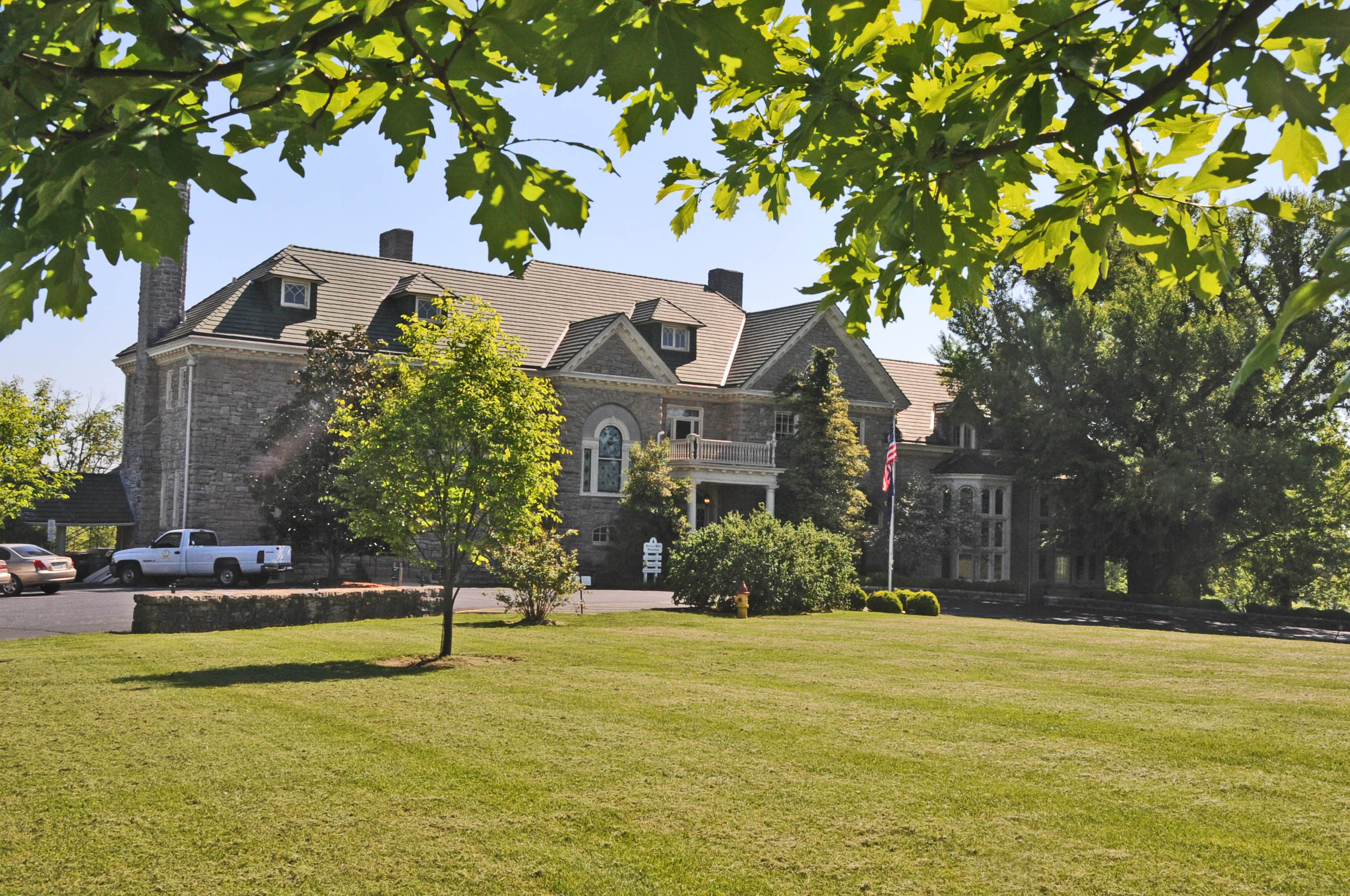

- Location within Kentucky Location within the United States
- Location: 700 Louisville Rd., Frankfort, Kentucky
- Area: 37 acres (15 ha)
- Built: 1900
- Architect: Dodd, William J.; Cobb, Arthur, et al
- Architectural style: Colonial Revival
- NRHP reference No.: 02000915
- Added to NRHP: September 6, 2002

The Berry Mansion was built in Frankfort, Kentucky, in 1900 by George Franklin Berry. It is located on a hill just west of downtown that overlooks the state capitol building.

The 200-acre (0.81 km^{2}) estate surrounding the home was named "Juniper Hill" after the red cedar trees (Juniperus virginiana) located on the property.

== History ==
This estate has had several names over the years. The earliest was Monroe Hill, after Thomas Bell Monroe (1791–1865) who served in the following offices: Kentucky House of Representatives, Kentucky Secretary of State, U.S. District Attorney, and U.S. District Judge. Before the Civil War, he built the first large house on this site, Montrose.

The property became a campground for Union Army soldiers during the Civil War. In 1863, a detachment of Confederate cavalrymen attacked an encampment of sick Union soldiers here. Union cavalry troopers coming into Frankfort from Louisville arrived in time to rescue their beleaguered comrades. Later the property was owned by a gentleman known as "Preacher Arnold." It was from Preacher Arnold that George Franklin Berry and his wife Mary Stone Bush Berry purchased the property in 1899. Along the drive to the main house is a watering "trough" that bears the initials "GFB 1899," noting the Berrys arrival and ownership of the estate.

They called the 200-acre (0.81 km^{2}) estate Juniper Hill because of the many red cedar trees – Juniperus Virginiana – that grew here. Berry was a prosperous executive in the Frankfort whisky distilling industry with W.A. Gaines & Company, makers of Old Crow and Hermitage bourbons. The Berrys chose the Louisville architect William J. Dodd to design their new home. The house is representative of the grand homes built by wealthy Kentuckians in that era – extravagant but grounded in traditional architectural and decorative styles. The twenty-two-room mansion is built with stone quarried on the site. he basement was blasted from solid rock.

The architect, William J. Dodd (1862–1930) studied architecture in Chicago and worked in Louisville between 1884 and 1913. Dodd held apprenticeships with various prominent architectural firms, including McKim, Meade, and White – a premiere Beaux Arts architectural firm, and notable Chicago architect William Le Baron Jenney. While in partnership with Mason Maury, they designed the Kentucky Building for the 1893 Columbian Exposition in Chicago.

Dodd's work was not limited to just buildings; he designed furnishings and other decorative arts for some of his works of architecture. In the early 20th century Dodd was commissioned by Gates Pottery to design vases and other pots for the TECO line along with other famous architects like Frank Lloyd Wright, Louis H. Sullivan, and Fernand Moreau. These pieces designed by Dodd and the TECO line are highly prized by collectors of early 20th century decorative arts.

The Berrys were married in 1878. Mary Stone Bush Berry(1859–1950) was a daughter of Samuel Stone Bush and Cornelia Wheat Bush of Louisville, and a granddaughter of Judge Zachariah Wheat, a prominent judge in Kentucky. Samuel Stone Bush was an attorney and Cornelia Wheat Bush was the first woman to serve as State Librarian in Kentucky, from 1878 to 1880.

George Franklin Berry (1856–1938) was the son of Hiram Berry and Eleanor Berry. Hiram Berry and his wife and children moved to Frankfort while George Franklin Berry was an infant. Hiram Berry partnered with W.A. Gaines and E.H. Taylor to form W.A. Gaines and Company, which was known for distilling Old Crow bourbon. George F. Berry followed his father into the distilling industry.

Berry retired and sold his interests in the bourbon industry in 1927. He died in this house in 1938. His wife lived here until 1950. At age 90, she declared she had lived long enough, withdrew to her upstairs bedroom, and died three weeks later. Both are buried at the Frankfort Cemetery in a plot purchased at the time of Bush's death in 1916.

Paul Sawyier, an American impressionist painter, was commissioned by the Berry family to paint scenes the house and surrounding property. He completed 11 paintings of the estate, 6 of which were retained by the family until one was sold to the Kentucky Division of Historic Properties in 2005.

Berry, a bourbon whiskey executive at W.A. Gaines and Company, and his wife both died in the house, in 1938 and 1950 respectively. Their niece, Cornelia Gordon Roberts, inherited the estate until the city of Frankfort acquired it in 1953. The Commonwealth of Kentucky purchased the property in 1957 for a mere $50,000. This included the mansion, carriage house, wash house and approximately 38 acres (150,000 m^{2}). The mansion was used as the State Library until 1982, when the State Libraries and Archives was built.

=== Juniper Hill Park ===
Most of the estate grounds, 194 acres (0.79 km^{2}), were converted into Juniper Hill Park in 1956. The park contains a public golf course, playgrounds, volleyball and tennis courts, pavilion and picnic areas, and horseshoe pits. There are also memorials to Desert Storm, World War II submarine, and Purple Heart veterans, as well as Kentucky's fallen firefighters.

== Architecture ==
=== Exterior ===
William J. Dodd, a prominent Louisville architect, designed the 22 room home in the Colonial Revival style. The stones used in construction were blasted from the property and created the cellar. The building was roofed with green Ludowici-Celadon clay tiles, which were replaced by the same manufacturer in 1992.

The servants' quarters were located in the attic and the "wash house," a laundry structure disconnected from the main house but connected by a covered walkway. The Carriage House sits nearby and provided room for horses, carriages and later automobiles. The home also boasts a veranda, garden and gazebo. Original stone columns are located on the driveway and bear the inscription "Juniper Hill".

=== Interior ===
The home contains an elaborate library, with mahogany woodwork. Also, a large parlor and dining room were used for entertaining. The original tapestries, purchased by Mr. Berry for the mansion, still remain in the mansion library today. Portraits or Mr. and Mrs. Berry by Charles Snead Williams are hung within the mansion. Some original pieces of furniture remain with the mansion today.

One of the highlights of the house, the Music Room was built due to the Berrys passion for music. This addition to the house in 1912 was also designed by architect William J. Dodd.

The music room, containing an impressive pipe organ and carved woodwork, cost approximately $65,000 in 1912. For comparison, this amount was nearly as much as the cost of constructing the Kentucky Governor's Mansion a few years later. According to family memoirs, two woodcarvers – including one from Nuremberg, Germany – spent two years on the oak paneling and Gothic style decorations.

The Music Room featured furnishings with wood carvings to match the Gothic Revival elements of the room. The pipe organ is from Hillgreen-Lane of Alliance, Ohio, and was said to have cost $10,000. Non-operational at this time, estimates to restore the organ near $200,000 or more. A Steinway grand piano, now in a private collection, also added to the elegance of this Music Room.

Mr. Berry engaged Sidney Durst of the Cincinnati Conservatory of Music as his organ instructor. Durst was featured in recitals and midnight dinner parties hosted in this room by the Berrys. Kentucky's social elite attended, dressed in formal finery and were treated to elaborate meals.

The alcove windows featured full-length crimson red brocade draperies with red silk cording, and the hardwood floors were covered with more imported rugs and a full tiger skin. Furniture in the room was arranged as "sitting areas" – making the room less formal and more "conversational."

Images of juniper trees are incorporated into the light sconces and leaded-glass windows.

== Today ==
The "George F. Berry House," as it is sometimes known, was listed on the National Register of Historic Places by the United States Department of the Interior.

The first floor of the mansion is available for guided tours, conferences, receptions and other public events.

The second floor currently houses offices for the Kentucky Division of Historic Properties and the Office of the Inspector General for the Kentucky Transportation Cabinet and is not open to the public.
