= James C. Crow =

- Born: c. 1789; Inverness, Scotland.
- Died: April 20, 1856 (aged 67); Woodford County, Kentucky, U.S.
- Education: Edinburgh University
- Occupation(s): Distiller, Physician
- Years active: circa 1819–1856
- Known for: Perfecting the sour mash method of whiskey making

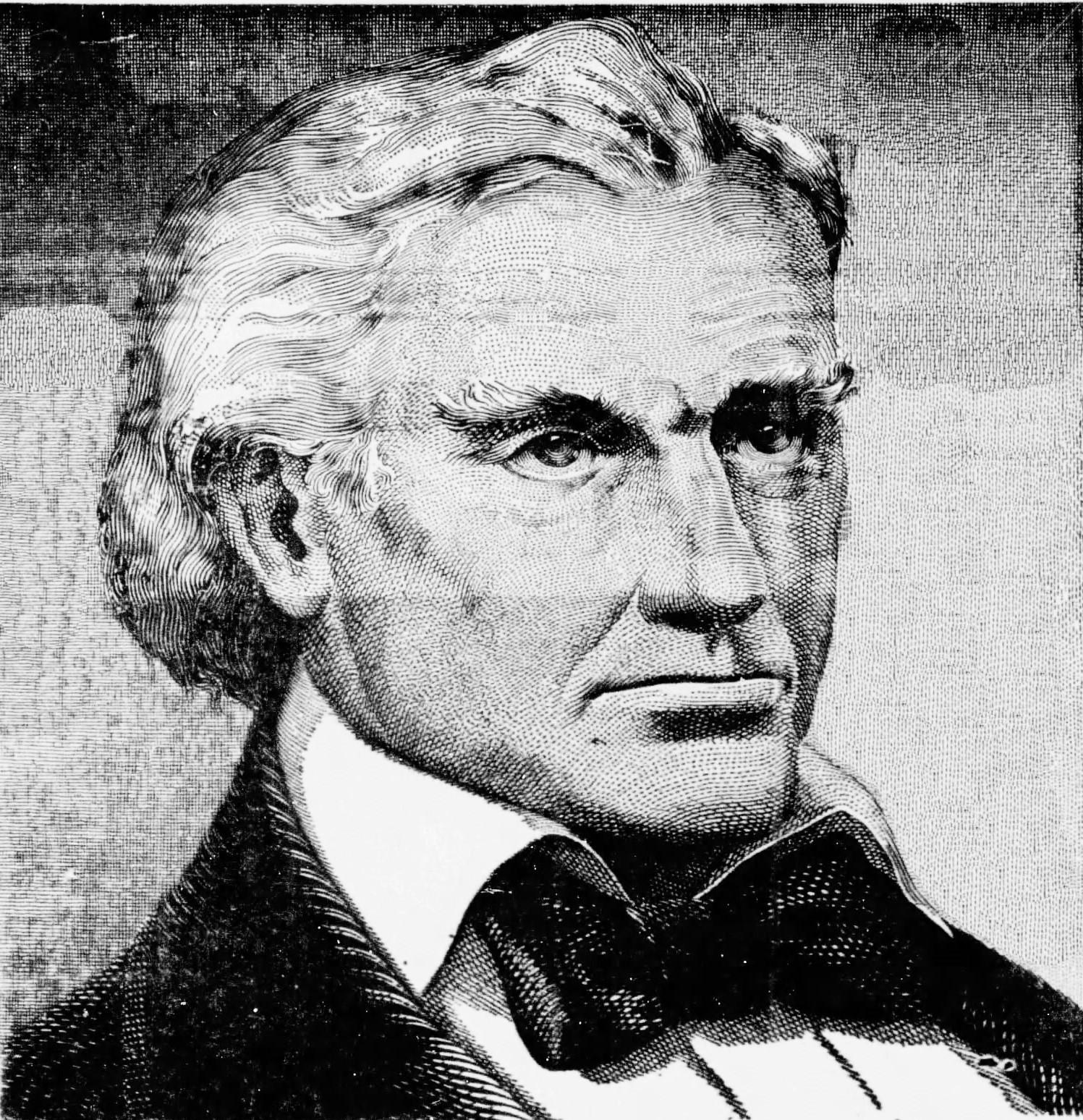
James C. Crow illustrated photo

James C. Crow (c. 1789 – 20 April 1856) is credited for his use of the sour mash process. He is also the namesake of the Old Crow brand of bourbon whiskey currently produced by Suntory Global Spirits.

== Early life ==
Crow, born in Inverness, Scotland, was a chemist-physician, who studied medicine at Edinburgh University. Circa 1814, he immigrated to New York, but shortly relocated to Philadelphia to join his older brother Douglas in his mercantile business there. When the business faltered, he moved from Philadelphia to Kentucky around 1820 and began working as a distiller at the invitation of Willis Field at his Grier's Creek distillery, utilizing his scientific and medical training to experiment and develop his whiskey making process.

== Career ==
Crow worked as a roving distiller, seasonally contracted to small farmer-distillers in Woodford County. In addition to working for Field, Crow allegedly worked as a distiller at Zachariah Henry's farm, where he had recently set up a small still, and later for Henry's children at their own operation. Crow was also briefly employed at the Anderson Johnson Distillery, previously known as Johnson-Yancey distillery, which was established by Burkett G Yancey and his son-in-law Anderson Johnson, and situated along Glenns Creek. The Johnson Distillery became the future site of the Old Taylor Distillery, now known as Castle and Key.

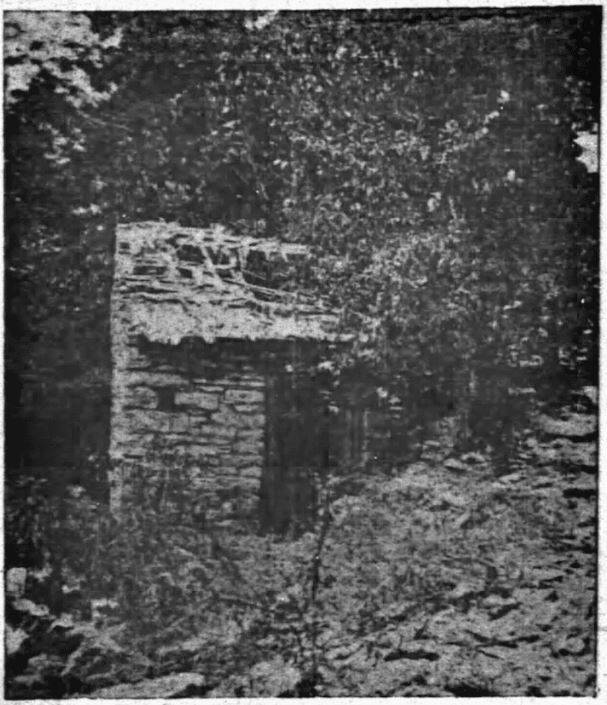
1897 photograph of the remnants of the Field stillhouse where James Crow first worked, on Grier's Creek in Woodford County, Kentucky.

As earlier as 1833, Oscar Pepper's solicited advice from Crow, and he may have assisted or counseled Pepper in distilling operations between the 1833 and 1838 seasons; while Crow worked at other distilleries along Glenn's Creek during the period. The potential for commercial gain represented by Crow's expertise inspired Pepper and Crow to collaborate and upgrade the small log still house on the Pepper farm from a bushel a day to 25-bushel capacity distillery. Crow negotiated his remuneration to be one-eighth of the distillery's annual whiskey production as payment, similar to what millers took as compensation for grinding farmer's grain.

Crow did not rejoin the Pepper distillery until the 1840 season as construction occupied the Glenn's Creek farm site between 1837 and 1838, and a severe drought affected agricultural output from 1838 to 1840. Pepper's substantial capital expenditure involved employing the Irish stonemason, Thomas Mayhall, who constructed a large stone distillery building, stone cisterns, new stone gristmill and warehousing facility from the local limestone. When construction was complete, Crow moved his family to reside in a house two hundred yards above the new Pepper distillery. Crow was assisted by two slaves on the Pepper farm named Dick and Albert, and by William F. Mitchell, who assisted in running the still and to whom Crow imparted his methodologies. HIs whiskey was distributed in different parts of the United States and exported internationally to Canada, Europe and South America.

Crow continued working at the Oscar Pepper Distillery until 1855. He spent the 1855–1856 distilling season dividing his time between the Thomas Edwards, Newt Henry and Anderson Johnson distilleries on Glenn's Creek. Johnson seems to have entertained ambitions to enlarge his distilling business, attracting James Crow to his site by building the Crow family a house near the distillery.

=== Old Crow Brand ===
The Crow brand originated in the 1840s when James Crow marked his one-eighth share of barrels by chalking C-R-O-W on each of his barrel heads. He then scratched over the chalk with an iron hook, C-R-O-W, etching ownership of his whiskey barrels that represented his future income. Whiskey put away for more than three years gained the moniker 'old' whiskey.

In 1866, the firm Gaines, Berry & Company, later known as W.A. Gaines and Co., was formed with the intent to manufacture and sell whiskey. They acquired whatever old stock of Crow's whiskey existed and leased the Pepper Distillery to continue making whiskey by Crow's methodologies, hiring his former assistant William F. Mitchell to be the primary distiller; they registered the trademark Old Crow Whisky in 1870. The company purchased 25 acres from Dr James Bott near Glenns Creek, three miles away in 1868, on this property they constructed the Old Crow Distillery, which was completed in 1870, taking measures to adapt Crow's distillation methods to the different technologies of the new facility.

The W. A. Gaines Co. name, the brand, and the Old Crow Distillery were acquired in 1934 by National Distillers from American Medicinal Spirits Corporation, four months after Prohibition's repeal. They renovated the distillery to restart production later that year. In 1949, National launched an advertising campaign appropriating James Crow and famous deceased historical figures of distinction to endorse Old Crow whiskey, individuals such as Walt Whitman, Mark Twain, Daniel Webster, and Rudyard Kipling.

Old Crow was for many years one of the top selling bourbon nationally, but as whiskey sales began to decline in the 1970s as younger generations had more preference for clear spirits and cocktails, National lowered the proof and maturation time of the whiskey in order to save money. As sales continued to steadily decline into the 1980s, National exited the whiskey business and sold their brands to James B Beam, then a subsidiary of American Brands. Old Crow's production moved to Beam's Clermont distillery and the product became a three year old bourbon based on Beam's mash bill, and the Old Crow Distillery was shut down.

James Crow's whiskey became the bourbon by which all other bourbons were judged, and Old Crow continued to enjoy a reputation as a premium whiskey well into the 20th century, though the Old Crow produced by the Beam Distillery since 1987 is far removed from the original.

== Personal life ==
Crow married his wife Eliza around 1811, and his only daughter, Catharine, was born in 1812; he was residing in Kentucky for approximately twelve years before his wife and daughter arrived to be with him. He was described as having a sturdy build, wide frame, broad forehead and clean shaven, with blue eyes and a sandy complexion. Outside of his distillery work, Crow allegedly would travel miles to practice medicine for those in need without taking a fee. He was a noted conversationalist and well read, with his favorite poet being Robert Burns, and was often called on to entertain guests visiting Versailles.

Crow was purported to have one of the largest personal libraries in Kentucky at that time, covering a wide range of subjects, and possessed a hydrometer and saccharometer among his scientific instruments; he pursued chemistry as a hobby. On April 20, 1856, James Crow suffered a stroke or heart attack in the Anderson stillhouse; he died the same day in the house Johnson had built for the Crow family. Nearly penniless when he died, his family was left in the care of friends. He was buried in Versailles Cemetery.
