= Kinema Theatre =

Former movie theater in Los Angeles, California

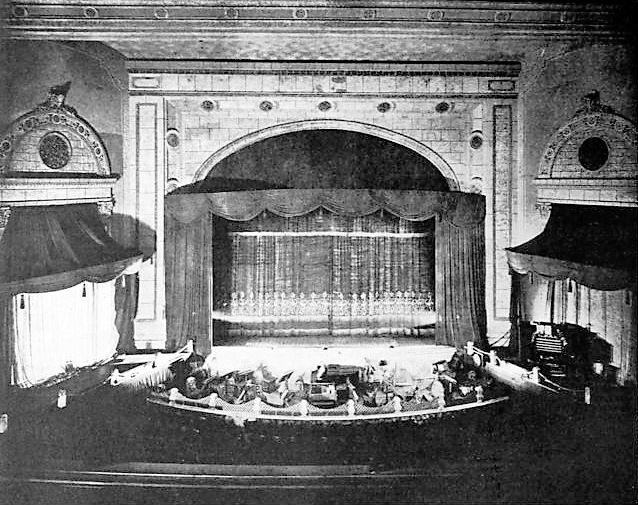
- The theater interior, 1923
- Interactive map of Kinema Theatre
- Address: 640 South Grand Avenue, Los Angeles
- Coordinates: 34.0477°N 118.2561°W
- Capacity: 2,400 at opening, 1,800 after remodel
- Screen: 1

Construction
- Opened: December 15, 1917
- Renovated: 1921, 1923, 1930s
- Demolished: 1941
- Architect: William J. Dodd

Kinema Theatre, later Tally's Kinema, Criterion Theater, Fox Criterion, Tally's Criterion, and Grand International, was a movie theater located at 640 South Grand Avenue in downtown Los Angeles. At one point a top theater in the city, it was demolished in 1941.

== History ==
Kinema Theater was designed by William J. Dodd for Emil Kehrlein. This theater, Kehrlein's third and largest, had a capacity of 2,400 and was considered "one of the most ambitious theaters on the Coast dedicated exclusively to motion pictures." It opened on December 15, 1917 with a screening of The Woman God Forgot and director Cecil B. DeMille in attendance.

In 1919, Thomas Lincoln Tally, owner of Tally's Broadway on nearby Broadway, bought this theater for approx. $650,000 ($12.1 million in 2025) and renamed it Tally's Kinema Theatre. In 1921, the theater underwent a $150,000 ($2.71 million in 2025) remodel.

West Coast Theaters bought the theater in 1923, after which it was gutted, redesigned in a Byzantine Revival style, renamed Criterion Theatre, and reduced in capacity to 1,800. It reopened on September 26, 1923 with the world premiere of Charlie Chaplin's A Woman of Paris. Fox West Coast Theaters took over the theater soon after.

In 1927, the theater hosted the west coast premiere of The Jazz Singer, making it one of the world's first talking picture theaters.

The theater was redesigned again and renamed Grand International in the 1930s. Grand International was considered a benchmark theater in Los Angeles; if a movie failed here, it was expected to fail everywhere.

The theater was demolished in 1941 and replaced by a parking lot.
