= Tally's New Broadway =

Former theater in Los Angeles, California

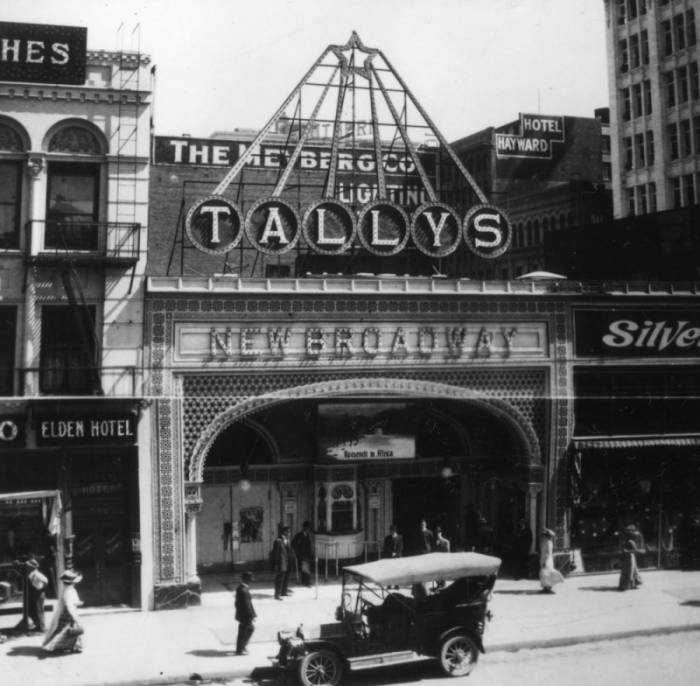
- The building c. 1909
- Interactive map of Tally's New Broadway
- Address: 554 South Broadway, Los Angeles
- Coordinates: 34.0469°N 118.2517°W
- Owner: Alfred Morganstern; Thomas Lincoln Tally
- Capacity: 600 later reduced to 500
- Type: originally vaudeville, later movies
- Screen: 1

Construction
- Opened: December 8, 1903
- Closed: 1909 or 1910
- Demolished: 1910 (theater); 1920 (building)
- Architect: Robert Rowan

Tally's New Broadway, previously Broadway Theatre and Garnet or Garnett Theatre, was a vaudeville and movie theater located at 554 South Broadway, on the corner of 6th and Broadway, in downtown Los Angeles. In 1916, Moving Picture World called it "the first real motion picture theater in Los Angeles."

== History ==
Built by Robert Rowan for San Francisco lawyer Alfred Morganstern, Tally's New Broadway opened as Broadway Theatre on December 8, 1903, one day later than scheduled. The theatre, which housed vaudeville, was the first of eight proposed by Morganstern and upon opening became one of twelve theaters in the Graumann circuit. Its capacity at opening was 600.

In 1905, the theater was renamed Garnet Theatre. Admission was $0.10 ($3.58 in 2025).

Thomas Lincoln Tally became associated with the theater in March 1905 and by 1906, he had bought it and renamed it Tally's New Broadway. Tally began showing motion pictures in the theater and also reduced the theater's capacity to 500, which was still considered "very large."

Tally owned and operated this theater until 1909, at which point he opened Tally's Broadway elsewhere on Broadway. This theater was demolished May 1910, at which point the building was occupied by its neighbor Silverwoods. The building was demolished in 1920.

== Architecture and design ==
Tally's New Broadway was built of staff and featured a Moorish design. Outside, the theater's facade contained hundreds of incandescent lights. Inside, the auditorium was 37 by 55 feet (11 m × 17 m), the stage 37 by 22 feet (11 m × 6.7 m) feet, and there was a 5-foot (1.5 m) pitch on the main floor from the rear to front. The interior was decorated in bright colors.
