= Western Association of Architects =

Defunct professional association of architects

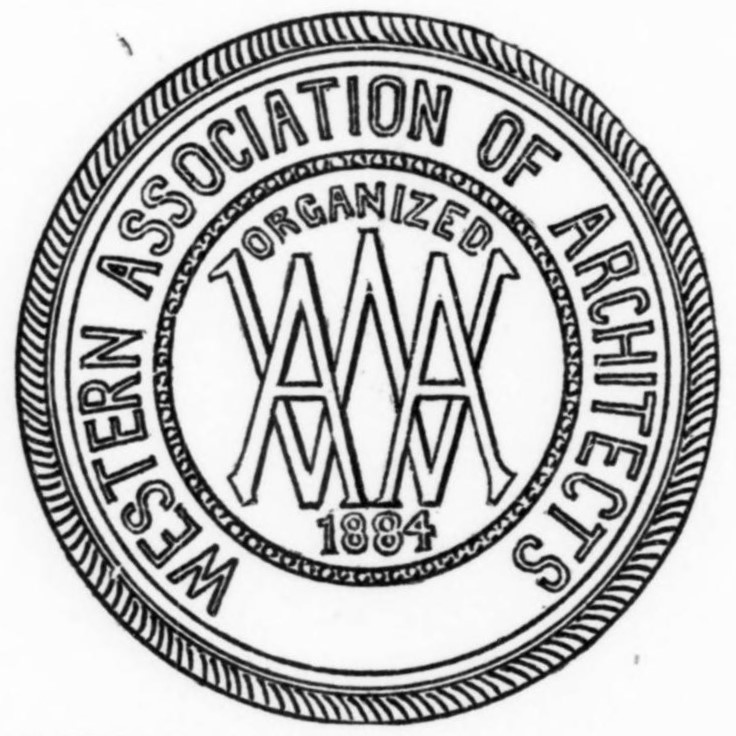
- Abbreviation: WAA
- Merged into: American Institute of Architects
- Formation: 1884; 142 years ago
- Dissolved: 1889; 137 years ago
- Purpose: Architectural profession
- Professional title: FWAA
- Headquarters: Chicago
- Region served: United States

The Western Association of Architects (WAA) was an American professional body founded in Chicago in 1884 separately from the American Institute of Architects (AIA) by John Wellborn Root, Daniel Burnham, Dankmar Adler, and Louis Sullivan, because they felt slighted by East Coast architects of the AIA. "Members consisted of architects from the Midwest and the South with chapters forming in many states. The WAA was the first architectural organization to petition for licensure of architects. Many architects were members of both WAA and AIA...." The WAA merged with the AIA in 1889.

== Presidents ==
- Charles E. Illsley of St. Louis, 1885
- Dankmar Adler of Chicago, 1886
- John W. Root of Chicago, 1887
- Sidney Smith of Omaha, Nebraska, 1888
- W. W. Carlin of Buffalo, New York, 1889

== Other notable members ==
- Louise Blanchard Bethune
- Daniel Burnham
- William J. Dodd
- Gustave W. Drach
- Mason Maury
- Louis Sullivan
- Bernard Vonnegut Sr.
- Oscar C. Wehle
