= Oscar C. Wehle =

Kentucky architect

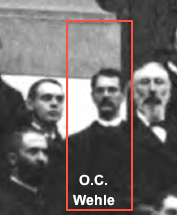
- Oscar C. Wehle in Nov. 1885 at convention of Western Association of Architects in St. Louis.
- Born: 1859; Louisville, Kentucky, U.S.
- Died: 1921 (aged 61–62); Chicago, Illinois, U.S.
- Occupation: Architect

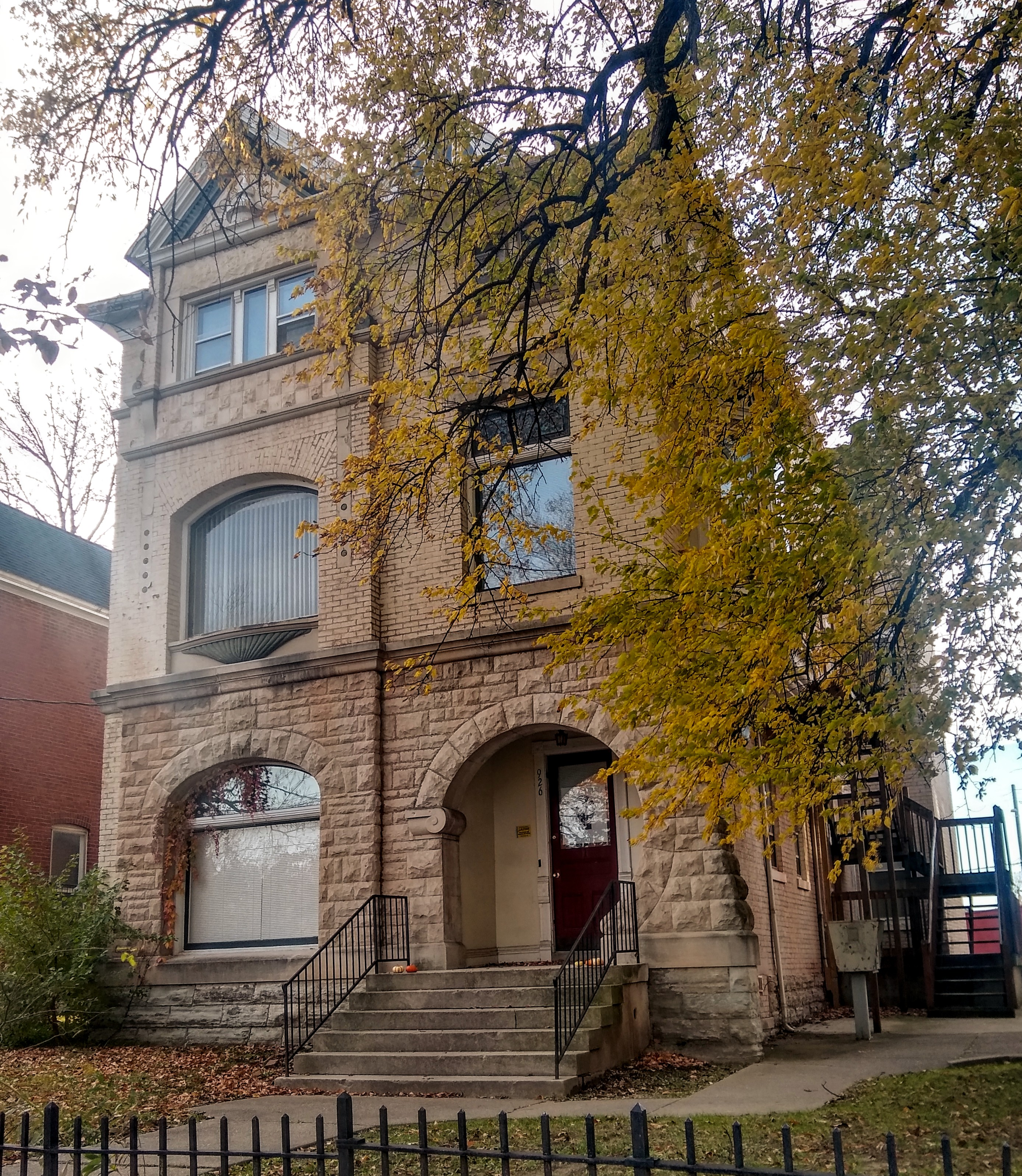
The Louis Seelbach residence, 1888, a.k.a. Seelbach/Parrish house, 900 blk of S. Sixth St. Louisville KY. Wehle & Dodd. Photo by Chroniclerk.

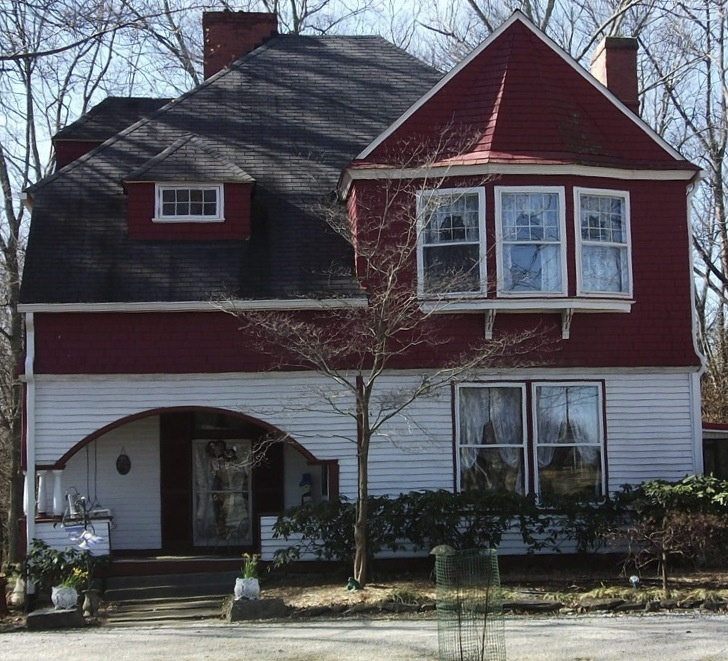
Major L. W. Mckee house, Lawrenceburg, Kentucky. 1886. Wehle & Dodd. Photo by Chroniclerk.

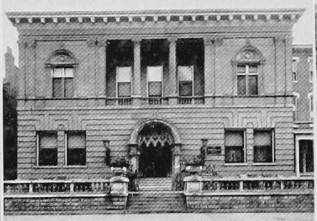
The Standard Club of Louisville. 1885 Wehle. 1887 Wehle & Dodd.

Oscar C. Wehle (1859–1921), also known as O. C. Wehle, was an American architect. He practiced as an architect, or an engineer, primarily in north central Kentucky and in Chicago, Illinois from 1883 to 1905.

== Early life ==
Oscar Charles Wehle was born in Louisville Kentucky ten years after his father Wilhelm Wehle (1809–1881) emigrated to the United States from Prague Bohemia. Wilhelm, later William, was with a party of over twenty kin arriving together at New York City in May 1849, in the wake of the failed Revolutions of 1848 in the Austrian Empire. Several of the Wehle extended family had participated in the Prague insurrection. "The Wehles were one of the aristocratic old Jewish families of Prague [who] took a leading part in the Sabbateans group", a small and short-lived, messianic and reformist offshoot from Judaism at the time. Oscar's grandfather Aaron Beer Wehle (1759–1825) was a leading rabbi of the Prague sect. The Wehles proceeded from New York to the Ohio valley, first settling at Madison IN before moving on to Louisville KY. Oscar's mother, Rosa Tachau (b. 1831, d. 1884), Jewish and 22 years younger than Oscar's father, was born in the Danish/German border region. In her obituary, Rosa is described as "the 'Bread Winner' for a large family." Besides Oscar, there were five other children in the family: Alice, Emma, Bertha, Edwin H. and Ernest C, all born in Kentucky and all but Alice were younger than Oscar. The Wehle children attended the Louisville public schools; however, nothing is known of Oscar's formal education beyond high school.

Also formative in Oscar's youth was the American Civil War (1861–1865), which brought as many as 100,000 Union troops through the city of Louisville Kentucky. A Union army force would remain in Louisville after the war through the end of the same decade and into the early 1870s to recruit and train African American men at the Taylor Barracks (Kentucky) for soldiering out in the western plains. For Oscar, as for most Louisvillians, a military presence would have been a commonplace in city life. Of note, in mid 1861, after a state of insurrection was declared, Oscar's father, Wilhelm, a merchant of wines, liquors, and Hungarian cigars was implicated in the smuggling of contraband (a load of pistols) on the railroad from Cincinnati to Louisville. Wilhelm was identified as being "of the Hebrew fraternity" and having fled on being confronted by authorities.

From age 18 onward, Oscar Wehle identifies and associates himself with available militia culture through enlistment or employment in the Kentucky State Guard, Kentucky Federal Militia, U.S. Army Corps of Engineers, and the U.S. Army regular infantry during the Spanish-American War, this final enlistment seeming especially odd as he was nearly 40 years old in 1898. (Immediately felled by illness, it would be unlikely that he saw action. See Timeline of the Spanish–American War.) As a bachelor and sporting man of his times, Oscar's adult life outlines a preference for the manly world of the military regiment, the outdoor sportsman's life and, as well, homosocial societies like the Young Hebrew Men's Association or YMHA, the German Gymnastic Association or Turners, and The Brotherhood of Commercial Travelers, for example.

== Career ==
In Louisville, except for a brief time as a salesman for C. G. Tachau Co., in 1879, Oscar's career proceeded in a customary fashion. He apprenticed as a draughtsman in the offices of architects C.S. Mergell (1877–1878) and C. A. Curtain (1881), surveyed with the United States Army Corps of Engineers in 1880, and his first employment as an architect was for the L&N Railroad (1882–1884). He had three professional partnerships in Kentucky: with C.S. Mergell (Mergell & Wehle 1884–1885), with William J. Dodd (Wehle & Dodd 1886–1888) and, after a hiatus in his practice because of bad health, with E.M. Camp (Wehle & Camp 1893–1894). He joined the Western Association of Architects in 1885 and the American Institute of Architects in 1890 but resigned from the latter organization five years later, not reinstating active membership after 1895. The historical record is not clear as to whether he maintained licensing, specifically as an architect, after 1895. In Chicago, Wehle worked in the firm of Holabird & Roche (dates not determined) and in the early 19-aughts, he was employed in the firm of Patton & Miller.

Numerous sources from the late 1880s through 1914 cite chronic illness as a burden on Wehle's well-being and career. The nature of the affliction is not identified, but in seeking relief Oscar traveled to the American west and to New York for extended periods, returning to Louisville and Chicago thereafter. Whatever was the underlying condition, it did require hospitalization and medical intervention but it did not significantly shorten his life. He died at age 62, "suddenly, at his place of residence," a boarding house, on Ridgewood Court in Hyde Park Chicago Oct. 27, 1921. His body was not returned to Louisville for burial in the Jewish Cemetery where his family is interred, rather, he was buried in Oak Woods Cemetery in Cook County IL.

== Known work of the brief partnership of Wehle & Dodd ==
- Max Selliger residence (mid 1886), 1022 S. 3rd St. Old Louisville-Limerick Historic District.
- Lewis Witherspoon & Eliza Irwin McKee residence (autumn 1886), 1224 Harrodsburg Rd. Lawrenceburg, KY.
- The Standard Club of Louisville (1887) 500 blk of 5th street. Demolished ca 1915.
- Louis Seelbach residence (1888), also known as Seelbach/Parrish House, 926 S. 6th St. Old Louisville-Limerick Historic District.

== Other designs attributed solely to O. C. Wehle ==
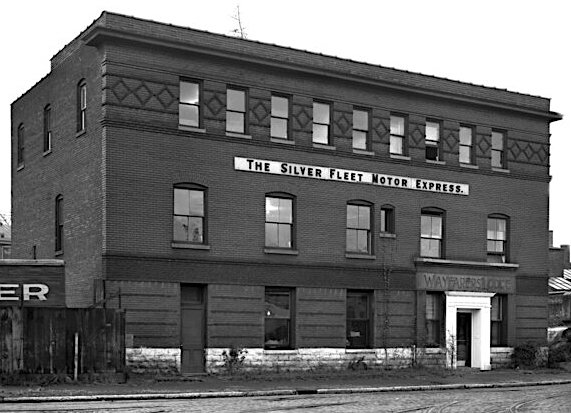
Wayfarers' Lodge, 1894: Wehle designed. Converted to commercial use by 1940 when photo was taken.

- Residence of Capt. D. Pickney "Pink" Varble and Mary F. Varble, circa 1888, 1423 Everett Avenue, Louisville, Kentucky. Demolished.
- Wayfarers' Lodge, 1894, at Floyd, Linden (now A. Flexner Way) and Walnut (now Muhammad Ali Blvd.) streets, Louisville, Kentucky. Demolished circa 1962 for I-65 expressway corridor.
- Country "farm" home of Alfred Brandeis & Frederica Dembitz Brandeis, circa 1898, Ladless Hill, Jefferson County, Kentucky; "a relatively modest clapboard home at the edge of the bluff, [with] a broad porch offering sweeping views of the Ohio River beyond". This "large cottage" burned in 1909.
