= Ralph Hamlin =

American cyclist

Personal information
- Full name: Ralph Cunningham Hamlin
- Born: 17 October 1880 San Francisco
- Died: 5 July 1974 (aged 93) Los Angeles

Cycling career
- Sport: Cycling
- Disciplines: Road, track
- Role: Rider

Major wins
- 1898 - Santa Monica Road Race (time prize), 1912 - Los Angeles to Phoenix Automobile Road Race (new record time)

Ralph Cunningham Hamlin (1880 – 1974) was an American bicycle and car racer and later a prominent L.A. car dealer. Hamlin was born in San Francisco in 1880 and moved to Los Angeles with his family when he was 6 years old.

== Racing career ==
Hamlin started racing bicycles at 16 and quickly showed his talent. In 1997 he set the third fastest time in the prestigious Santa Monica Road Race from downtown L.A. to Santa Monica, and one year later he won the fastest time prize. From bicycles he transitioned into racing motorcycles and then automobiles; in 1912 Hamlin, in a Franklin air-cooled Automobile, won the Los Angeles to Phoenix Road Race, establishing a new record, in 18 hours and 20 minutes.

== Car dealership ==
With his first winnings as a cyclist Hamlin established a bicycle repair shop. In 1901, he upgraded his business and began selling motorcycles, Orient Buckboards, Lozier, and Scripps-Booth automobiles. Four years later, Hamlin became the Southern California distributor for Franklin air-cooled cars. He would go on to become one of the most successful Franklin dealers in the United States with outlets in Hollywood, Pasadena, Glendale, and San Diego. Testament of his prominent status within Los Angeles' society at the time is his membership of The Uplifters social club.

== Palmarès ==
1897
3rd, Santa Monica Road Race
1898
1st, Santa Monica Road Race
1912
1st, Los Angeles to Phoenix Automobile Road Race
