= The Uplifters (club) =

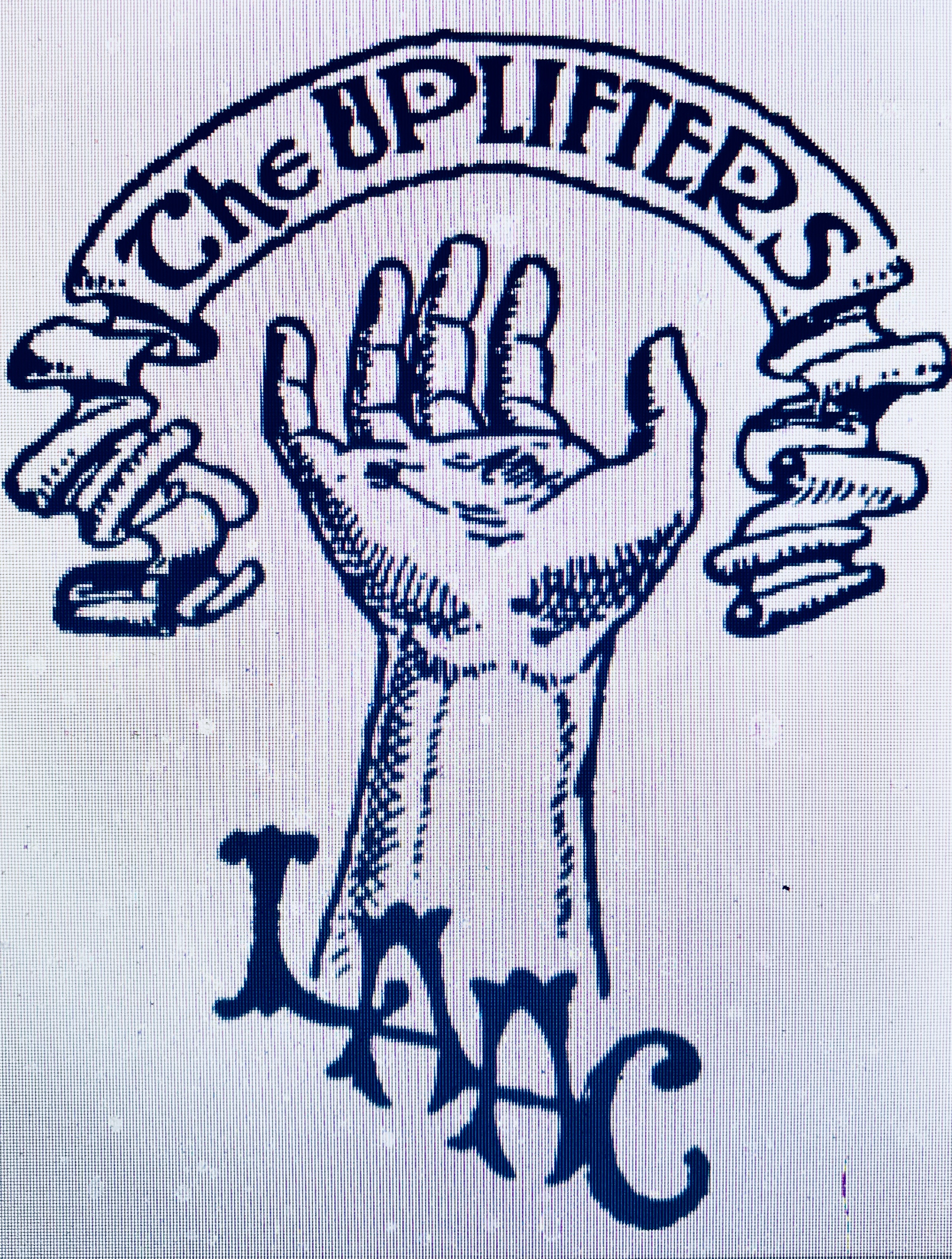
The official logo of The Uplifters, designed by L. Frank Baum for The Los Angeles Athletic Club

The Lofty and Exalted Order of Uplifters or simply The Uplifters is an invitation-only social club at the Los Angeles Athletic Club founded by Harry Marston Haldeman in 1913. The club is still in existence today.

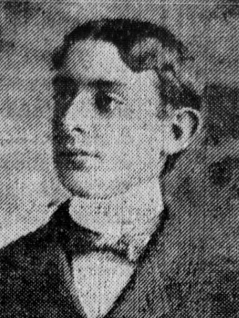
Marco H. Hellman

Haldeman, originally from Chicago, was a plumbing magnate and grandfather of Watergate conspirator, H.R. Haldeman. Upon his arrival in Los Angeles, he sought to create a men's club similar to his Chicago club, The Bugs . Its membership included Marco H. Hellman, Sim W. Crabill, Ralph Hamlin, Herman Paine, Sr., Ernest R. Ball, Byron Gay, Will Rogers, Walt Disney, Spencer Tracy, Clark Gable, Busby Berkeley, Leo Carrillo, Harold Lloyd, Darryl F. Zanuck, Ferde Grofé, Eugene Biscailuz, Hays Rice, Clarence R. Rundel, Sol Lesser, Louis F. Gottschalk, William J. Dodd, and L. Frank Baum. Baum created the group's name, wrote its anthem, "Haldeman," and scripted most of their amateur theatricals until his death, several of which were revived posthumously.

In its initial stage, the Uplifters met regularly at The Los Angeles Athletic Club after construction on the 12-story clubhouse finished in 1912. They also held an infamous annual party, called the Hijinx, first in Los Angeles and later in both Lake Arrowhead and Del Mar. The men-only affair featured heavy drinking, the staging of lewd plays and outdoor sports including polo and shooting.

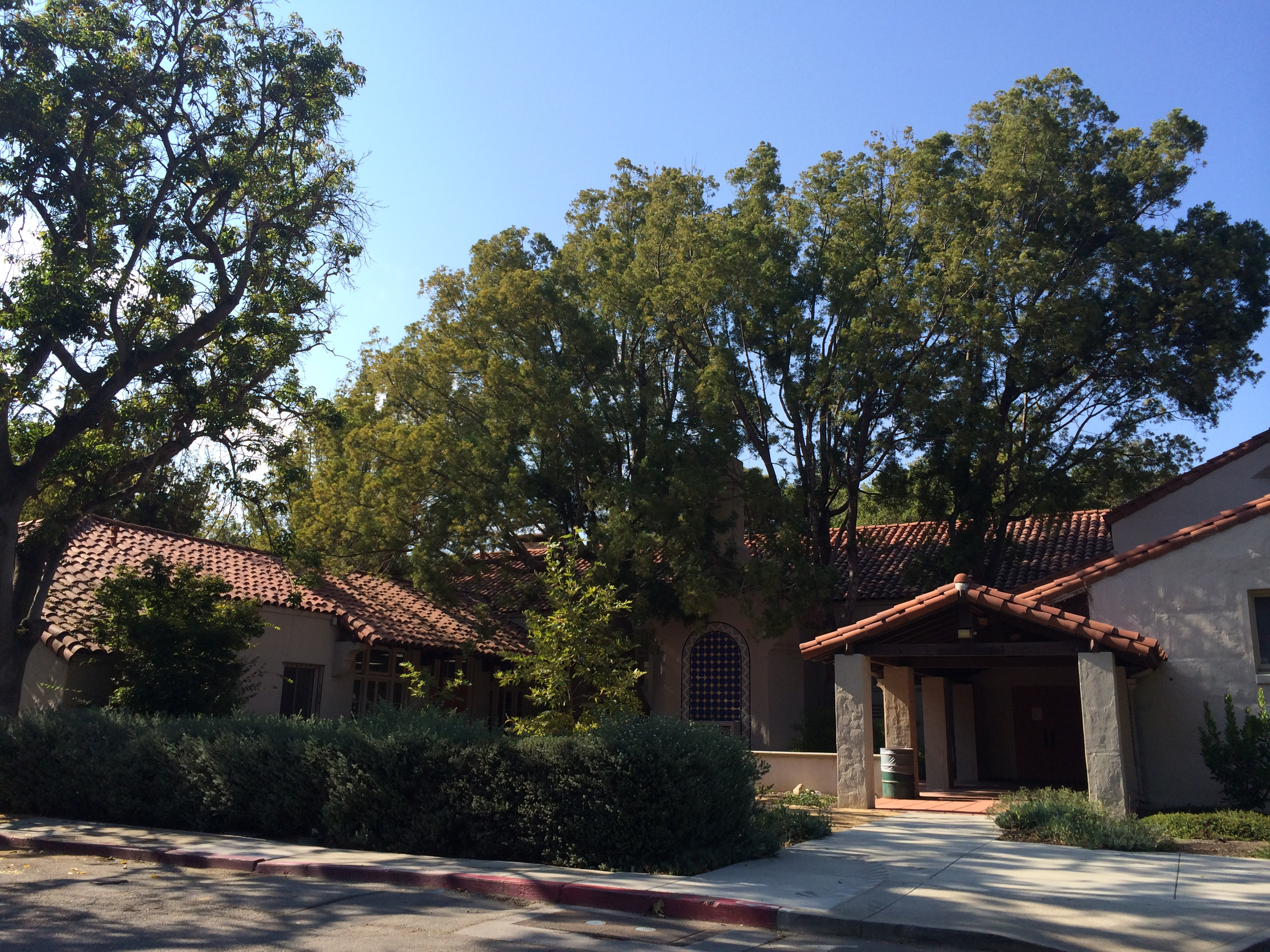
Rustic Canyon Recreation Center, formerly the Uplifters Clubhouse, in Rustic Canyon, Los Angeles.

Eventually the group moved out of the Los Angeles Athletic Club to avoid the scrutiny of prohibition, purchasing a ranch in 1920 near what is now Will Rogers State Historic Park. The ranch encompassed 120 acres and included a Spanish Colonial-style clubhouse with tennis courts, a swimming pool, trap shooting range, amphitheater and dormitories. Club members were invited to build their own getaway cottages on land leased from the club, provided they adhere to strict building guidelines.

The Uplifters, long dormant, now meets regularly at The Los Angeles Athletic Club. Once an all male group, it is now run by two women. The club continues to uphold their founding motto - "To Uplift Art and Promote Goodfellowship," - while also promoting a contemporary spirit of inclusivity, and outward-facing engagement with the DTLA community.

Contemporary Uplifter meetings follow the same structure and procedures set by the original membership, led by the "Board of Excelsiors" which includes a Grand Muscle (President), Elevator (Vice President), Lord High Raiser (Treasurer) and Royal Hoister (Secretary), positions and titles first devised by Baum himself.

== High Jinks (Amateur Theatricals) of L. Frank Baum ==
These shows continued to be performed well into the 1920s. Their earliest date for performance, if known, is stated below. Lyrics from many of the songs were published in Alla T. Ford's The High-Jinks of L. Frank Baum (which was available either as a two-page pamphlet (100 copies) or a miniature book (500 copies). The songs included were from the 1938 Silver Anniversary edition of The Uplifters' Hymnal. Also included are the tongue-in-cheek by-laws (board executives are the Grand Muscle, the Elevator, the Royal Hoister, the Lord High Raiser, and the Board of Excelsiors), also written by Baum, and a list of every man who attended the first meeting.

The Uplift of Lucifer was published privately in 1963 by Manuel Weltman's Wagon and Star Press, with The Corrugated Giant and historical information. He sold the books at-cost over concerns of copyright, and they have since become prized collectibles. The other plays remain, aside from the aforementioned lyrics, unpublished.

- Stagecraft, or, The Adventures of a Strictly Moral Man (14 January 1914; Music by Louis F. Gottschalk)
- High Jinks (24 October 1914; Music by Louis F. Gottschalk)
- The Corrugated Giant (1915)
- The Uplift of Lucifer, or Raising Hell: An Allegorical Squazosh (23 October 1915; Music by Louis F. Gottschalk)
- The Birth of the New Year (31 December 1915)
- Blackbird Cottages (28 October 1916; Music by Louis F. Gottschalk) (minstrel show)
- Snow White (1916; Composer Unknown)
- The Uplifters' Minstrels (1916; Music by Byron Gay)
- The Orpheus Road Show: A Paraphrastic Compendium of Mirth (1917; Music by Louis F. Gottschalk)

The songs that made it into the Hymnal are "Never Strike Your Father, Boy" from The Orpheus Road Show; "We're Having a Hell of a Time" from The Uplift of Lucifer, "Susan Doozan," from The Uplifters' Minstrels, and "Apple Pie" (a song parody).

== Current Officers ==
The Grand Muscle: Jennie Taylor Tucker + Suzanne Zoe Joskow

The Elevator: Carl Winston Owens II

The Royal Hoister: Artem Timofeev + Field James Garthwaite

The Lord High Raiser: Christopher André Hooks
