= James Dixon Williams =

American film producer

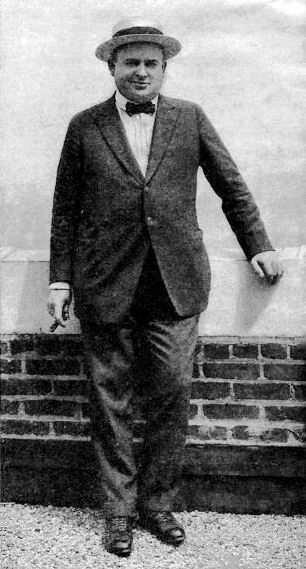
- Williams in 1921
- Born: February 27, 1877; Ceredo, West Virginia, United States
- Died: August 28, 1934 (aged 57); Manhattan State Hospital; Manhattan, New York City, United States
- Occupations: Film producer, studio executive
- Spouse: Ethel Hope (m. 1916)

James Dixon Williams (February 27, 1877 – August 28, 1934) was an early American film producer and studio executive. He was a founder of First National Pictures and British National Pictures.

== Biography ==
Williams was born in Ceredo, West Virginia to Harriett and O. H. Williams.

He worked in live theater, selling tickets and later playing the house organ. He then worked as a traveling picture showman. From around 1897 until 1908 he toured with his show across the United States, ending up in Spokane, Seattle, and Vancouver.

He went to Australia in 1909, and in 1912 opened Luna Park in Melbourne—illuminated by 15,000 electric lights and drawing 22,300 people on its first night. Live entertainment was the main attraction, including high wire artists, trick cyclists, and unicyclists. Williams is also credited with introducing motion pictures on a national scale in Australia. In 1916 he married Ethel Hope.

He returned to the United States and in 1917, founded First National Pictures with Thomas L. Tally. It began as an association of exhibitors led by Williams, and soon expanded into film distribution and production, becoming a major force in the film industry. Williams signed Charlie Chaplin to the first $1 million contract in film history, and launched the careers of independent producers, including Louis B. Mayer.

In 1924, Williams formed the Ritz Carlton Pictures, Inc., of which Rudolph Valentino was the first star signed.

In 1927, Williams founded British National Pictures in London. He built its first studio at Elstree before leaving British National in 1928 and filing suit against his former partners. In the course of a contentious trial the company compromised, making a substantial payment to Williams and agreeing to clear his name. Mr. Justice Horridge stated his hope that the trial would not impair Williams "in the exercise of those abilities which during the course of the trial it had become certain he possessed."

Williams died at age 57 in Manhattan State Hospital, following a nervous breakdown. Variety described him as having been "one of the leaders of the motion picture industry, and for years a dominant factor … He is probably the only operator ever to have established major companies on three continents, all of them still going concerns. And yet it is to be presumed that it was financial worries that brought about his breakdown."
