= Tally's Electric Theater =

Former movie theater in Los Angeles, California

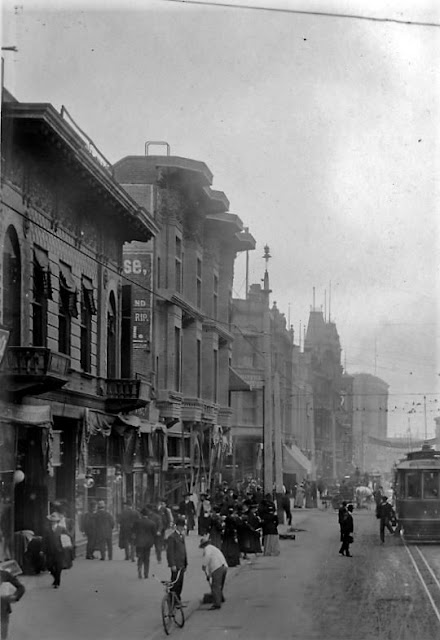
- The theater (second building from left) in 1906
- Interactive map of Tally's Electric Theater
- Address: 262 South Main Street, Los Angeles, California
- Coordinates: 34.04970°N 118.2456°W
- Screen: 1

Construction
- Opened: April 17, 1902
- Architect: Morgan & Walls

Tally's Electric Theater, also known as Lyric Theatre and Glockner's Automatic Theatre, was a movie theater located at 262 South Main Street in downtown Los Angeles. Opened in 1902, it was likely the world's first permanent theater specifically designed for the exhibition of movies.

== History ==
Thomas L. Tally opened Tally's Electric Theater opened on April 17, 1902, making it likely the world's first permanent theater specifically designed for movies. The theater originally screened an hour's worth of material, including films such as Capture of the Biddle Brothers and New York City in a Blizzard, for $0.10 ($3.72 in 2025). Following the theater's opening night success, it began showing child matinées at half-price admission the following day.

In June 1903, the theater was renamed Lyric Theatre and started hosting vaudeville in addition to movies. The Great Train Robbery also screened at the theater that year, and the film was so successful, it inspired Tally to sell the theater in order to travel with and exhibit the film.

In 1910, the theater was advertised as Glockner’s Automatic Theatre.

According to the memory of a local businessman, the theater was demolished before the advent of talking pictures, however the building housing the theater was not demolished until at least 1998.

== Architecture ==
Tally's Electric Theater was designed by Morgan & Walls and built of brick.
