= Thomas Lincoln Tally =

American theater owner and film producer (1861–1945)

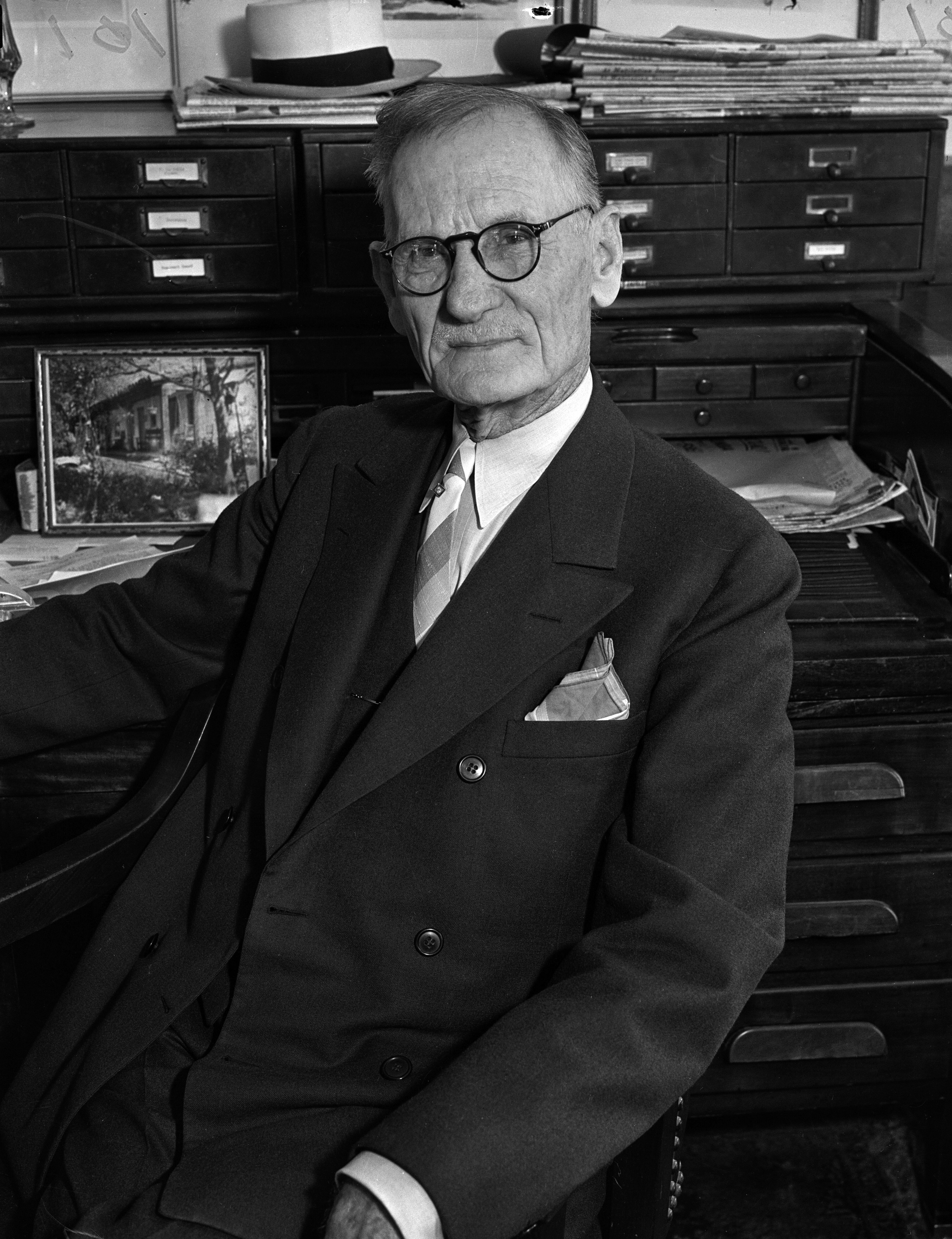
- Tally in 1935
- Born: July 6, 1861; Goliad, Texas, U.S.
- Died: November 22, 1945 (aged 84); Beverly Hills, California, U.S.
- Resting place: Inglewood, California, U.S.
- Occupations: Motion picture theater proprietor, film producer
- Spouse: Mary Ann (Seymour) Tally
- Children: 1

Thomas Lincoln Tally (July 6, 1861 – November 22, 1945) was an American motion picture theater proprietor and film producer. In 1916, Moving Picture World wrote that Tally was "the pioneer exhibitor of Los Angeles and one of the pioneers of [the United States]." Tally was also credited with coining the term moving picture.

== Early life ==
Thomas Lincoln Tally was born in Goliad, Texas, on July 6, 1861, to cattle ranchers.

Before Tally's involvement in motion pictures, he worked as a cowboy, typesetter, and hardware salesman.

== Motion pictures ==
Tally's career in motion pictures began when he obtained rights for Edison phonograph sales in Texas. In 1895 or April 1897, he opened a phonograph and kinetoscope parlor at 311 South Spring Street in downtown Los Angeles, the first of its kind on the Pacific coast. Admission was $0.10 ($3.87 in 2025). Tally moved to his second location at First and Spring in 1898.

Tally opened Tally's Electric Theater, likely the world's first permanent theatre specifically designed for movies, in Los Angeles, California on April 17, 1902. In 1903, The Great Train Robbery was so successful in this theater that Tally sold the theater in order to travel with and exhibit the film.

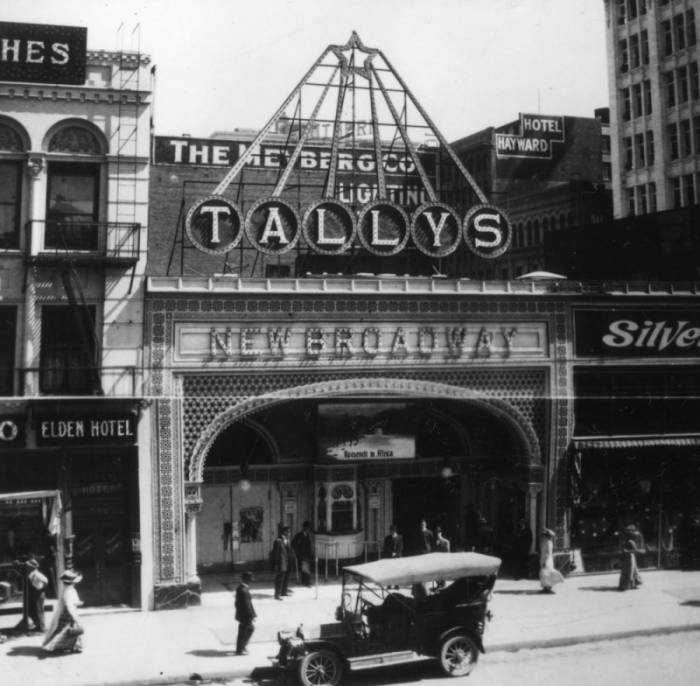
Tally's New Broadway, c. 1909

Tally became associated with Broadway Theatre in March 1905 and by 1906, he had bought it, renamed it Tally's New Broadway, and used it to screen movies. Tally claimed that this theater was where "the first craze on motion pictures started and people used to be lined up for a block or more to get into the theater." Tally owned the theater until 1909 and in 1916, Moving Picture World called this theater "the first real motion picture theater in Los Angeles."

Tally opened Tally's Broadway on May 2, 1910. With this theater, Tally became the first person ever to have an organ installed in a movie theater and he also built the United States's and possibly world's first disappearing orchestra pit. In 1912, Tally used this theater to become the first proprietor to show color film in Los Angeles and in 1915, this theater was said to contain the largest theater organ in the world.

Tally co-founded First National Pictures with James Dixon Williams in 1917, Tally's idea being that a conglomerate of theaters could buy or produce and distribute its own films. By 1919, the organization had 5,000 independent theater owners as members, and the organization was also the first to sign Charlie Chaplin to a million-dollar contract. The organization produced and/or distributed hundreds of films, including The Kid, The Sea Hawk, The Lost World, and others.

In 1919, Tally bought Kinema Theatre for approx. $650,000 ($12.1 million in 2025) and renamed it Tally's Kinema Theatre.

=== List of theaters owned by Tally ===
- Projection parlor at 311 South Spring Street, Los Angeles (1895 or April 1897—1898)
- Theater at First and Main, Los Angeles (1898—unknown)
- Tally's Electric (1902—1903)
- Tally's New Broadway (1905—1909)
- Tally's Broadway (1910—1920s or earlier)
- College Theatre (1912—1920s or earlier)
- Tally's Kinema (1919—early 1920s)

== Personal life and death ==
Tally married Mary Ann Seymour in Aransas, Texas on May 18, 1885, and in 1889, she gave birth to their only child Seymour.

Tally died in Beverly Hills on November 22, 1945. He was buried in Inglewood.

== Lawsuits ==
- Tally v. Ganahl, 151 California Supreme Court 418 (1907)

== See also ==
- List of people from Los Angeles
