= William J. Dodd =

American architect and designer

William James Dodd
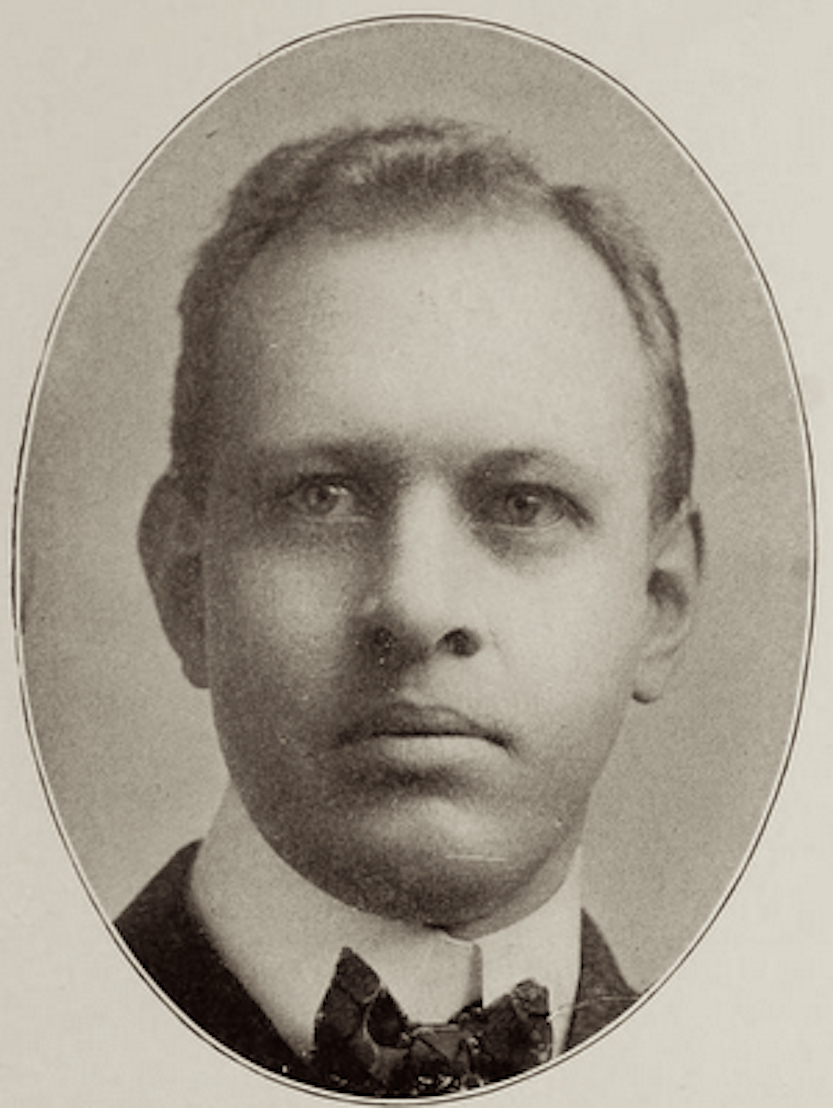
- Dodd, circa 1900
- Born: September 22, 1862; Quebec City, Quebec, Canada
- Died: June 16, 1930 (aged 67); Los Angeles, California, U.S.
- Occupation: Architect
- Spouse: Ione Estes (m. Nov. 27, 1889)
- Children: none

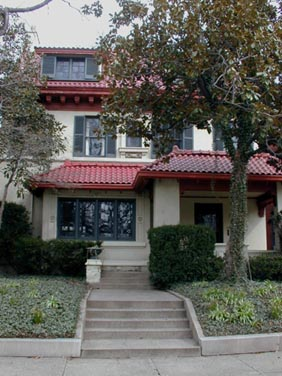
T. Hoyt Gamble House. Old Louisville Historic District. One of Dodd's final Louisville residential designs from 1912.

William James Dodd (1862–1930) was an American architect and designer who worked mainly in Louisville, Kentucky from 1886 through the end of 1912 and in Los Angeles, California from early 1913 until his death. Dodd rose from the so-called First Chicago School of architecture, though of greater influence for his mature designs was the classical aesthetic of the Beaux-Arts style ascendant after the Chicago World's Columbian Exposition of 1893. His design work also included functional and decorative architectural glass and ceramics, furniture, home appliances, and literary illustration.

In a prodigious career lasting more than 40 years, Dodd left many structures that are still standing on both east and west coasts and in the midwest and upper south of the United States, among the best known of these being the original Presbyterian Seminary campus (now Jefferson Community & Technical College), the Weissinger-Gaulbert Apartments, and the old YMCA building, all three in downtown Louisville facing Broadway. Also notable are his numerous residential and ecclesiastical designs, restored and in continuous use in Kentucky and Tennessee. In California, examples of his extant work include the Pacific Center and Hearst's Los Angeles Herald-Examiner Building in downtown Los Angeles and the San Gabriel Mission Playhouse south of Pasadena as well as residences across Los Angeles, in the Pacific Palisades, in Altadena and more distantly in Palm Springs. Some of the earliest attributed and oldest designs of his career may be found in Hyde Park, Chicago.

== Early years ==
Dodd's earliest identified design: a cottage for W. I. Beman on Blackstone Ave. Hyde Park, Chicago. 1886. Click on picture to enlarge.

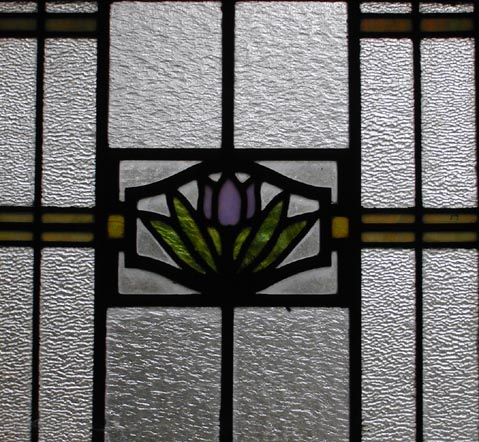
Art glass window with tulip-lotus on water motif. T. Hoyt Gamble House, Louisville, KY (1912)

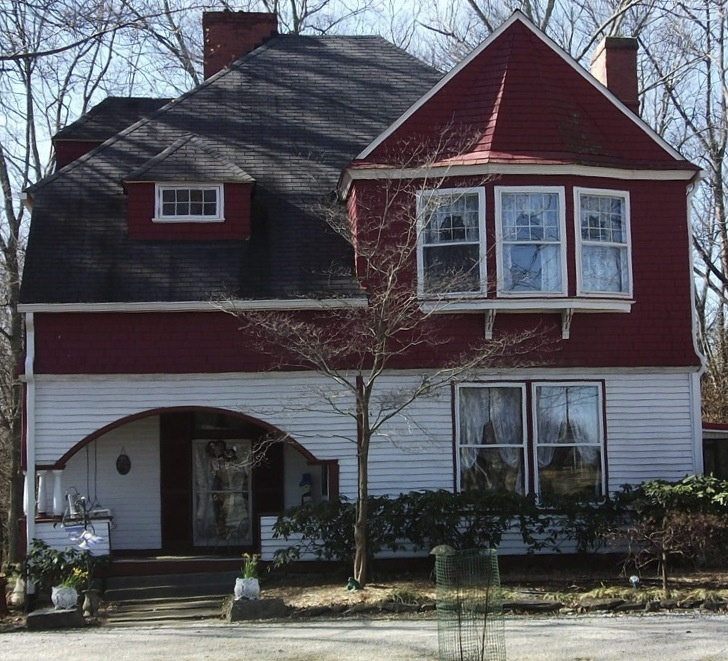
Major L. W. Mckee house, Lawrenceburg, Kentucky. One of Dodd's first residential designs in Kentucky, 1886. Click on picture to enlarge.

William J. Dodd was born in Quebec City, Canada, in 1862. Prior to emigrating from Canada to the United States and Chicago Illinois, William's English/Welsh father, Edward, was an inn keeper and before that a wharfinger, and his Irish mother, Mary Dinning, was a school teacher and dressmaker. In 1869, the family of six, then including daughters Jane (Jenny) Dinning and Elizabeth Ann (Lizzie), and sons Edward Jr. and William James, moved to Chicago. The 1870 Chicago Directory gives the first known address for the Dodds on south Des Plaines near the original site of the Old St. Patrick's Church. In 1871, the ill-timed move of the Dodd household to West Harrison Street in Ward 9 placed them in the path of the Great Chicago Fire during October of the same year.

Dodd received his earliest training in drawing and design, starting around age 15, in the office studio of Chicago architect William Le Baron Jenney, c. 1877–1879. His first professional employment appears to be from 1880 into mid 1883 for the Pullman Car Company as a draftsman of architect Solon Spencer Beman's designs for the planned city of Pullman, Illinois now the Pullman National Monument. Dodd's social life in Pullman was marked with athletic participation on the first Pullman competitive rowing crew. As a member of the Pullman Rowing Club and the Pullman Pleasure Club he was often mentioned in the press accounts of fetes and dance parties that he coordinated for the young elites of Pullman and Hyde Park. This sporting sociability is not merely incidental to Dodd but returns as an important feature of his later life in Louisville, with his membership in the Pendennis Club and Louisville Country Club, and in Los Angeles with his co-founding of The Uplifters Club, an offshoot of the Los Angeles Athletic Club.

In November 1889, William married Ione Estes of Memphis, TN. The marriage produced no children. Ione was from a large family of some political and historical importance in post-Reconstruction era Tennessee and in the Upland South region. It is not yet determined what was the religious practice, if any, of William and Ione after marriage. Ione was Presbyterian, and their marriage was officiated by a Presbyterian minister. William was christened in the Methodist Church, the religious denomination of his mother.

There are still many uncertainties in Dodd's biography. Although naturalized in 1869 upon entering the United States, from the 1890s onward Dodd identifies as Chicago-born, doing so, Jay Gatsby-like, in all kinds of public documents. In an 1897 interview with a reporter for the newspaper Louisville Courier-Journal W. J. Dodd left the reporter, and thus posterity, with the impression that he was a native Chicagoan, that he graduated from "the Chicago schools" and had been in the first graduating class of the Chicago Art Institute. The archives of the Institute do not yet support this claim. Similarly unclear is precisely when Dodd began his professional practice in Louisville. The year usually offered in the histories of Kentucky architects (from Withey to Hedgepeth, to Kleber, to Luhan, Domer and Mohney) for Dodd's arrival in Louisville is 1884, based upon the aforementioned 1897 Courier-Journal article. In contrast, around this same time, Inland Architect tracks Dodd taking employment as an architect with the Northern Pacific Railway upon recommendation by S. S. Beman and moving to the rail company's office in Portland Oregon only to return to Chicago (Hyde Park) and employment with the Beman brothers (S. S. and W. I.) by the end of 1885 after the collapse of the Northern Pacific's leadership and its reorganization. Contrary to what was reported in the previously cited 1897 newspaper interview, there is yet no evidence that Dodd was ever employed by McKim, Mead and White in New York; however, if the employment happened it may have been related to Dodd's brief time in Portland and plans by the Railway to build the Portland Union Station. The journal Inland Architect of February 1886 announced Dodd's imminent departure from Chicago to begin a partnership with Oscar C. Wehle of Louisville, saying: "Mr Dodd will [soon] be a valuable addition to the architects of Louisville". By September 1886 Dodd is cited as partner with Oscar Wehle for the design of "a magnificent three story brown stone residence" in Louisville. In November 1886, Dodd was elected to membership in the Western Association of Architects, or WAA, his home city being given as Louisville. Dodd first appears as a resident, a boarder, in Louisville in the 1887 Caron's Louisville Directory, and in February of same year, a trade journal cites "Wehle & Dodd, architects, of Louisville." In December 1887, the Courier-Journal newspaper gives the partnership office in Louisville as "s.e. cor. Fifth and Main"

== Career ==
The John P. Starks House, c. 1898, designed by W. J. Dodd & Arthur Cobb in Old Louisville's St. James Court.

Dodd spent nearly 27 years in Louisville. During this time his professional partners were Oscar C. Wehle, Mason Maury (1889–1896), Arthur Cobb, and Kenneth McDonald. Also, Dodd's output from these years contained many free-lance projects, and in at least one case Dodd teamed with Ohio architect Frank Mills Andrews. He worked throughout Kentucky and across the midwest, specifically Illinois, Indiana, and Tennessee, creating structures of exceptional craftsmanship and high style, designs which traced the transitional tastes and technologies of the period leading up to Modernism. On the east coast, extant Dodd structures from the early 1890s can be found in Virginia, in the historic Ghent (Norfolk) neighborhood.

On Christmas Day 1912 Dodd departed the midwest to continue his profession in the greater Los Angeles area, a period lasting until his death there in June 1930. Upon arrival in Los Angeles, Dodd immediately partnered with J. Martyn Haenke (1877–1963), but only briefly, through October 1913. After a year of free lance, Dodd teamed with William Richards (1871–1945), his longest professional partnership, from 1915 until his death.

In southern California, "the Southland", Dodd's buildings are to be found in the old downtown financial district around Pacific Center, above Hollywood in Laughlin Park and Hancock Park, to the west in Rustic Canyon, Playa Del Rey and Long Beach, southeast to San Gabriel, and northeast in Altadena. Related to Dodd's Los Angeles work are residences in Oak Glen and Palm Springs, California.

From as early as 1893, and to the end of his life, Dodd was a mentor to younger designers who were new to the profession at the time. Some designers she mentored included Lloyd Wright, Thomas Chalmers Vint, Wesley Eager, and Adrian Wilson, often outsiders without a developed practice and contending with a new client base and fast evolving licensing standards in cities enjoying rapid expansion as was Louisville after the American Civil War and Los Angeles after World War I. The architect Julia Morgan, a mostly free-lance upstate California designer from San Francisco, rare as a female in a male-dominated profession, formed a team with W. J. Dodd and J. M. Haenke as her LA facilitators and design partners for William Randolph Hearst's Los Angeles Herald-Examiner Building, a landmark downtown Los Angeles project completed in 1915.

William Dodd's design work extended to glass and ceramics. His designs of Teco pottery are among the most sought-after and rare of the Arts and Crafts movement products introduced by the Gates Potteries near Chicago Illinois. He also designed furniture and art glass windows for many of his best residential and commercial buildings; examples of such work by Dodd are to be seen in the Ferguson Mansion, currently the Filson Historical Society, and the T. Hoyt Gamble house, both of Louisville.

== Civic and cultural involvement ==
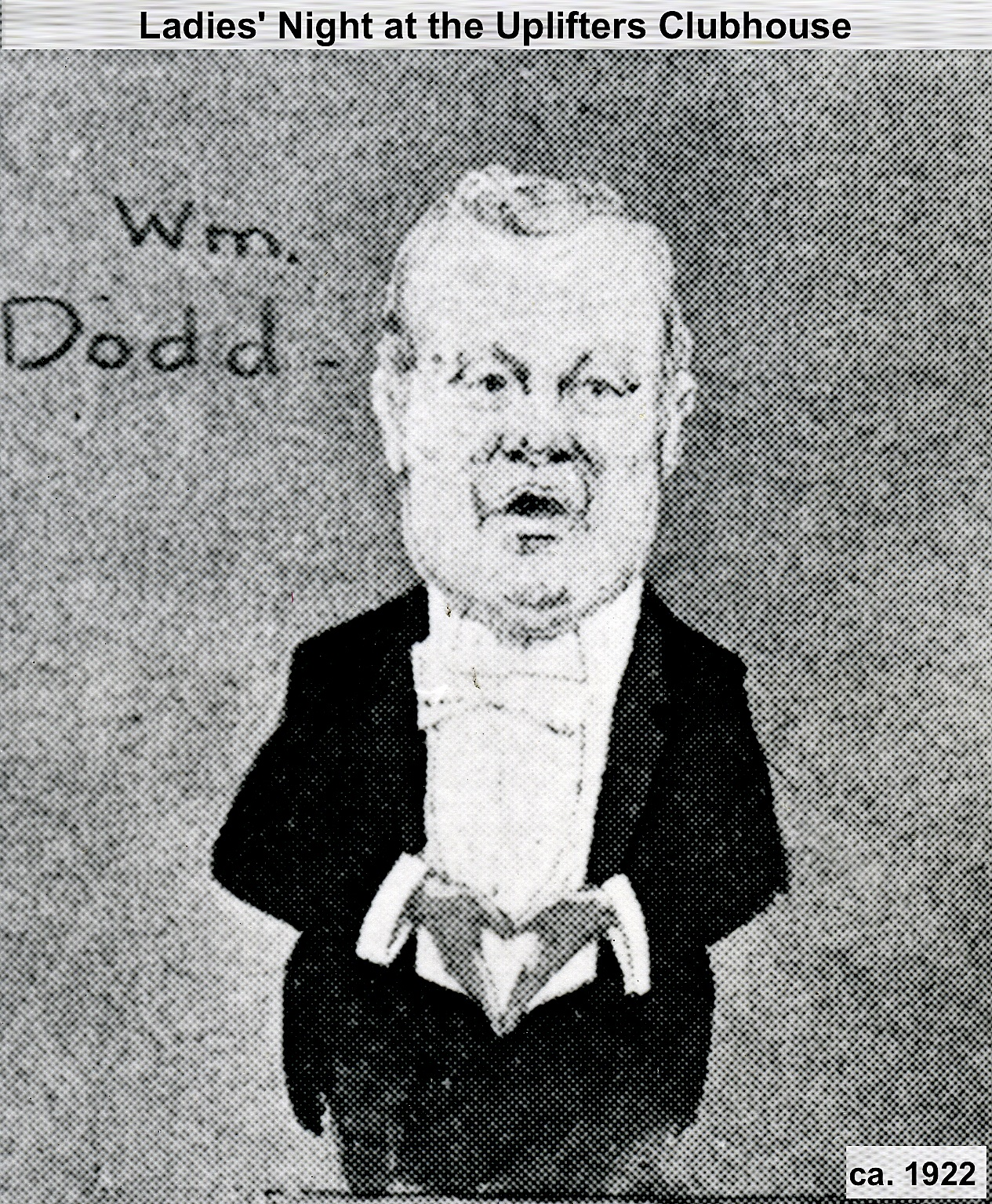
Cartoon from 1922 Uplifters Club Yearbook

Dodd was an amateur musical and theatrical performer. For public and private occasions he was known to sing popular airs and, as well, provide recitations of Irish, Welsh & German verse; his effective ear for the Irish pronunciation was remarked upon. He served on the founding boards of the Louisville Symphony Orchestra (1908) and the Louisville Art Association (1909), now Louisville Visual Art, and he was a member of dramatic societies in both Louisville and Los Angeles. From 1916 to 1919 he served on the board of directors of the Los Angeles Symphony Orchestra, this latter organization being the predecessor of the LA Philharmonic, and he was a mover and shaker in the Los Angeles Gamut Club, an exclusively male music fraternity. In 1918, the journal Pacific Coast Musical Review said "It seems Mr. Dodd has the knack of making artists and others do what he wants them to" and nicknamed Dodd "the Mayor of Seventh Street", presumably a reference to the theater and vaudeville district of old Los Angeles. From 1917 until his death he served on the California State Board of Examiners. In 1929, he joined the newly founded International Desert Conservation League as an advisory board member.

== Death ==
William became acutely ill while traveling abroad with his wife in the spring of 1930, returning home without Ione in early May and dying at Los Angeles on June 14, 1930, in Hollywood Hospital. Cause of death: lymphocytic leukemia with hypostatic pneumonia. The funeral was postponed until June 28, 1930, upon the return of Ione from Europe, his last rites and burial conducted at Forest Lawn Cemetery, Glendale, Little Church of the Flowers. Obituary notices of June 15, 23, 27 and 28 make no mention of any religious facilitation of Dodd's obsequies. For enlarged context on Dodd's religious affiliation, see the "Early Years" section above. Ione lived on, accompanied by two widowed sisters Kate & Sallie, in California. Death came for Ione in February 1950 as a patient at Camarillo State Mental Hospital, per death certificate.

== Extant designs ==
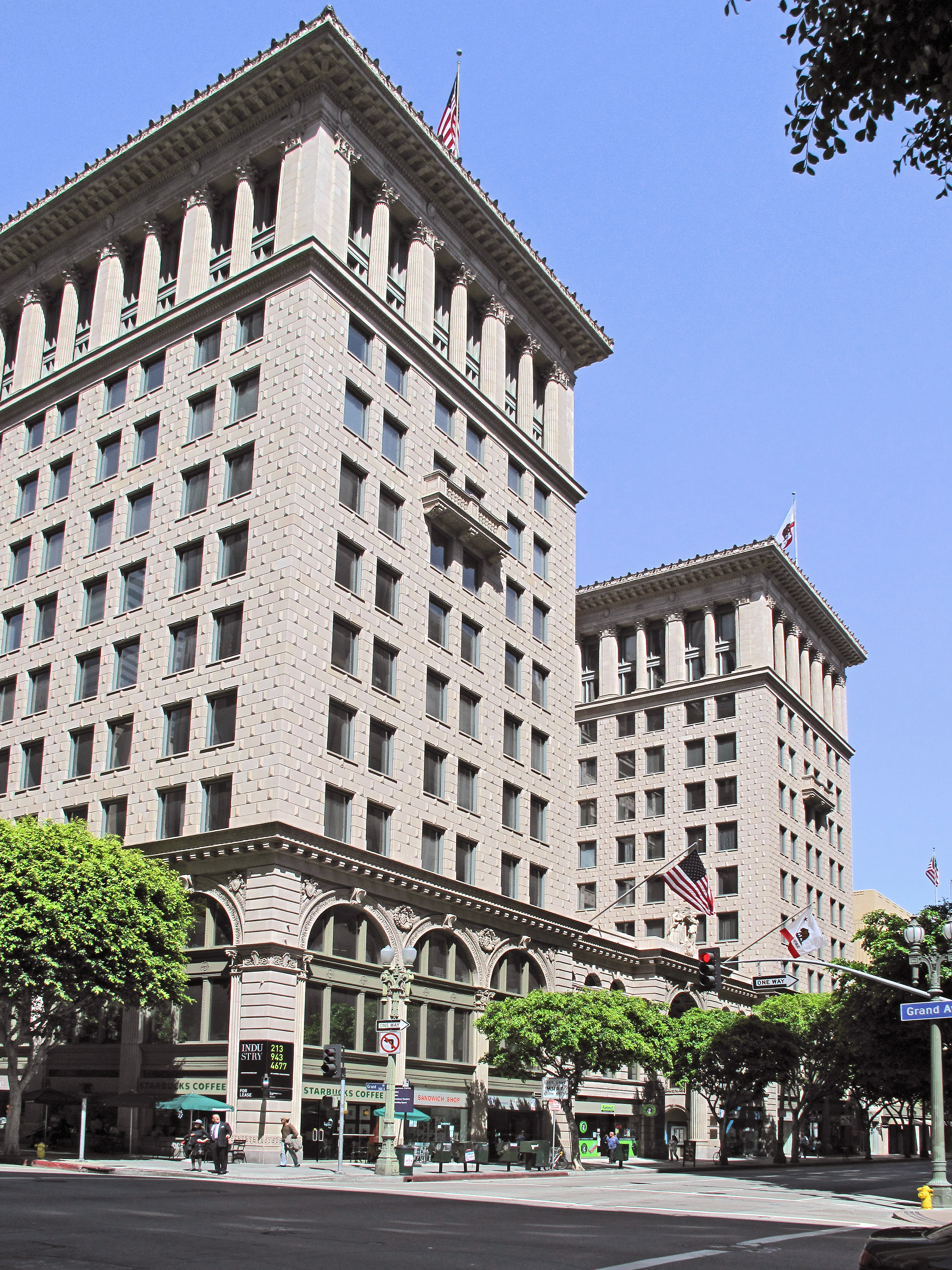
Pacific Mutual Life Building, Los Angeles (in 2012), now known as Pacific Center. Dodd & Richards design of 1919.

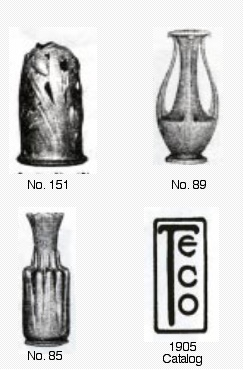
Three Dodd Teco designs from 1905 Teco Catalog of the Gates Potteries Co. See External Links below.

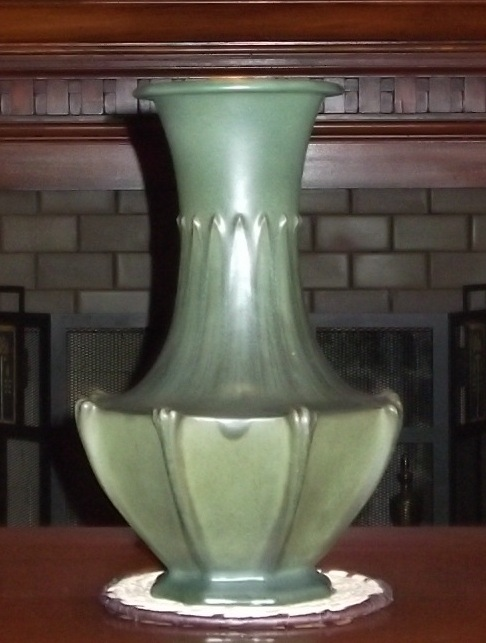
Dodd designed Teco vase No. #87 (c. 1902). Size: 12" x 8". See 1905 Teco Catalog in External Links below.

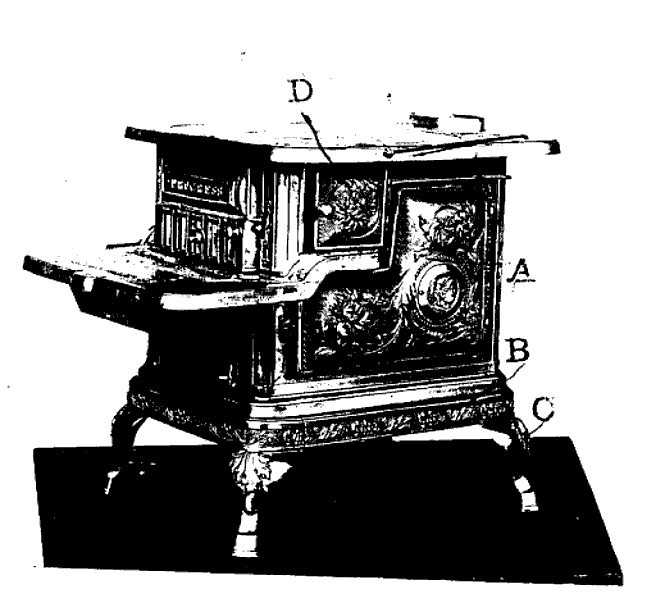
Design of a Cooking-Stove 1887 W. J. Dodd, Louisville, Kentucky

Illustration by W. J. Dodd for an 1893 essay "Gondola Days" by F. Hopkinson Smith published by Southern Magazine

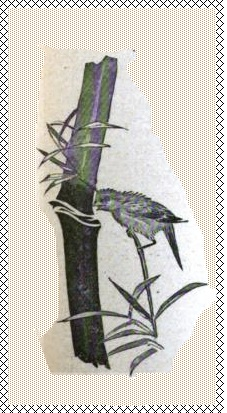
Illustration by W. J. Dodd for an 1895 story on Japanese themes in a magazine.

=== Kentucky ===
Street numbers reflect the year 1909 citywide renumbering of street addresses in advance of the 1910 U.S. Census.

==== Old Louisville-Limerick Historic Residential District ====
- Max Selliger residence (mid 1886), 1022 S. 3rd St.
- Louis Seelbach residence (1888). 926 S. 6th St.
- George A. Newman residence (1891), 1123 S. 3rd St.
- Charles L. Robinson residence (1890–1891), 1334 S. 3rd St.
- W. J. Dodd residence (1891–1892: first residence 33 St James Ct) 1467a St. James Court
- Paul Cain residence (1891–1892: first residence 35 St James Ct) 1467b St. James Court
- Bernard Flexner residence (1892–1893), 525 W. Ormsby Ave.
- Jacob A. Flexner residence (1892–1893), 531 W. Omsby Ave.
- Harry McGoodwin residence (1893), 1504 S. 3rd St.
- St. Paul's Episcopal Church (1895) Maury & Dodd, now West End Baptist, Fourth and Magnolia
- Dr. G. W. Lewman residence (1896), 1365 S. 3rd. Maury & Dodd.
- J. W. Brown residence (1896), 1455 S. 4th. Maury & Dodd.
- William T. Johnston residence (1896), 1457 S. 4th.
- Shakleford Miller residence (1897), 1454 S. 4th St.
- Edmund Trabue residence (1897), 1419 St. James Court.
- Benjamin Straus residence (1897), 1464 S. 3rd St.
- William Thalheimer residence (1897), 1433 S. 3rd St.
- Eugene Leander residence (1897), 1384 S. 2nd St.
- Samuel Grabfelder residence (1897–1899), 1442 S. 3rd St.
- Joseph G McCulloch residence (1897), 1435 S. 3rd St.
- John P. Starks residence (1898), 1412 St. James Court
- Four-stall stable and carriage house for S. Grabfelder residence (c. 1901), 1442 S. 3rd St.
- Five-stall stable and carriage house for EH Ferguson residence (c. 1902),
- Fourth Avenue Methodist-Episcopal Church (1901–1902), Fourth and St. Catherine
- Edwin H. Ferguson mansion (1902–1905), now The Filson Historical Society, Third and Ormsby
- 1244 and 1246 Ormsby Court (1907), McDonald & Dodd Attributed by both style and ownership
- Addison R. Smith residence (1910–11), 1425 S. 3rd, McDonald & Dodd
- Wyble Mapother residence (1910–11), 1429 S. 3rd, McDonald & Dodd
- William J. Dodd residence (Spring/Summer 1910), 1448 St James Court
- Standard Oil of Kentucky Offices (1912 May-Oct), Fifth and Bloom St. McDonald & Dodd
- T. Hoyt and Annie J. Gamble residence (late 1912), 119 W. Ormsby Ave.

==== Elsewhere in Louisville ====
- Louisville Trust Building (1891) Maury & Dodd, Fifth and Market
- Covenant Presbyterian Church (1891), now Fifth Street Baptist, 1901 W. Jefferson St.
- Sam Stone Bush residence (1893), 230 Kenwood Hill
- Cornelia Bush residence (1894), 316 Kenwood Hill
- Arthur Cobb residence (c. 1896–7), 4561 S. 2nd St., Beechmont
- Flemish style library addition to Sam Stone Bush residence (1900), 230 Kenwood Hill Rd.
- Atherton Building (1901), Fourth and Muhammad Ali
- Jacob L. Smyser residence (1902), 1035 Cherokee Rd.
- Presbyterian Theological Seminary (c. 1902–1906) now Jefferson Community & Technical College, Broadway
- Western Branch of the Louisville Free Public Library (c. 1905), Tenth and Chestnut
- Atherton Building and Mary Anderson Theatre (1907), 610 S. 4th St.
- Stewarts Building (1907), also known as Stewart Dry Goods Company, Fourth and Muhammad Ali
- Seelbach Hotel (1902 Andrews & Dodd; 1907 McDonald & Dodd), Fourth and Muhammad Ali
- 143 Bayly Ave (1910), McDonald & Dodd
- Louisville Country Club (1910) McDonald & Dodd
- Walnut Street Theatre (1910), 414 W. Muhammad Ali (formerly Walnut St.)
- George Gaulbert Memorial Shelter House (1910), Cherokee Park
- First Christian Church (1911), now Immanuel Baptist Church, Fourth and Breckinridge streets
- Charles L. Nelson residence (1911–1912), 2327 Cherokee Pkwy, McDonald & Dodd
- Weissinger-Gaulbert Apartments Annex (c. 1912), Broadway
- YMCA Building (1911–1912), Third and Broadway, Now the Francis Parker School of Louisville
- Louis Seelbach mansion (1911–1912) or "Barnard Hall". 715 Alta Vista Rd.

==== Elsewhere ====
- Lewis Witherspoon and Eliza Irwin McKee residence (Autumn 1886), 1224 Harrodsburg Rd., Lawrenceburg
- Charles Bonnycastle Robinson residence (1889), a.k.a. "Bonnycot". 1111 Bellewood Rd., Anchorage
- Nelson County Courthouse (1892) Maury & Dodd, Bardstown Historic District
- George Franklin Berry Mansion (c. 1900, addition 1912) 700 Louisville Rd., Frankfort
- Eight-stall stable and carriage house for Peter Lee Atherton residence (c. 1902), Glenview
- Muhlenberg County Courthouse (1907), Greenville
- Citizens National Life Insurance Building (1910–1911), 100 Park Road, Anchorage
- William R. Belknap residence (1905–1912), a.k.a. "Lincliff", 6100 Longview Lane, Glenview
- Alfred Brandeis residence (1911–1912), a.k.a. "Ladless Hill", 6501 Longview Lane, Glenview

=== Elsewhere (1885—1912) ===
Street numbers reflect the year 1909 citywide renumbering of street addresses in advance of the 1910 U.S. Census.

- Washington Irving Beman residence (1885), 5425 S. Blackstone, Hyde Park, Chicago, Illinois
- Helen Reid/William M. Whaley residence (1892), 317 Colonial Ave., a.k.a. Beechwood Place Ghent (Norfolk), Virginia
- C. Hunter Raine mansion, a.k.a. "Beverly Hall" (c. 1905–1906), Central and Willett, Memphis, Tennessee
- Bishop Thomas Gailor residence, Episcopal Cathedral of St. Mary (c. 1905), 700 Poplar Ave., Memphis, Tennessee

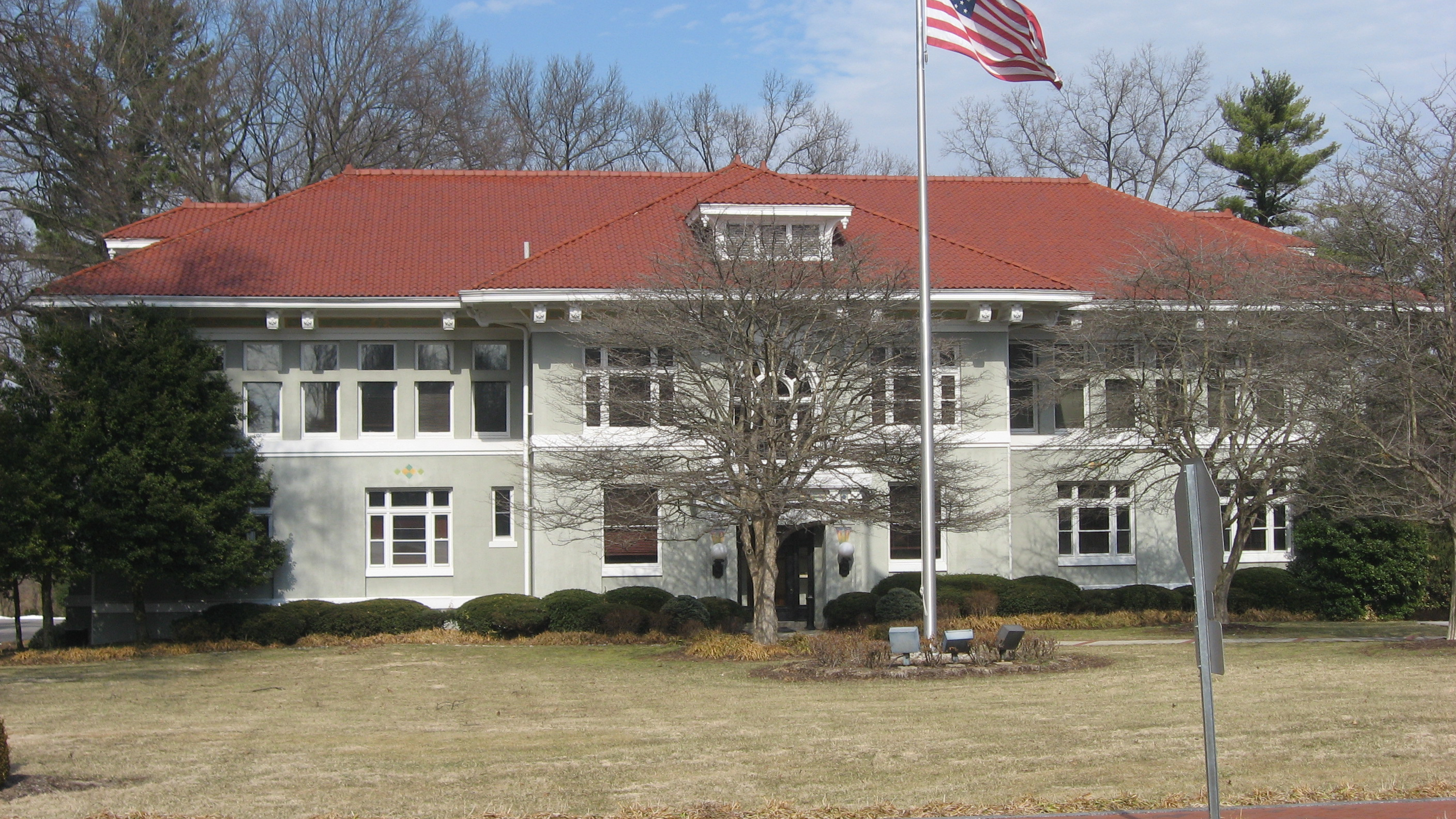
Citizens Nat'l Life Insurance Bldg, Anchorage KY 1910-11 McDonald & Dodd

=== California ===
==== Los Angeles ====
- W. J. Dodd (first) residence (c. 1914–1915) 2010 DeMille Dr.
- Hearst's Los Angeles Herald-Examiner Building, downtown (c. 1915). Design team of Morgan, Haenke & Dodd
- Coulter's department store (1916–1917), 500 W. 7th St.
- Annex to Brockman Bldg. (1916–17) 7th St. & Grand Ave., originally J.J Haggarty's
- Huntsberger-Mennell Bldg. (1917), 412 W. 7th St.
- Henning Bldg. (1917), 518 W. 7th St.
- Ville de Paris department store Bldg. (1917), 420 W. 7th St.
- Ponet Company Bldg. (1918–1919) and Chevrolet Motor Company Showroom (1920), 12th & Hope
- Heron Building (1919–1920), originally the State Building, 6th and Olive
- Brock & Co. Building (1921), 515 W. 7th St.
- Pacific Mutual Life Insurance Building, now PacMutual, 523 W. Sixth St. at Olive Street (with William Richards, 1921)
- Kenneth Preuss residence (1921–1922), 5235 Linwood
- W. J. Dodd (second) residence (c. 1922), 5226 Linwood
- Lloyd W. Moultrie residence (1922), 44 N Haldeman Road
- Uplifters Club House (1923), now the Rustic Canyon Recreation Center, Haldeman Road
- Good Samaritan Physicians Bldg. (1923), 6th and Lucas
- Apartment Bldg. (1923), 3105 W. 6th, now Borden Retail and Apts.
- The Virginia Robinson Gardens (1924–1930): pool, pavilion and other additions. Dodd & Richards and Charles Gibbs Adams (landscaping). 1008 Elden Way, Beverly Hills
- J. W. Robinson's store (1924), 600 W. 7th.
- Jacob Riis Vocational School for Boys (1927), renamed as Mary McLeod Bethune Junior High School, on 69th between Broadway and Main
- Residence (1930) 8252 Rees Ave.
- Ivan Miller residence (1930) 8207 Delgany Ave. Intended as his retirement house.
- W. J. Dodd final residence of record (1928–1930) 1975 DeMille Dr. Built by Dodd but plans drawn up by Wesley Eager.

==== Elsewhere ====
- H. L. Rivers house (1918), a.k.a. "Los Rios Rancho", Oak Glen
- Pasadena Medical Bldg. (1924) a.k.a. Professional Bldg., 65 N. Madison Ave. Pasadena
- William and Nelia Mead residence (1924), now "The Willows Inn", Tahquitz Canyon Way, Palm Springs
- Roland Bishop residence (1925), now "The Willows Inn", Tahquitz Canyon Way, Palm Springs
- San Gabriel Mission Auditorium, greater Los Angeles (1926). Designed by Arthur Benton and W.J. Dodd.
- Upman residence, Mendocino Lane, Altadena (1926–8). Landscaping & addition by Lloyd Wright

== Demolished or destroyed ==
=== Kentucky ===
==== Louisville ====
- Thompson A. Lyon residence (c. 1893, demolished c. 1970), 4646 Bellevue
- J. E. Whitney Cottage (1899, demolished 1951) 210 E. Gray St.
- Masonic Theater (1903, demolished 1956), Chestnut between Third and Fourth
- Atherton Building (1901, demolished 1979), Fourth and Muhammad Ali
- Frankel Memorial Chapel (collapsed July 2012), 2716 Preston St.
- Lincoln Building (1906–1907, demolished 1972), Fourth and Market
- Equitable Building (1896–7, demolished 1975), Dodd & Cobb
- Rio Vista a.k.a. Country estate of Mr. and Mrs. John H. Caperton, (1909–1910, demolished c. 1955), River Road, Mockingbird Valley
- Second Presbyterian Church (1909, destroyed 1956), Second and Broadway, McDonald & Dodd
- Franklin Bldg., 658-660 4th St. (1910, demolished 1983), McDonald & Dodd

==== Elsewhere ====
- Jennie Casseday Rest Cottage for Working Girls, originally Beechmoor or Beechmore (c. 1830, demolished 1998), Pewee Valley
- Lansdowne a.k.a. Country estate of S. Thruston Ballard (1907–8, demolished 1976), Glenview

=== Illinois ===
- Kentucky State Building at World's Columbian Exposition (1893), Chicago, Maury & Dodd

=== Tennessee ===
- Albert Sloo Caldwell residence, a.k.a. Baldaur (1897, demolished 1966), formerly 216 N. Waldran Ave/Blvd. Memphis
- Residence of William Boddie Rogers (c. 1902), formerly 1257 Poplar Blvd/St/Ave. Memphis Dr. W.B. Rogers was professor of surgery and dean of the Memphis Hospital Medical College
- Memphis Hospital Medical College (1901, demolished c. 1929), Union near Marshall, later the University of Tennessee College of Medicine

=== California ===
==== Los Angeles ====
- Jacob M. Danziger-Daisy Canfield residence (1914, demolished 1951)
- Frank Upman residence (1914, demolished 1979), 401 S. Westmoreland Ave.
- Rosewall, the first Dorothy and Roland P. Bishop residence (1916, demolished 1950)
- Kinema Theatre (1917, demolished 1941), 642 S. Grand Ave
- Firenze Gardens and Courtyard (c. 1920), 5218-5230 Sunset Blvd.
- Patio Bonito bungalow court (1924), First and Alexandria
- Architects' Building (1927, demolished 1968–1969), Fifth and Figueroa

==== Elsewhere ====
- Bank of America/Los Angeles Trust and Savings Bank (1928, demolished 1970s), Broadway and Brand, Glendale

== See also ==
- Arts and Crafts movement
- Beaux-Arts architecture
- Mediterranean Revival architecture
- Old Louisville
- Minerva Hoyt and the conservation movement
