= First National Pictures =

Film production company

- Formerly: First National Exhibitors' Circuit (1917–1919); Associated First National Pictures, Inc. (1919–1924); First National Pictures, Inc. (1924–1936)
- Industry: Motion picture exhibition, distribution and production
- Founded: 1917; 109 years ago
- Founders: Thomas L. Tally; J. D. Williams
- Defunct: July 12, 1936; 90 years ago (closing all 133 liquidation process)
- Successors: Studio: Warner Bros. Pictures; Library: Warner Bros. (through Turner Entertainment Co.); Public domain (pre-1931)
- Headquarters: United States
- Products: Motion pictures, film distribution
- Parent: Warner Bros. (1928–1936)

First National Pictures, Inc. was an American motion picture production and distribution company. It was founded in 1917 as First National Exhibitors' Circuit, Inc., an association of independent theatre owners in the United States, and became the country's largest theater chain. Expanding from exhibiting movies to distributing them, the company reincorporated in 1919 as Associated First National Theatres, Inc., and Associated First National Pictures, Inc. In 1924 it expanded to become a motion picture production company as First National Pictures, Inc., and became an important studio in the film industry. In September 1928, control of First National passed to Warner Bros., into which it was completely absorbed on November 4, 1929. A number of Warner Bros. films were thereafter branded First National Pictures until July 1936, when First National Pictures, Inc., was dissolved.

== Early history ==
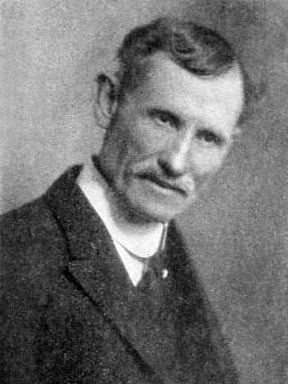
Thomas L. Tally (1915)

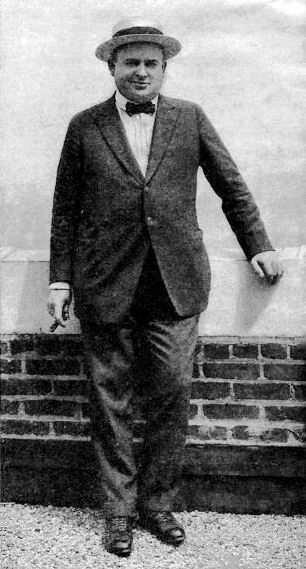
J. D. Williams (1921)

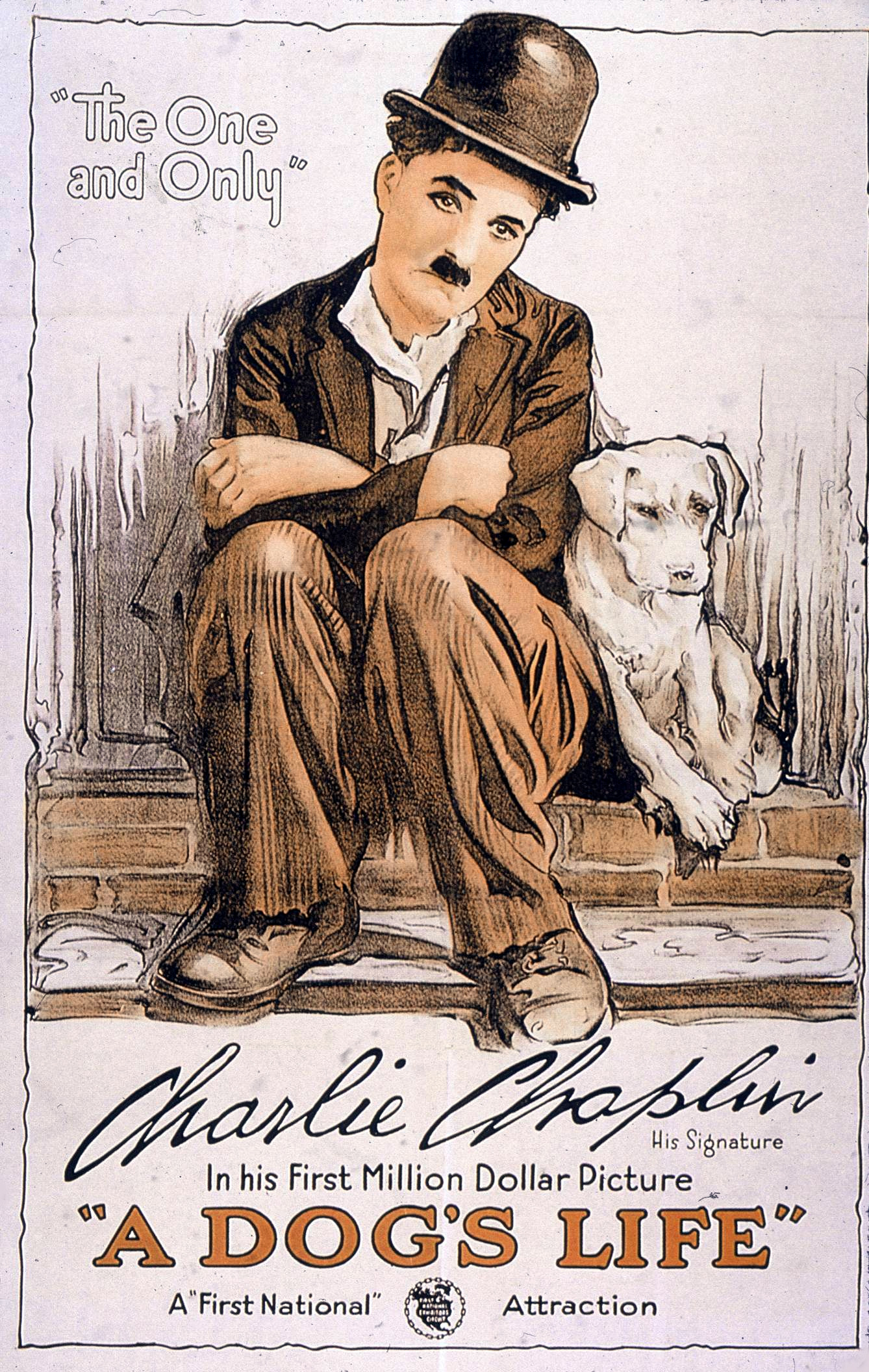
Poster for A Dog's Life (1918), Charlie Chaplin's first film under his $1 million contract with First National

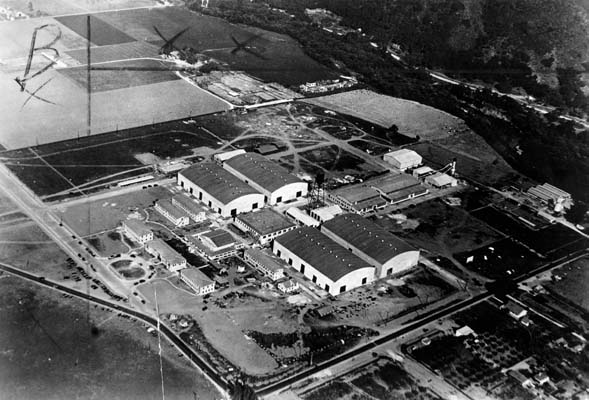
First National Pictures studios in Burbank, California (c. 1928)

The First National Exhibitors' Circuit was founded in 1917 by the merger of 26 of the biggest first-run cinema chains in the United States. It eventually controlled over 600 cinemas, more than 200 of them first-run houses (as opposed to the less lucrative second-run or neighbourhood theatres to which films moved when their initial box office receipts dwindled).

First National was the brainchild of Thomas L. Tally, who was reacting to the overwhelming influence of Paramount Pictures, which dominated the market. In 1912, he thought that a conglomerate of theatres throughout the nation could buy or produce and distribute its own films. In 1917 Tally and J. D. Williams formed First National Exhibitors' Circuit.

The first film released through First National was the 1916 British film The Mother of Dartmoor. Between 1917 and 1918, the company made contracts with Mary Pickford and Charlie Chaplin, the first million-dollar deals in the history of film.

Chaplin's contract allowed him to produce his films without a set release schedule. However, the production of the feature film The Kid ran so long that the company started to complain.

To address their concerns, Chaplin invited the exhibitors to the studio, and they were so impressed by the project and charmed by the players, especially co-star Jackie Coogan, that they agreed to be patient. That patience was ultimately rewarded when The Kid became a major critical and box office success.

First National's distribution of films by independent producers is credited with launching careers including that of Louis B. Mayer.

First National Exhibitors' Circuit was reincorporated in 1919 as Associated First National Pictures, Inc., and its subsidiary, Associated First National Theatres, Inc., with 5,000 independent theater owners as members.

Associated First National Pictures expanded from only distributing films to producing them in 1924 and changed its corporate name to First National Pictures, Inc. It built its 62-acre (25 ha) studio lot in Burbank in 1926. The Motion Picture Theatre Owners of America and the Independent Producers' Association declared war in 1925 on what they termed a common enemy—the "film trust" of Metro-Goldwyn-Mayer, Paramount, and First National, which they claimed dominated the industry not only by producing and distributing motion pictures but also by entering into exhibition as well.

Jacob Fabian, movie magnate known for pioneering the establishment of large motion picture theaters, starting in New Jersey, was Vice-President of Associated First National Pictures Producers, which evolved to First National Pictures, Inc. in 1924. He was an original franchise-holder of the organization as owner of the New Jersey First National Exchange.

In March 1926, Fabian and sons acquired a large block of stock in West Coast Theatres, Inc.

By May 1926, a merger took place with the Stanley Company, headed by Jules E. Mastbaum, creating an unbroken chain of theaters from Massachusetts to Virginia called the Stanley Company of America.

Following the passing of Mastbaum in December 1926, a $100 Million consolidation merger occurred between First National Pictures, The Stanley Company of America, and West Coast Theatres, creating the largest theater holding company in the world. During this time, a block of theaters were sold to Warner Bros. Pictures, who would later pioneer sound to film (talkies) with The Jazz Singer in late 1927.

In July 1928, the Stanley Company elected a new Board of Directors, including Jacob Fabian and his son Simon H. Fabian.

== Acquisition by Warner Bros. ==
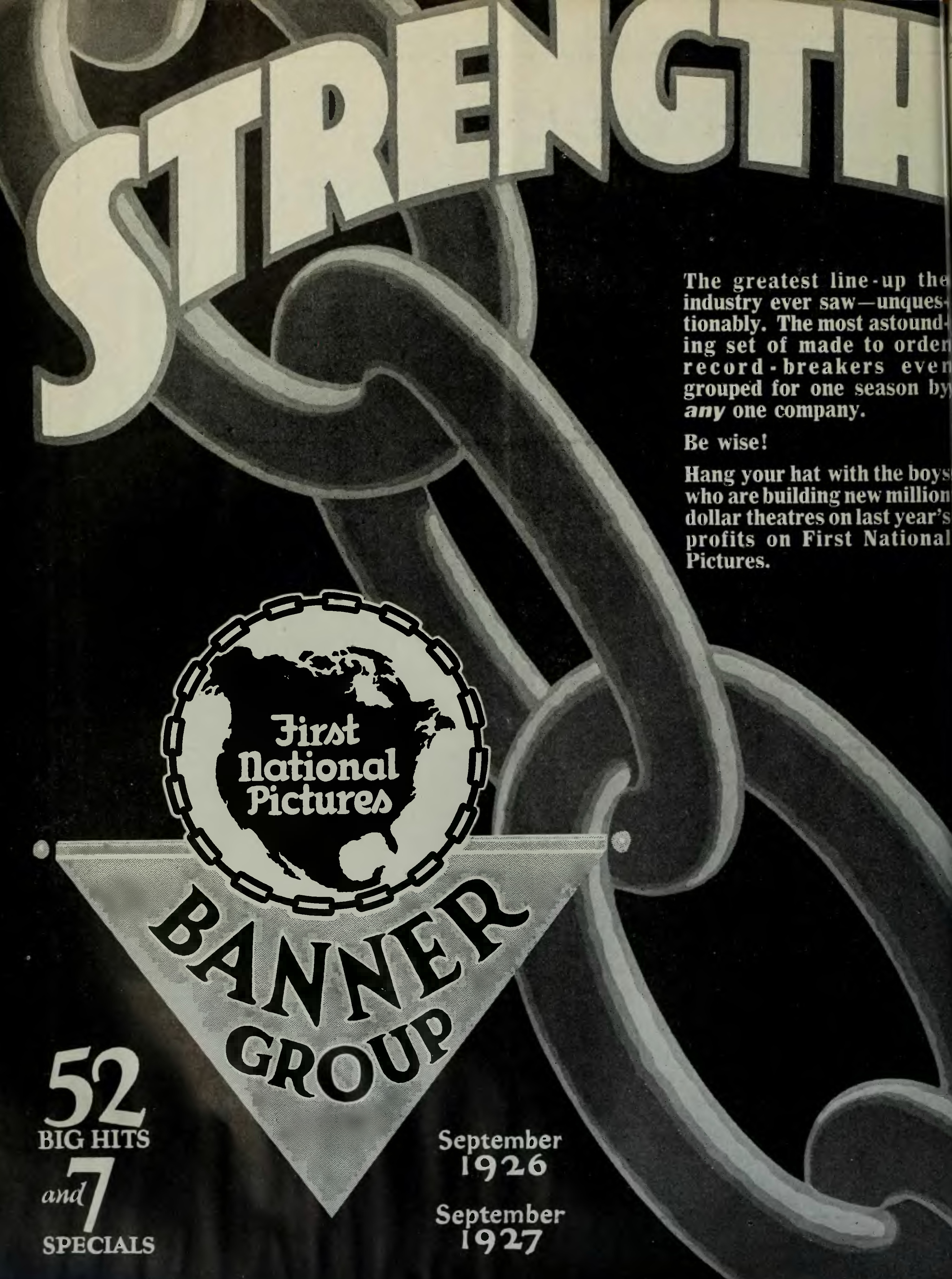
First National Pictures advertisement in The Film Daily, 1926

Warner Bros. held 42,000 shares of common stock out of 72,000 outstanding shares while Fox Pictures held 21,000 shares; 12,000 shares were publicly held. Warner Bros. acquired access to First National's affiliated chain of theatres, while First National acquired access to Vitaphone sound equipment. Warner Bros. and First National continued to operate as separate entities. As a result of Warner Bros. acquiring one of the major film studios in First National, Warner Bros. became one of the largest producing, distributing, and exhibiting companies in Hollywood.

On November 4, 1929, Fox sold its interest in First National to Warner Bros. for $10 million. The First National studio in Burbank became the official home of Warner Bros.–First National Pictures. Thereafter, First National Pictures became a trade name for the distribution of a designated segment of Warner Bros. product. 45 of the 86 Warner Bros. feature films released in 1929 were branded as First National Pictures. Half of the 60 feature films Warner Bros. announced for release in 1933–1934 were to be First National Pictures.

Although both studios produced "A" and "B" budget pictures, generally the prestige productions, costume dramas, and musicals were made by Warner Bros., while First National specialized in modern comedies, dramas, and crime stories. Short subjects were made by yet another affiliated company, The Vitaphone Corporation (which took its name from the sound process).

In July 1936, stockholders of First National Pictures, Inc. (primarily Warner Bros.) voted to dissolve the corporation and distribute its assets among the stockholders in line with a new tax law which provided for tax-free consolidations between corporations.

From 1929 to 1958, most Warner Bros. films and promotional posters bore the trademark and copyright credits "A Warner Bros.–First National Picture" in their opening and closing sequences.

== See also ==
- United States v. Paramount Pictures, Inc.
