= Old Crow =

Brand of Kentucky-made straight bourbon whiskey

Old Crow Bourbon whiskey
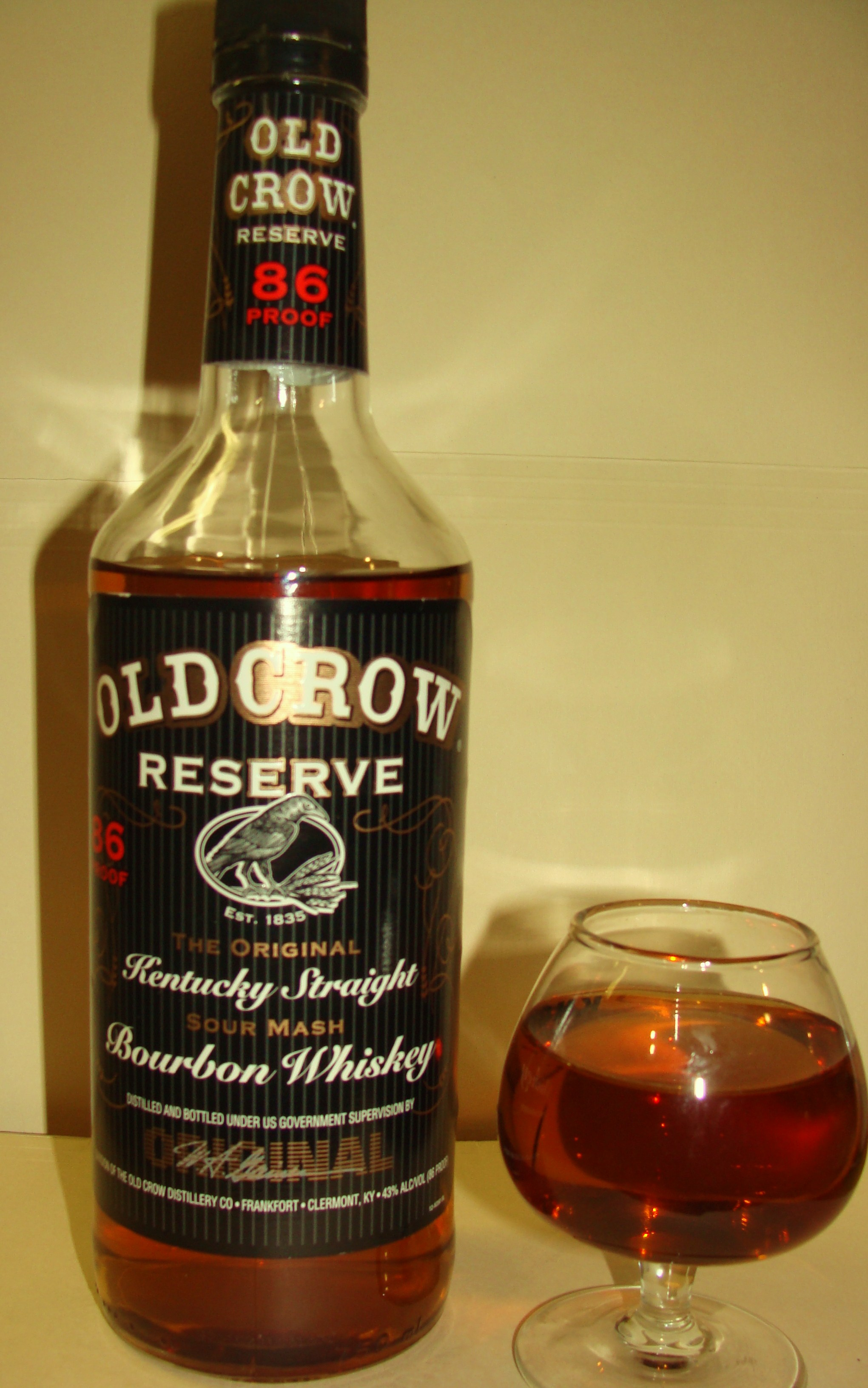
- Old Crow Reserve
- Type: Bourbon whiskey
- Manufacturer: Suntory Global Spirits
- Origin: United States
- Introduced: 1835
- Alcohol by volume: 40.00-43.00%
- Proof (US): 80-86
- Related products: Jim Beam

Old Crow is a low-priced brand of Kentucky-made straight bourbon whiskey distilled by Suntory Global Spirits, which also produces Jim Beam and several other brands of whiskey. The current Old Crow product uses the same mash bill and yeast as Jim Beam, but is aged for a shorter period of time.

The Old Crow brand has a venerable history as one of Kentucky's earliest bourbons. Old Crow is aged in barrels for a minimum of three years, and in the United States is 80 proof while Old Crow Reserve is aged for a minimum of four years and is 86 proof.

== History ==
James C. Crow, a Scottish immigrant, started distilling what would become Old Crow in Frankfort, Kentucky, in the 1830s. Reportedly a very skilled distiller, he made whiskey for various employers, which was sold as "Crow" or, as it aged, "Old Crow" – and the brand acquired its reputation from the latter. Crow died in 1856. W.A. Gaines and Company acquired the name and continued to distill whiskey according to his methods, hiring Crow's assistant William F. Mitchell to be the chief distiller. The substantial remaining stock of original Old Crow acquired near-legendary status. After the Civil War the Old Crow logo was changed from a picture of James Crow to the current crow perched atop grains of barley. In 1875, offering drinks from the last available cask reportedly secured the election of Joseph Clay Stiles Blackburn of Kentucky to his first Congressional term. A dispute over ownership of the name "Old Crow" was decided in 1915 in favor of the Gaines company.

Although the whiskey had been at one time the top selling bourbon in the United States, it underwent a swift decline in the second half of the twentieth century. A production error in the amount of "setback" (the portion of spent mash added to a new batch in the sour mash process) negatively impacted the taste of the whiskey, and the distiller's inability or unwillingness to correct it led to many customers switching to other brands. Parent company National Distillers was sold to Jim Beam in 1987. The Old Crow recipe and distillery were abandoned and the product became a three-year-old bourbon based on the Jim Beam mashbill. In 2013 Glenns Creek Distillery started operations in part of the former Old Crow Distillery.

== Old Crow Chessmen ==
National Distillers brought out the Old Crow Chessmen ceramic decanters in 1969 as an attractive packaging for its 10-year-old 86-proof bourbon. They stand 12–15.5 inches (30–39 cm) tall, hold a fifth (about 750 mL) of liquor, and the opposing sides were glazed in golden ochre versus a dark green. A deep-pile carpet chessboard measured 45 by 45 inches (110 cm × 110 cm). The decanters sold originally for some US$14. A full set would consist of 32 decanters, 16 of which were pawns. The production was limited to some 2,000 pieces, intended for only one Christmas season, and the molds reputedly were destroyed. Today the bourbon contents of these decanters are highly prized.

== Famous drinkers ==
A famous politician who preferred Old Crow was Henry Clay, of Kentucky, who was even featured in Old Crow advertisements.

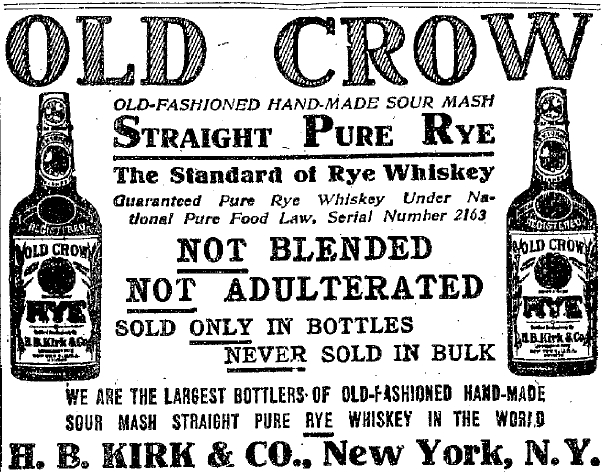
An advertisement for Old Crow Rye Whiskey in the December 31, 1909 edition of The New York Times.

World War II "triple ace" Bud Anderson named his P-51 Mustang Old Crow, after the whiskey.

Senator Mitch McConnell from Kentucky has stated that Old Crow is his favorite bourbon.

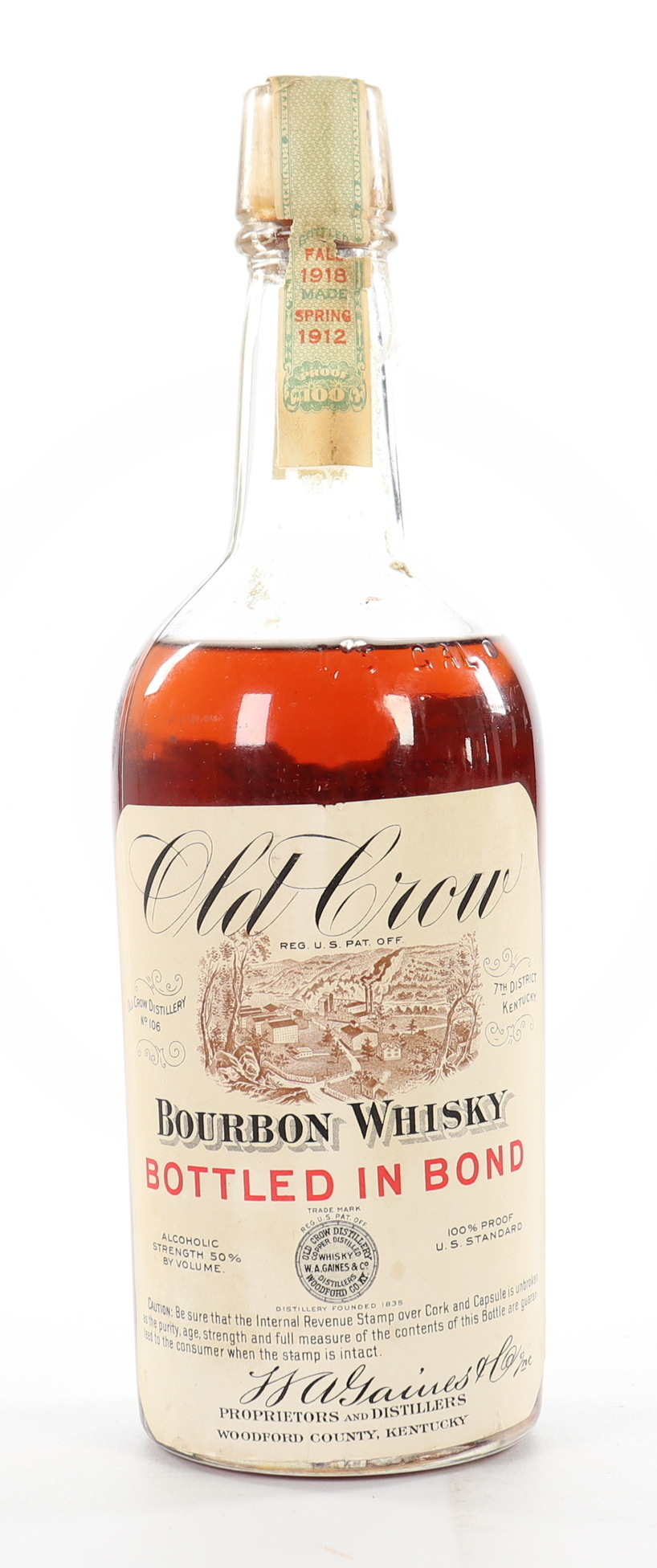
Pre-prohibition Old Crow, distilled 1912, bottled 1918.

== In popular culture ==
Old Crow is said to have been the favorite bourbon of American writers Mark Twain and William Faulkner. Journalist Hunter S. Thompson liked it. Twain reportedly visited the distillery in the 1880s, and Old Crow advertised this heavily; John C. Gerber sees in this commercial exploitation a sign of Twain's continuing popularity. As for Thompson, the frequent occurrences of the drink in his writing, semi-autobiographical as well as fictional, have led to similar associations. The manufacturer actively pursued such publicity: in 1955, they took out an ad in College English, the journal of the National Council of Teachers of English, offering $250 for every authenticated reference to their product one could find in past literature or history.

In the 1955 film I Died a Thousand Times, the dying mob boss, Big Mac (Lon Chaney Jr.), drinks Old Crow in violation of doctor's orders.

The 1952 film "Springfield Rifle", disgraced Major Kearney (Gary Cooper) orders Old Crow in a saloon

Throughout Up a Road Slowly, Irene Hunt's 1966 Newbery Award–winning novel, Uncle Haskell drinks copious quantities of Old Crow, taking the empty bottles in a golf bag to bury them at a creek. He claims the Old Crow is rare French wine, so the children begin referring to it as Le Vieux Corbeau.

In recent books in the Spenser series, originated by the late Robert B. Parker and continued by Ace Atkins, the title character regularly refers to drinking Old Crow.

Dirty Bird Blues by Clarence Major the main character, Bluesman Manfred Banks favorite drink is Old Crow.

In the History Channel 3-part mini-series Grant, the general is seen with a bottle of Old Crow.

In Joseph Hansen's series of detective novels, his protagonist Dave Brandstetter drinks Old Crow.

Fans of the military history podcast Lions Led By Donkeys are referred to as "The Legion of The Old Crow"

Principal McVicker from the TV series Beavis and Butthead is seen drinking a bottle of Old Crow in the episode "No Laughing".

== See also ==
- Old Crow Medicine Show
