= Tally's Broadway =

Former movie theater in Los Angeles, California

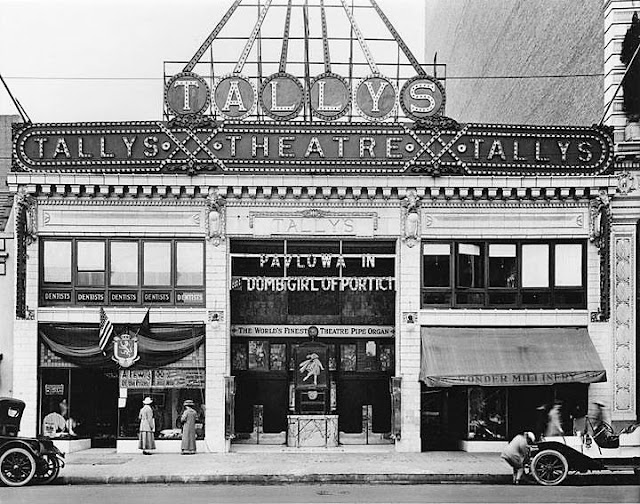
- The building in 1916
- Interactive map of Tally's Broadway
- Address: 833 South Broadway, Los Angeles
- Coordinates: 34.0432°N 118.2557°W
- Owner: Thomas Lincoln Tally
- Capacity: 900
- Type: movie theater
- Screen: 1

Construction
- Built: 1910
- Opened: May 2, 1910
- Demolished: 1928

Tally's Broadway, also known as Tally's New Broadway and Kinemacolor Theatre, was a movie theater located at 833 South Broadway in downtown Los Angeles.

== History ==
Tally's Broadway was built in thirty days and opened on May 2, 1910. Thomas Lincoln Tally was the owner, having previously owned Tally's New Broadway which this theater was also briefly named before adopting the name Tally's Broadway. This theater had a capacity of 900.

In 1912, Tally's Broadway was renamed Kinemacolor Theatre after the kinemacolor process it used to show color films. Through this theater, Tally became the first proprietor to show a color movie in Los Angeles. The theater, however, soon returned to its previous name.

In 1915, the theater's least expensive tickets cost $0.10 ($3.18 in 2025), with the more expensive tickets costing double or triple. Tally's son Seymour managed the theater as of 1916.

The building was demolished in 1928 and replaced by an expansion of the Hamburger's Department Store to its north.

== Architecture and design ==
Tally's Broadway featured an unimposing Classic Revival design with an electric sign on the roof and the word "Tally's" engraved in stone above the building entrance. The entrance was centered in the building and had storefronts on either side.

Inside, the theater featured high ceilings with four large stained glass panels in its center. Sixteen billikens in faintly illuminated bluish-green windows were on either side of the theater. Above the screen was a green curtain, with additional curtains over the windows located at the sides of the theater. Four pendant lamps were located on each side of the theater, hanging from a low-roofed arch. Additional light was provided by twenty-eight indirect ceiling lamps.

=== Orchestra pit ===
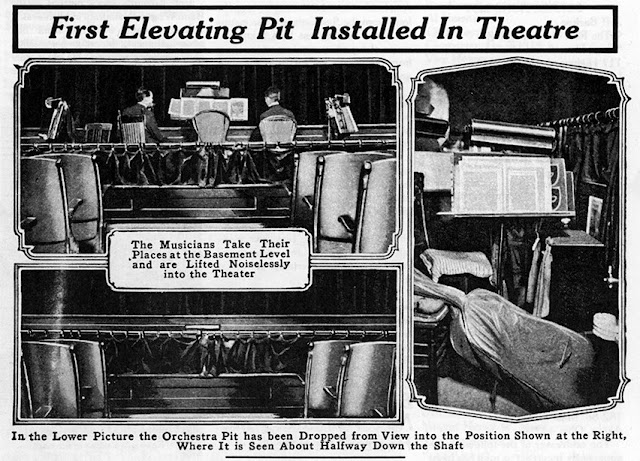
1917 Popular Mechanics article about Tally's Broadway's orchestra pit

Tally's Broadway featured a disappearing orchestra pit, the first in the United States and possibly the entire world. The pit was installed for $1,500 ($51,830 in 2025).

=== Organ ===
Tally's Broadway was said to have the largest theater organ in the world. It was built by Murray M. Harris and consisted of a choir organ on a stage, a swell organ left of the stage and a great organ to the right, and a $7,000 ($222,780 in 2025) echo organ, $1,000 ($31,826 in 2025) harp, and approx. $1,000 chimes about 100 feet (30 m) from the stage just below the ceiling. The organs had approx. 4000 pipes in total and were the first pipe organs ever installed in a movie theater. They were installed c. 1912 and dedicated on January 19, 1914.
