= W.A. Gaines and Company =

American whiskey distillery

Coordinates: 38.1982°N 84.8775°W

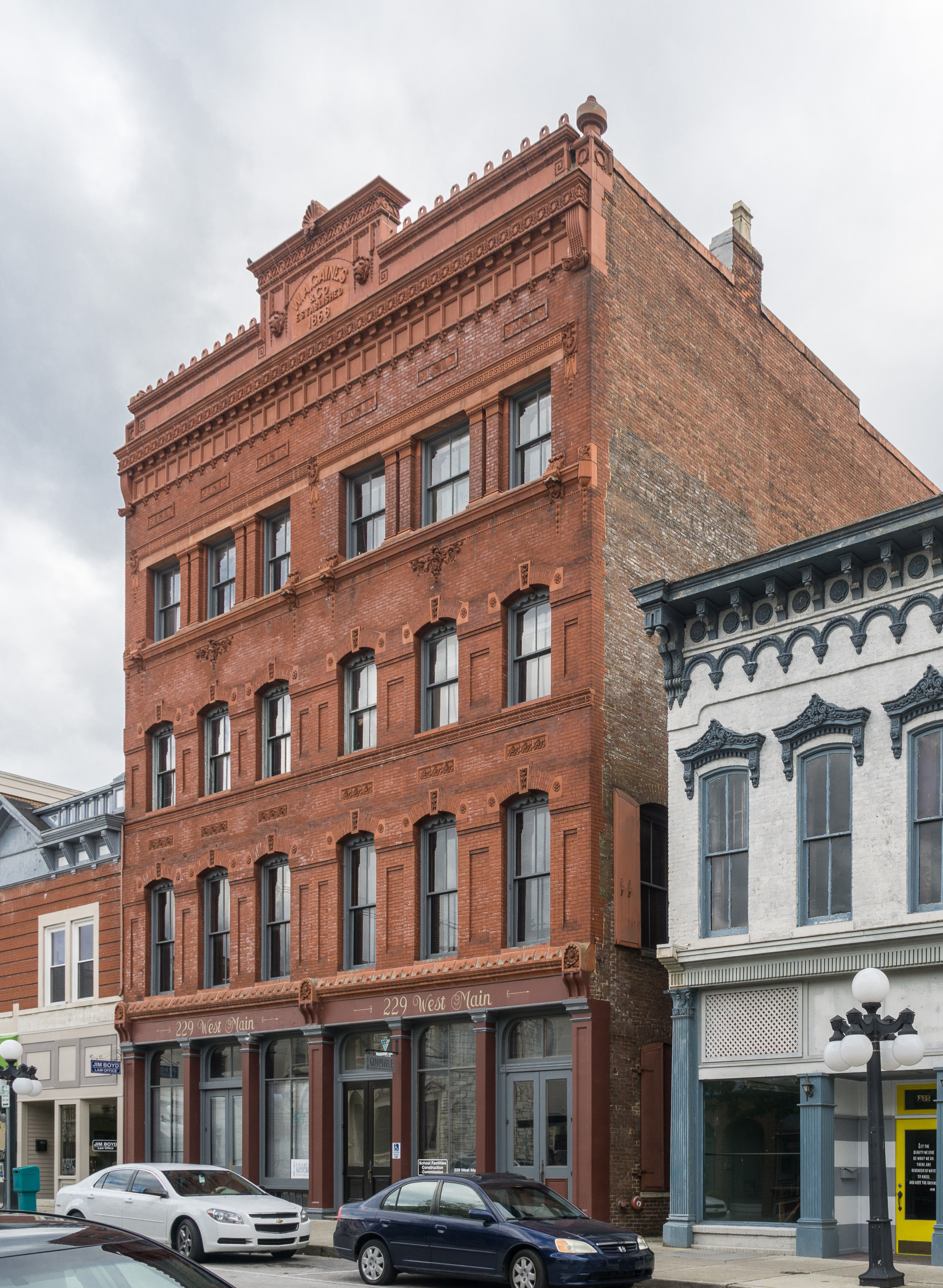
W.A. Gaines & Co. Established 1868. 229 West Main Street. Downtown Frankfort, Kentucky.

W.A. Gaines and Company was a liquor (distilled beverage) company that specialized in American-made whiskeys. Originally started as the partnership Gaines, Berry & Co. in 1862, it was reorganized in 1868 as W.A. Gaines and Company and later became a joint stock company in 1887. Among the company's investors and officers was Edson Bradley.

== History ==
Brands included Old Crow and Old Hermitage. W.A. Gaines erected the Hermitage distillery in 1868, and were the largest producers of fine "sour mash" whiskeys in the world. Its owners were accused of being major players in the "Whiskey Trust", but that was never proved.

The involvement of W.A. Gaines and Co. in the whiskey industry ended with Prohibition. National Distillers, which owned the distillery and brand from the end of Prohibition until 1987, continued to use the W.A. Gaines and Company name. Jim Beam bought National in 1987.

== See also ==
- Old Grand-Dad
