= Million Dollar Theatre =

Movie palace in Los Angeles, California

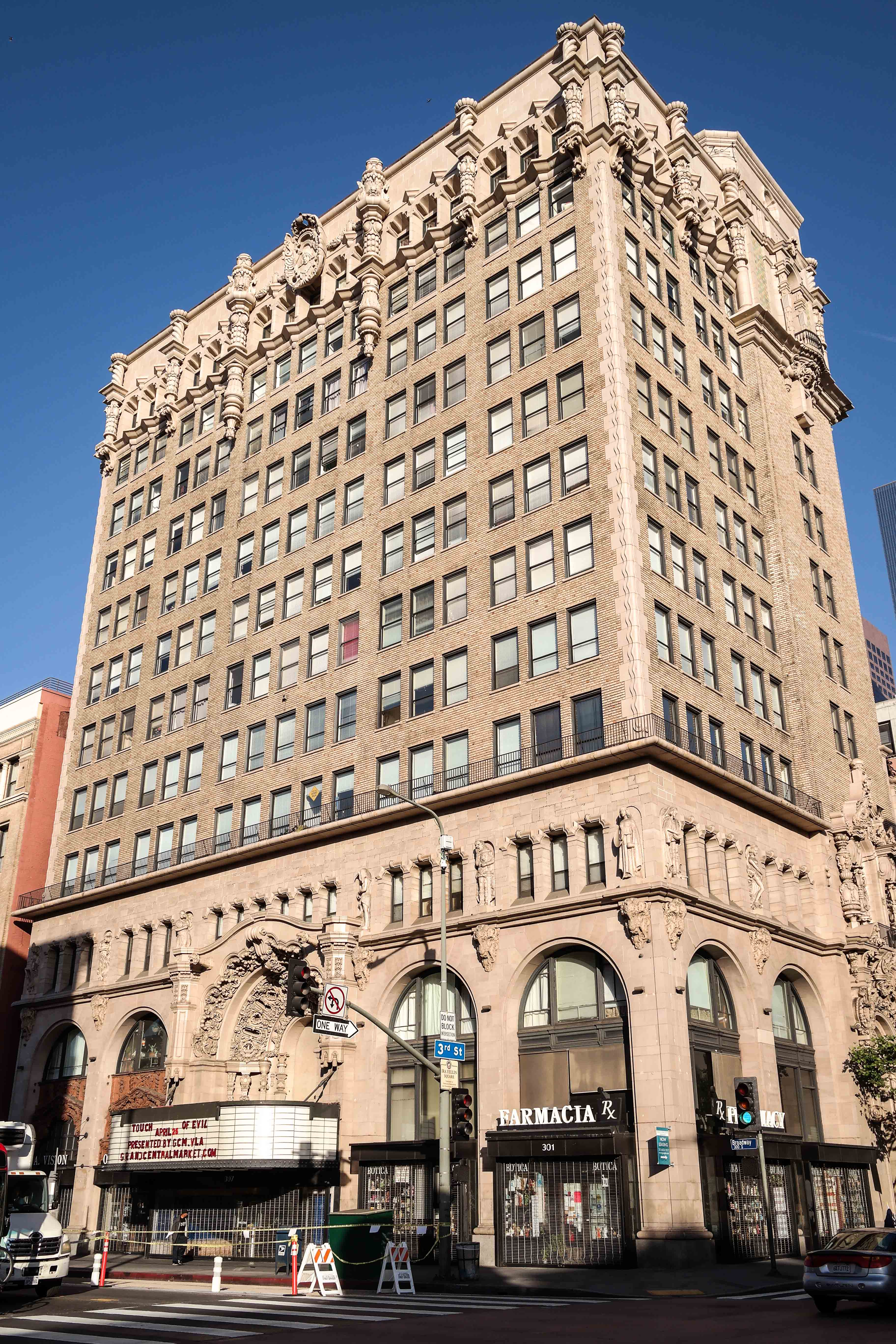
- The Spanish Baroque Revival exterior
- Interactive map of Million Dollar Theatre
- Address: 307 S. Broadway
- Location: Los Angeles, California
- Coordinates: 34°3′2.98″N 118°14′53.29″W
- Owner: Langdon Street Capital
- Capacity: 2,041
- Type: Movie palace
- Public transit: Civic Center/Grand Park station

Construction
- Built: 1917
- Architect: Albert C. Martin Sr.
- Million Dollar Theatre
- U.S. National Register of Historic Places
- U.S. Historic district – Contributing property
- Los Angeles Historic-Cultural Monument
- Part of: Broadway Theater and Commercial District (ID79000484)
- NRHP reference No.: 78000687
- LAHCM No.: 1184

Significant dates
- Added to NRHP: July 20, 1978
- Designated CP: May 9, 1979
- Designated LAHCM: July 2, 2019

The Million Dollar Theatre at 307 S. Broadway in Downtown Los Angeles is one of the first movie palaces built in the United States. It opened in 1917 with the premiere of William S. Hart's The Silent Man. It is the northernmost historical movie palace in the Broadway Theater District and stands directly across from the Bradbury Building. The theater is listed in the National Register of Historic Places.

== History ==
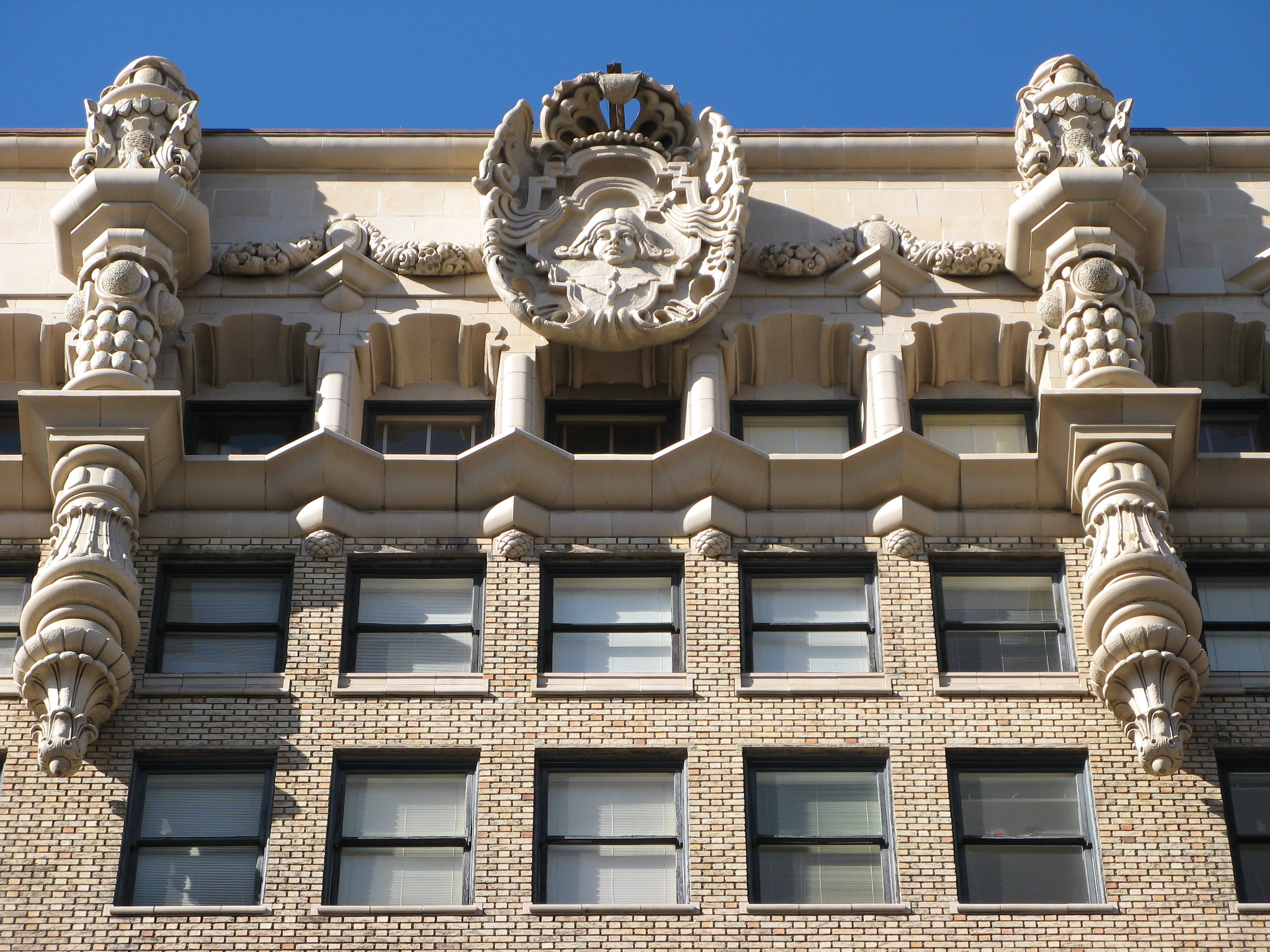
The facade atop the building

The Million Dollar was the first movie house built by entrepreneur Sid Grauman in 1918 as the first grand cinema palace in Los Angeles. Grauman was later responsible for Grauman's Egyptian Theatre and Grauman's Chinese Theatre, both on Hollywood Boulevard, and was partly responsible for the entertainment district shifting from downtown Los Angeles to Hollywood in the mid-1920s.

The theater was built on the site of the Muskegon Block, (built c. 1895), named after Muskegon, Michigan, where its developer Thomas Douglas Stimson had made his fortune in lumber. From 1905–1917, the Ville de Paris department store was located next door at the Homer Laughlin Building, and the Muskegon Block housed retail tenants such as millinery, men's furnishings, jewelry, piano and music stores, as well as offices.

Sculptor Joseph Mora did the elaborate exterior Spanish Colonial Revival ornament, including bursts of lavish Churrigueresque decoration, statues, longhorn skulls, and other odd features. The auditorium architect was William L. Woollett, and the designer of the 12-story tower was Los Angeles architect Albert C. Martin Sr.

For many years, the office building housed the headquarters of the Metropolitan Water District of Southern California.

=== 1940s ===
In the '40s, the theater was the second-run house of the Orpheum Circuit. Acts such as the Nat King Cole Trio, and Joe Liggins and The Honey Drippers performed on its stage. In 1949, the Million Dollar was taken over by Frank Fouce, a local Spanish-language theater owner and film distributor. The Million Dollar Theater became the mecca of Spanish-language entertainment in the United States. Dolores del Río, Cantinflas, María Félix, Agustín Lara, José Alfredo Jiménez, José Feliciano, Juan Gabriel, Vicente Fernández, and Celia Cruz are but a few of the artists that worked for Empresa Fouce. It was also the first venue where the late Mexican film star Antonio Aguilar worked with his rodeo horses on stage. This is where it is said he conceived the idea for his large arena rodeo productions.

=== 1950s-1960s ===
In the late 1950s and early 1960s, Fouce went on to found Spanish International Communications Corp., named after his Spanish International Theater Company (which included the Million Dollar and the Mayan Theater, also located in Downtown Los Angeles). This company comprised the first group of Spanish-language and UHF television stations in the U.S.; KMEX Channel 34 in Los Angeles (and, indirectly, the Univision television network) can trace its roots to the Million Dollar Theatre. The Million Dollar and the Fouce family were pioneers in the then-unheard-of Spanish entertainment industry.

For their efforts, Fouce was awarded El Aguila Azteca (Order of the Aztec Eagle), Mexico's highest civilian award, by President Miguel Alemán Valdés. The theater and Fouce were also honored by the Mexican actors' union ANDA for their contributions to the Mexican film, recording, and entertainment industries. In addition to its successful stage productions, the theater was also the most prominent Spanish-language cinema in the United States. Every major Mexican motion picture premiered at the Million Dollar.

The Million Dollar featured mariachi music at its best: Mariachi Vargas, Mariachi Chapala de Leopoldo Sosa y Esteban Hernandez, Mariachi Los Gallos de Crescencio Hernandez, Mariachi Los Galleros de Pedro Rey (Hernandez), Mariachi los Camperos (led by Nati Cano), Mariachi Mexico de Pepe Villa.

=== 1970s-1990s ===
Gonzalo L. Checa, president of the Spanish division of Metropolitan Theatres, was responsible for the upsurge of attendance at the Million Dollar in the 1970s and 1980s due to his great expertise and keen insight of the entertainment needs of the Hispanic community. During this period, the long lines of people waiting to attend the Million Dollar would wrap around the block and cause the Los Angeles Police Department to close down Broadway to traffic.

Checa became a low-profile power broker and behind-the-scenes player, who helped launch the U.S. invasion of stars like Vicente Fernández, José José, Nelson Ned, Juan Gabriel, Julio Alemán, Evita Muñoz ("Chachita"), María Elena Velasco ("La India Maria"), Enrique Cuenca Marquez and Eduardo Manzano ("Los Polivoces"), Raúl Ramírez, Jorge Rivero, Rodolfo de Anda, Eulalio Gonzalez ("El Piporo"), Joan Sebastian, Antonio Aguilar and his wife Flor Silvestre, Gaspar Henaine ("Capulina"), and the famous silver masked wrestler Rodolfo Guzmán Huerta ("El Santo").

Ira Yellin (then the owner of Grand Central Market) acquired the building in 1989.

=== 21st century ===
After serving as the home of a Spanish-language church for some years, as of 2006, the Million Dollar Theatre was empty, although the office building had been recently renovated and converted to residential space. In February 2008, the theater reopened, once again showing live Spanish theatre. It closed again in 2012. In 2017, the building was sold to Langdon Street Capital, and the theater and retail space were briefly leased to fashion startup CoBird.

The theatre is home to special movie screenings that feature historic theatres in the Broadway district of DTLA. The series features classic films in a historical setting.

== In popular culture ==
- The exterior of the theater, along with the Bradbury Building across the street, appear prominently in several films shot on location, including D.O.A. (1949) and Blade Runner (1982)
- The interior of the theater appears prominently in the film The Artist (2011).
- The exterior of the theater appears in Johnny Gill's music video "Fairweather Friend".
- The theatre was featured in the videogame Grand Theft Auto V as the Ten Cent Theater.
- The theater was featured in Michael Connelly's Harry Bosch novel The Overlook as the site of a secret FBI unit, and the site of a climactic shootout.
- The music video for Panic! at the Disco's cover of "Into the Unknown", heard at the end credits for Frozen II, was filmed in the empty interior of the theater.
- The theater was featured as a haunted location on Josh Gates Tonight season 2 episode "Ghostly Gates". Host Josh Gates invites Jack Osborne to investigate the building's claims of paranormal activity.

== Gallery ==
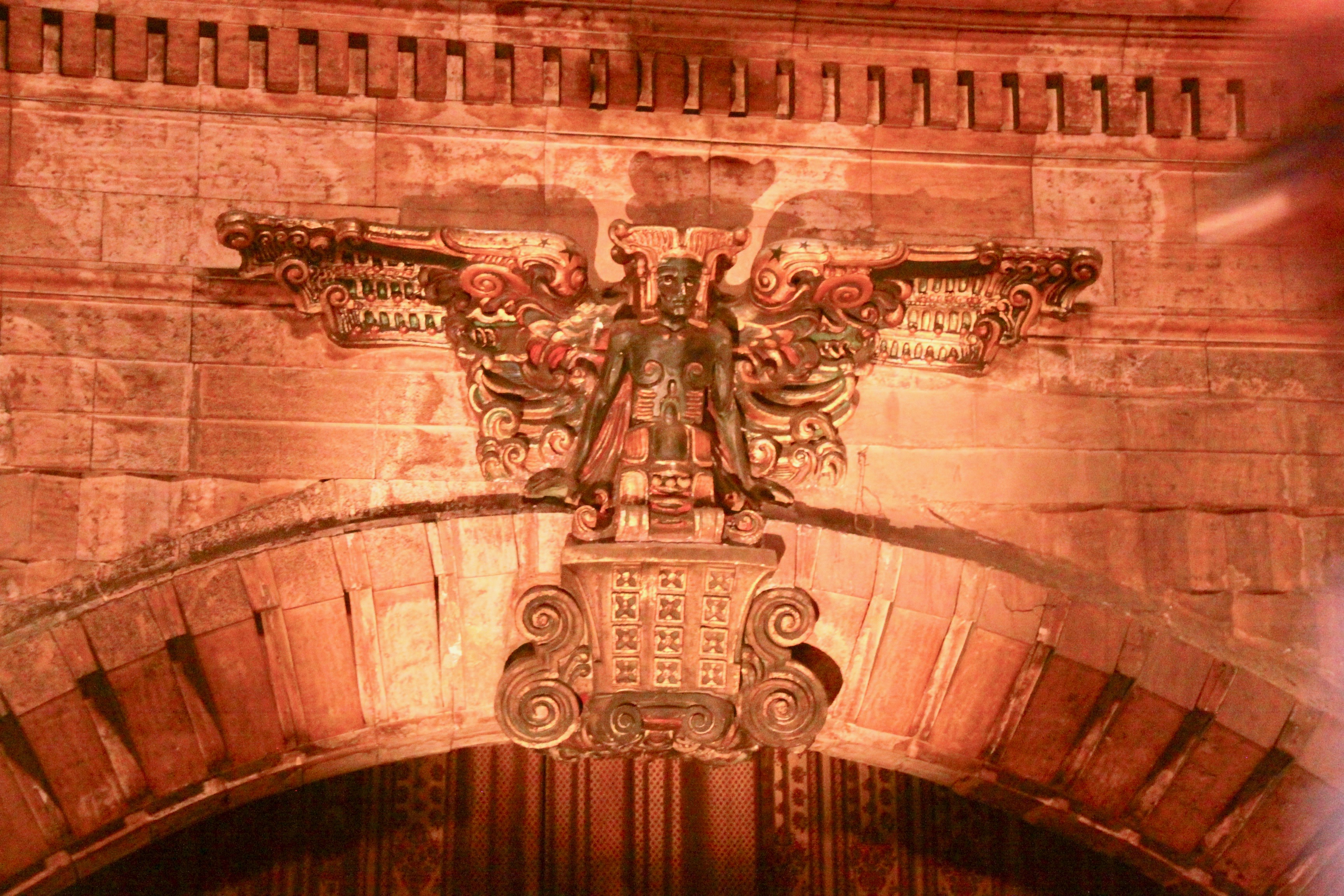
Proscenium embellishment

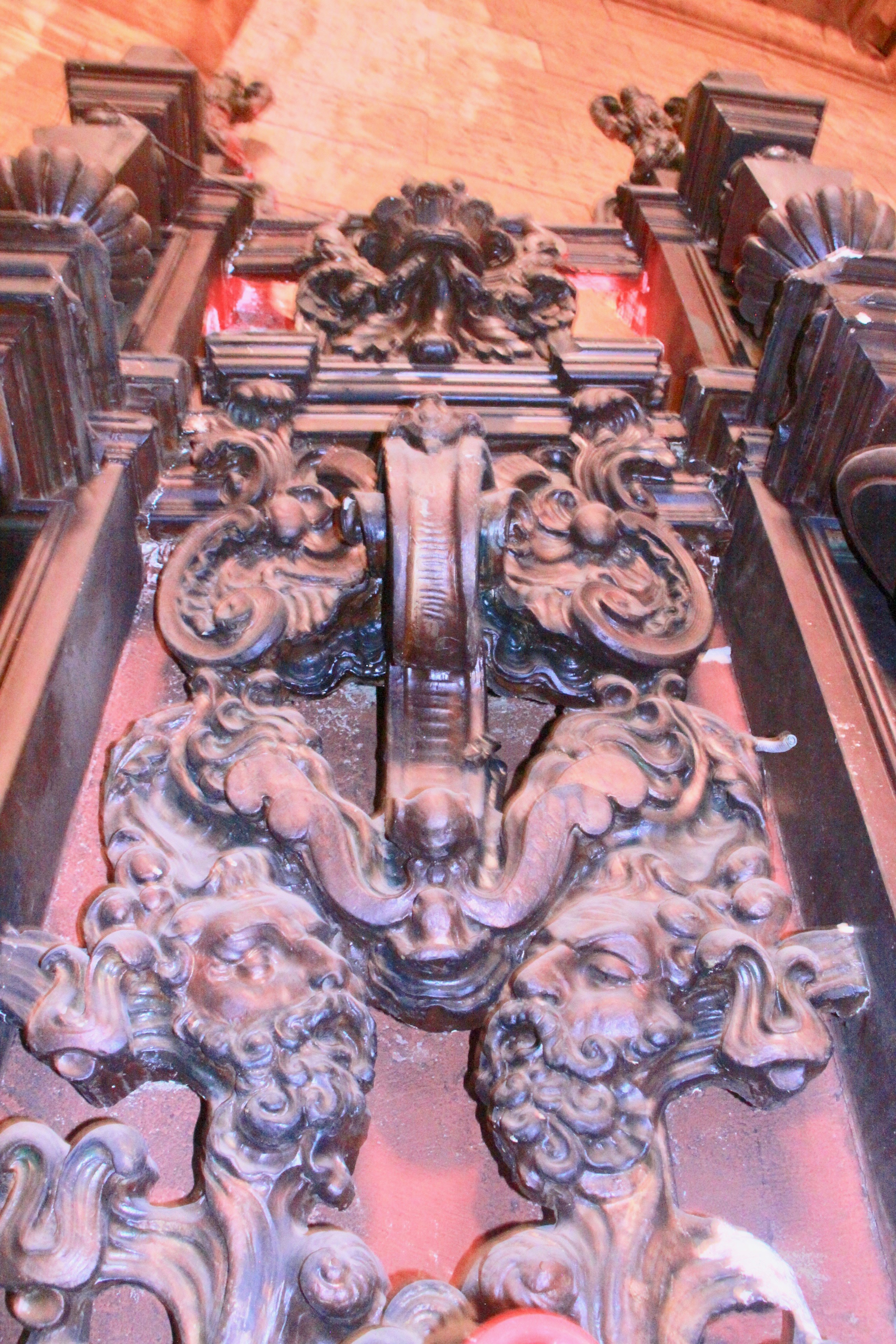
Moldwork detail

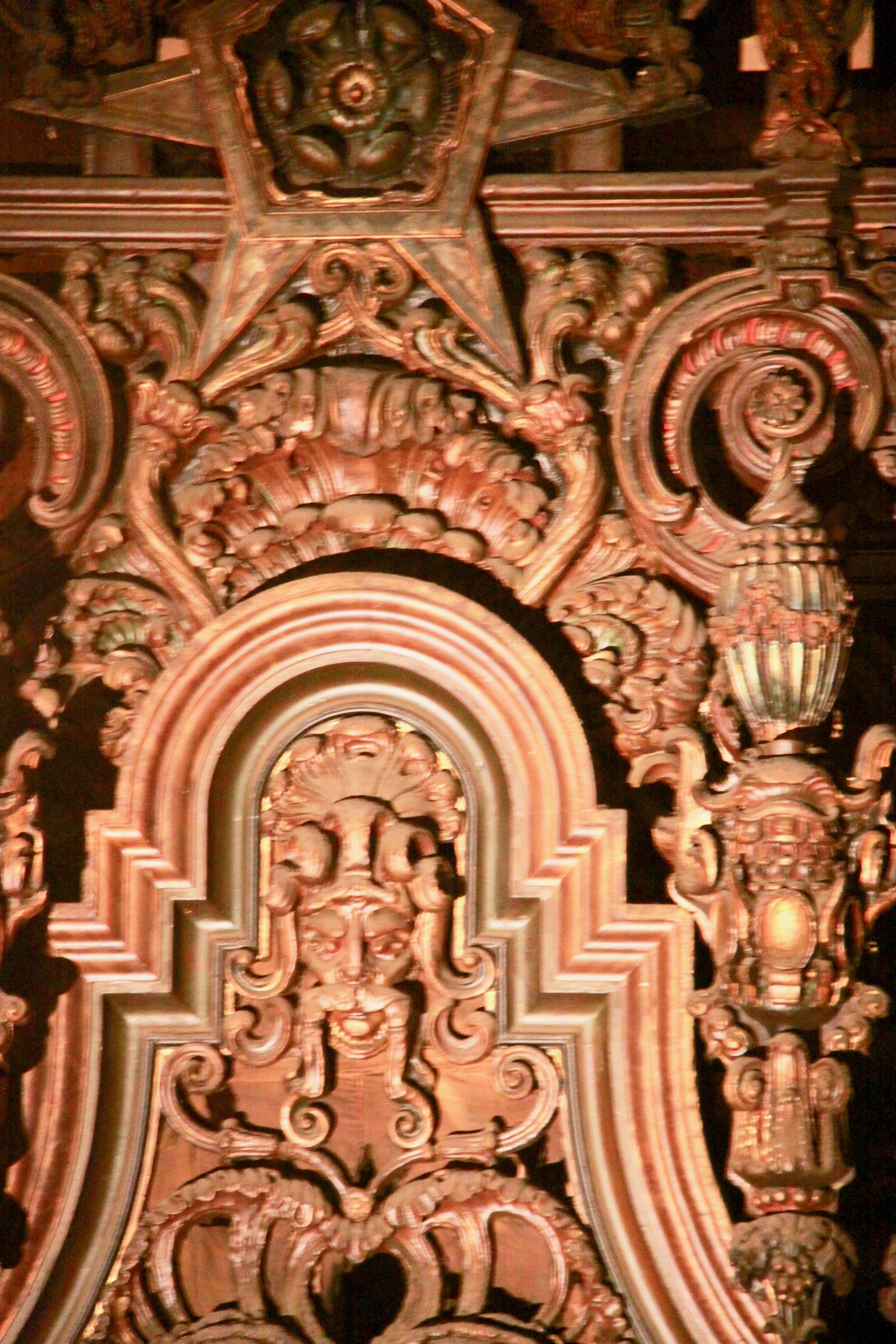
Interior embellishments

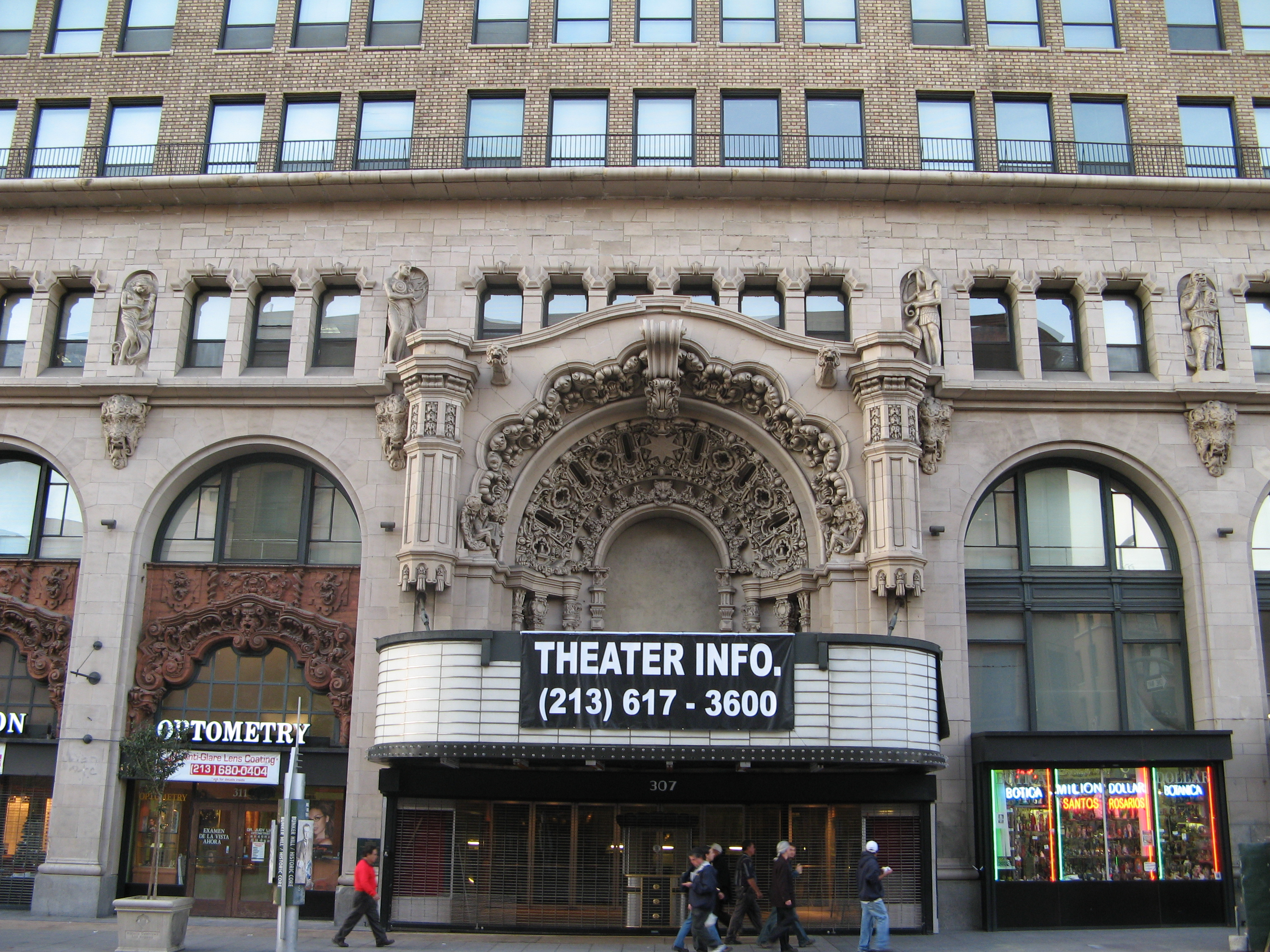
Marquee

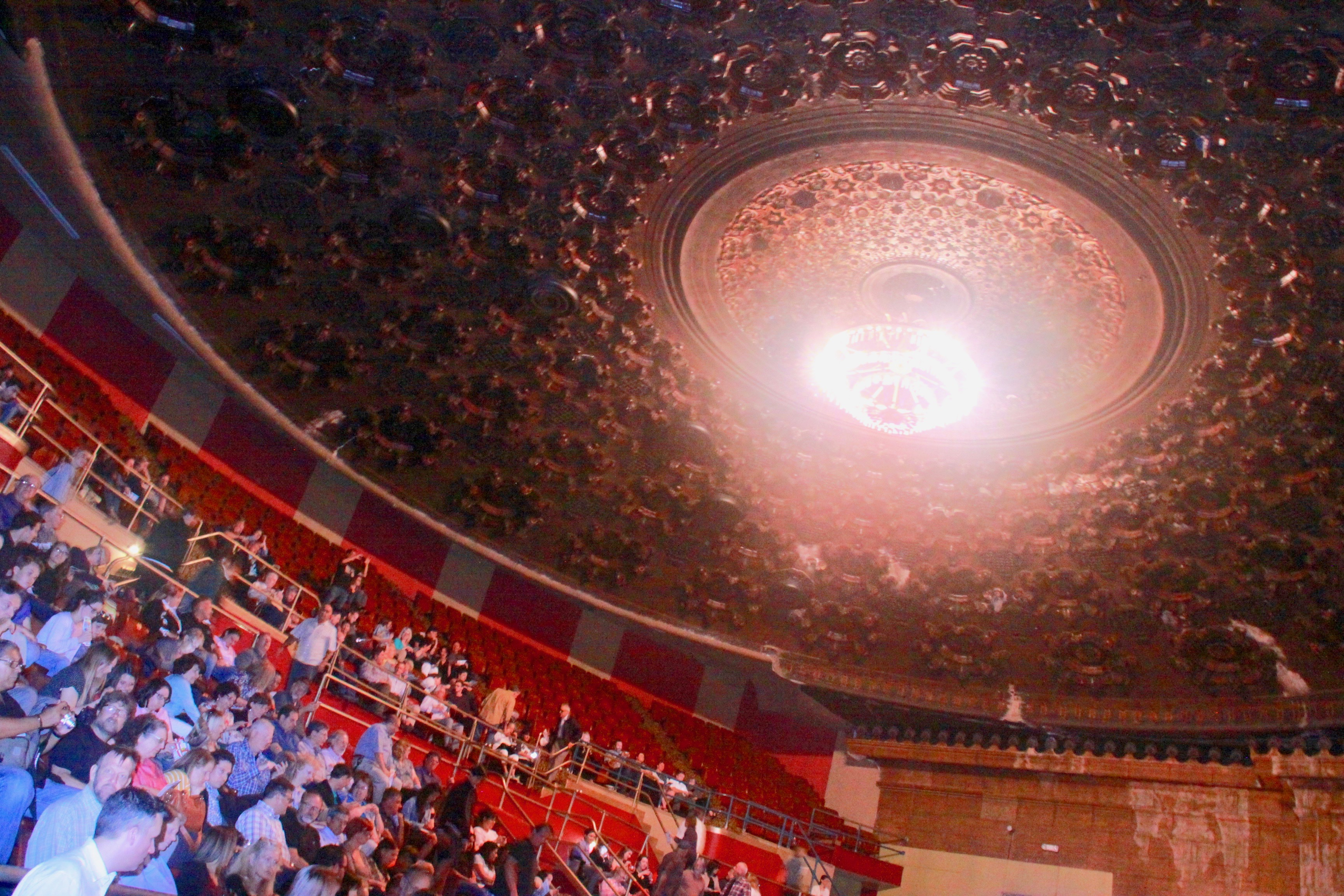
Interior

== See also ==
- Broadway (Los Angeles)
- Broadway Theater and Commercial District
- List of Los Angeles Historic-Cultural Monuments in Downtown Los Angeles
- List of contributing properties in the Broadway Theater and Commercial District
- Los Angeles Theatre
- Orpheum Theatre (Los Angeles)
- Tower Theatre (Los Angeles)
