= H. L. Gumbiner =

American theatre proprietor

Herman Louis Gumbiner (1879–1952) was a theater proprietor in Chicago and then Los Angeles. The movie theaters his business ran in Chicago and Hammon, Indiana were part of the first wave of the moving picture business. In Los Angeles he was an innovator in theater design and major pictures debuted at his theaters.

He leased the Germania Theatre on North Clark Street in Chicago and operated other theaters with his brothers in Chicago and Hammond, Indiana.

From Chicago he moved to Los Angeles in 1921. Architect S. Charles Lee sold him on an unorthodox design for a tight space and got the City of Los Angeles to approve. They did another project afterwards. An independent operator he struggled to compete with theaters owned by major studios. He went bankrupt.

He owned the Cameo and Garrick theaters. He had the Garrick torn down and built the air-conditioned Tower Theatre. He also opened the Los Angeles Theatre. The Online Archive of California has a collection of papers related to his theaters.

He lived at 715 South Normndie Avenue. He had a wife, son, and daughter.

== See also ==
Broadway Theater District (Los Angeles)
