= Regent Theatre (Los Angeles) =

Historic former movie theater in Los Angeles

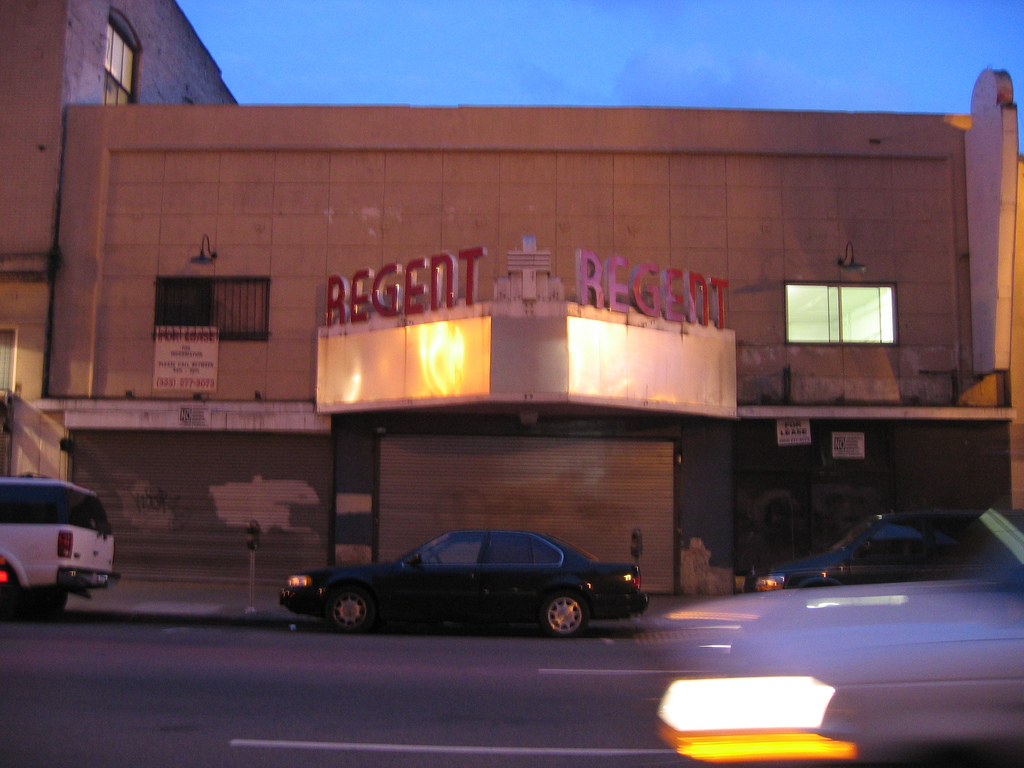
- The Regent's exterior in 2006
- Interactive map of Regent Theatre
- Former names: National Theatre
- Address: 448 S Main Street; Los Angeles, California; United States
- Coordinates: 34°02′49″N 118°14′53″W
- Operator: Live Nation

Construction
- Opened: February 1914; 112 years ago
- Years active: 1914–2000; 2014–present

The Regent Theatre is a live music venue and historic former movie theater in the Downtown section of Los Angeles, California. Opened as the National Theatre in 1914, it is the oldest remaining theater building on South Main Street. Following its initial status as a first-run filmhouse, it began screening second-run programming in the 1920s amidst a widespread decline of the vicinity's entertainment scene in favor of the newer Broadway Theater District. After serving as a grindhouse, the Regent was later converted to an adult movie theater before shuttering in 2000. Upon the completion of renovations, the facility was reopened as a concert venue in 2014.

== History ==
In the 1910s, Main Street in Los Angeles was home to about 20 small theaters. The National Theatre opened in February 1914, replacing a smaller predecessor of the same name. In 1917, the National was renamed as the Regent Theatre. In the 1920s, the emerging Broadway Theater District and its newer, more luxurious movie palaces began drawing crowds away from the Main Street theater collection, including the Regent. In turn, the venue's programming was changed from first-run films to second-run films.

Later in its tenure as a movie theater, the Regent served as a grindhouse and ultimately became an all-night adult movie theater. The venue ceased its operation as a cinema in 2000 after 86 years. The building remained unused until 2006 when a local developer acquired the lease and used it occasionally for performing arts events.

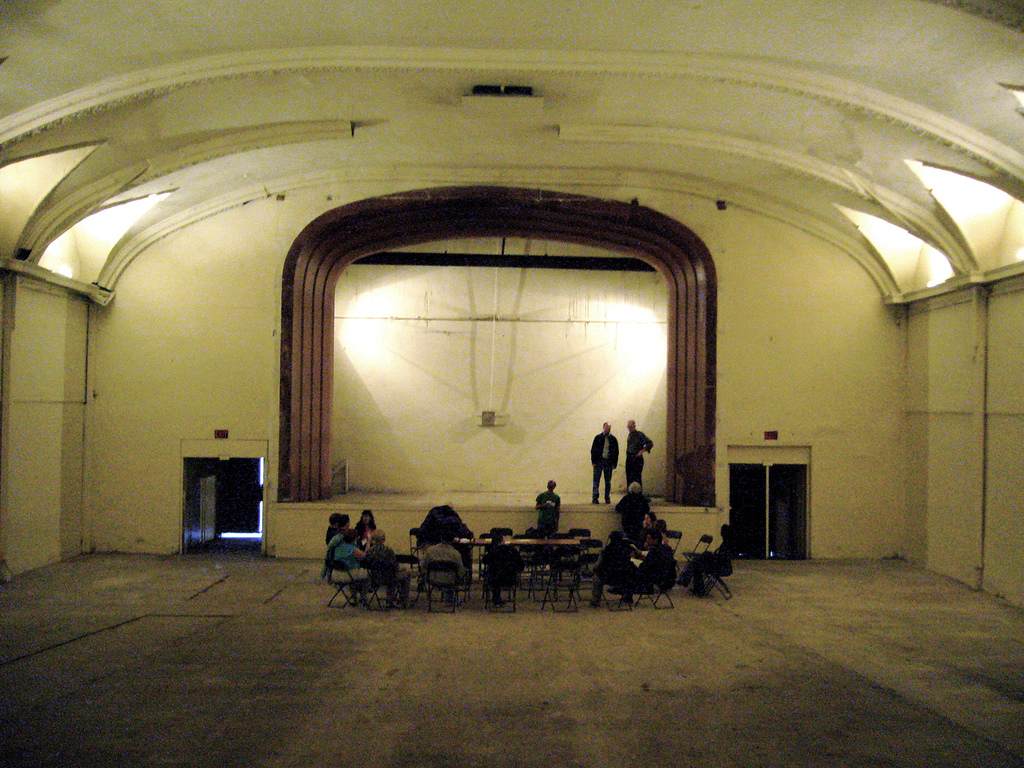
Meeting of the Los Angeles Conservancy at the Regent Theatre, 2007

In 2012, music promoter Mitchell Frank acquired the lease through his company Spaceland Productions. Following renovations, the Regent reopened as a music venue in November 2014. In May 2019, Live Nation became the operator of the Regent via its acquisition of Spaceland Productions.

== Architecture ==
The Regent Theatre was designed by an unknown architect in the Gothic Revival style. The original 1914 facade consisted of white terra cotta and a pediment. During a renovation in the early 1940s, a Moderne style facade was installed and the marquee was replaced. The auditorium went unchanged, retaining its original Gothic look. In its original configuration, the Regent sat 600 people.

Knitting Factory Entertainment and Artist & Recreation provided renovation services for lessee Spaceland Productions beginning in 2012. In the process, seats were removed and a mezzanine was constructed to boost capacity to 1,100. The building received seismic retrofitting and the auditorium's Gothic ornamentation was preserved.

== In popular culture ==
- The Regent is depicted as a Chicago theater in a 1974 episode of Kolchak: The Night Stalker.
- An episode of Baretta from 1975 features the Regent Theatre.
- In the 1995 neo-noir mystery film Devil in a Blue Dress includes the Regent as part of its setting.
- In the 2016 musical romance film La La Land, the Regent Theatre is featured as the setting in a band photoshoot scene.
