= Broadway Theater District (Los Angeles) =

- U.S. National Register of Historic Places
- U.S. Historic district
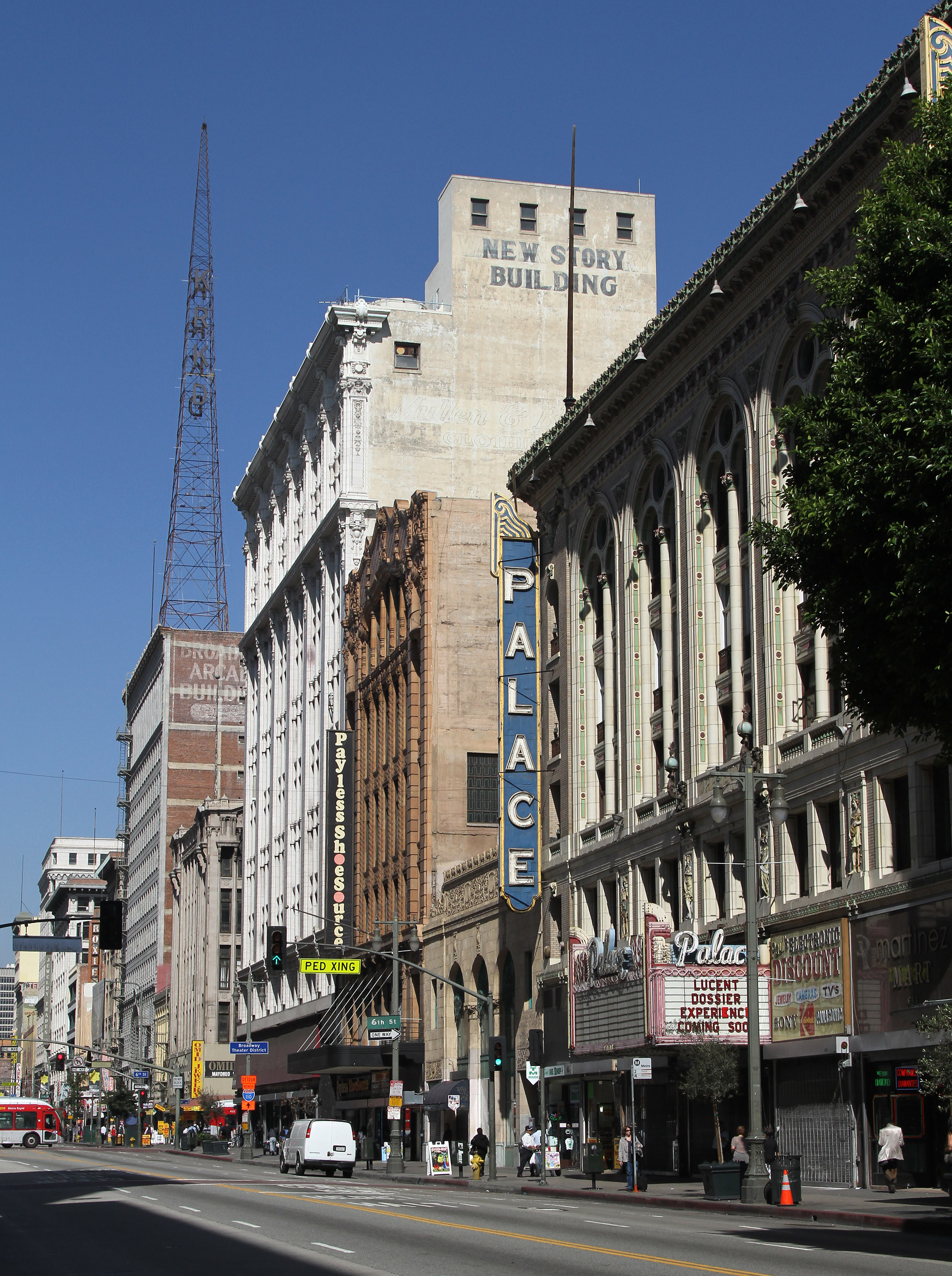
- Broadway Theater District streetscape

- Location within Los Angeles
- Location: 300—933 S. Broadway, Los Angeles, California
- Coordinates: 34°2′48″N 118°15′4″W
- Architect: Multiple
- Architectural style: Early Commercial, Late 19th And 20th Century Revivals, Art Deco
- NRHP reference No.: 79000484
- Added to NRHP: May 9, 1979

Broadway Theater District, referred to as Broadway Theater and Commercial District in the National Register of Historic Places and Broadway Theater and Entertainment District by the City of Los Angeles Planning Department, is a historic theater district located on Broadway in the historic core of downtown Los Angeles. The district, the first and largest theater district listed on the National Register of Historic Places, contains twelve movie palaces along an eight-block stretch and is the only large concentration of movie palaces left in the United States.

The district along with an adjacent section of Seventh Street was also Los Angeles's retail hub for the first half of the twentieth century.

== Description ==
Los Angeles's Broadway Theater District stretches for eight blocks from Second Street to Olympic Boulevard along South Broadway in the historic core of downtown Los Angeles. These blocks contain twelve theaters built between 1910 and 1931 and numerous department store buildings, the latter of which made the area the shopping center of greater Los Angeles for much of the first half of the twentieth century.

In 1986, Los Angeles Times columnist Jack Smith called the district "the only large concentration of vintage movie theaters left in America."

== History ==
=== Golden Age ===
The district's oldest surviving theater was built in 1910, and by 1931, the district had the highest concentration of cinemas in the world, with seating capacity for more than 15,000 patrons. At the time, Broadway was the hub of L.A.'s entertainment scene – a place where "screen goddesses and guys in fedoras rubbed elbows with Army nurses and aircraft pioneers." In 2006, the Los Angeles Times wrote:

"There was a time, long ago, when the streets of downtown Los Angeles were awash in neon—thanks to a confluence of movie theaters the world had never seen before. Dozens of theaters screened Hollywood's latest fare, played host to star-studded premieres and were filled nightly with thousands of moviegoers. In those days, before World War II, downtown L.A. was the movie capital of the world."

Los Angeles Times columnist Jack Smith recalled growing up a mile from Broadway around this time and spending his Saturdays in the theaters:

"I remember walking into those opulent interiors, surrounded by the glory of the Renaissance, or the age of Baroque, and spending two or three hours in the dream world of the movies. When I came out again the sky blazed; the heat bounced off the sidewalk, traffic sounds filled the street, I was back in the hard reality of the Depression.

Additionally, from c. 1905 through the 1950s, Broadway's theater district was considered the center for shopping in greater Los Angeles, with more than 3,400,000 sq ft (320,000 m^{2}) in department store space.

=== Decline and revitalization ===
In the years after World War II, the district began to decline, as first-run movie-goers shifted to the movie palaces in Hollywood, in Westwood Village, and later to suburban multiplexes, while department store shopping moved to shopping malls. After World War II, as Anglo shoppers and moviegoers moved to the suburbs, many of the Broadway department stores closed and its movie palaces became venues for Spanish-language movies and variety shows. In 1988, the Los Angeles Times noted that without the Hispanic community "Broadway would be dead" and that Broadway had been "rescued and revitalized" by "the Latino renaissance."

=== Preservation and renovation ===
The district has been the subject of preservation and restoration efforts since the 1980s. In 1987, the Los Angeles Conservancy started a program called "Last Remaining Seats" in which the old movie palaces were opened each summer to show classic Hollywood movies. In 1994, the Conservancy's associate director, Gregg Davidson, noted: "When we started this, the naysayers said no one will go downtown to an old theater to see an old movie in the middle of the summer, but we get a number of people who have never seen a movie in a theater with a balcony. The older people (go) for nostalgia. And the movie people—seeing a classic film on a big screen is a different experience." After attending a Conservancy screening, one writer noted: "The other night I went to the movies and was transported to a world of powdered wigs and hoop skirts, a rococo fantasy of gilded cherubs and crystal chandeliers. And then the film started."

Despite preservation efforts, many of the theaters have been converted to other uses, including flea markets and churches. The Broadway movie palaces fell victim to a number of circumstances, including changing demographics and tastes, a downtown location that was perceived as dangerous at night, and high maintenance costs for aging facilities. With the closure of the State Theater in 1998, the Orpheum and the Palace were the only two still screening films. Additionally, while Broadway's theaters were being renovated or converted, almost all of the district's department store buildings were converted to office or residential.

In 2008, the City of Los Angeles launched a $40-million campaign to revitalize the theater district, known as the "Bringing Back Broadway" campaign. Some Latino merchants in the district expressed concern that the campaign was an effort to spread the largely Anglo gentrification taking hold in other parts of downtown to an area that has become the city's leading Latino shopping district. In 2018, Marcus Lovingood started Broadway West, a nonprofit dedicated to activating the theater district and bringing the street back to its former glory.

== Theaters ==
=== Surviving ===
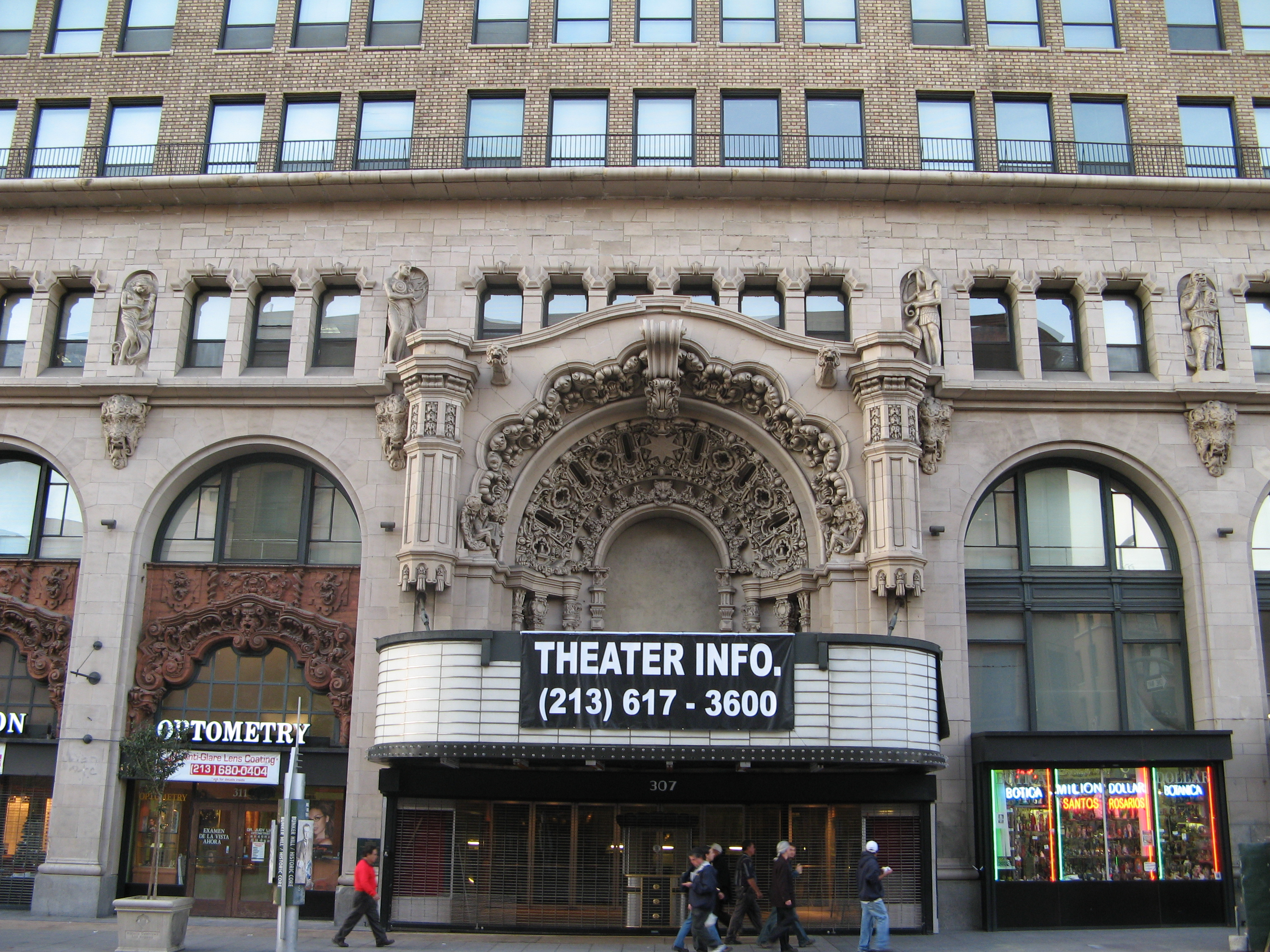
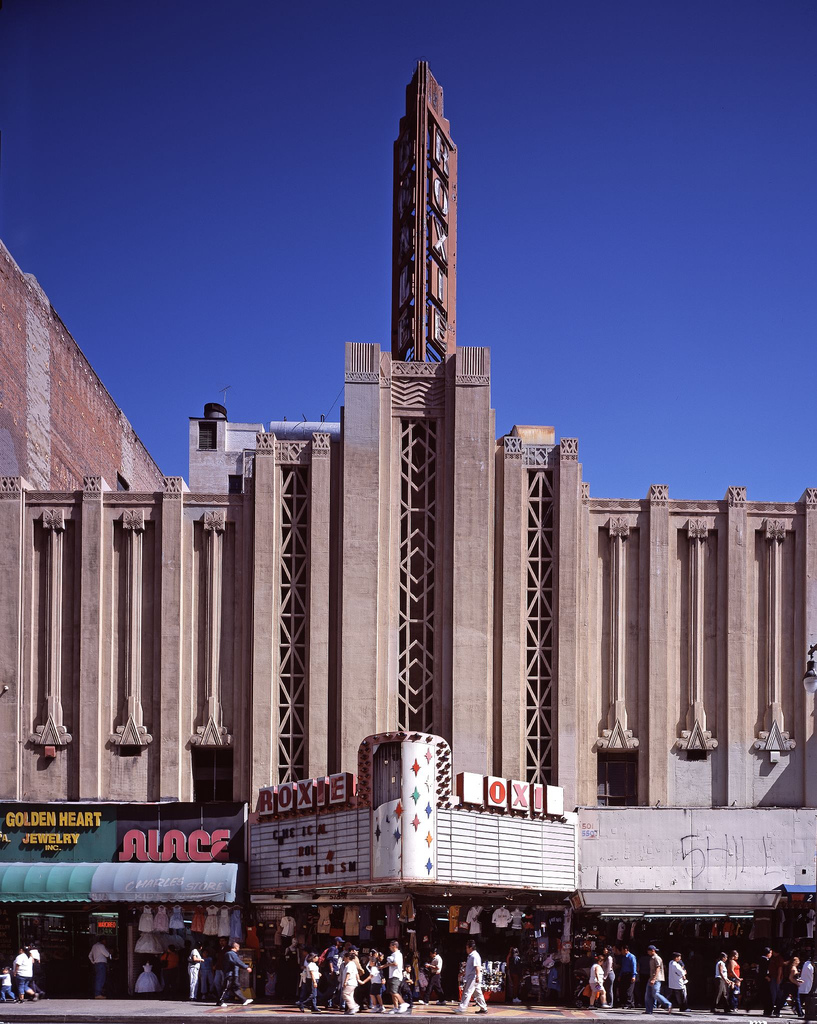
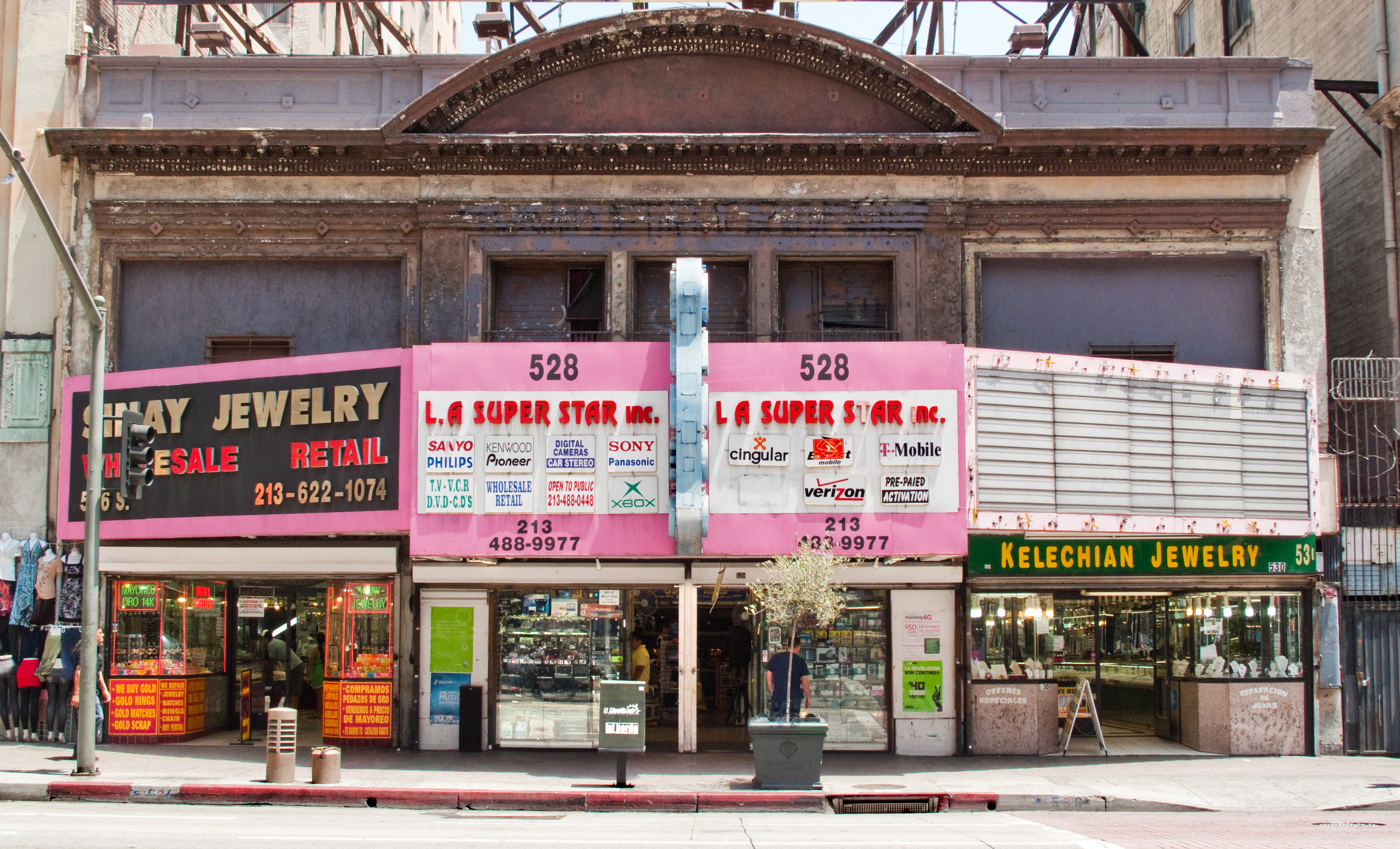
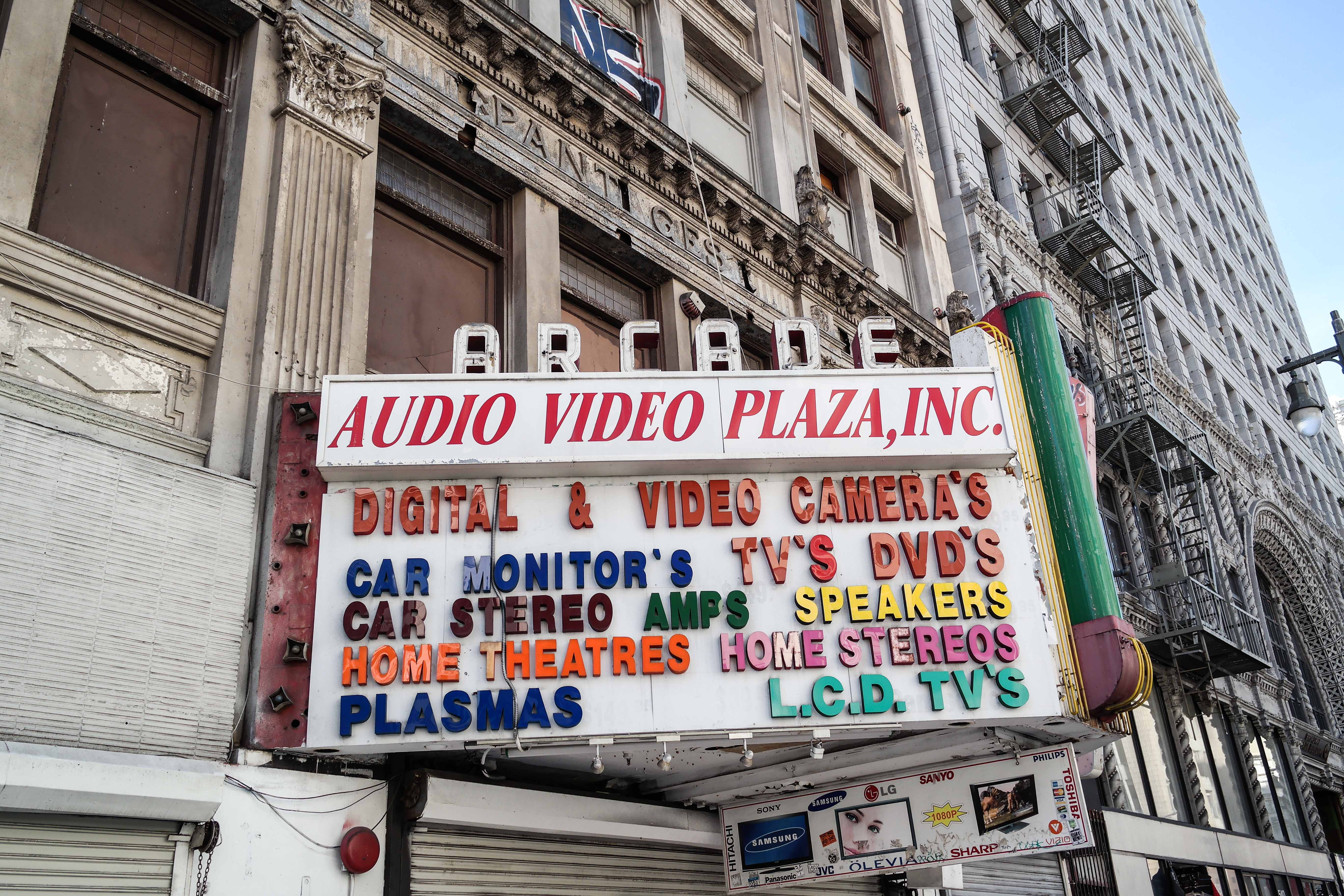
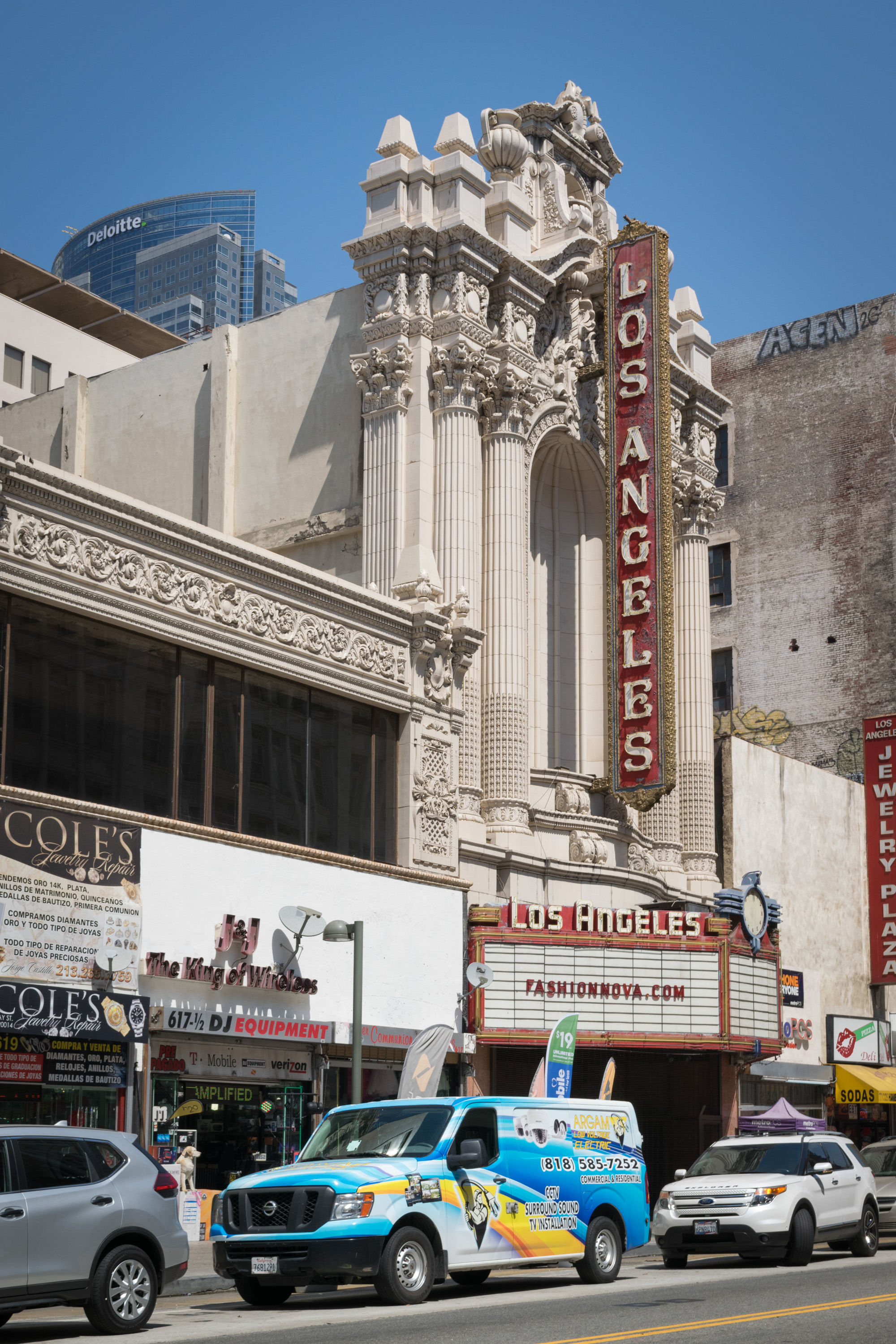
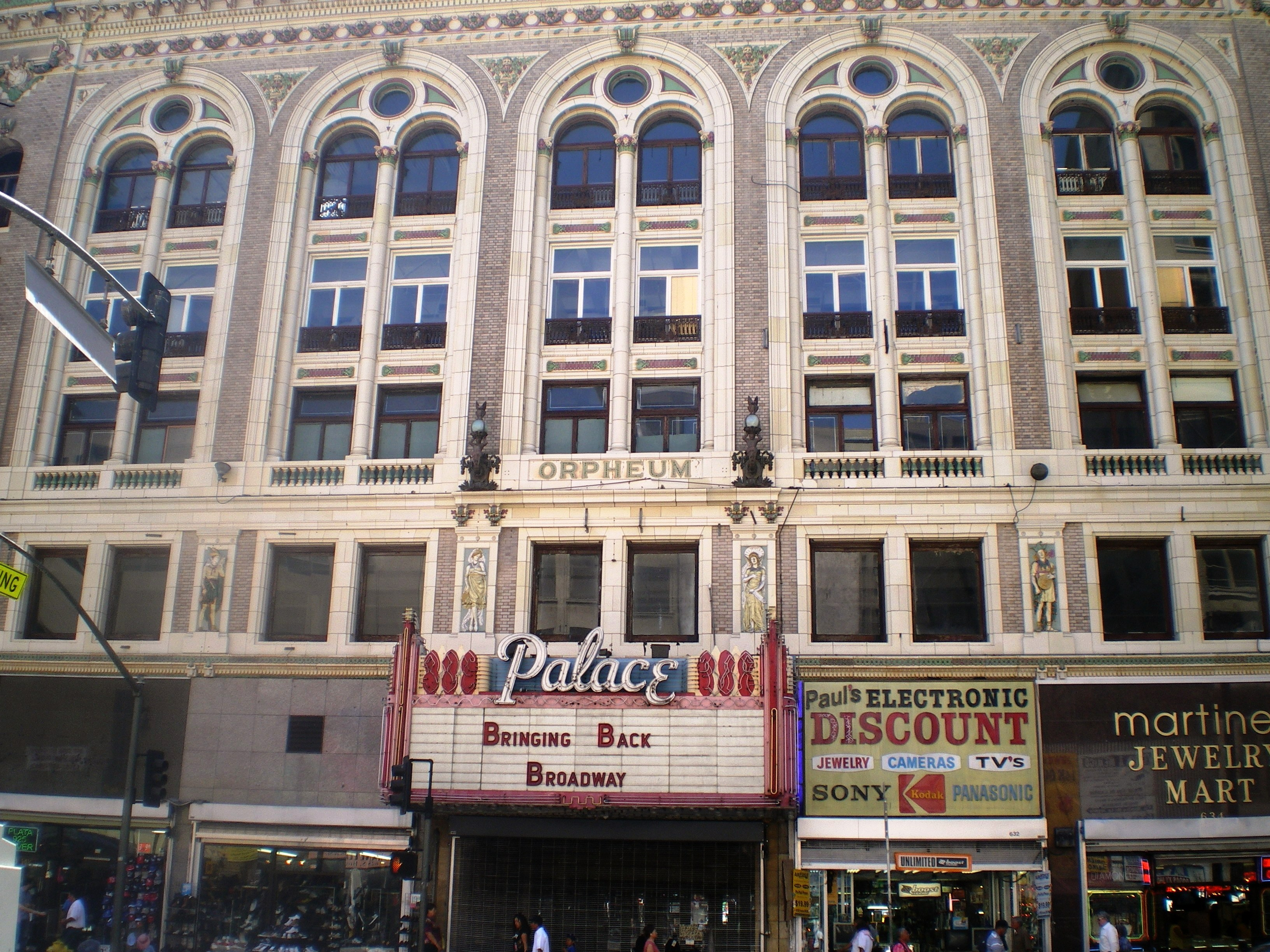
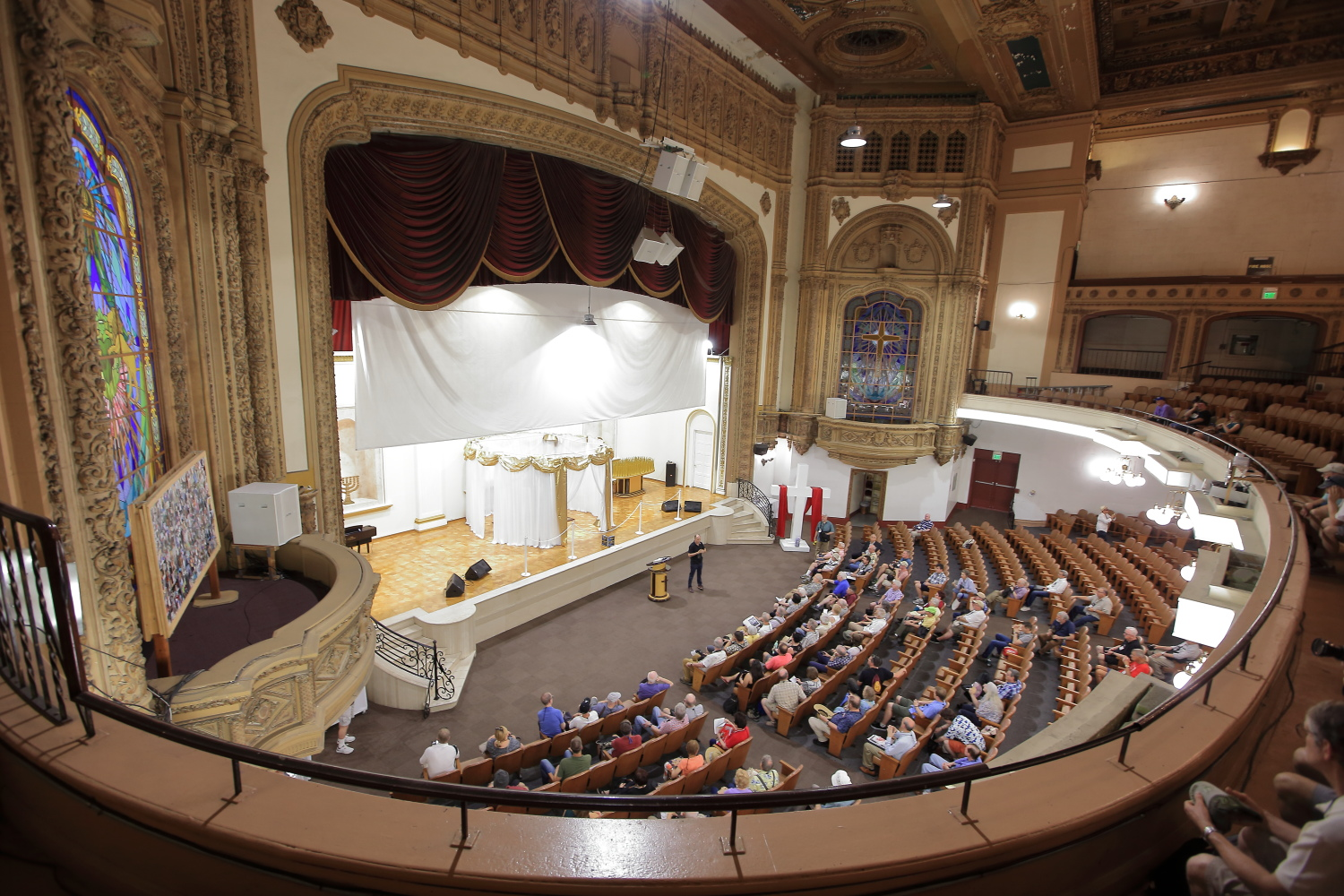
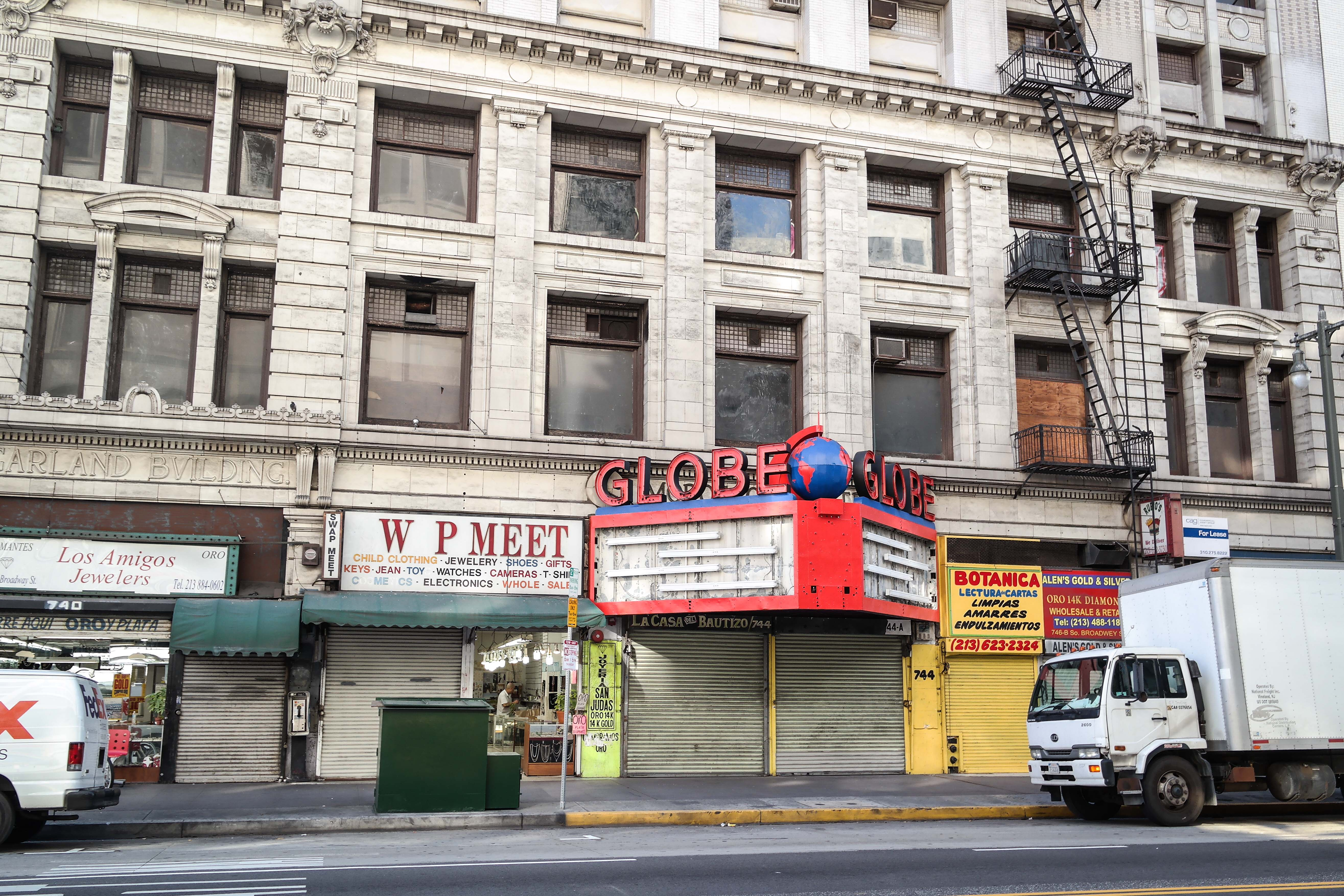
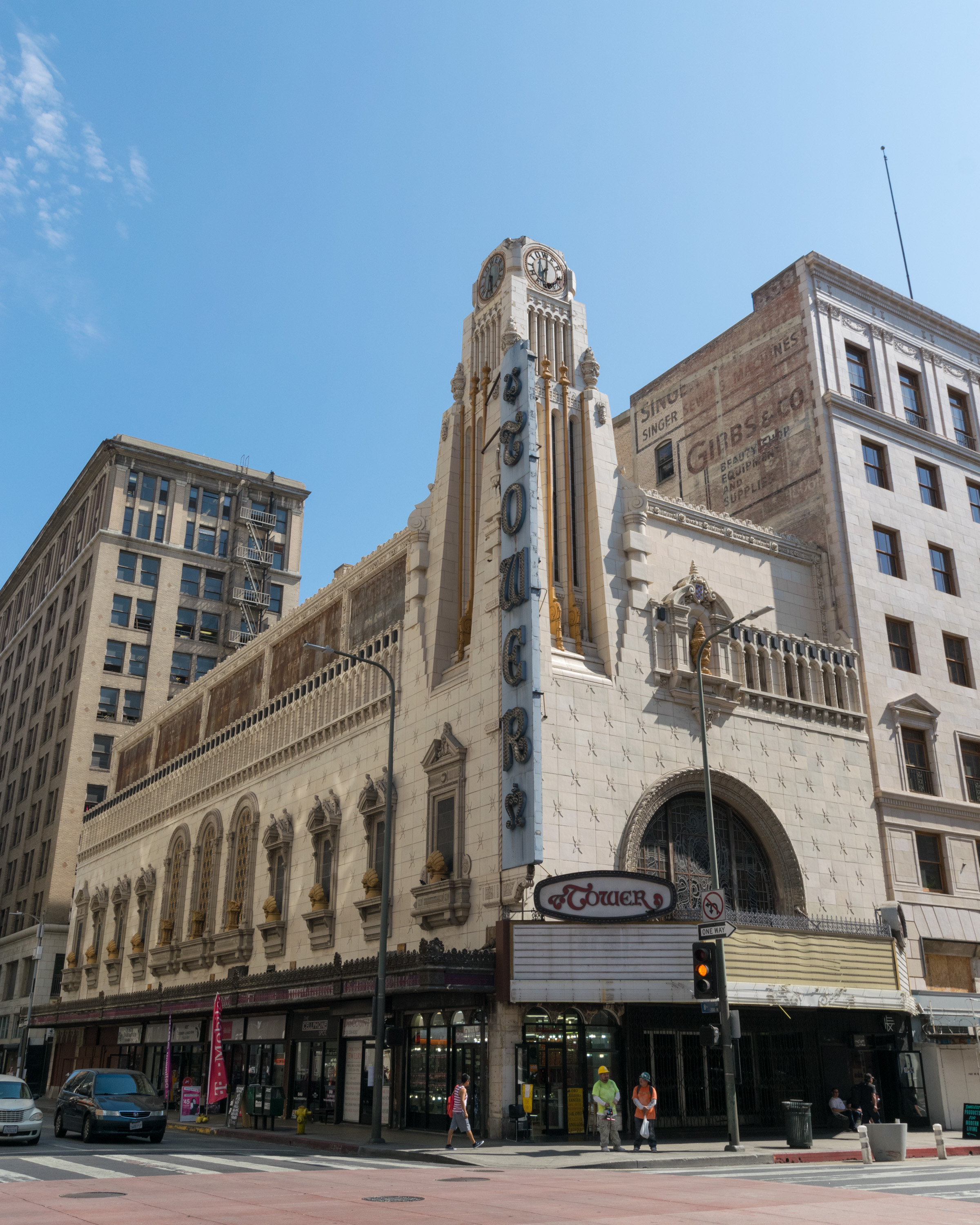
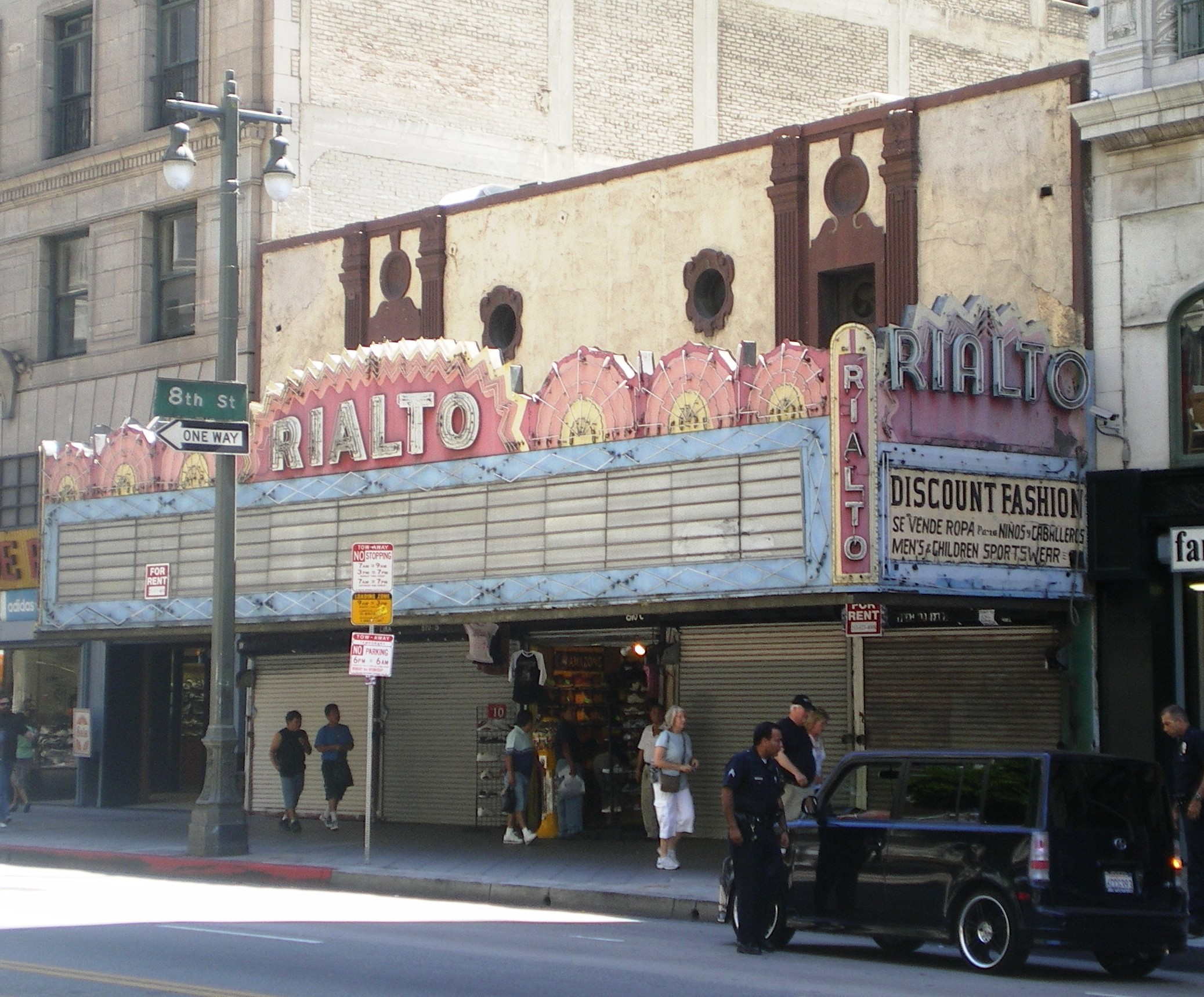
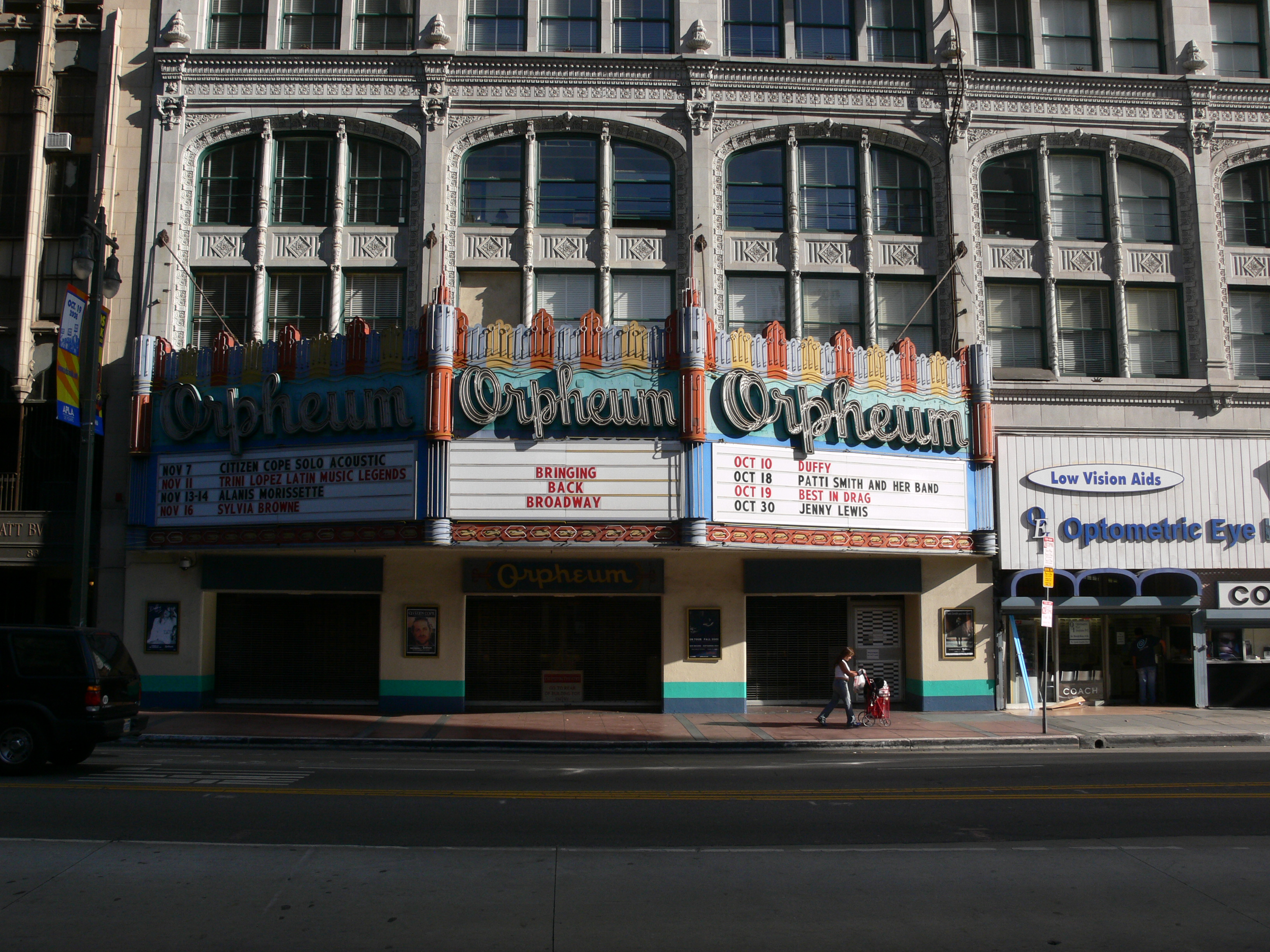
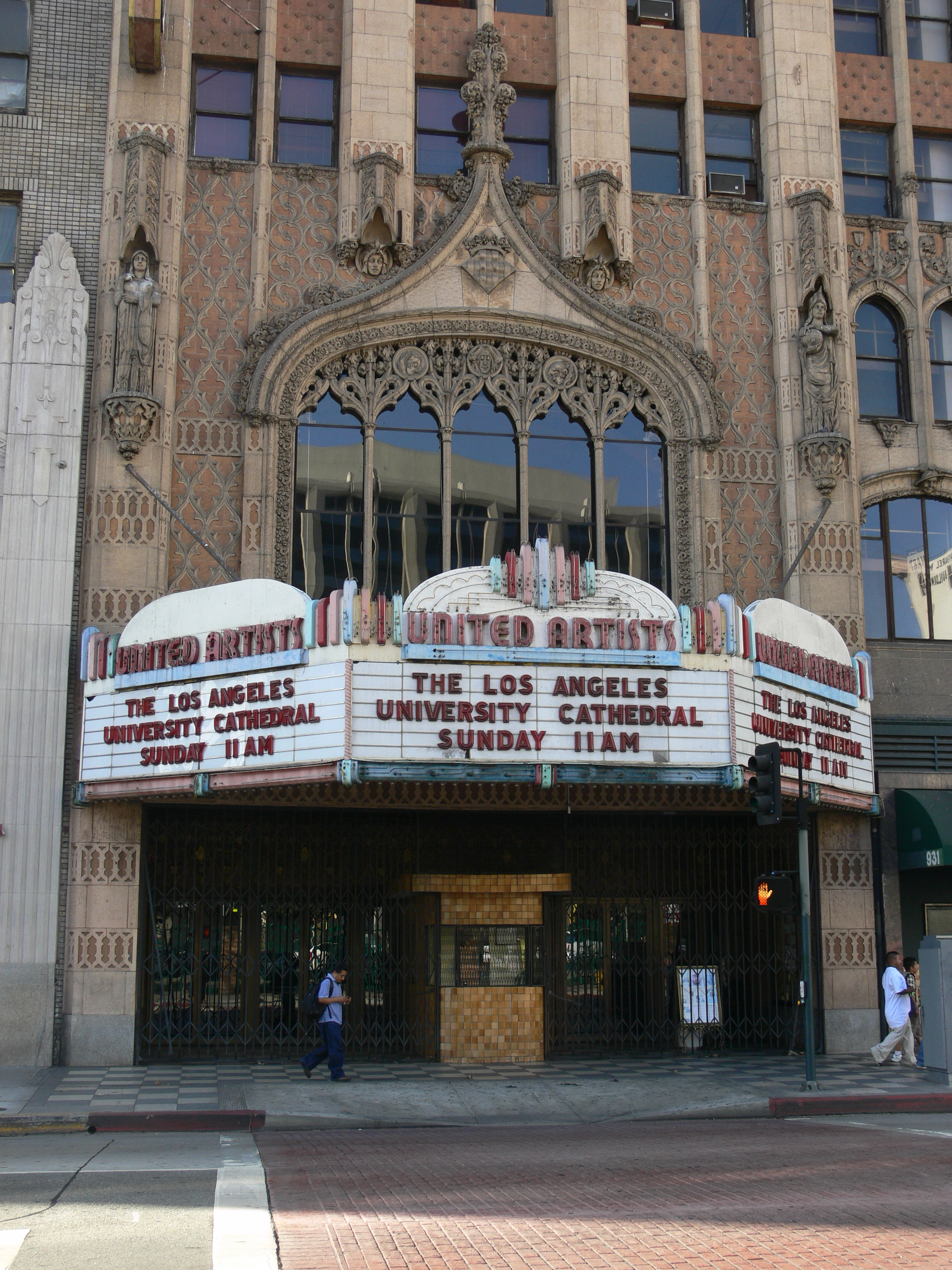
(Left to right, top to bottom) Million Dollar, Roxie, Cameo, Arcade, Los Angeles, Palace, State, Globe, Tower, Rialto, Orpheum, and United Artists theaters

The twelve theaters in the Broadway Theater District from north to south are:

- Million Dollar – Movie palace – 307 S. Broadway. Designed by Albert C. Martin Sr. and William Lee Woollett for Sid Grauman, opened in 1918, sat 2,345. Spanish Colonial Revival design.
- Roxie – Movie palace – 518 S. Broadway. Designed by John M. Cooper, opened in 1932, sat 1,600, converted to retail in 1989. Zigzag Moderne design.
- Cameo – Nickelodeon – 528 S. Broadway. Designed by Alfred Rosenheim for W. H. Clune, opened in 1910, sat 775, converted to retail in 1991. Renaissance Revival design.
- Arcade – Vaudeville and music hall then burlesque then movies – 534 S. Broadway. Designed by Morgan & Walls for Alexander Pantages, opened in 1910, originally part of the Pantages circuit, renovated by Oscar N. Land in 1927, converted to burlesque in 1932, movies in 1941, and retail in 1992. Beaux Arts design.
- Los Angeles – Movie palace – 615 S. Broadway. Designed by S. Charles Lee and S. Tilden Norton for H. L. Gumbiner, opened in 1931, sat slightly less than 2,000 at opening, currently seats 1,931. French Baroque design.
- Palace – Vaudeville theater and movie palace – 630 S. Broadway. Designed by G. Albert Lansburgh and Robert Brown Young, opened in 1911, originally part of the Orpheum circuit, sat 2,200 at opening, converted to movies in 1926, currently seats 1,068. Florentine early Renaissance design.
- State – Vaudeville theater and movie palace – 703 S. Broadway. Designed by Weeks and Day, opened in 1921, sat 2,450, converted to a church in 1998. Beaux Arts design.
- Globe – Legitimate theater then movies – 744 S. Broadway. Designed by Morgan, Walls & Morgan (exterior) and Alfred F. Rosenheim (interior) for Oliver Morosco, opened in 1913, sat 782, converted to movies during the Great Depression, retail in 1987, and an event space c. 2014. Now seats 2,000. Beaux Arts design.
- Tower – Movie theater – 802 S. Broadway. Designed by S. Charles Lee for H. L. Gumbiner, opened in 1927, sat 1,000, converted to retail in 2021. Baroque Revival design.
- Rialto – Nickelodeon – 812 S. Broadway. Designed by Oliver Perry Dennis, opened in 1917, bought by Sid Grauman in 1919, remodeled by William Lee Woollett in 1923, bought by Paramount Pictures in 1924, converted to retail c. 1990. Originally Greek Revival design, remodeled to Georgian Revival, Art Deco marquee added later
- Orpheum – Vaudeville theater, concert hall, and movie palace – 842 S. Broadway. Designed by G. Albert Lansburgh, opened in 1926, originally part of the Orpheum circuit. Beaux Arts design.
- United Artists – Concert hall and movie palace – 933 S. Broadway. Designed by C. Howard Crane of Walker & Eisen for United Artists, opened in 1927, sat 2,214, converted to a church in 1990 then back to a theater in 2014, upper floors converted to a hotel in 2013. Gothic design.

Of these theaters, only United Artists was not included in the 1979 NRHP listed Broadway Theater and Commercial District. That theare, however, was added when the district was expanded in 2002.

=== Nearby surviving ===
- Arrow Theater – Movie theater then burlesque then movies again – 251. S. Main St. Opened in 1924, sat 500, renamed in the 1940s, closed 1980s, re-opened 2007, re-closed 2020.
- Regent – Movie theater then concert venue – 448 S. Main St. Opened in 1914 as National Theater, sat 600, remodeled early 1940s, closed as a movie theater in 2000, re-opened as a 1,100 seat concert venue in 2014.
- Warner Bros. Downtown – Vaudeville theater and movie palace – 401 W. 7th St. Designed by B. Marcus Priteca for Alexander Pantages, opened in 1920, originally part of the Pantages Circuit, sat 2,200, bought by Warner Brothers in 1929, converted to a church in 1975 and retail in 1978. Beaux Arts design.
- Olympic – Movie theater – 313 W. 8th St. Designed by Lewis Arthur Smith for Louis L. Bard, opened in 1927, sat 600, remodeled by Charles Matcham in 1942, converted to retail in 2007.
- Mayan – Vaudeville theater and movie palace – 1014 S. Hill St. Designed by Stiles O. Clements of Morgan, Walls & Clements for Edward L. Doheny, opened in 1927, converted to a nightclub in 1990, capacity 1,491. Mayan Revival design.
- Belasco – Legitimate theater then movie palace then concert hall – 1050 S. Hill St. Designed by Stiles O. Clements of Morgan, Walls and Clements for Edward L. Doheny, opened in 1926, converted to movies in 1948, a church in 1950, and a concert hall in 2011. Spanish Colonial Revival design.

=== Demolished ===
==== On Broadway ====
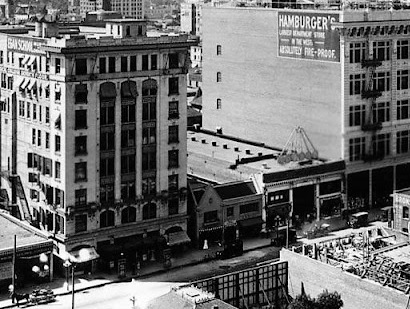
Majestic Theatre (left) and Tally's Broadway (right) in 1913. One other business separates them. Woodley Theatre (lower-right) is under construction across the street.

- Mason – Legitimate theater then movies – 127 S. Broadway. Designed by Benjamin Howard Marshall, opened in 1903, sat 1,600, remodeled by Meyer and Holler in the 1920s, converted to movies in 1945, demolished in 1955.
- Central – Movie theater – 314 S. Broadway
- Cozy/Astro – Movie theater – 320 S. Broadway. Opened in an existing building c. 1927, closed c. 1980
- Broadway – Movie theater – 424 S. Broadway on the ground floor of the Judson-Rives Building. Designed by Lawrence McConville for Metropolitan Theatres, opened in 1925, closed in 1988.
- Clune’s Exclusive/Shell – Movie theater – 547 S. Broadway. Opened in 1909, demolition date unknown.
- Tally's New Broadway – Vaudeville theater then movies – 554 S. Broadway. Designed by Robert Rowan for Alfred Morganstern, opened in 1903, bought by Thomas Lincoln Tally and converted to movies in 1906, closed in 1910, demolished in 1920. Sat 600 for vaudeville, 500 for movies.
- Garrick – Live theater then movies – 802 S. Broadway. Designed by Train and Williams for Arthur S. Hyman, opened in c. 1911, sat 900, redesigned by George Bergstrom in 1921, replaced by Tower Theatre in 1927.
- Tally's Broadway – Movie theater – 833 S. Broadway. Owned by Thomas Lincoln Tally, opened in 1910, sat 900, demolished in 1928.
- Woodley – Movie theater – 838 S. Broadway. Designed by Train and Williams, opened in 1913, sat 900, re-constructed by Frank Meline Company in 1920, closed and demolished in 1925.
- Majestic – Legitimate theater then vaudeville, movies, and burlesque – 845 S. Broadway. Designed by Edelman & Barnett for Asher Hamburger, opened in 1908, sat 1,600, demolished in 1933.

==== Nearby ====
- Grand Opera House – Legitimate theater then movies – 110 S. Main St. Designed by Ezra F. Kysor and Octavius Morgan for Ozro W. Childs, opened in 1884, sat 1,311, demolished in 1936.
- Tally's Electric – Movie theater, later added vaudeville – 262 S. Main St. Owned by Thomas L. Tally, opened in 1902, closing and demolition date unknown.
- Follies – Legitimate turned vaudeville and movies turned burlesque – 337 S. Main St. Designed by Abram M. Edelman for David Belasco, opened in 1904, sat 1,200 later reduced to 900, converted to vaudeville and movies in 1912 and burlesque in 1919, remodeled in the 1930s by S. Charles Lee, demolished in 1974.
- Burbank – Legitimate theater then movies and burlesque – 548-550 S. Main St. Designed by Robert Brown Young for David Burbank, opened in 1893, sat 1,027, demolished in 1973 or 1974.
- College – Movie theater – 439 S. Hill St. Opened in 1910. Operated by Arthur S. Hyman, then Thomas L. Tally, then Louis L. Bard. Closed c. 1929.
- Bard's Hill Street/Town – Movie theater – 444 S. Hill St. Opened in 1920 by Louis L. Bard, closed 1985.
- RKO Hillstreet – Movie theater – 801 S. Hill St. Opened in 1922, closed in 1963, demolished in 1965.
- Paramount – Movie palace – NE corner of 6th and Hill St., with the Metropolitan Annex at 553 S. Broadway connecting the theater to Broadway. Theater designed by George Edwin Bergstrom (exterior) and William Lee Woollett (interior) for Sid Grauman, theater and annex opened in 1923, theater sat more than 3,600, bought by Paramount Publix in 1924, annex redesigned by Hal Pereira in 1941, theater closed in 1960 and demolished in 1962, annex converted to office/commercial.

== Shopping ==
=== Department stores ===
==== Flagships ====
- A. Hamburger & Sons/May Company, 1,100,000 sq ft (100,000 m^{2})
- Bullock's, 806,000 sq ft (74,900 m^{2})
- The Broadway, 460,000 sq ft (43,000 m^{2})
- Fifth Street Store/Walker's/Milliron's/Ohrbach's, 325,000 sq ft (30,200 m^{2})
- Eastern-Columbia, more than 275,650 sq ft (25,609 m^{2})
- Blackstone's/Famous
- Desmond's

==== Non-flagships ====
- Barker Bros., 150,000 sq ft (14,000 m^{2})
- Parmelee-Dohrmann, 70,000 sq ft (6,500 m^{2})
- Schulte United, 38,000 sq ft (3,500 m^{2})
- Woolworth's, 30,600 sq ft (2,840 m^{2})
- Grayson's

=== Apparel ===
- Silverwood's, 115,400 sq ft (10,720 m^{2})
- Hartfield's, 37,080 sq ft (3,445 m^{2})
- Swelldom
- Lerner's

== In popular culture ==
Los Angeles's Broadway Theater District has been used as a filming location for decades and many of its buildings can be seen in Hollywood films, including Safety Last! (1923), Blade Runner (1982), Barton Fink (1991), Last Action Hero (1993), Ed Wood (1994), 500 Days of Summer (2009), The Artist (2011), La La Land (2016), and more.

== See also ==
- List of Registered Historic Places in Los Angeles
