= Lerners Building =

Building in Los Angeles, California

- U.S. Historic district – Contributing property
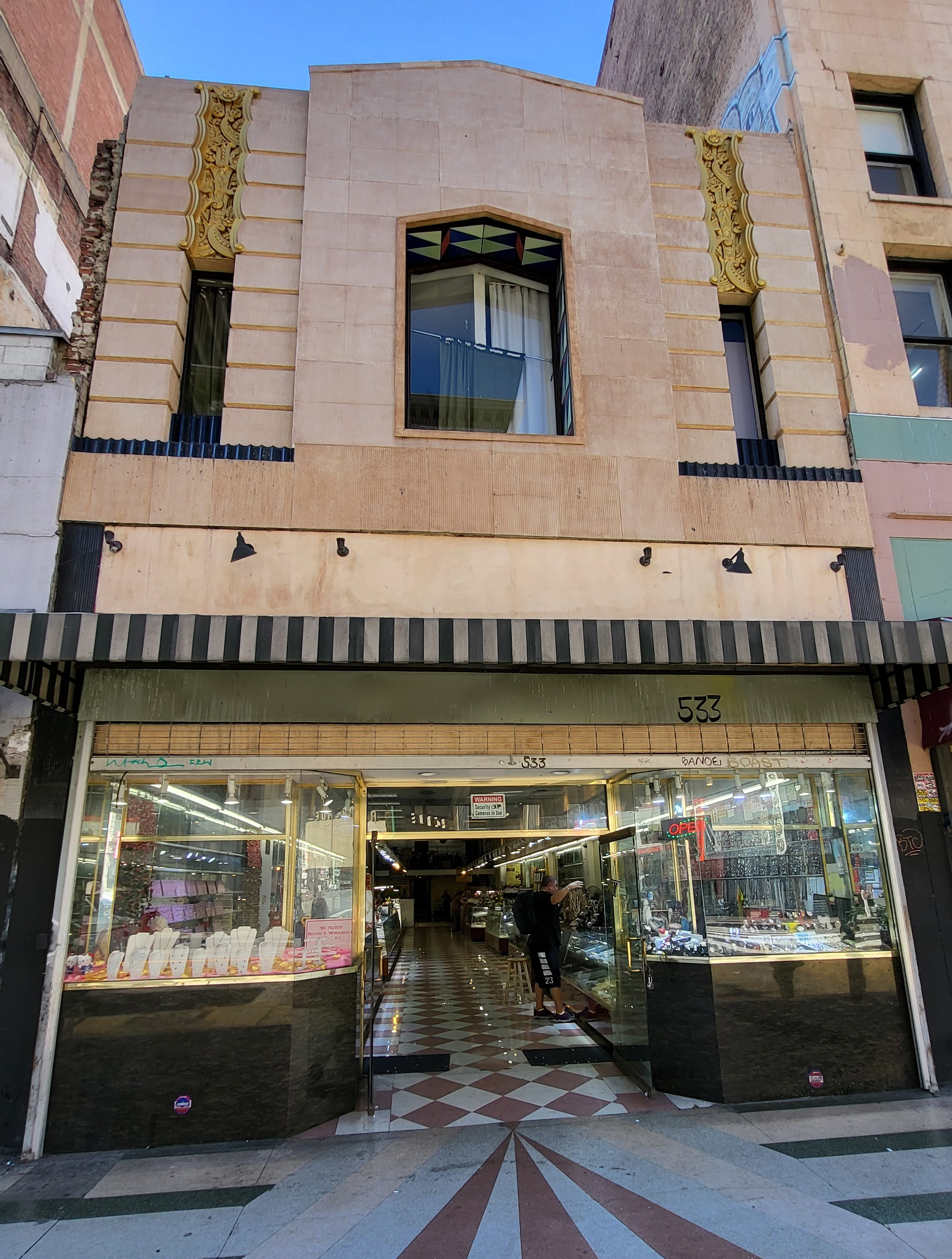
- The building in 2025

- Location within the Los Angeles metropolitan area
- Location: 533 S. Broadway, Los Angeles, California
- Coordinates: 34°02′52″N 118°15′06″W
- Built: 1931
- Architect: Philip Barker
- Architectural style: Art Deco
- Part of: Broadway Theater and Commercial District (ID79000484)
- Designated CP: May 9, 1979

Lerners Building, also known as Reed's, is a historic two-story building located at 533 S. Broadway in the Jewelry District and Broadway Theater District in the historic core of downtown Los Angeles.

== History ==
Lerners Building was designed by Philip Barker and built in 1931. It originally housed the women's apparel store Lerner’s.

In 1944, Grayson’s department store moved into the building and installed a Moderne façade that concealed the original surface and windows. The facade has since been removed.

In 1979, the Broadway Theater and Commercial District was added to the National Register of Historic Places, with this building listed as a contributing property in the district.

== Architecture and design ==
Lerners Building features an Art Deco design characterized by its cast stone cladding and bas-relief. The building is organized into three bays and has an expansive recessed balcony with colored tile details. Flanking the balcony are slim bronze-framed windows with stylized floral stone details. The building is made of reinforced concrete.

In 1979, when the building was included as a contributing property in the National Register of Historic Places, marble cladding covered the windows and exterior, but this has since been removed and the building restored to its original look.

== See also ==
- List of contributing properties in the Broadway Theater and Commercial District
