= Tower Theatre (Los Angeles) =

United States historic place & Apple Store location

- U.S. Historic district – Contributing property
- Los Angeles Historic-Cultural Monument
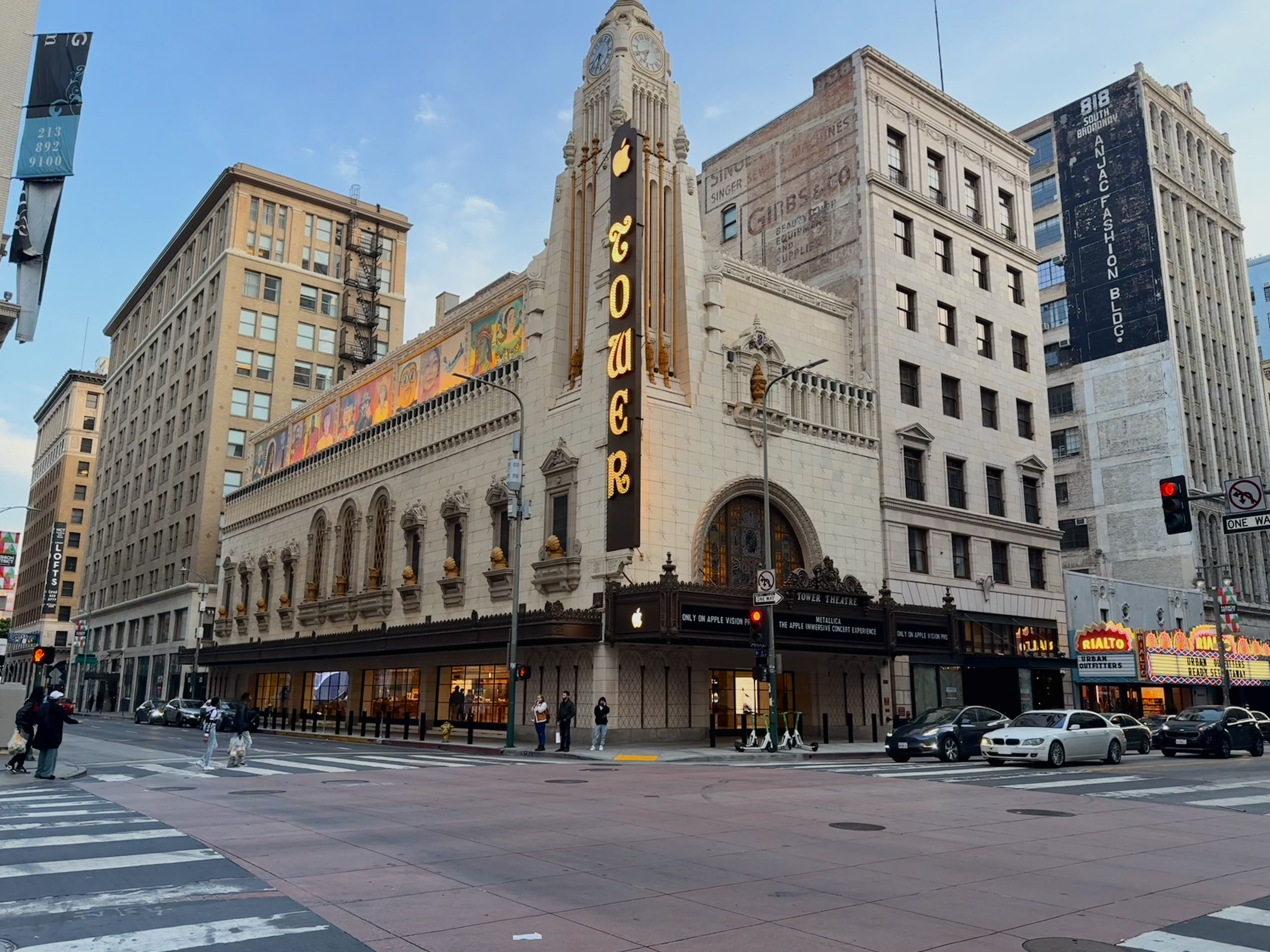
- The building in 2025

- Location within the Los Angeles metropolitan area
- Location: 800 S. Broadway, Los Angeles, California
- Coordinates: 34.043375°N 118.254444°W
- Built: 1927
- Architect: S. Charles Lee
- Architectural style: Baroque Revival
- Part of: Broadway Theater and Commercial District (ID79000484)
- LAHCM No.: 450

Significant dates
- Designated CP: May 9, 1979
- Designated LAHCM: August 16, 1989

Tower Theatre (known as Apple Tower Theatre since its refurbishment by Apple) is a historic movie theater that opened in 1927 in the Broadway Theater District of Downtown Los Angeles. It is currently an Apple Store, and serves as Los Angeles flagship for the company.

== History ==
Tower Theatre was commissioned by H.L. Gumbiner, the businessman who also commissioned Los Angeles Theatre in 1931, and was the first theater designed by S. Charles Lee. The theater replaced Garrick Theatre and sat 900 on a 50 by 152 feet (15 m × 46 m) site.

Tower Theatre opened in 1927 with the silent film The Gingham Girl. The theater was the first in Los Angeles wired for talking pictures and was the location of the sneak preview and Los Angeles premiere of Warner Bros.' revolutionary part-talking The Jazz Singer (1927). The theater was also the first in Los Angeles to be air conditioned.

The theater added a marquee after World War II and changed its name to Newsreel Theater for a short period in the early 1950s. It closed as a theatre in 1988 and was declared Los Angeles Historic-Cultural Monument No. 450 the following year.

=== Modern use ===
As with many other historic theaters in downtown Los Angeles, Tower Theatre was abandoned for many years. In recent times, its lobby was leased to various vendors and the auditorium was used by Living Faith Evangelical Church.

Apple expressed interest in leasing Tower Theatre as a retail location as early as 2015, and in 2018, the company submitted plans to renovate the building. Refurbishing was completed by 2021 and the theater reopened as Apple's Los Angeles flagship Apple Store on June 24, 2021.

== Architecture and design ==
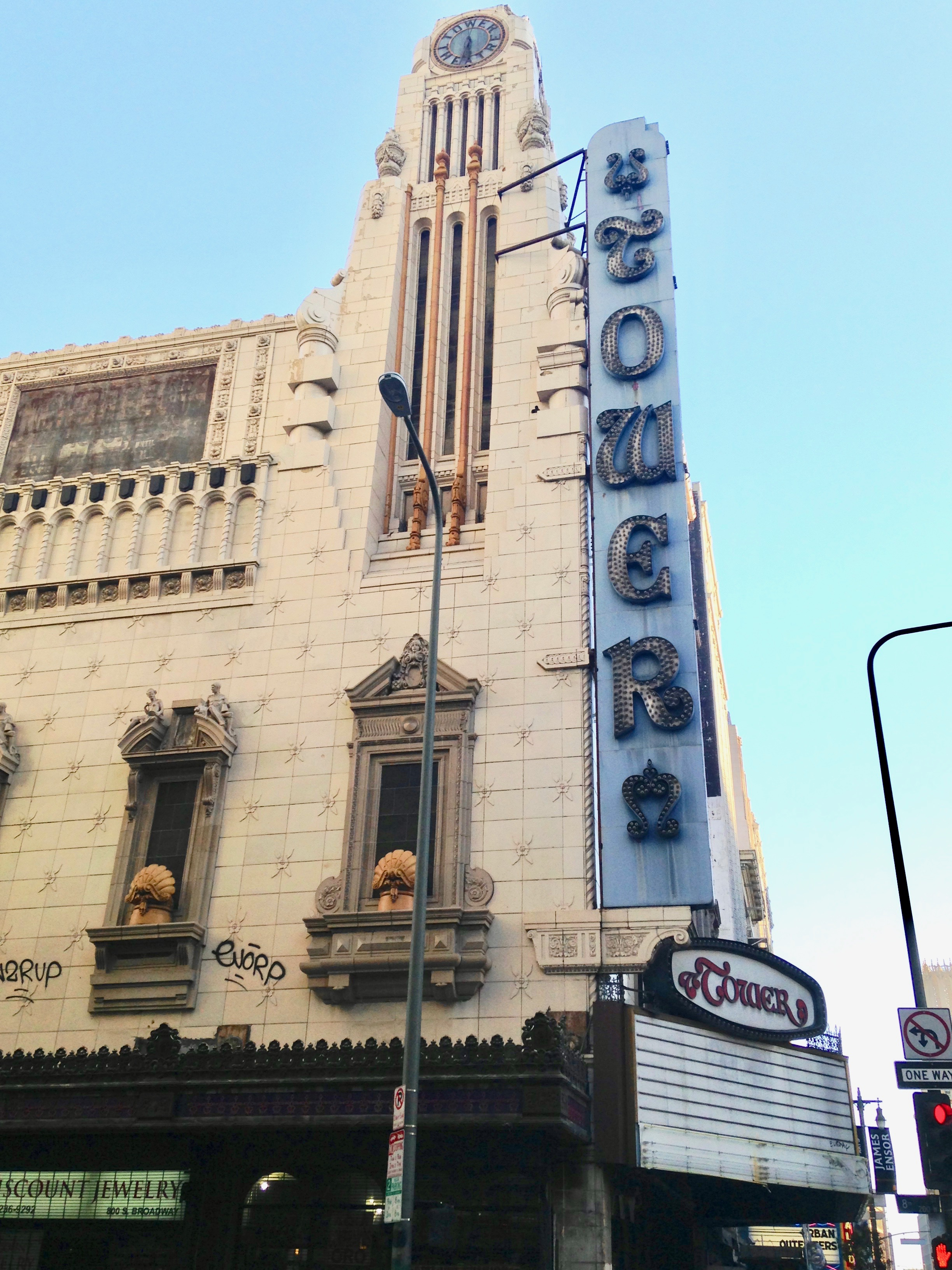
The theatre in 2014

Tower Theater was designed in Baroque Revival style with French, Spanish, Moorish, and Italian elements executed in terra-cotta. The theater's interior was modeled after Paris Opera House, while its exterior features a prominent Goodhuesque corner-tower.

== Filming location ==
Tower Theatre can be seen in:

- The Omega Man (1971)
- The Mambo Kings (1992)
- Last Action Hero (1993)
- Fight Club (1999)
- Coyote Ugly (2000)
- Mulholland Drive (2001)
- The Prestige (2006)
- Transformers (2007)
- Twin Peaks (3rd season, 2017)
- Nike, Inc. Dream Crazy (2018 ad)

== See also ==
- List of Los Angeles Historic-Cultural Monuments in Downtown Los Angeles
- List of contributing properties in the Broadway Theater and Commercial District
