= Los Angeles Theatre =

Movie theater in Los Angeles, California

- U.S. Historic district – Contributing property
- Los Angeles Historic-Cultural Monument
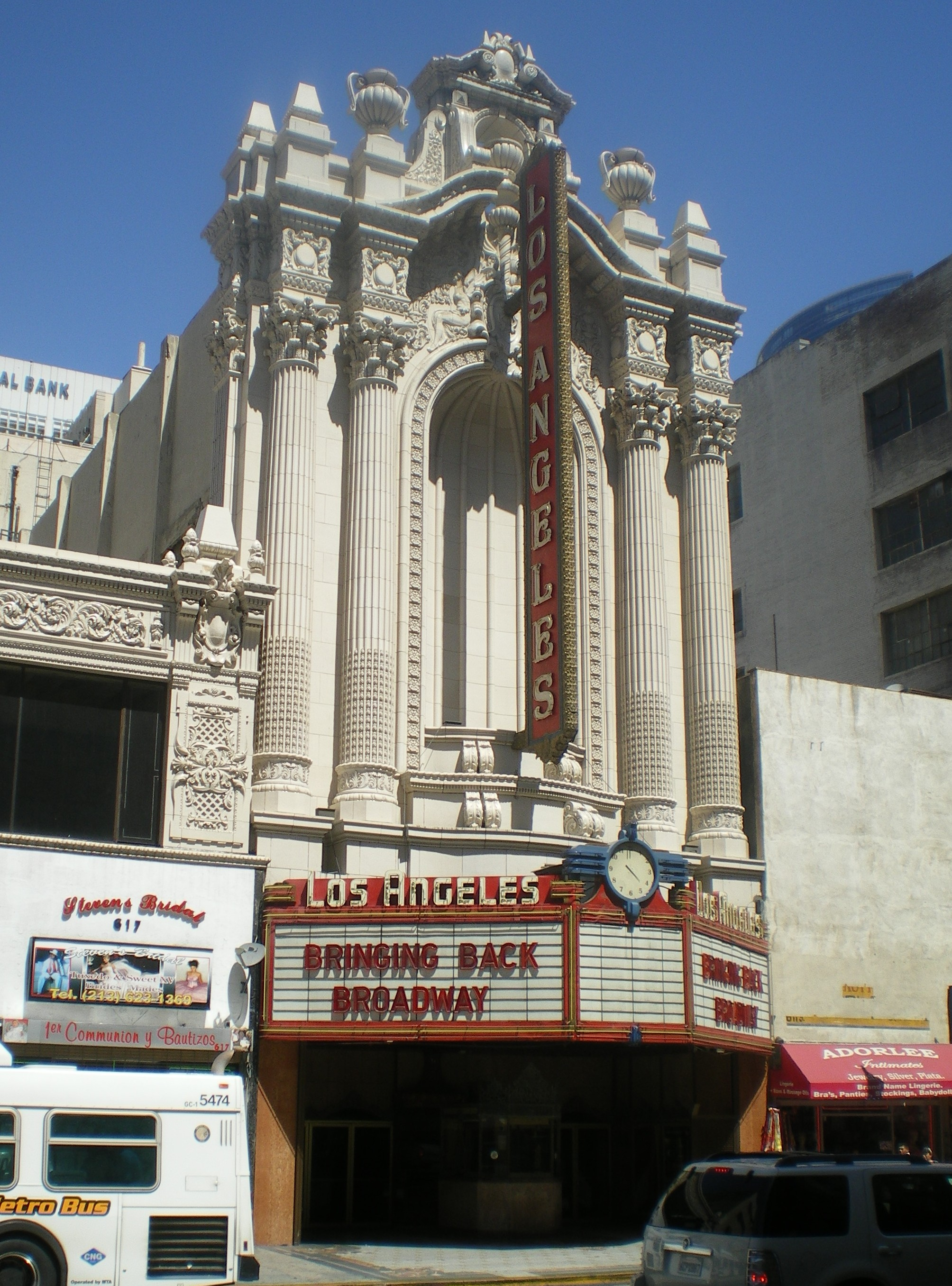

- Location within the Los Angeles metropolitan area Location within California Location within the United States
- Location: 615 S. Broadway; Los Angeles, California
- Coordinates: 34°2′47″N 118°15′9″W
- Architect: S. Charles Lee; S. Tilden Norton
- Architectural style: French Baroque
- Part of: Broadway Theater and Commercial District (ID79000484)
- LAHCM No.: 225

Significant dates
- Added to NRHP: May 9, 1979
- Designated LAHCM: August 15, 1979

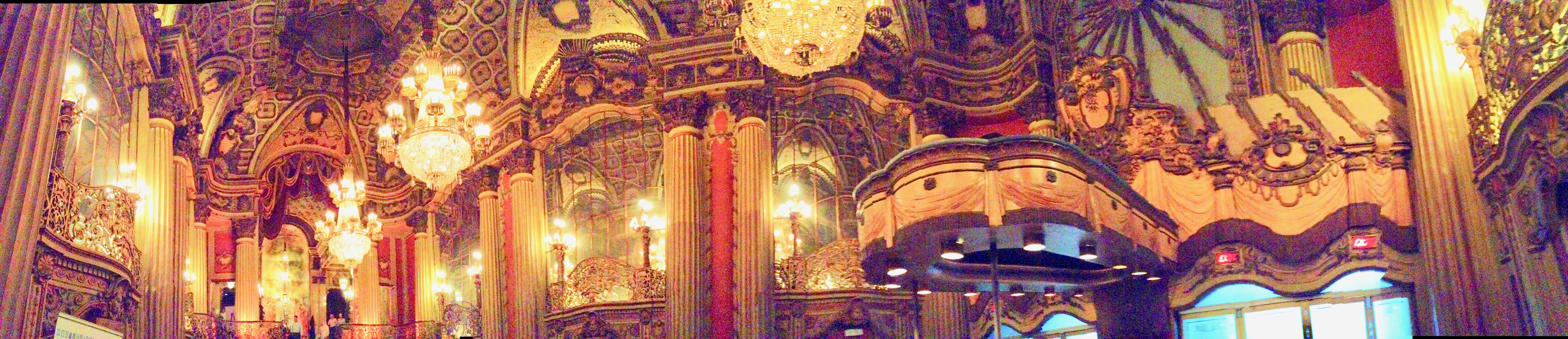
Panorama of the theater's lobby

Los Angeles Theatre is a 2,000-seat historic former movie palace located at 615 S. Broadway in the Jewelry District and Broadway Theater District in the historic core of Downtown Los Angeles.

== History ==
Los Angeles Theatre was constructed in late 1930 and early 1931. It was commissioned by H.L. Gumbiner, an independent film exhibitor from Chicago, who also built the nearby Tower Theatre. Designed by S. Charles Lee, and Samuel Tilden Norton, the theater features a French Baroque interior. With its grand central staircase and gold brocade drapes, it has for many years been considered to be among the city's most lavish landmarks. The opulent interior is said to have been modeled after the Hall of Mirrors in Versailles. A crystal fountain stands at the top of the grand staircase, a restaurant and a ballroom were on the lower level.

The theater was built in less than six months. In August 1930 there was only an excavated hole in the ground, and in January 1931 the theater had its grand opening. Lee speeded construction by having the plaster ornamentation fabricated off-site and then brought to the building and fit together like a jigsaw puzzle. Most other theaters of the day had their decorative plaster molded and finished in place, with artisans working on scaffolding.

Charlie Chaplin helped fund the completion so that it would be ready to open with the premiere of his film City Lights in January 1931. It was the last such movie palace built on Broadway, as the area began to feel the effects of the Depression and faced competition from Hollywood Blvd. as the "Great White Way of the West". Attendance was strong through World War II, when many factory workers would see shows before and after their shifts. With the postwar suburbanization of Los Angeles, attendance declined throughout the later decades of the 20th century.

After closing its doors to the public in 1994, the Los Angeles has sat vacant for many years, although it can be rented as a venue for special events. For example, in 2004, the theater housed the multi layered theater production "Alma" (about Alma Mahler-Werfel) by Joshua Sobol, directed by Paulus Manker.

The theater is listed on the National Register of Historic Places.

== In popular culture ==
Los Angeles Theatre is used most often today as a location for filming, and is frequently seen in commercials, television shows, and feature films. It has been featured in Funny Lady (1975); New York, New York (1977); Gattaca (1997); Man on the Moon (1999); Charlie's Angels (2000) and its sequel, Charlie's Angels: Full Throttle (2003); The Lords of Salem (2012); the AMC series Mad Men; among many other films. The theatre was used in the back drop on the set of The Tonight Show with Jay Leno, and seen in the music video for "Spiderwebs" by No Doubt, "Heartbreaker" by Mariah Carey (1999), "Jaded" by Aerosmith (2000), "Shake It" by Metro Station (2008), "Moves Like Jagger" by Maroon 5 and Christina Aguilera (2011), "Safe and Sound" by Capital Cities" (2013), "Delicate" by Taylor Swift (2018), "Black Swan" by BTS (2020), "2U" by Kang Daniel (2020), "Ghost Story" by Carrie Underwood (2022), "Middle of the Night" by Elley Duhé (2022), and "The Fate of Ophelia" by Taylor Swift (2025).

The theater's façade and marquee design was used as the inspiration for that of the Hyperion Theater at Disney California Adventure in Anaheim.

== Gallery ==
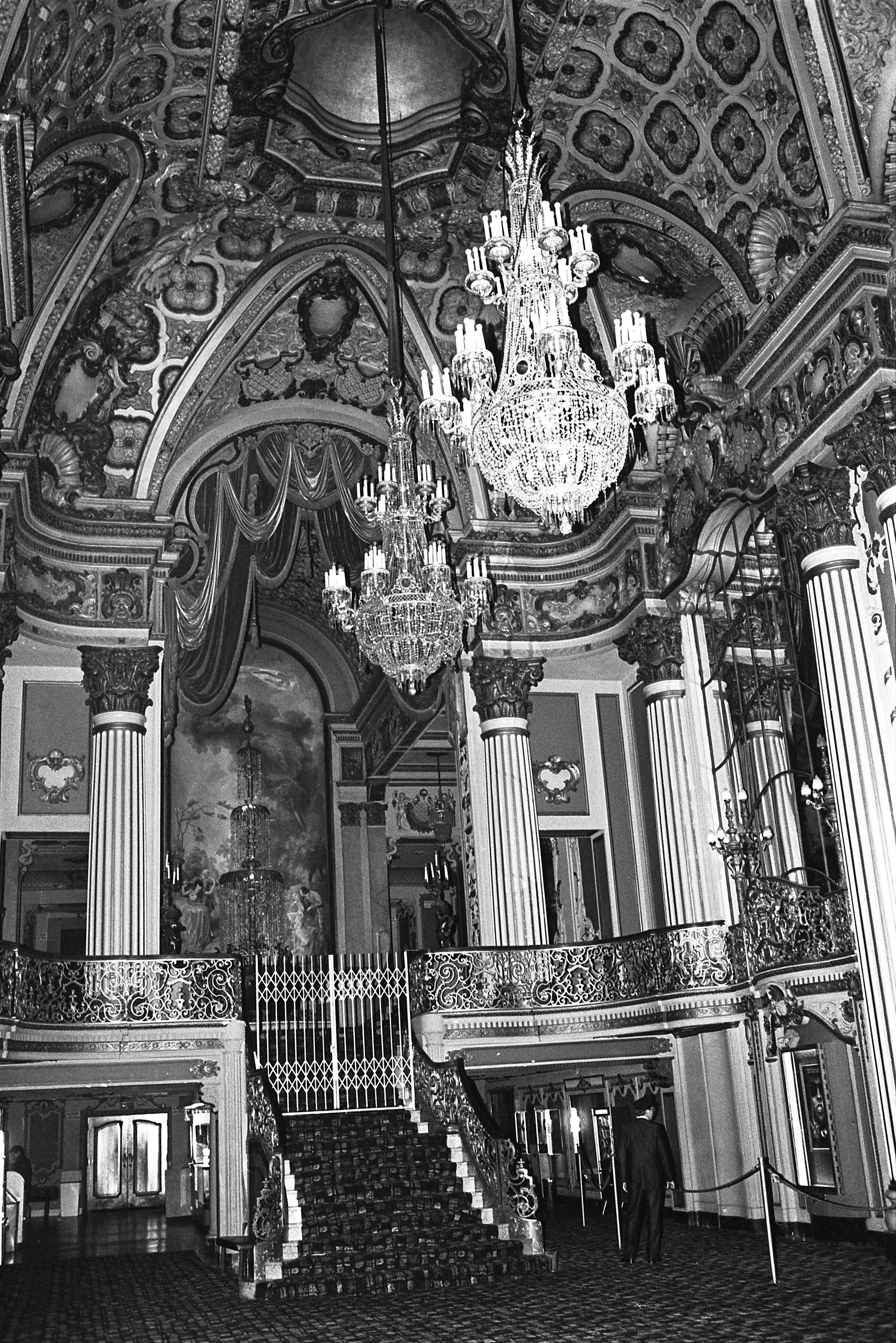
Lobby, 1987

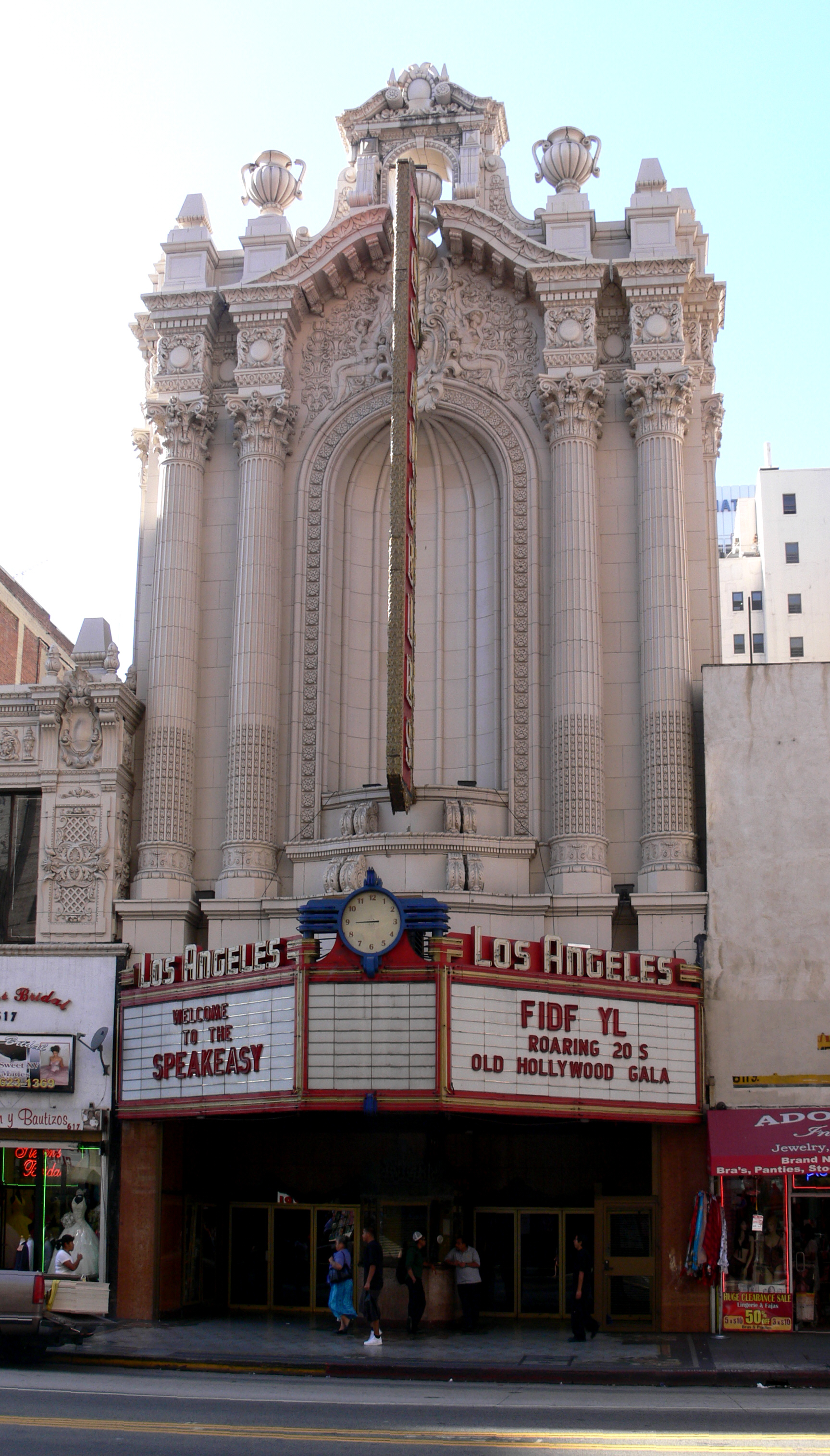

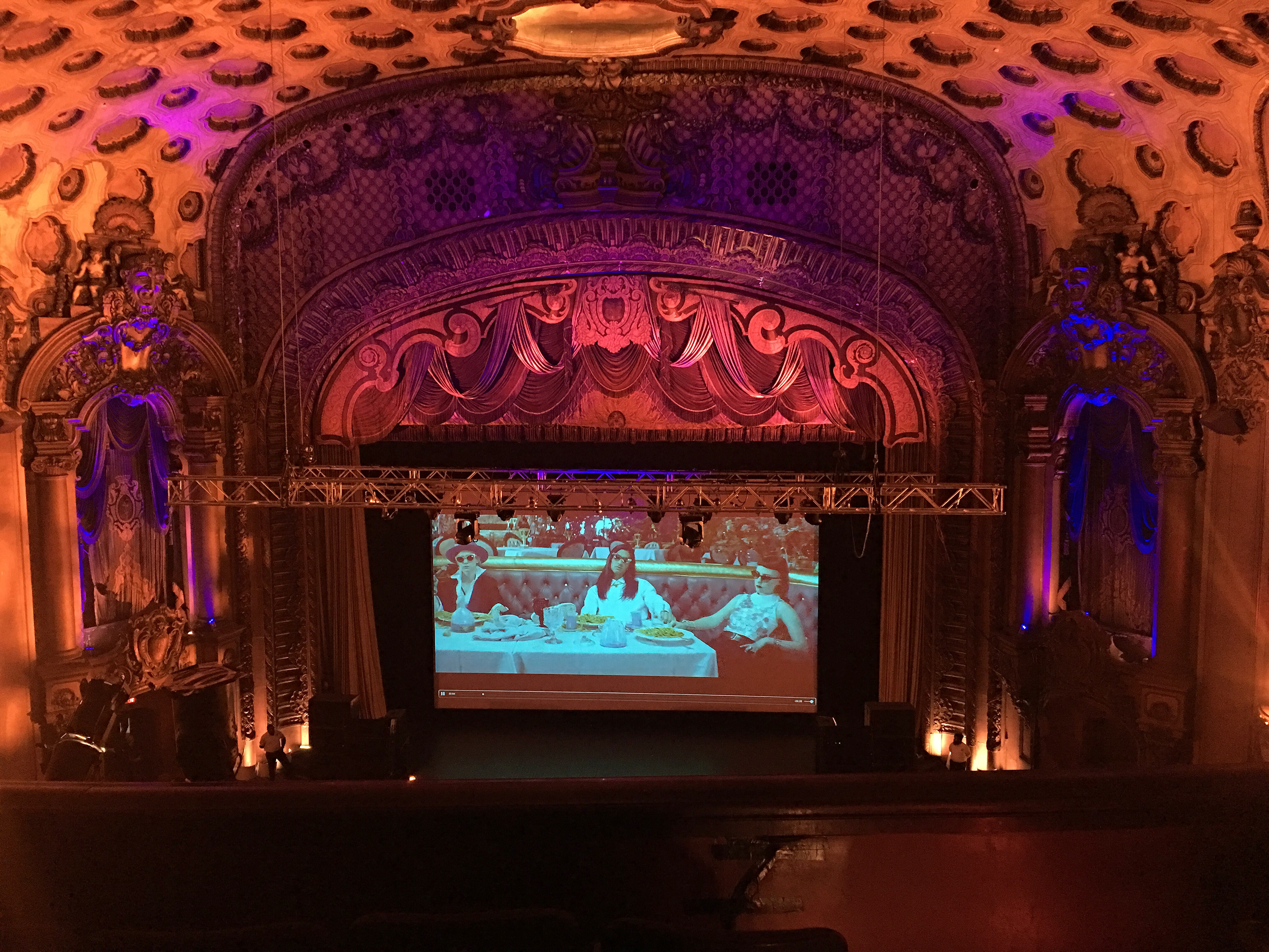

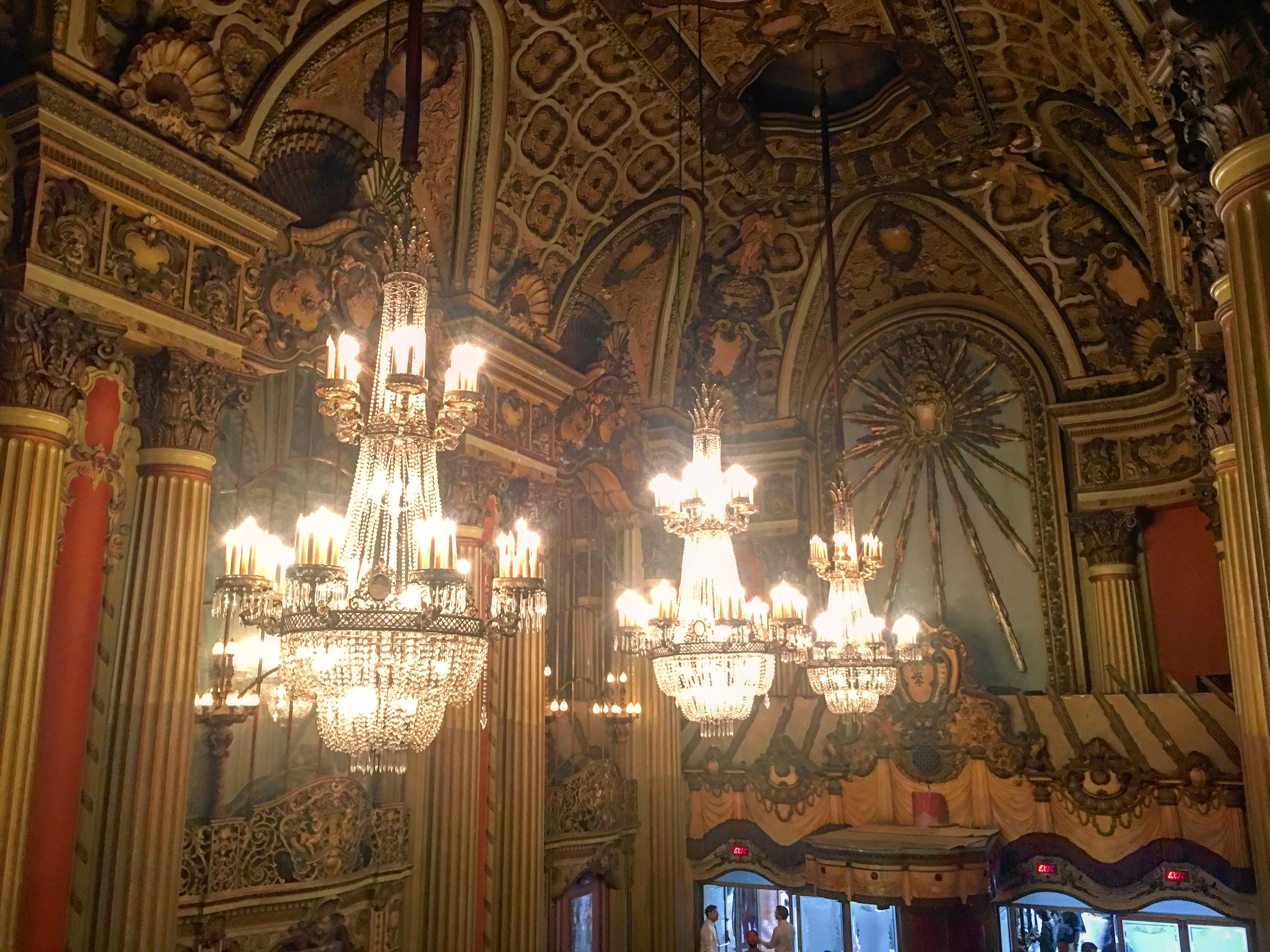

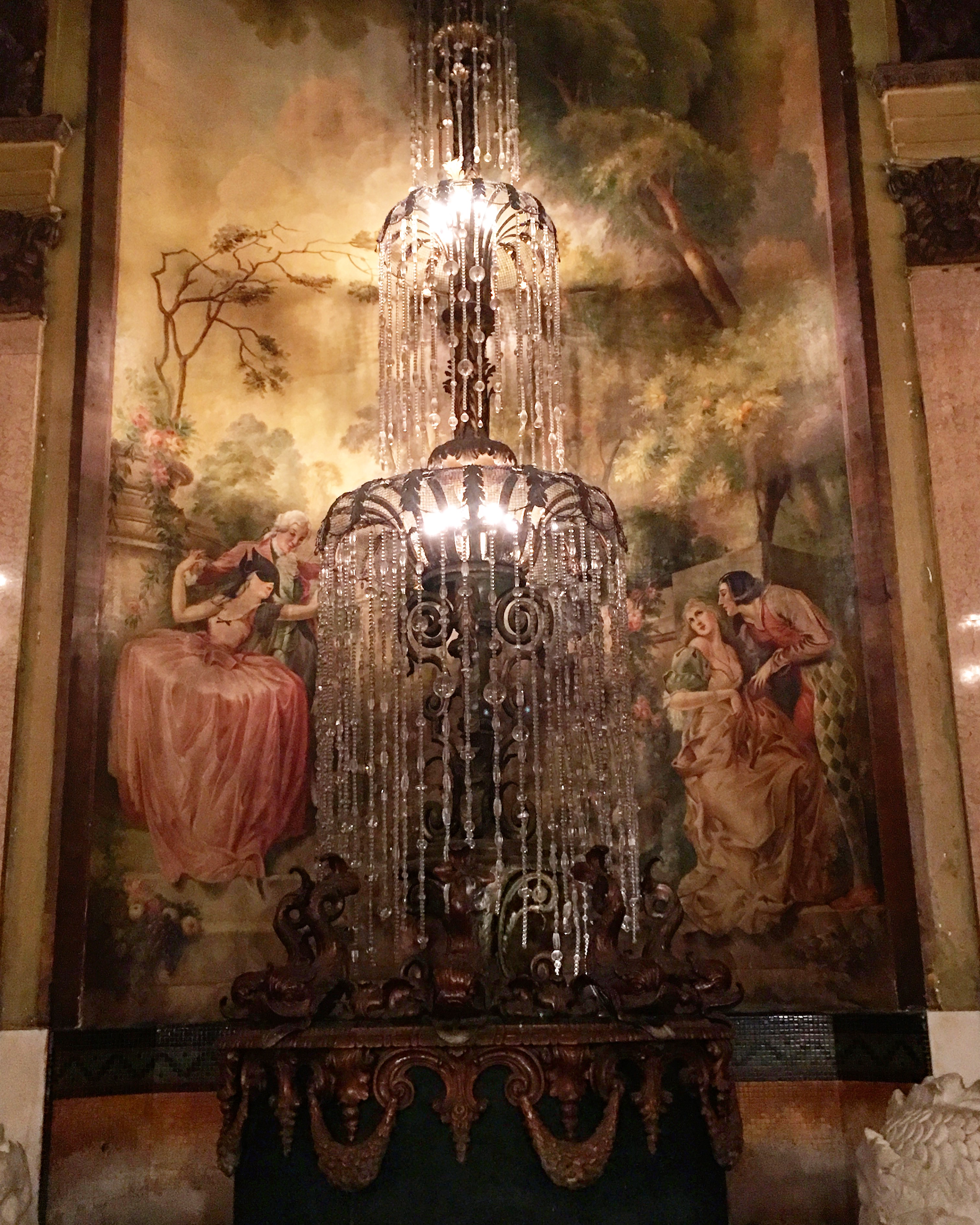

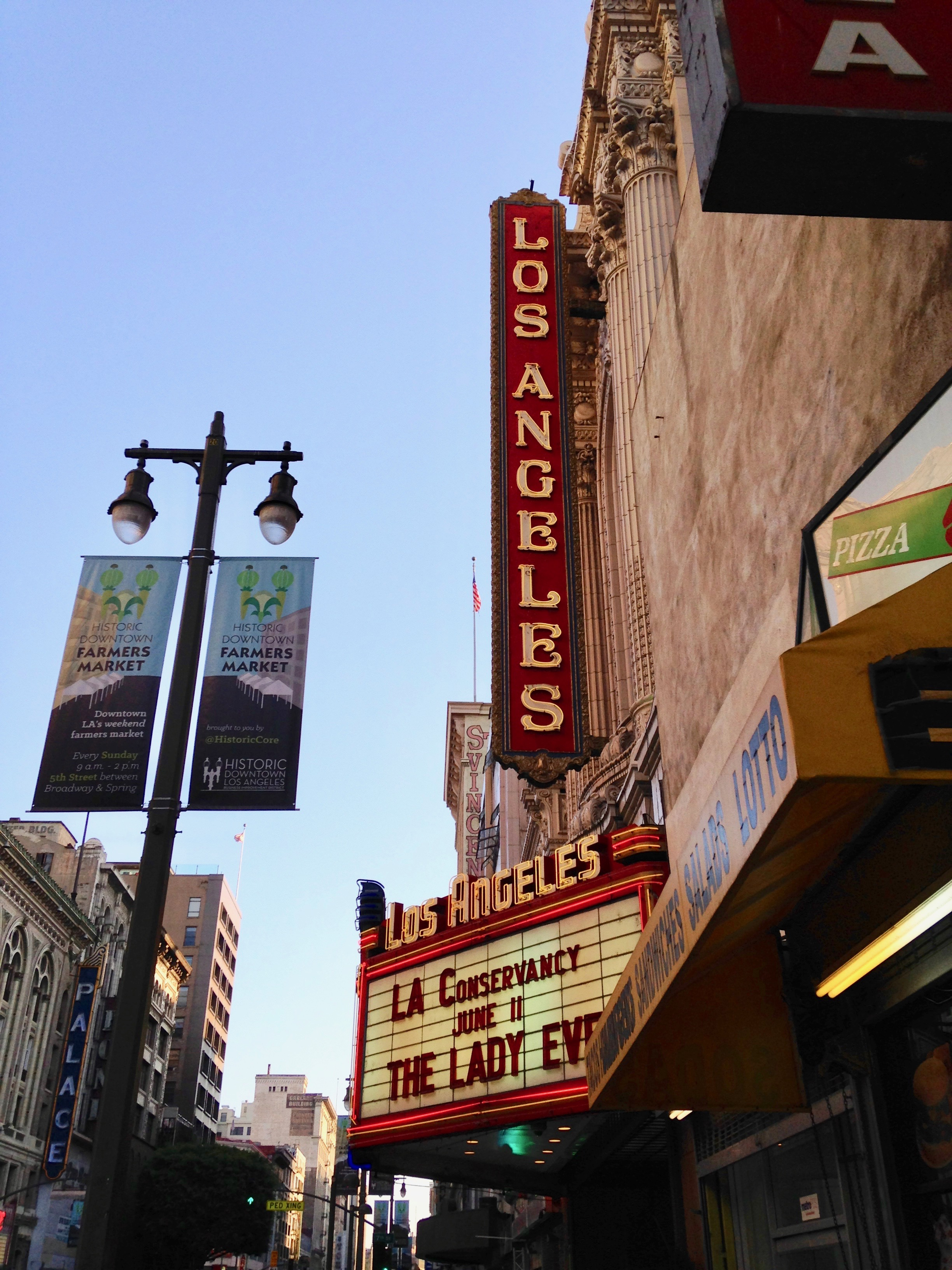

== See also ==
- List of Los Angeles Historic-Cultural Monuments in Downtown Los Angeles
- List of contributing properties in the Broadway Theater and Commercial District
