= White Stag =

A white stag is a white stag or white deer.

White Stag may also refer to:

- White Stag (Narnia), object of the final quest of the Kings and Queens of Narnia in the C.S. Lewis book The Lion, the Witch, and the Wardrobe
- The White Stag, a children's short novel, recipient of the 1938 Newbery Medal
- White Stag or Csodaszarvas of Hungarian mythology, a central figure in the origins of the Hungarian people
- The White Stag group, mid-20th-century artist group in Ireland
- White Stag (clothing), a brand of clothing sold by Wal-Mart and a former sportswear manufacturer in Portland, Oregon
- White Stag sign, an historic sign in Portland, Oregon, United States
- White Hart, the personal badge of Richard II
