= Bill Naito =

American businessman, civic leader, and philanthropist

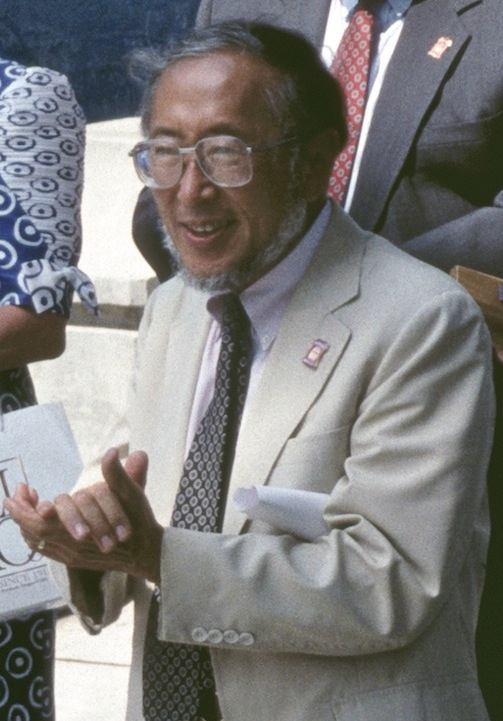
- Naito in 1991
- Born: William Sumio Naito; September 16, 1925; Portland, Oregon
- Died: May 8, 1996 (aged 70); Portland, Oregon
- Monuments: Naito Parkway (street) in Portland, Oregon
- Education: Master's degree, Economics
- Alma mater: Reed College, University of Chicago
- Occupation(s): Businessman, real estate developer, entrepreneur; President and co-owner of Norcrest China Company (which also owned Made in Oregon, Naito Properties, Skidmore Development Co. and others)
- Spouse: Millicent (Micki) Naito (1951–1996)
- Children: 4

William Sumio Naito (September 16, 1925 – May 8, 1996) was an American businessman, civic leader and philanthropist in Portland, Oregon, U.S. He was an enthusiastic advocate for investment in downtown Portland, both private and public, and is widely credited for helping to reverse a decline in the area in the 1970s through acquiring and renovating derelict or aging buildings and encouraging others to invest in downtown and the central city.

In the 1980s and 1990s he was one of Portland's most esteemed business and civic leaders, honored with "dozens" of awards and holding positions on several volunteer boards, commissions, and advisory committees. He commonly went by the name Bill, as opposed to William. An arterial street in downtown Portland, Front Avenue, was renamed Naito Parkway in his honor.

== Early life ==
William S. Naito was born in Portland in 1925, to Hide and Fukiye Naito, who had emigrated from Japan in 1912. His parents owned a curio shop in downtown Portland, and young Bill spent much time helping his father at the shop.

After the Japanese attack on Pearl Harbor in 1941, the Portland area became one of the "exclusion zones" created under Executive Order 9066, affecting Japanese Americans living within 200 miles (320 km) of the Pacific Coast. In order to avoid internment, Hide Naito moved the family to Salt Lake City, Utah, to live with relatives there. Bill Naito was a 16-year-old sophomore at Portland's former Washington High School at the time.

In Salt Lake City, Naito raised chickens in the back yard to support the family, designing and building the coops himself. After graduating from Granite High School, Naito joined the U.S. Army in 1944, and was a member of the 442nd Infantry Regiment during World War II. He served in Military Intelligence in the post-war occupation of Japan, as a translator, before being honorably discharged in 1946 at the rank of staff sergeant. He returned to Portland to attend Reed College, graduating Phi Beta Kappa in 1949 with a degree in economics. Continuing his education at the University of Chicago, he earned a master's degree in economics in 1951. He met Millicent (Micki) Sonley in Chicago, and they married in 1951. The couple had four children.

== Career ==
Bill returned again to Portland in 1952 to join his brother Sam Naito in running their family-owned import business, which in 1958 was incorporated as Norcrest China Company. In 1962, they purchased a decaying former hotel (the historic Globe Hotel) in what was then known as downtown Portland's "Skid Road" district, now Old Town, and converted it into a retail store named Import Plaza. The risky move proved a success, as the store thrived, and inspired the Naito brothers to acquire several other vacant or neglected historic buildings in downtown over the next several years and renovate them at a time when most other developers were shifting their focus to the suburbs and abandoning downtown. Bill Naito is credited with coining the name "Old Town" for Portland's Skid Road district, in order to improve the area's image, and one way he publicized the name was by having it painted in large letters on the side of a water tower atop the building Norcrest China occupied, the White Stag building. The name Old Town is now in widespread use for the district at the northeast end of downtown.

Headed by Bill and Sam Naito, Norcrest China Company became even more a property development company than a retailing enterprise, but remained both, with Bill focused on the former and Sam on the latter. Ultimately, the Naito brothers acquired and renovated more than 20 historic buildings in Portland. Among them was the Merchants' Hotel, built in the 1880s, which the Naitos' Skidmore Development Company restored and converted into mixed office and retail use in 1968. In a 1979 article, The Oregonian newspaper wrote that the "former Merchants Hotel in Old Town went from virtually abandoned building to cornerstone of Old Town business district, thanks to vision of Bill and Sam Naito."

One of their highest-profile such investments came in 1975, when they purchased the Olds, Wortman & King building, a six-story former Rhodes department store, occupying a full downtown block, which had closed the year before. They restored the 1910 building and converted it into an indoor shopping arcade for dozens of small stores and restaurants—downtown Portland's first shopping mall—which they named the "Galleria" and opened in 1976. An article in The Oregonian three months after the Galleria's opening referred to this project as being possibly "the most exciting development in downtown [Portland] merchandising in several decades."

At the same time, Bill Naito worked to convince others of his vision that downtown Portland could become a thriving, attractive place, if given attention and investment. In addition to private property development, he believed that investment in public amenities was also a key part of that equation. He was a strong proponent of building a light rail system in Portland when proposed in the 1970s—the MAX system which opened in 1986 and has expanded since—as well as other public transit investments in downtown, including the Portland Transit Mall, Fareless Square, Portland Vintage Trolley, and the Portland Streetcar. He led a successful effort to plant more than 10,000 trees in the city, as founder of the Street Tree Advisory Committee, which became Portland's Urban Forestry Commission and which he chaired from 1976 until his death. He donated space to start Portland's Saturday Market, a popular arts and crafts market that has been held in the Old Town/Chinatown district continuously since 1974. He was co-founder and chairman of Artquake, an annual arts festival held in downtown from the 1980s until 1995. He fought for adequate funding to keep Multnomah County's public libraries in operation.

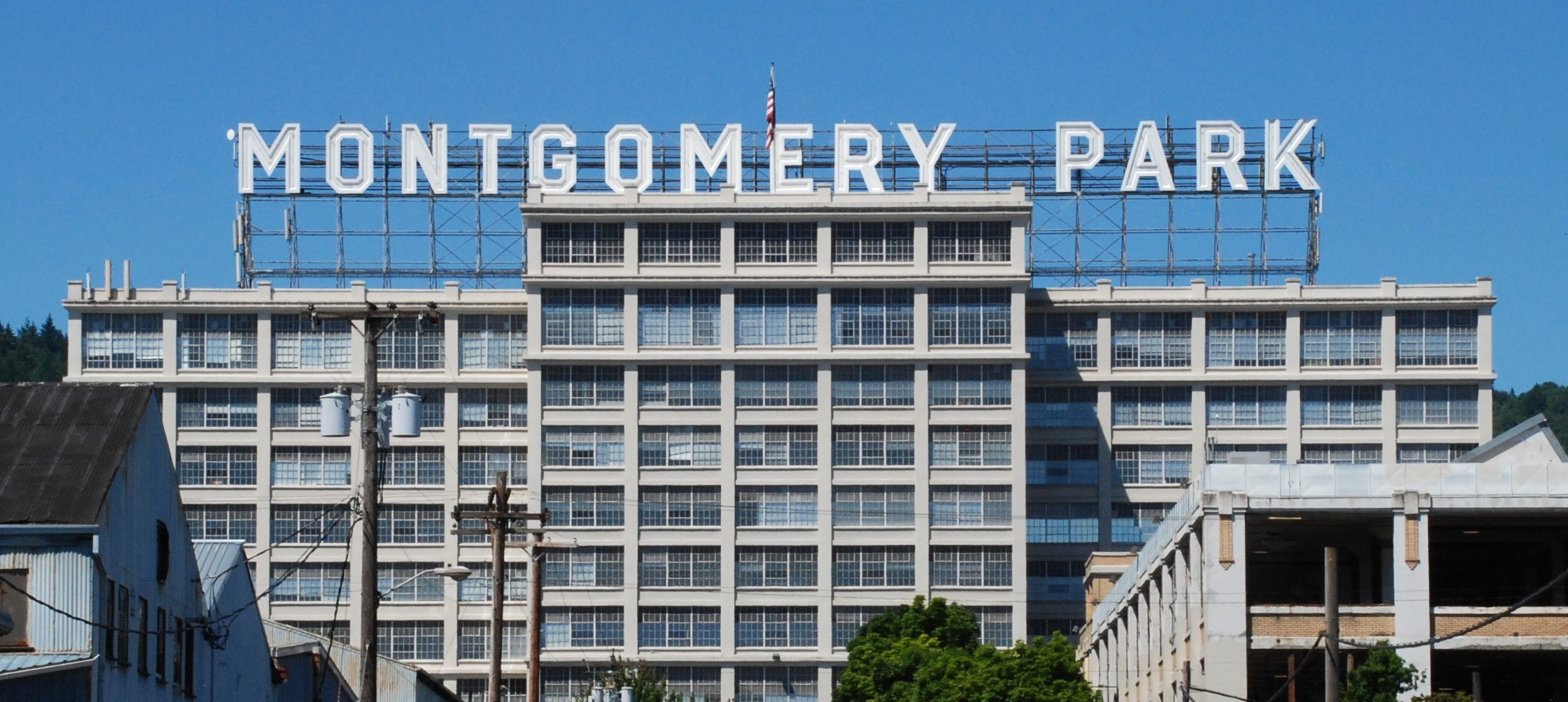
Montgomery Park in 2011

Although focused on downtown Portland, Naito's development efforts were not limited to it. Norcrest launched its Made in Oregon brand with the opening of a store at the Portland International Airport in 1975. By the 1990s it had grown to a chain of 11 stores. And, in 1985–1986 Naito Properties acquired and renovated a nine-story former Montgomery Ward catalog warehouse in Northwest Portland, refitting it for offices and trade shows/banquets and renaming it Montgomery Park.

While Bill Naito's business ventures were often financially risky, it was clear that the potential for profit was not his primary motive, or at least not his only motive. He was widely recognized for taking on ventures that were at least as beneficial to the community as they were potentially moneymaking. When asked about his own salary by The Oregonian in 1985, he replied, "I'm a little crazy. My pay may not be the best in town, but I offer good economic advice. My objective is not to make a pile of money. That's one objective, but another is satisfaction." In the early 1980s he built the 300-unit McCormick Pier Apartments along the Willamette River waterfront, just north of Old Town, replacing a derelict warehouse district and providing needed middle-income housing in an area where other developers had concluded it could not succeed. He lobbied in favor of a proposal for historic Union Station to be acquired by the city (and thereby preserved), which came to fruition in 1987.

Bill and Sam Naito were jointly honored with the "First Citizen" award for 1982 by the Portland Association of Realtors.

== Support for streetcars ==
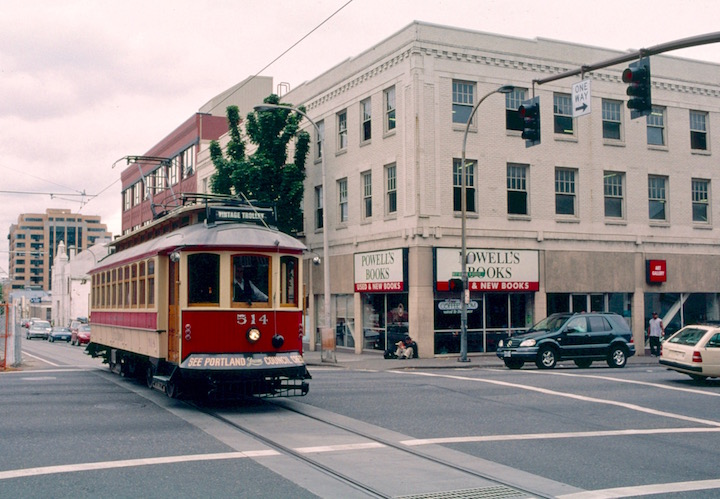
A Vintage Trolley passing Powell's Books, on the Portland Streetcar line, in 2001

As early as 1975, Bill Naito concluded that operation of historic streetcars had a significant potential to attract people to downtown Portland, and he headed a drive in 1977 to convince downtown property owners to commit to helping fund the construction of such a line; Portland's last streetcars had been abandoned in the 1950s. Although that idea was soon supplanted by plans for a 15-mile (24 km) light rail system, which he also supported, Naito kept alive the idea of running vintage trolley cars on the downtown section of the future MAX light rail. He helped convince city officials to embrace what became Portland Vintage Trolley, which started service in 1991. Bill and Sam Naito went as far as to purchase six old American-style trolley cars being retired in Portugal in the early 1980s with the intention of donating them for restoration for this planned service, and one of those cars was on display next to the Galleria for ten months starting in June 1985 to publicize the plans. However, TriMet decided that buying new faux-vintage trolleys would be more cost-effective than rebuilding the Portuguese cars and allow larger per-car capacity, so the Naito-owned streetcars were not used and eventually were sold to other places, such as Memphis' Main Street Trolley. At the time of its start, Portland Vintage Trolley was one of only a few urban heritage streetcar services in the country, whereas similar operations now exist in more than 15 U.S. cities. Bill Naito was president of the non-profit Portland Vintage Trolley, Inc. from its formation in 1987 until his death in 1996.

Although the modern Portland Streetcar did not come to fruition until five years after Bill Naito's death, it had been working its way through various stages of planning since the 1980s, under the name Central City Trolley or (later) Central City Streetcar, and Bill Naito was one of the proposal's most influential and ardent supporters, serving on the board of the non-profit Portland Streetcar, Inc. (PSI). At the 1999 groundbreaking for the line, PSI board president Donald Magnusen commented that the streetcar project was a vision of the late Bill Naito. The line opened in 2001 and has been extended several times since then.

== White Stag sign ==
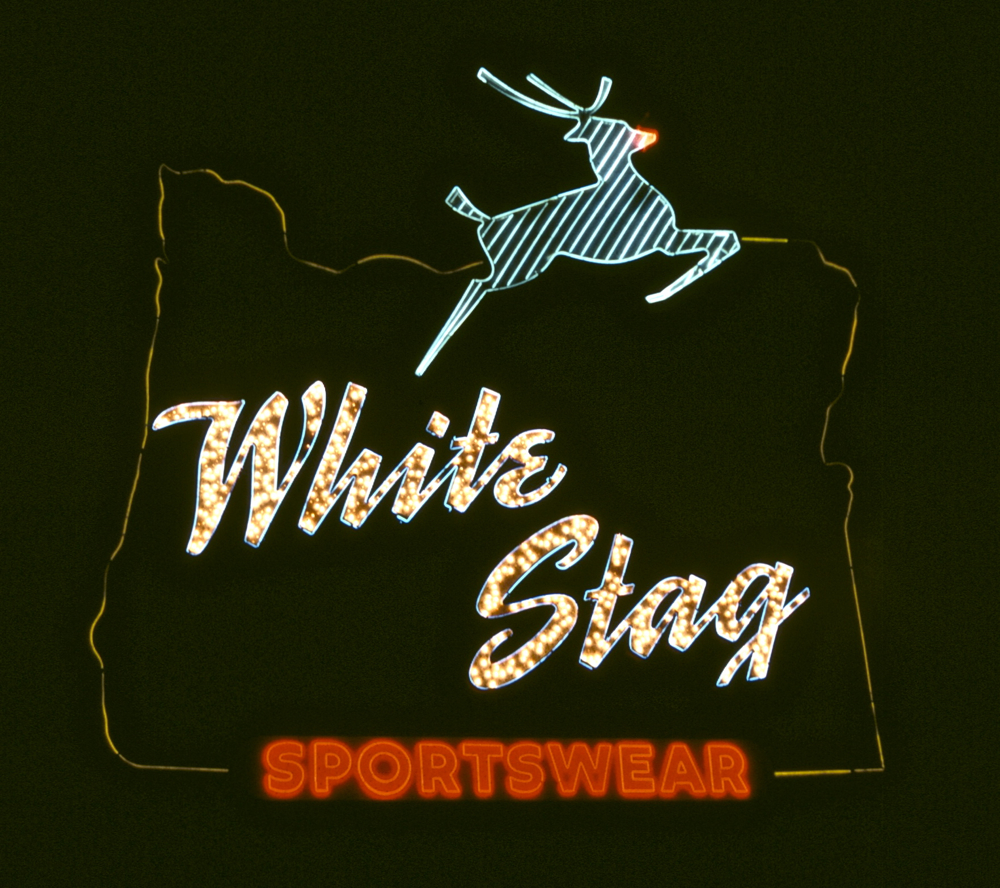
The White Stag sign in 1984

For many years until 2004, the main offices of Norcrest China were located in the 1907-built White Stag Building, at the intersection of West Burnside Street and what was then Front Avenue, in Portland's Old Town. The building was acquired by Norcrest division H. Naito Properties in 1972. Perched atop the building since 1940 is a large neon-and-incandescent-bulb sign known as the White Stag sign, which the city designated a historic landmark in 1977. Until 2010 it was owned by Ramsay Signs. The leaping stag on the sign is given an illuminated red "nose" each holiday season, a tradition started in 1959, but in 1989 the sign went dark after the building's previous occupants—who had continued paying the sign's electricity bill after moving out in 1973—decided to stop paying for the sign's maintenance. By this time, the sign, which also includes a neon outline in the shape of the state of Oregon, had become a popular local landmark.

As the 1989 holiday season approached, Bill Naito agreed to take over payment of the sign's upkeep, even though the sign continued to advertise White Stag Sportswear, which had no connection with any Norcrest or Naito property. "I miss the sign – I really do," he told The Oregonian, when asked about his decision. "So even after Christmas, I'm going to keep it on." Eight years later, in 1997, the sign's wording was changed from White Stag to the name of a Naito-owned brand, the Made in Oregon retail store chain. Norcrest China moved out of the building in 2004, but the sign retained the "Made in Oregon" wording until November 2010, when it was changed to "Portland Oregon", after Ramsay Signs donated it to the city.

Notwithstanding his willingness to pay to keep the historic sign functioning, and other community-minded "gifts" to fellow citizens, in his personal activities Naito was "notoriously frugal". He was described as a "gregarious workaholic" who was content to work at an old "battered desk" in an open office space shared with his employees. Despite his financial success, "Bill Naito continued to drive old cars and displayed few of the trappings of wealth," The Oregonian wrote in its 1996 obituary. Willamette Week called him "perhaps the most unpretentious tycoon Portland ever embraced."

== Other involvement ==
Naito served on the boards of several organizations and entities, including the following:

- Reed College, board of trustees (1975–1996)
- Portland Urban Forestry Commission (1976–1996)
- Portland Chamber of Commerce (1977–1996)
- National Trust for Historic Preservation (1982–1987)
- Multnomah County Library (chair) (1990–1996)
- National Wildlife Foundation (1989–1996).

He was also finance chair for the Oregon Nikkei Endowment, an organization devoted to preserving and sharing the history of Japanese Americans in Oregon. His fundraising through the non-profit made possible the creation of a memorial in Portland, the Japanese-American Historical Plaza, which opened in 1990 in Tom McCall Waterfront Park. Its stone sculptures bear the names of Japanese internment camps and stories of some of the internees, along with the U.S. Bill of Rights.

At the time of his death, he was also working with others to create a Chinese garden in Portland's Old Town/Chinatown district, an effort which ultimately led to the opening in 2000 of the Portland Classical Chinese Garden (renamed the Lan Su Chinese Garden in 2010).

== Memorials ==
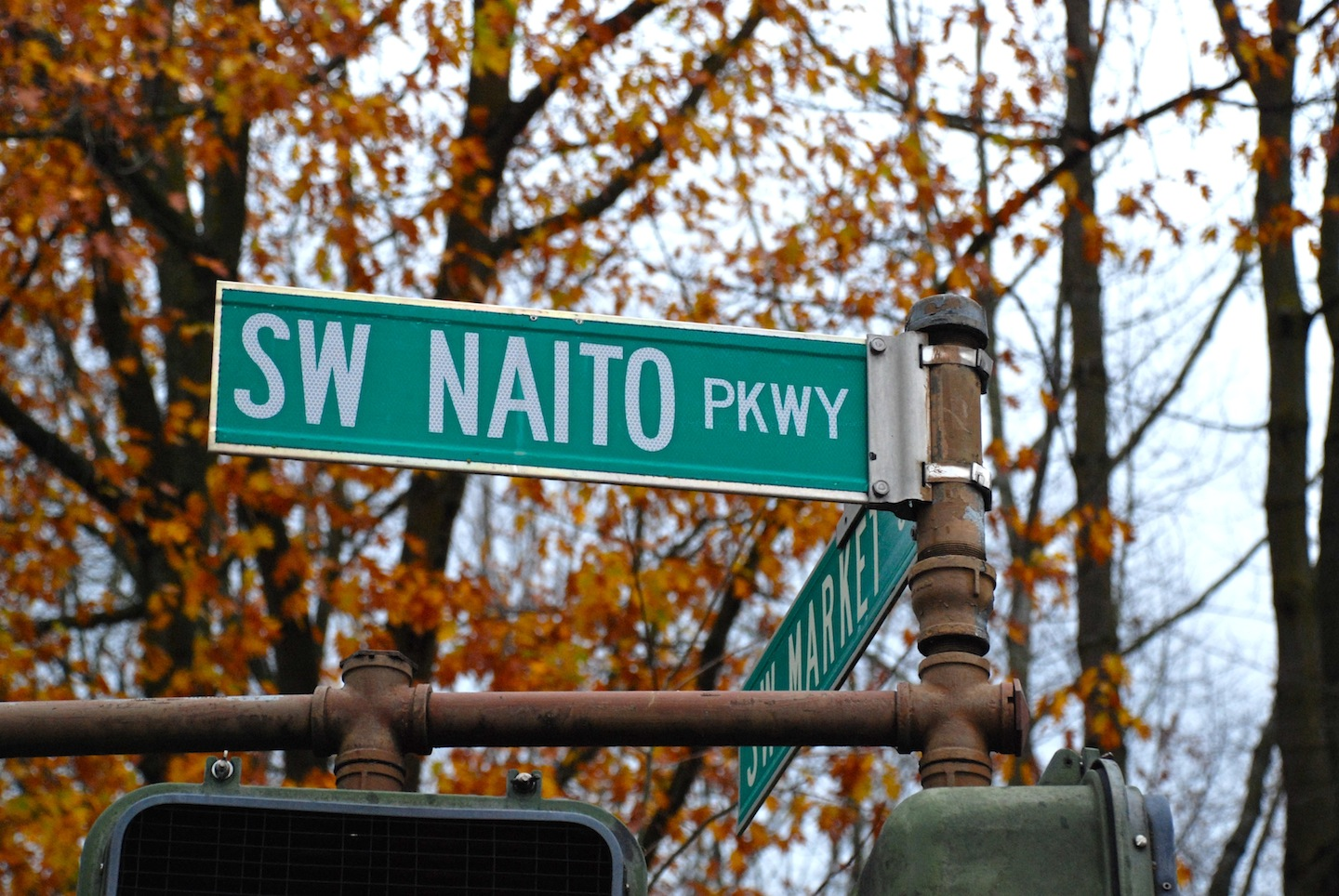
Front Avenue in downtown was renamed Naito Parkway in honor of Bill Naito, in 1996.

Bill Naito died in Portland of cancer on May 8, 1996, only eight days after being diagnosed with the disease. In June, the Portland city council decided to honor him by renaming Front Avenue in his memory. The new name, "Naito Parkway", was applied to the section of Front Avenue south of NW 15th Avenue and the Fremont Bridge. Naito Parkway is an arterial street running along the eastern edge of downtown and alongside Tom McCall Waterfront Park, passing some of the historic districts Naito helped to preserve.

The Portland Business Alliance (formerly the Portland Chamber of Commerce) bestows an annual leadership and service award, which for a time was named the "William S. Naito Outstanding Service Award" and currently is called the "William S. Naito Leadership Award". The city's Urban Forestry Commission created an annual award in honor of Naito, its founder, entitled the Bill Naito Community Trees Award. It has been given each year since 1997.

In 2007, Reed College renamed a residence hall in memory of Naito. Naito graduated from Reed in 1949 and was elected to the college's board of trustees in 1974.

In August 2009, a new public fountain was dedicated in Waterfront Park and named the Bill Naito Legacy Fountain. It is located between the Burnside Bridge and Ash Street in the park, at the site (since 2009) of the Portland Saturday Market.

== Bill Naito Properties, Inc. ==
After Bill Naito's death, a rift developed between his immediate family and his brother Sam and Sam's family with regard to the management and focus of their company. After several years of trying to work out their business differences, the two groups decided in 2005 to settle their long-running dispute by dividing the assets of the now-$100 million empire, H. Naito Corporation. Sam Naito took full control of the Made in Oregon chain of retail stores, while H. Naito Corporation's real estate holdings went to Bill Naito's heirs, who formed a new real estate management company, Bill Naito Properties, Inc., to manage those assets. Bill Naito's widow, Micki, was named chair of the board of directors of Bill Naito Properties.

== See also ==
- Old Town Chinatown, Portland, Oregon
