= Central Building =

Central Building may refer to:

- Central Building (Hong Kong)
- Central Building (Seattle), Washington, United States
- BMW Central Building, Leipzig, Germany
- New York Central Building
