= University of Minnesota Armory =

- U.S. Historic district – Contributing property
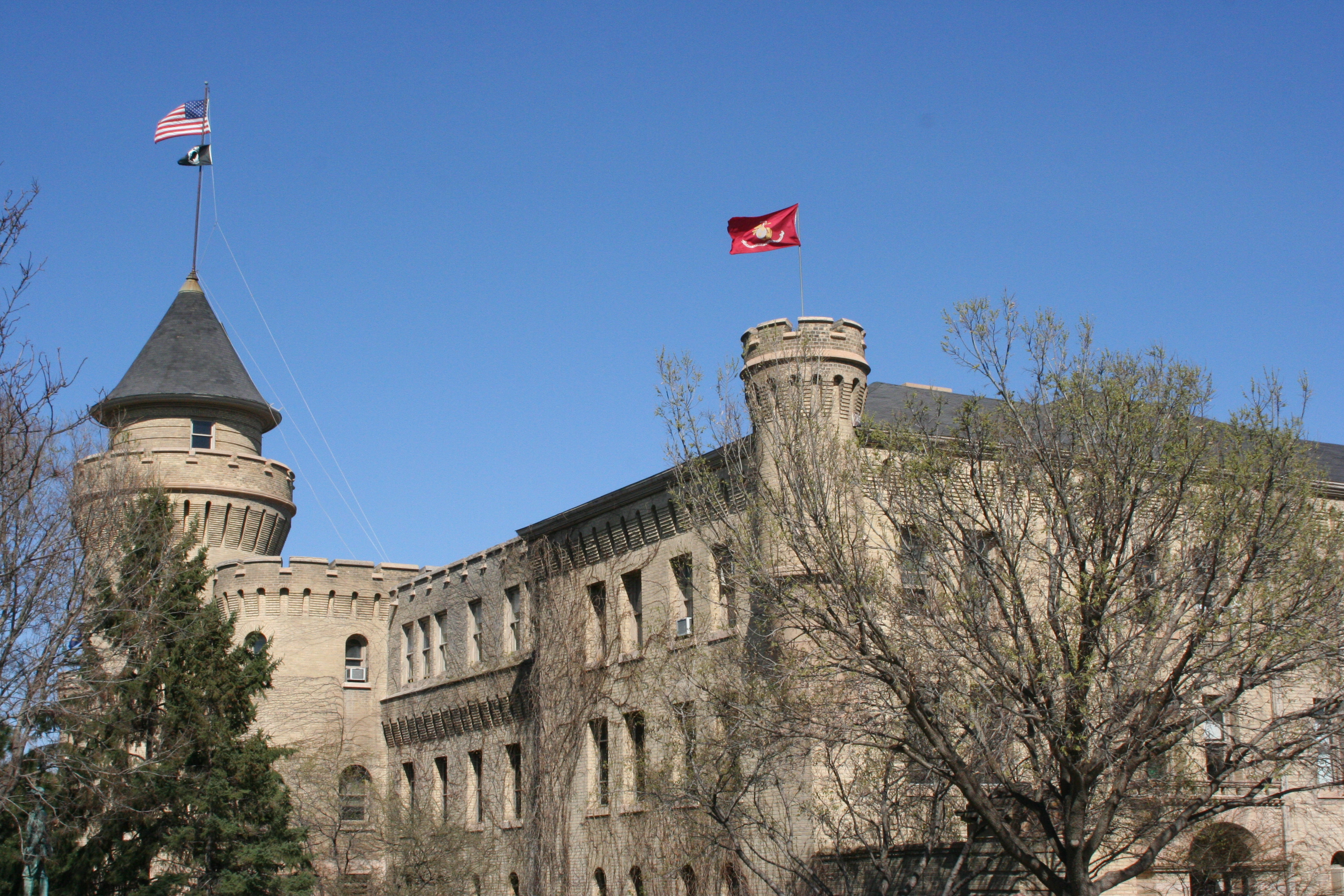
- University of Minnesota Armory
- Location: Minneapolis, Minnesota
- Coordinates: 44°58′37″N 93°13′56″W
- Built: 1896
- Architect: Charles Ronald Aldrich
- Part of: University of Minnesota Old Campus Historic District (ID84001463)
- Designated CP: August 23, 1984

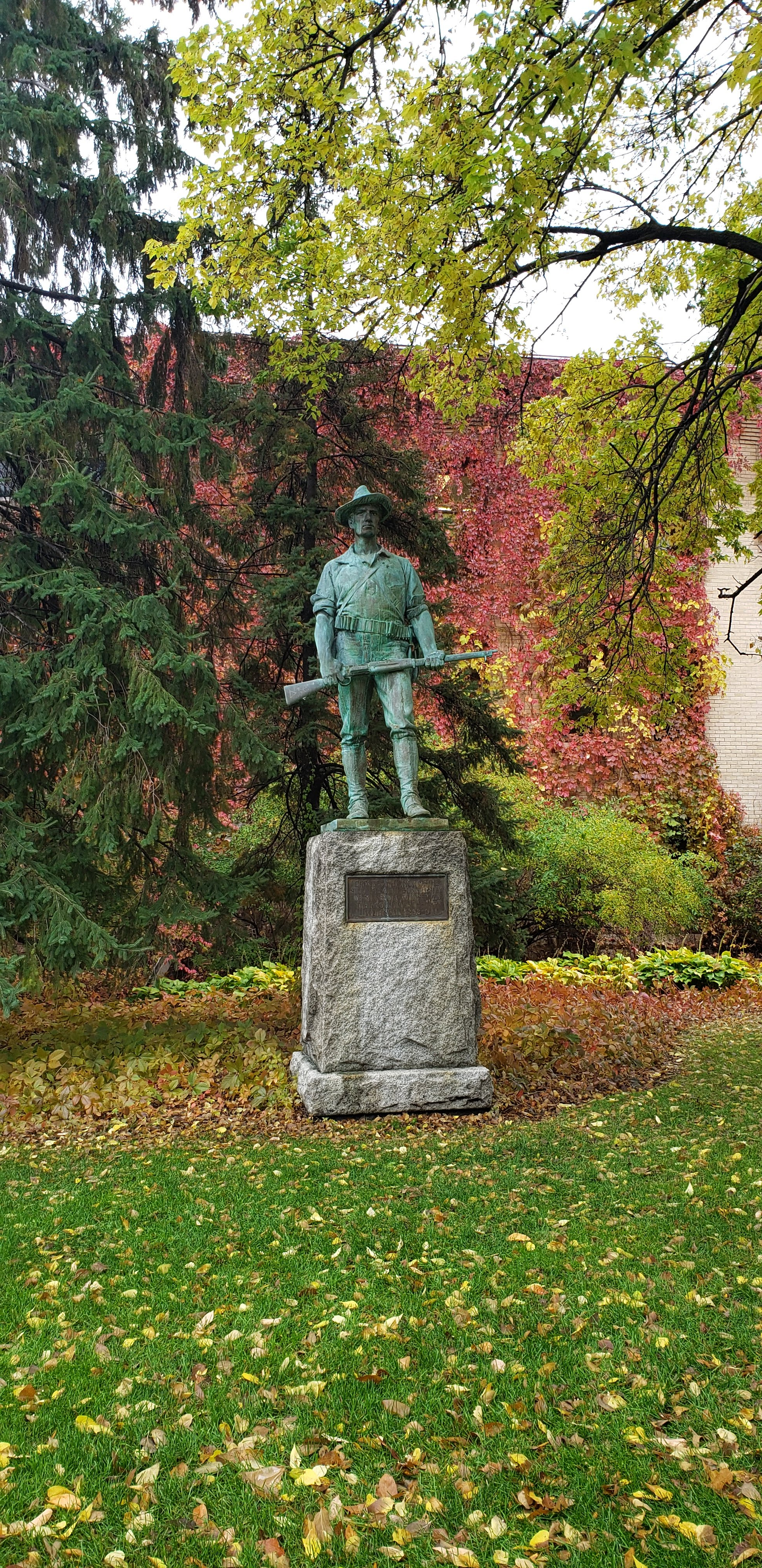
The Hiker memorial which stands outside the Armory.

The University of Minnesota Armory is a building on the University of Minnesota campus in Minneapolis, Minnesota.

== History ==
The Armory was constructed in 1896 after the previous space for military training on the campus burnt in a fire in 1894. The facility served as the primary home for the Minnesota Golden Gophers men's basketball team as well as the University of Minnesota Marching Band after its construction. The basketball team moved to the Kenwood Armory in Downtown Minneapolis in 1925 while the band moved to the newly completed Music Education Building in 1922. Fielding H. Yost, Michigan Wolverines football coach, forgot the Little Brown Jug, one of the oldest college football traveling trophies, in the locker rooms of the Armory in 1903. The Armory was also the facility used for the University of Minnesota physical education department until 1935. The school's football team played some of their early games on the open field next to the Armory.

It is a contributing property in the University of Minnesota Old Campus Historic District, a historic district that is listed on the National Register of Historic Places.

=== Current use ===
Currently, it is used as the classrooms and office space of the University's three ROTC units, and offices for the University's program for High School students, with the gymnasium being available for campus activities.

== The Hiker memorial ==
Outside the Armory building, there is a nine foot tall statue of a soldier on a seven-ton, six-foot-high Vermont granite pedestal. It is called The Hiker, a memorial plaque underneath reads: "erected in honor of the students of the University who served their country in the war with Spain, 1898-99”. Sculptor Theo Alice Ruggles Kitson designed the statue, which was commissioned and paid for by a committee that had originally been formed to send Christmas gifts to student soldiers in the 13th Minnesota Infantry Regiment, who were stationed in Manila. Professor Arthur E. Haynes, who chaired this committee, suggested doing something more than just sending gifts. He donated the first ten dollars and led the fundraising and process of designing the statue. It was unveiled in 1906.
