= Charles Ronald Aldrich =

American architect

- Born: July 12, 1866; Utica, Michigan, U.S.
- Died: June 30, 1939 (aged 72)
- Education: University of Minnesota
- Occupation: Architect
- Buildings: University of Minnesota Armory; Judson-Rives Building; Central Building; Olds, Wortman & King

Charles Ronald Aldrich (July 12, 1866 – June 30, 1939) was an architect active in Minnesota in the late 19th century and the west coast of the United States in the early 20th century.

== Life and career ==
Aldrich was born in Utica, Michigan on July 12, 1866. In 1885, he and his family moved to Minnesota, where he earned a Bachelors of Science in mechanical engineering from the University of Minnesota in 1888. After graduating, Aldrich worked as an architect and instructor at his alma-mater, and in 1899, he opened his own practice in the area.

In 1905, Aldrich relocated to Seattle. He was listed as a draftsman in 1905, worked as an architect for the Trustee Company from 1905 to 1910, and then as a principal architect for his own firm from 1910 to 1914. He partnered with G.A. Hunt from 1911 to 1914.

Aldrich died on June 30, 1939.

== Architectural style ==
Buildings designed by Aldrich were often understated and featured spare use of revival style decorative elements, particularly Beaux Arts.

== Works ==
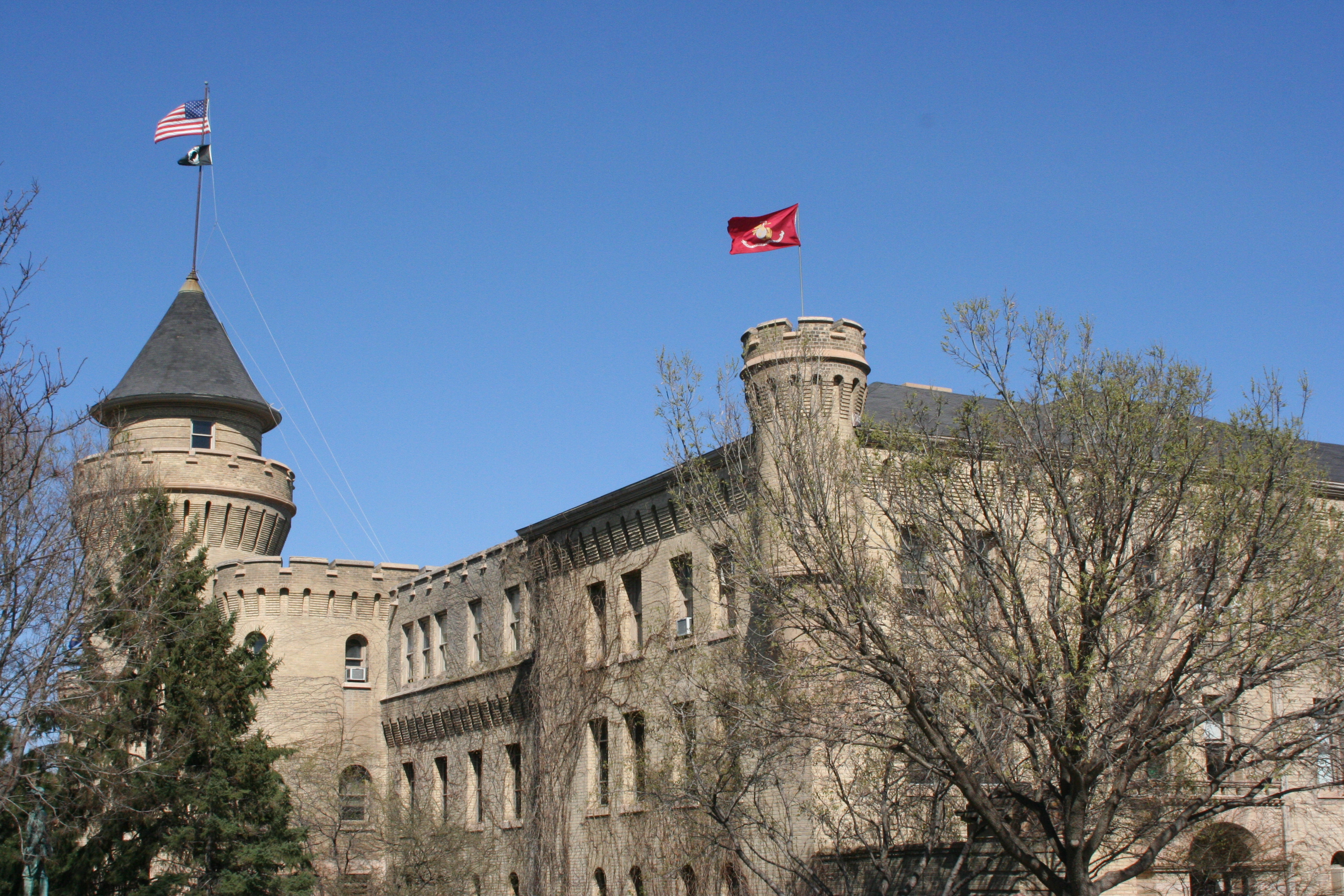
University of Minnesota Armory

Aldrich's significant works include:

=== Minneapolis–Saint Paul ===
- C.R. Aldrich House, Saint Anthony Park, (1895)
- University of Minnesota Armory, 15 Church Street SE (1895-1896), NRHP-listed
- Dr. M.H. Reynolds House, Blake Avenue and Langford Park West (1900)

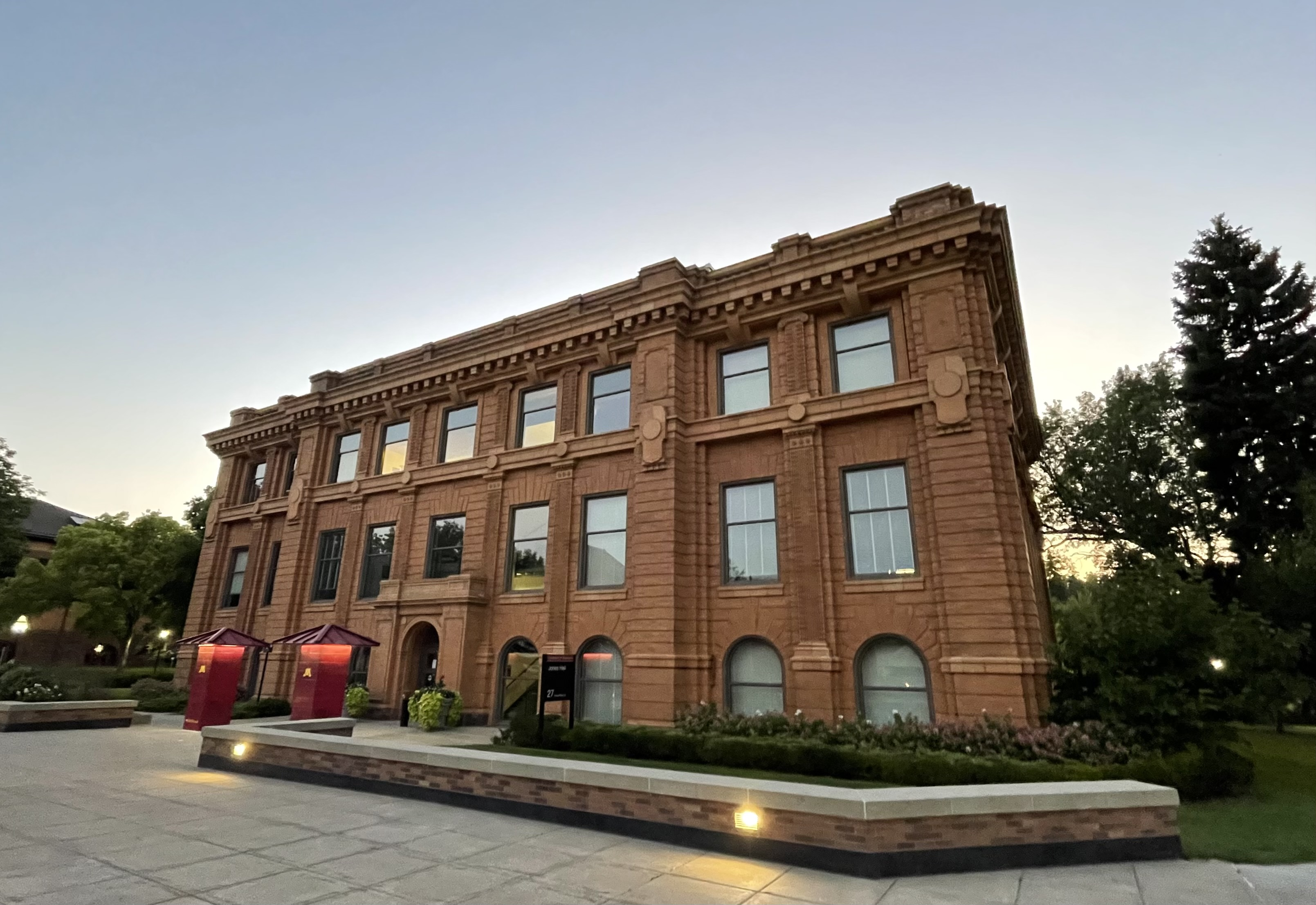
University of Minnesota Physics Building

- University of Minnesota Physics Building, (1900-1901), NRHP-listed
- Independent Order of Odd Fellows (IOOF) Hall (1902)
- University of Minnesota State Farm Chemical Laboratory (1902)
- Minneapolis Public Library, John S. Pillsbury Branch (1902-1904)

=== Elsewhere in Minnesota ===
- Saint John's University Gymnasium (aka "Guild Hall"), Collegeville (1901)
- Thief River Falls High School, Thief River Falls (1902)

=== Elsewhere ===
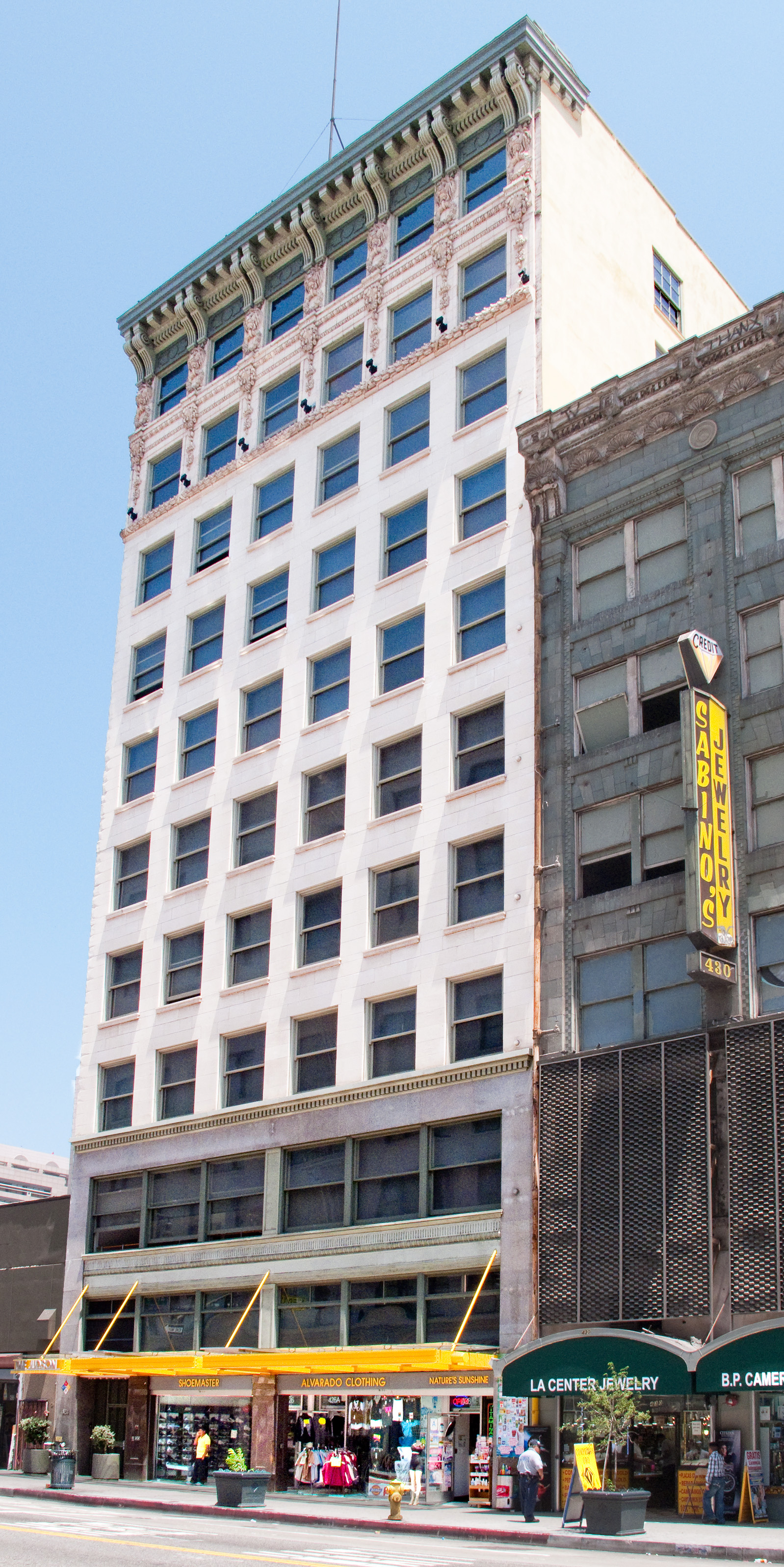
Judson-Rives Building

- Judson-Rives Building, 424 S. Broadway, Los Angeles, California (1906-7), NRHP-listed
- Central Building, Seattle, Washington (1909)
- Olds, Wortman and King Department Store, Portland, Oregon (1910), NRHP-listed
- Fleischmann's Yeast Factory, Sumner, Washington
