= Le Cordon Bleu College of Culinary Arts in Portland =

Culinary school

- Former names: Western Culinary Institute; Horst Mager Culinary Institute
- Type: For-profit college
- Active: 1983–2017
- President: Jon Alberts
- Academic staff: 135
- Undergraduates: 950
- Location: Portland, Oregon, United States; 45.52021°N 122.68141°W
- Campus: Urban
- Nickname: WCI
- Website: www.chefs.edu/portland/

The Le Cordon Bleu College of Culinary Arts in Portland, formerly the Western Culinary Institute (WCI), was a culinary school located in downtown Portland, Oregon, United States. The school was owned by the Career Education Corporation and it was also a partner with the French culinary institute Le Cordon Bleu. The school became affiliated with Le Cordon Bleu in 1999 and changed its name from the Western Culinary Institute in January 2010.

This and all other Cordon Bleu colleges in the United States closed in 2017.

== History ==
Western Culinary Institute was established in 1983, by two local businessmen, Horst Mager and Donald Waldbauer, as the Horst Mager Culinary Institute. In 1986, it adopted the name, Western Culinary Institute. The school was purchased by the Career Education Corporation in 1996. In 1999, WCI partnered with Le Cordon Bleu so that their graduating students could get a Le Cordon Bleu dîplome along with a specialized associate degree in culinary arts, hospitality and restaurant management, or pâtisserie and baking. In 2000, WCI was the first school to offer the Le Cordon Bleu Restaurant Management Diploma, although as of 2008, it does not have a restaurant management program. A lawsuit started in March 2008 against the school became a class action lawsuit in December 2009. The lawsuit claims Western Culinary and its parent company committed fraud with its recruitment practices.

== Campus ==
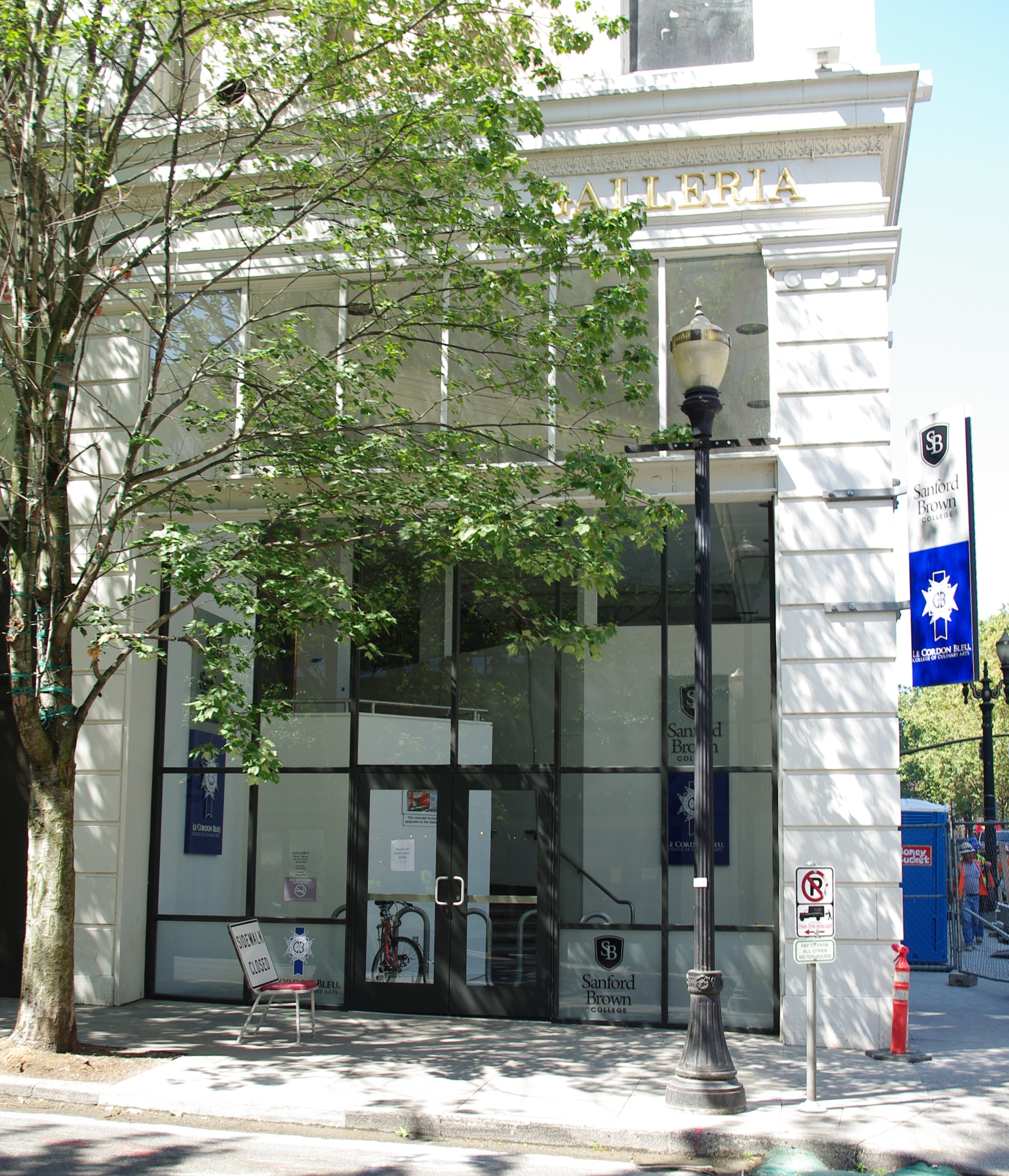
Entrance to the school

The school was located in downtown Portland, in the historic Galleria Building, which it moved to in 2003. The campus included classrooms, labs, kitchens, a computer lab, and a library/resource center. A student-staffed fine dining restaurant was also offered until early 2012.

== Academics and associations ==
The curriculum offered two programs, in which students can earn a diploma or an Associate of Occupational Studies (AOS) in either culinary arts or pâtisserie and baking. Students also earned a Le Cordon Blue diplôme (Diplôme de Cuisine or Diplôme de Pâtisserie). The diploma programs lasted 30 to 36 weeks, and the AOS program lasted 60 weeks. The institute was an affiliate with many culinary and educational associations and organizations, including the American Culinary Federation.

Western Culinary Institute was accredited by the Accrediting Commission of Career Schools and Colleges (ACCSC).

== Legal issues ==
Two women filed a class-action lawsuit against Western Culinary Institute and its corporate parent in March 2008, alleging the private trade school misleads students with its sales pitches and leaves them ill-prepared to pay off their large student loans. According to the complaint, the school failed to warn students that their tuition would exceed their ability, upon graduation, to pay off their federal loans. The complaint alleged the school also misrepresented its job-placement rate and failed to disclose that students would "not obtain material benefit" from the course of study. The lawsuit was settled in 2018.
