= Olds, Wortman & King =

Historic building in Portland, Oregon, U.S.

- Olds, Wortman & King Department Store
- U.S. National Register of Historic Places
- Portland Historic Landmark
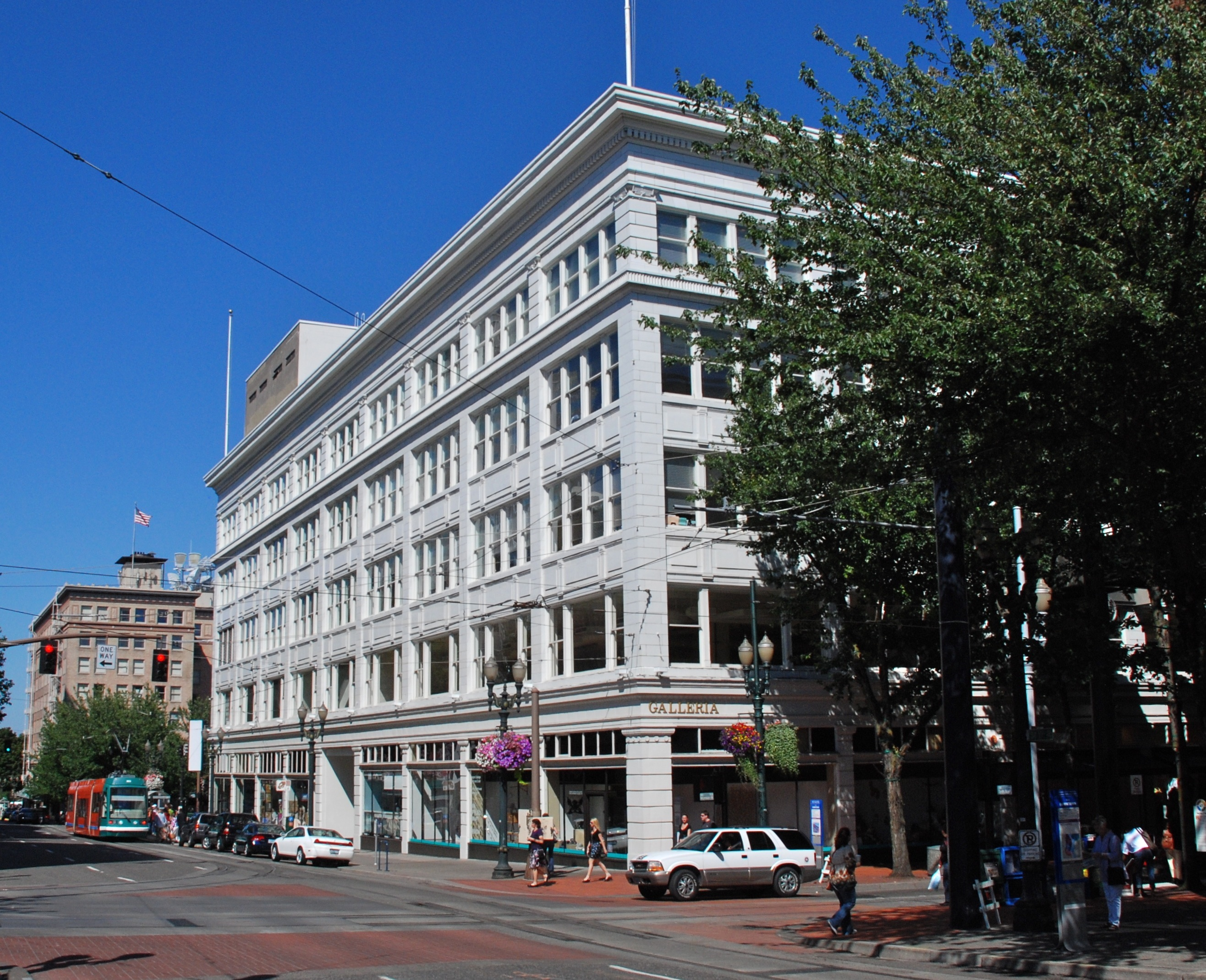
- Olds, Wortman & King building in 2011.

- Location within Portland, Oregon Location within Oregon Location within the United States
- Location: 921 SW Morrison Street; Portland, Oregon
- Coordinates: 45°31′13″N 122°40′53″W
- Area: 0.92 acres (0.37 ha)
- Built: 1910
- Architect: Charles Ronald Aldrich; Doyle, Patterson & Beach (interior)
- Architectural style: 20th Century American Commercial
- NRHP reference No.: 91000057
- Added to NRHP: February 20, 1991

Olds, Wortman & King, also known as Olds & King, was a department store in Portland, Oregon, United States, established under a different name in 1851 and becoming Olds & King in 1878, on its third change of ownership. The store was renamed Olds, Wortman & King in 1901; Olds & King again in 1944; and Rhodes in 1960. Moving several times within the downtown Portland area, the store settled at 10th & Morrison in 1910, in a large new building that remained in operation as a department store until 1974 and is now listed on the National Register of Historic Places. Since 1976, the building has been known as The Galleria.

== History ==
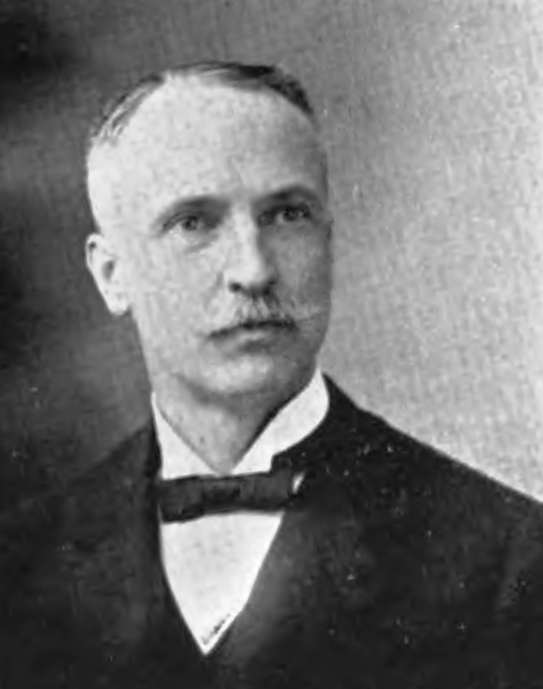
William P. Olds

The company traces its ancestry to a small store established in 1851 by Henry Corbett at the intersection of Front and Oak streets in downtown Portland; it was the city's first general merchandise store. Later in the 1850s, the store moved to Front & Taylor and was operated by brothers Robert and Finley McLaren, although Corbett continued to be a principal supplier of goods for the store. John Wilson purchased the store in 1856. Wilson's store moved in 1868, to Front Street near Morrison Street. In 1878, Wilson sold the shop to William Parker Olds, who had worked as a clerk there since 1869, and Olds' stepfather, Samuel Willard King, and the business became Olds & King, or Olds & King's. At that time, the store was located at 147 3rd Street. It moved again in 1881, 1887 and 1891, but never very far.

John Wortman joined the firm in 1890, and later Hardy C. Wortman also purchased into it, leading eventually to its renaming as Olds, Wortman & King at the beginning of 1901. The store's location since 1891 was 5th & Washington, but growth in business led the owners to begin planning in 1908 for a move to a larger building.

=== Landmark store ===
In 1909–1910, the company built its large new store in the block bounded by Morrison, Alder, 10th and 9th streets in downtown. The new building was five stories tall, plus a basement, and was the first store in the Northwest to occupy an entire city block (200 by 200 feet (61 m × 61 m) in downtown Portland). The site had previously been occupied by the mansion of Sylvester Pennoyer, a former Oregon governor (1886–1895) and Portland mayor (1896–1898). The new store opened on July 30, 1910, with an estimated 25,000 people visiting on opening day. The old store was closed upon the opening of the new one. The new location was criticized by some as being too far from the central business district, which generally extended a few blocks from the waterfront at that time, but within a few years the business district had expanded westwards.

The building's interior was designed by the Portland architectural firm of Doyle, Patterson & Beach. The store included a 53-by-33-foot (16 m × 10 m) atrium in the center, topped by a large skylight and was equipped with other amenities that were considered very modern for the time, at least in a city the size of Portland. Among these were the elevators, six in total (in two banks of three), which rose and descended in exposed shafts facing the atrium, within ironwork cages. Each was controlled by an elevator operator. Also considered novel and advanced at the time were the glass display cases illuminated with "hidden electric lights" and a telephone-based credit system that enabled instant verification of a customer's credit status, making purchasing on credit simpler and faster than previously. There was a tea room with mahogany furniture, a nursery and children's playroom, and a roof garden. A 1926 remodeling replaced the hardwood floors in the main aisles with marble.

The building's white exterior is lined with relatively simple terra cotta designs. There are rusticated columns at street level. Each of the roof's four corners is topped by a tall flagpole. The store had one entrance on each of its four sides, all but one in the center of the block.

=== Ownership changes, second store ===
The company was bought in 1925 by the B.F. Schlesinger Company (which also owned The City of Paris store in San Francisco, Schlesinger & Sons in Oakland, and Rhodes Brothers in Tacoma). At that time, Olds, Wortman & King was one of the largest retail businesses in the city and was employing 1,200 people. In 1941, B.F. Schlesinger Company changed its name to Western Department Stores, Inc. In 1944, the name of its Portland subsidiary was shortened again to Olds & King. A five-year remodeling in 1946–51, led by Portland architect Pietro Belluschi, included replacement of the passenger elevators with more modern ones, installation of escalators and closure of the atrium (in 1949), among other changes.

Western opened a second Olds & King store in Portland's then-new Gateway Shopping Center (at NE 102nd Avenue and Halsey Street) in 1956, but in 1960 Western changed its name to Rhodes Western and renamed as "Rhodes" all of its stores that were not already using that name (prior to this, Western had also operated stores under two other names, Kahn's and Olds & King). The 13-store Rhodes chain was taken over by AMFAC Merchandising Corporation, parent of Liberty House, in 1969. The Gateway Rhodes became a Liberty House store in late 1973. The downtown Rhodes store, the last in Portland to carry the Rhodes name, closed on February 2, 1974. The building remained vacant for some time.

== The Galleria ==
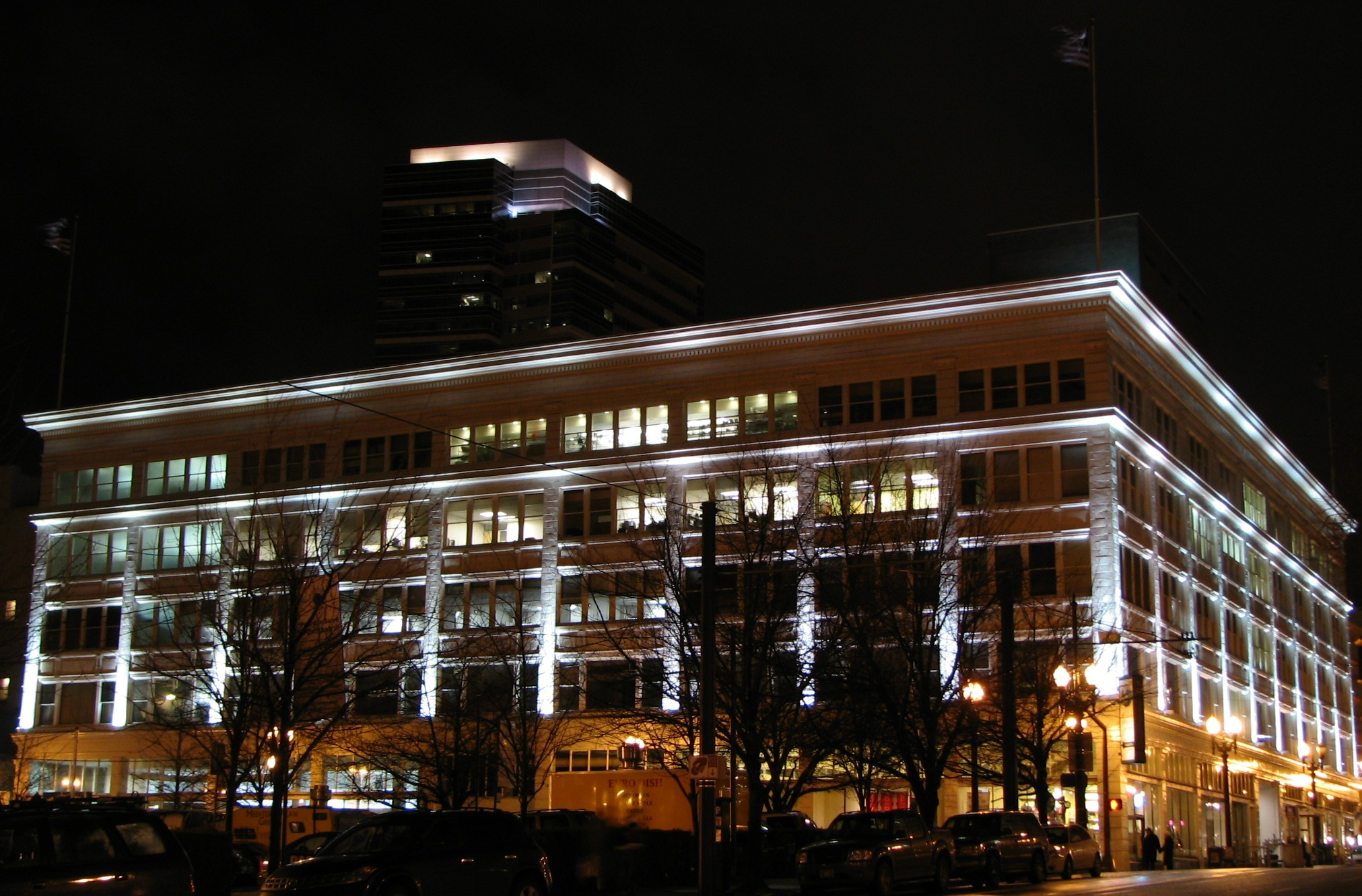
The Galleria at night

In 1975, Portland developers Bill Naito and Sam Naito purchased the building and began converting it into a multi-level shopping center, which they named The Galleria. Opened in 1976, the Galleria was an indoor shopping arcade for dozens of small stores and restaurants, and has been described as downtown Portland's first shopping mall. Retail shops and restaurants occupied the first three floors, while floors 4 and 5 were leased to companies in the wholesale apparel business.

Three months after the Galleria's opening, The Oregonian newspaper referred to the project as being possibly "the most exciting development in downtown [Portland] merchandising in several decades." In the mid-1970s, retailing was increasingly migrating from the city center to new suburban shopping malls, and fewer and fewer shoppers were coming to downtown, a trend that the Naitos hoped to slow or reverse through this project and others. The renovations included opening up the interior by restoring the 1949-closed central atrium and adding a large central stairway. By 1977, when the reconfigured building reached full occupancy, 48 merchants were leasing space there. The "recycled landmark" was popular with shoppers from the very start and continued to thrive for several years. However, the opening of Pioneer Place in 1990 was a significant blow to the Galleria and the beginning of its gradual decline as a multi-store shopping mall. Most retail use of the building has since been supplanted by various other uses.

The building was added to the National Register of Historic Places in 1991, as the "Olds, Wortman and King Department Store". From 2003 to 2017, it was home to the Portland location of the Le Cordon Bleu College of Culinary Arts (formerly the Western Culinary Institute), on the 5th floor. Sanford–Brown college's Portland campus was on the 4th floor until its closure in 2014. The ground floor formerly had a Brooks Brothers store, from 2008 to 2018. A Le Cordon Bleu restaurant on the ground floor closed in 2020.

A MAX light rail station, Galleria/SW 10th Avenue station, was opened next to the building in 1986, across the street from its Morrison Street side. Since 2001, the Portland Streetcar line has passed the Galleria's west side, on 10th Avenue.

In spring 2011, it was reported that Target Corporation was considering remodeling the Galleria's second and third floors as a Target store, which would be that chain's first Portland store set in a dense, urban location rather than a suburban-style environment. This proposal was continuing to advance in October 2011, following the approval by the city's Historic Landmarks Commission of the proposed modifications to the building's interior. Construction began in February 2012, and the store opened in July 2013. It operated for more than 10 years, but closed in October 2023.

== See also ==
- National Register of Historic Places listings in Southwest Portland, Oregon
