= Judson-Rives Building =

Building in Los Angeles, California

- U.S. Historic district – Contributing property
- Los Angeles Historic-Cultural Monument
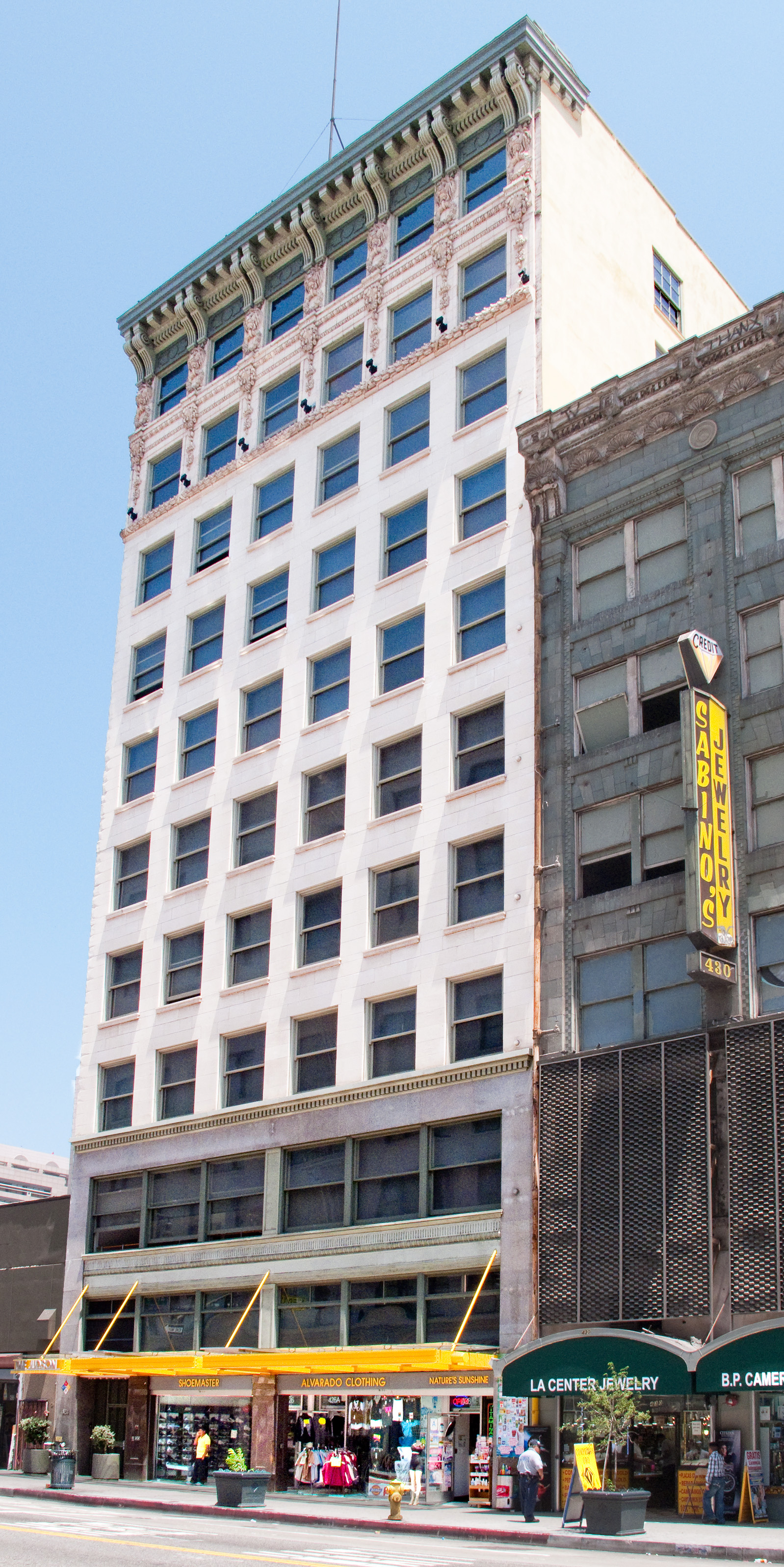
- The building in 2012

- Location within the Los Angeles metropolitan area
- Location: 424 S. Broadway, Los Angeles, California
- Coordinates: 34°02′56″N 118°14′59″W
- Built: 1906
- Architect: Charles Ronald Aldrich
- Architectural style: Beaux Arts
- Part of: Broadway Theater and Commercial District (ID79000484)
- LAHCM No.: 881

Significant dates
- Designated CP: May 9, 1979
- Designated LAHCM: December 20, 1989

Judson-Rives Building, originally the Broadway Central Building, also known as The Judson, is a historic ten story high-rise located at 424 S. Broadway in the Broadway Theater District in the historic core of downtown Los Angeles.

== History ==
Judson-Rives Building, originally the Broadway Central Building, was designed by Charles Ronald Aldrich for the Trustee Company of Los Angeles and built in 1906. The Trustee Company also had their offices located on the building's second story.

In 1928, Judson Rives took over ownership of the building, at which point the building was renamed after him. Rives installed new elevators and remodeled the lobby in 1929, and he maintained ownership of the building until 1934.

A multi-colored neon marquee was added to the building in the 1930s, then replaced by a plainer one in the 1970s.

A fire sometime around 1966 significantly damaged the building's interior, after which steel studded walls were erected set-in from the perimeter walls. The steel walls were later dismantled, leaving their frame exposed. The building corridors were also remodeled in 1983, per a fire department order.

In 1979, the Broadway Theater and Commercial District was added to the National Register of Historic Places, with Judson-Rives Building listed as a contributing property in the district. The building was listed as Los Angeles Historic Cultural Monument No. 881 in 2007.

In 2005, the building was purchased then converted into a 60-unit residential apartment complex named The Judson, which opened in 2008. David Gray Architects led the conversion.

=== Broadway Theatre ===
The building's ground floor space, originally a shoe store, was bought by Metropolitan Theatres, who built the Broadway Theatre, designed by Lawrence McConville, in the space. The theater opened in 1924 and was the first of fifteen theaters owned by Metropolitan Theatres on Broadway.

In 1973, the theater was renamed Teatro Broadway as it began playing Spanish language cinema. In 1988, it was removed, after which the ground floor was re-converted to retail.

== Architecture and design ==
Judson-Rives Building features Beaux Arts architecture and is made of steel-framed concrete and brick with a granite, sandstone, and glazed terra cotta facade.

The building's front-facing west facade is six bays wide and is arranged in a base-shaft-capital composition up to the eighth floor, with an entablature separating the base from the shaft between the second and third floors. The facade also features large cornice above the capital and an egg and dart stringcourse separating the ninth and tenth floors. Lion heads supported by wreaths are featured between the top windows.

The building is C-shaped in plan and wraps around a rectangular light court at its southern elevation. The southern elevation also features hipped skylights on its first and second floor roofs, while the upper floors feature nearly continuous wood sash windows clad in sheet metal, all of which provide light to interior offices. The cornice from the western facade also continues on this elevation. The building's east and north elevations are utilitarian in design.

Inside, the building's original entrance features a marble and terrazzo-finished floor that spell out "ENTRANCE" and "BUILDING 424". The building features two elevators, with dark-stained wood trim surrounding them on the first floor. The first floor also contains a barrel vault vestibule that houses a stairwell to the basement and second floor. The barrel vault itself is divided into five segments and features a vaulting course decorated in a dog-tooth pattern, with marble veneer below. The second floor features chair rails, baseboard, and coffered wood ceilings.

== See also ==
- List of contributing properties in the Broadway Theater and Commercial District
- List of Los Angeles Historic-Cultural Monuments in Downtown Los Angeles
