= White Stag sign =

Sign in Portland, Oregon, U.S.

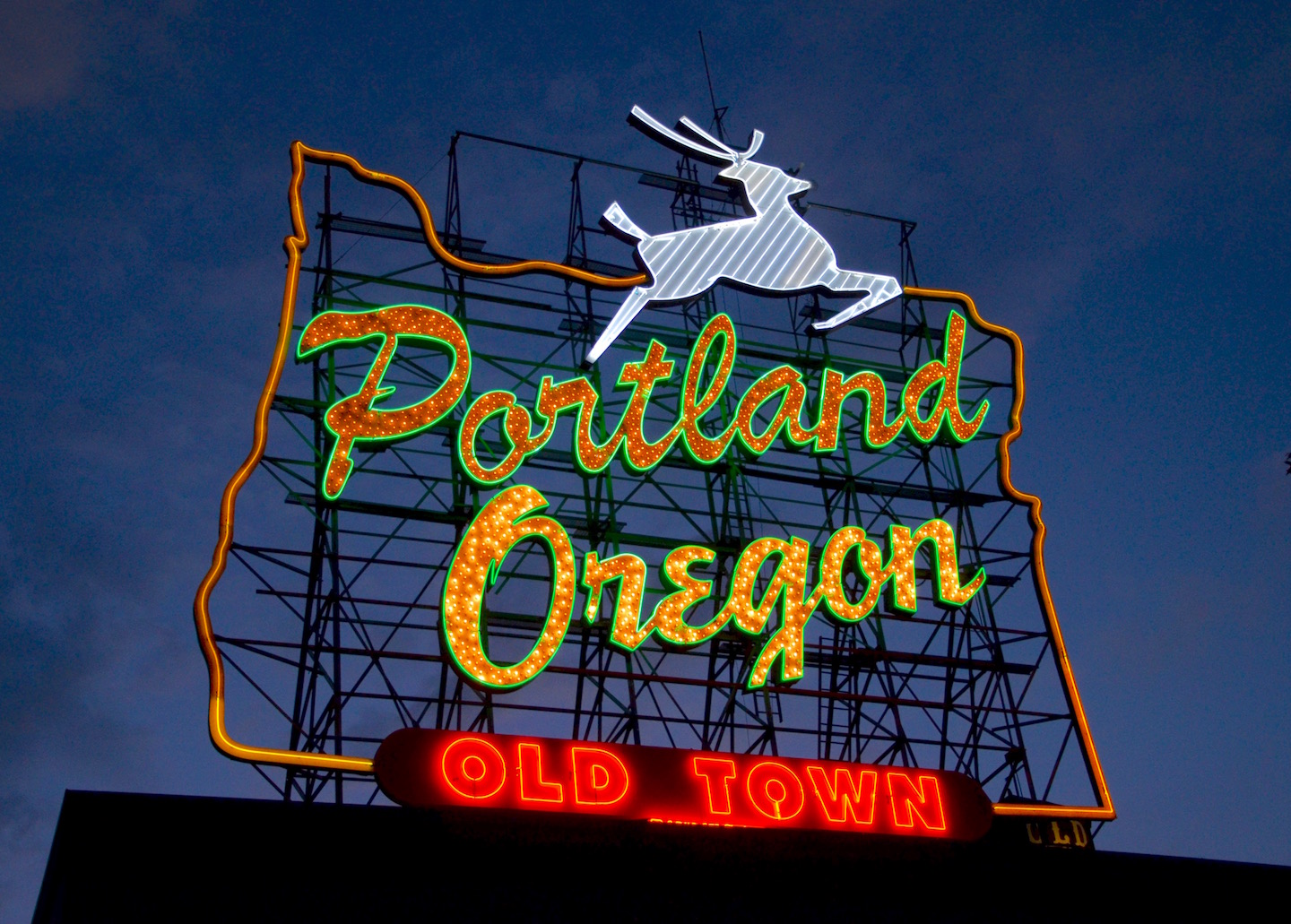
- The White Stag sign displaying the wording it has carried since November 2010

- Location within Portland, Oregon
- Former names: White Satin Sugar sign (1940–1957); Made in Oregon sign (1997–2010)
- Alternative names: "Portland Oregon" sign (since 2010)

General information
- Type: neon-and-incandescent-bulb sign
- Location: Portland, Oregon, 70 NW Couch Street (White Stag Building)
- Coordinates: 45°31′24.19″N 122°40′13.87″W
- Construction started: 1940
- Renovated: 1957; 1997; 2010
- Owner: Ramsay Signs (1940–2010); City of Portland (September 2010 to present)

Renovating team
- Renovating firm: White Stag Sportswear (1957); Naito Properties (1997); Venerable Properties (2010)

Other information
- Public transit: Old Town/Chinatown; Skidmore Fountain; 12, 20, 19

The White Stag sign, also known as the "Portland Oregon" sign, is a lighted neon-and-incandescent-bulb sign located atop the White Stag Building, at 70 NW Couch Street in downtown Portland, Oregon, United States, facing the Burnside Bridge. The sign faces westbound traffic as it enters downtown Portland coming across the Willamette River. The sign was acquired by the City of Portland in September 2010, and the lettering was changed to read "Portland Oregon" in November 2010.

During Christmas, the nose of the stag glows red in imitation of Rudolph the Red-Nosed Reindeer, and by the 1970s that feature had contributed to the sign's popularity as a local landmark. The sign was designated a City of Portland Historic Landmark in 1977. In 2014, Willamette Week referred to the "famous White Stag sign" as "one of the most instantly recognizable parts of the Portland skyline".

Since its installation in 1940 the sign has carried various messages and animations, generally advertising Portland companies, the longest-lasting version being for White Stag Sportswear, from 1957 until 1997.

== History ==
The city permit for the original sign was received on September 19, 1940. The sign was built soon afterward by Ramsay Signs, who also owned it, and was first illuminated around the end of October 1940. The sign read "White Satin Sugar" inside an outline of the state of Oregon, advertising a brand of sugar. In 1950, the sign was animated to show the state filling with sugar.

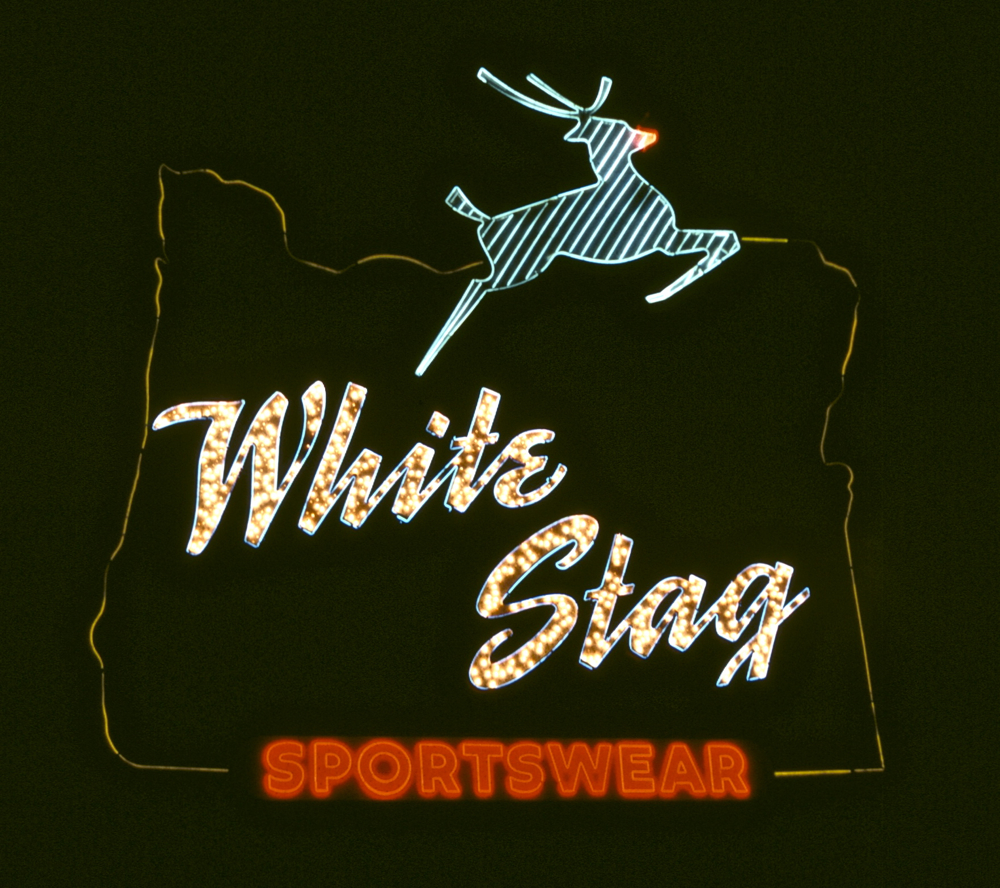
For 40 years the sign advertised White Stag Sportswear. This seasonal photo shows "Rudolph's" red nose.

In 1957, the sign was changed to advertise White Stag, an apparel manufacturer that owned the building and had occupied it since 1924. The lettering was changed to "Home of White Stag Sportswear" and a silhouette of a white stag was added to the top of the sign. For the 1959 Christmas season, a red neon "nose" was added to the stag's snout in imitation of Rudolph the Red-Nosed Reindeer, a tradition that has been repeated annually ever since.

White Stag was purchased by the Warnaco Group in 1966, and the company left the building in 1973. In 1972, the building was sold to the H. Naito Corporation and occupied by one of its divisions, Norcrest China Company, but Warnaco still paid for the sign's electricity and maintenance. In 1977, the sign, which had come to symbolize Portland, especially at Christmas time, was designated a City of Portland historic landmark. It continued to be owned by Ramsay Signs, who leased it to White Stag/Warnaco.

In 1986, White Stag moved out of Oregon entirely, but Warnaco continued to pay for the sign to be lit until May 1989, when the sign went dark. Bill Naito, president of the H. Naito Corporation, owner of the Norcrest China Company which occupied the building, agreed to pay for the sign's electricity for the Christmas season beginning in October, but trouble with the wiring led to the sign remaining dark until after Thanksgiving. With Naito paying the approximately $200-a-month electric bill and the Ramsay Sign company providing maintenance, the sign remained lit into the mid-1990s.

== Made in Oregon lettering ==
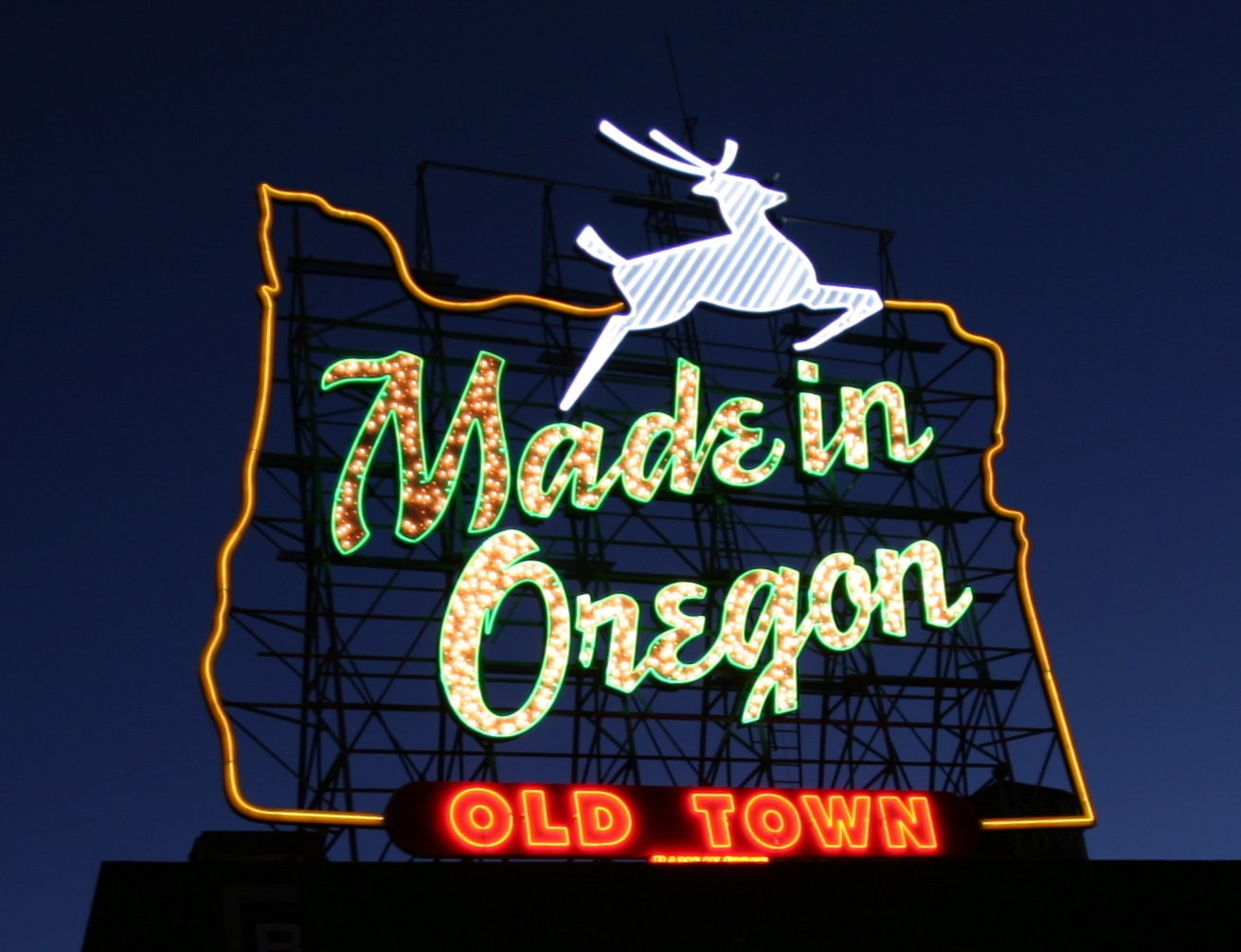
The sign's 1997–2010 appearance

Bill Naito died in 1996; later that year, Ramsay Signs and the H. Naito Corporation, now run by Bill's son Bob, got into a dispute about who would pay for deferred maintenance and repairs on the sign, with both sides threatening to either turn off the sign permanently or move it. Led by mayor Vera Katz, the city mediated the dispute, which resulted in Naito agreeing to continue to pay for the electricity and also pay for a long-term contract for Ramsay to maintain the sign. In exchange, Naito proposed that the sign's lettering be changed to advertise a Naito-owned gift retailing brand called Made in Oregon. Asserting that "the sign always has been maintained commercially," Portland's Historical Landmarks Commission approved the proposal by a 5–1 vote in April 1997 and the sign was altered that summer. Along with the change of "White Stag" to "Made in Oregon", the smaller neon lettering along the bottom of the sign was changed from "Sportswear" to "Old Town," indicating the location of the sign. Other elements of the design remained unaltered: the outline of Oregon and the leaping deer at the top.

== White Stag Block ==
In 2004, Naito closed the Norcrest China Company and two years later, sold the building to Venerable Properties, a real estate developer and management company. Venerable renovated the White Stag Building and two adjacent historic buildings, adding connections between them, to create a development called the White Stag Block.

== Controversy over proposed changes (2008–2009) ==
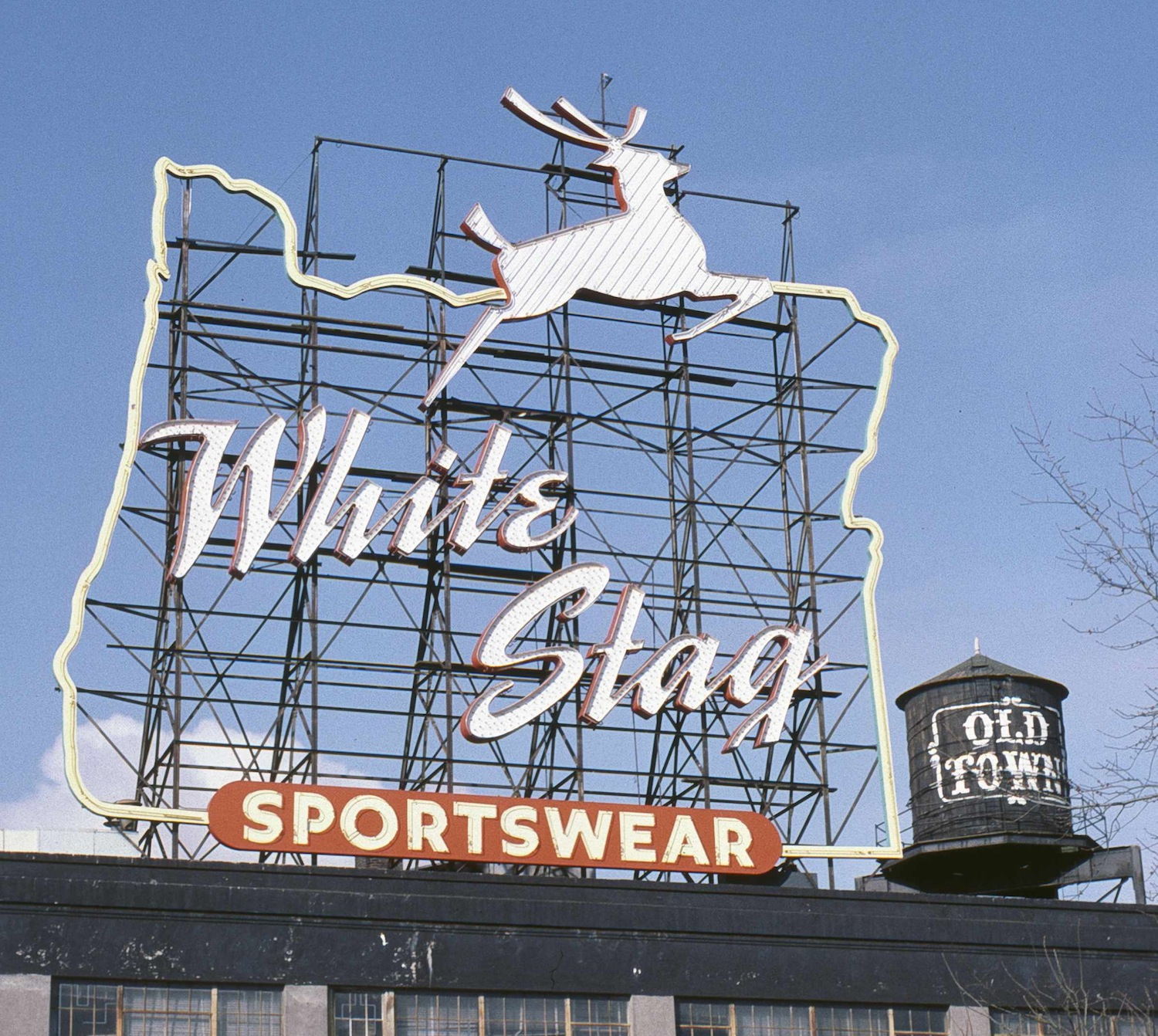
A daylight view in 1985, also showing the adjacent water tower

In 2008, the University of Oregon signed as the development's primary tenant, providing a more centralized home to its multiple Portland-based programs and offices in the state's largest urban center, more than 100 miles (160 km) away from the university's campus in Eugene.

In November 2008, Ramsay Signs proposed altering the display to read "University of Oregon," at the request of the new occupants of the building, whose lease of the property extended to the rooftop sign. The proposed change caused some uproar in the community, including some who viewed the promotion of an out-of-town university as inappropriate, and some who simply preferred to keep the existing lettering. In April 2009, the City of Portland and the University of Oregon reached a compromise wherein the sign's wording would read simply "Oregon." In July, the city's Historic Landmarks Commission approved the change in lettering, but rejected another part of the compromise in which the university planned to place its "O" logo in neon on the water tower adjacent to the sign, in place of the current, painted "Old Town" lettering on the tower. No new compromise was reached, and in late September 2009 the university decided not to renew its lease on the sign, leaving its future unclear.

== Acquisition by city of Portland ==
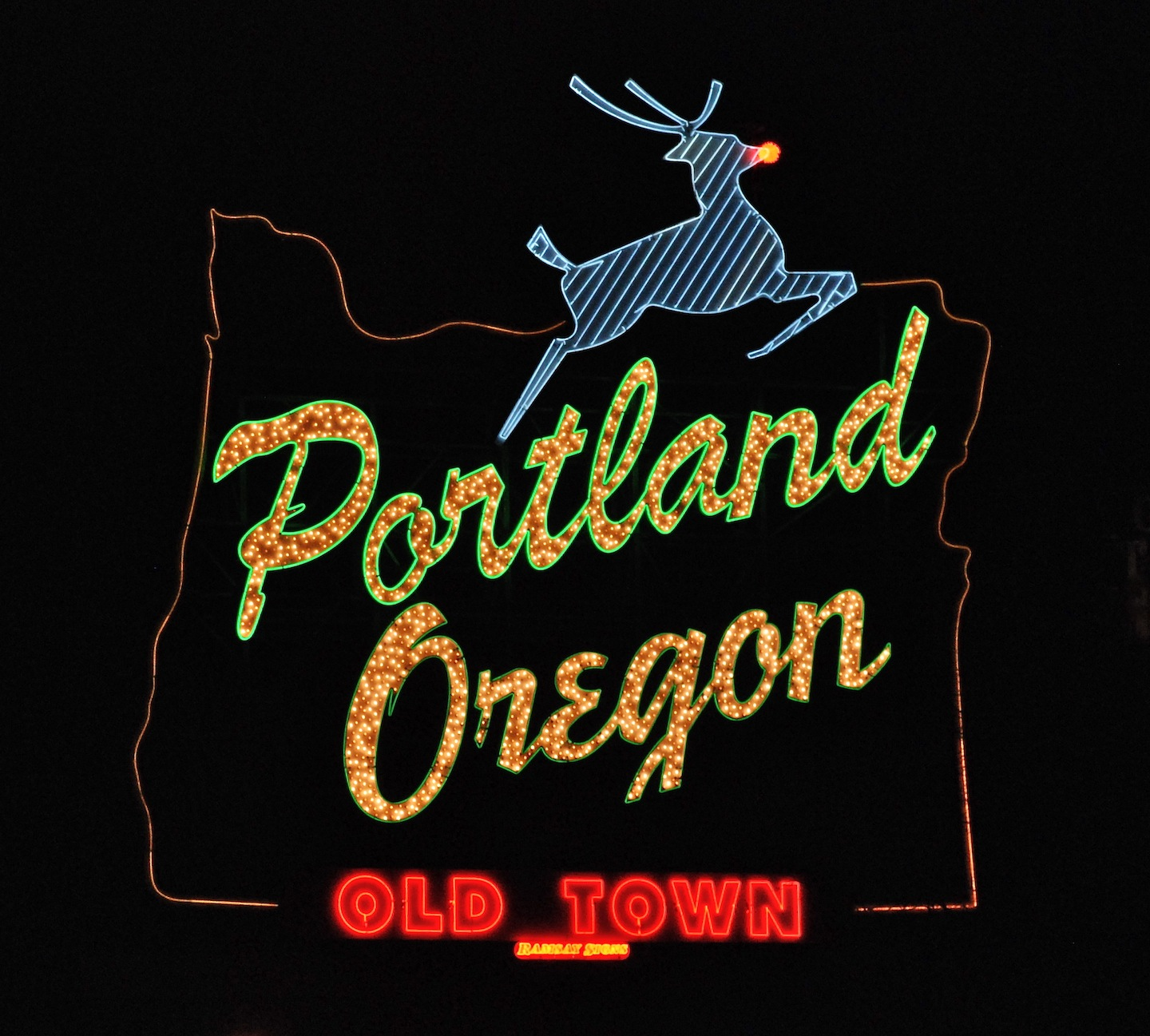
The sign at night with its current wording and the red "Rudolph" nose lit for the Christmas season

With the University of Oregon no longer paying for the sign, Ramsay Signs turned off the electricity in October 2009 and indicated that it might dismantle the sign. Led by city commissioner Randy Leonard, the city government began exploring options to save the landmark, including possibly changing the wording to read "Portland Oregon." The sign remained dark until the Friday before Thanksgiving, when it was illuminated to start the Christmas holiday season. It remained lit into January 2010, with electricity expenses paid by Ramsay Signs' then-president Darryl Paulsen.

In September 2010, the Portland City Council approved an agreement in which the city took ownership of the sign. Under the agreement, Ramsay Signs donated the sign to the city, and the city agreed to pay the company a monthly fee of $2,000 for sign maintenance and electricity using funds collected from a city-owned parking lot. Art DeMuro, president of Venerable Properties (which owns the building on which the sign sits), donated $200,000 to the city to have the lettering changed to "Portland Oregon" in time for a re-lighting ceremony on the day after Thanksgiving. The deal also stipulated that the city must keep Ramsay Signs' name on the sign. Work to change the sign began on the Tuesday of the week before Thanksgiving, and the altered sign was ceremonially turned on for the first time 10 days later, on November 26, 2010. At the time of the ceremony, two of the neon tubes in the stag's head had yet to be re-attached, but that work was completed within one week.

== Honors ==
In 2011, Ramsay Signs' work on the redesigned sign won the company First Place in the Historic Reproduction category of an annual design competition held by the International Sign Association.

== See also ==
- Portland sign
- Skidmore/Old Town Historic District: the 1907 White Stag Building on which the sign is located is a contributing property to the historic district
