= White Stag (clothing) =

American clothing company

- Type: Subsidiary
- Industry: Apparel
- Founded: 1907; 119 years ago
- Headquarters: United States
- Products: Sport clothing, sportswear
- Parent: Wal-Mart Stores, Inc.

White Stag is an American in-store brand of women's clothing and accessories sold by Walmart. Founded as a skiwear manufacturer in Portland, Oregon, the company was purchased by the Warnaco Group in 1966, which in turn sold the brand to Wal-Mart in 2003.

== Company origins ==
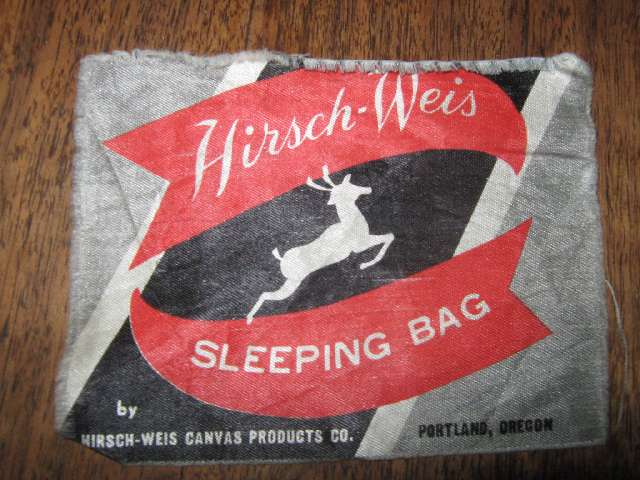
Tag from a Hirsch-Weis sleeping bag

The White Stag company began as an offshoot of the Hirsch-Weis Manufacturing Company of Portland, Oregon, which made durable outdoor clothing and supplies worn by loggers, mill hands, and stockmen. Hirsch-Weis was founded when brothers Max S. and Leopold B. Hirsch purchased the Willamette Tent and Awning Company, a manufacturer of sails for deepwater ships, from E. Henry Wemme in 1907. The Hirsch brothers renamed the company for themselves and Harry Weis, Wemme's secretary, whom the brothers retained as a partner with the new company. The company began to make more tents and catered to the logging industry; some of the company's first clothes were waterproof garments for loggers.

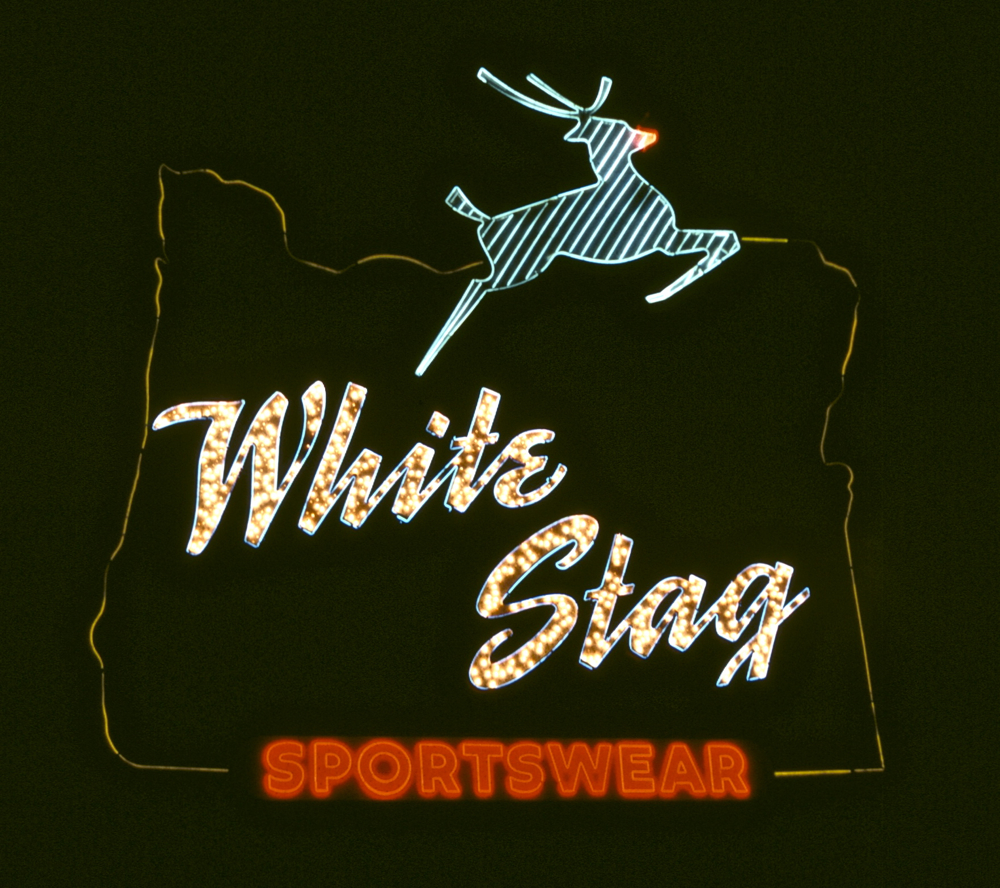
For 40 years this sign in Portland advertised White Stag Sportswear. This seasonal photo shows "Rudolph's" red nose.

In 1929, Harold S. Hirsch, Max's 21-year-old son, returned to Portland after graduating from Dartmouth College, where he had enjoyed skiing. He began making downhill skiing apparel, starting with a ski suit, which Hirsch-Weis began marketing in 1931 as White Stag, from the literal English translation of the parent company's names weis and hirsch.

Skiing, then in its infancy in the United States, was becoming popular in Oregon in the 1930s, and White Stag grew quickly, with the division expanding to include other types of casual sportswear.

== Company growth and acquisition by Warnaco ==
In 1956, reflecting the popularity of the sportswear line, Hirsch-Weis changed its name to White Stag.

The next year, the company modified a large animated sign on the roof of its downtown Portland building to include a stag leaping over an outline of the state of Oregon. It became a publicly traded company in 1958.

For the 1959 Christmas season, a red neon "nose" was added to the stag's snout in imitation of Rudolph the Red-Nosed Reindeer, a tradition that has been repeated annually ever since. The White Stag sign quickly became an identifying landmark for the city, and it was designated a Portland landmark by the city's Historic Landmarks Commission in 1977. Its lettering was changed to advertise the Made in Oregon gift retailer in 1997, and in 2010 the sign was acquired by the city and its lettering changed again, to read "Portland Oregon".

In 1966, White Stag was purchased by the Warner Brothers Company, which later became the Warnaco Group. The company moved its operations out of its downtown Portland building in 1973 and by 1987, had moved out of Portland completely.

In 1983, the company was doing $70 million in sales annually, out of Warnaco's overall annual sales of around $500 million. In fall 1986, White Stag had around 200 employees, and its facilities included a three-building complex occupying 14 acres (5.7 ha) on S.E. Harney Drive in Southeast Portland. Warnaco's move out of Portland was forecast for completion in 1987.

== The Warnaco years ==
In 1986, former Warnaco executive Linda J. Wachner engineered a $550 million hostile takeover of Warnaco and began streamlining the company. White Stag was reorganized with other activewear lines, including Speedo, into a new company, Authentic Fitness Corporation, which went public in 1992. The company grew through the 1990s, but saddled with debt from other acquisitions and mergers, Warnaco filed for Chapter 11 protection in 2000.

== Walmart label ==
After Warnaco emerged from bankruptcy in 2003, it sold the White Stag trademark to Walmart. For a time Walmart used the trademark on a line of women's casual clothing, footwear, and basic jewelry.
