= Central Building (Seattle) =

Building in Seattle, Washington, U.S.

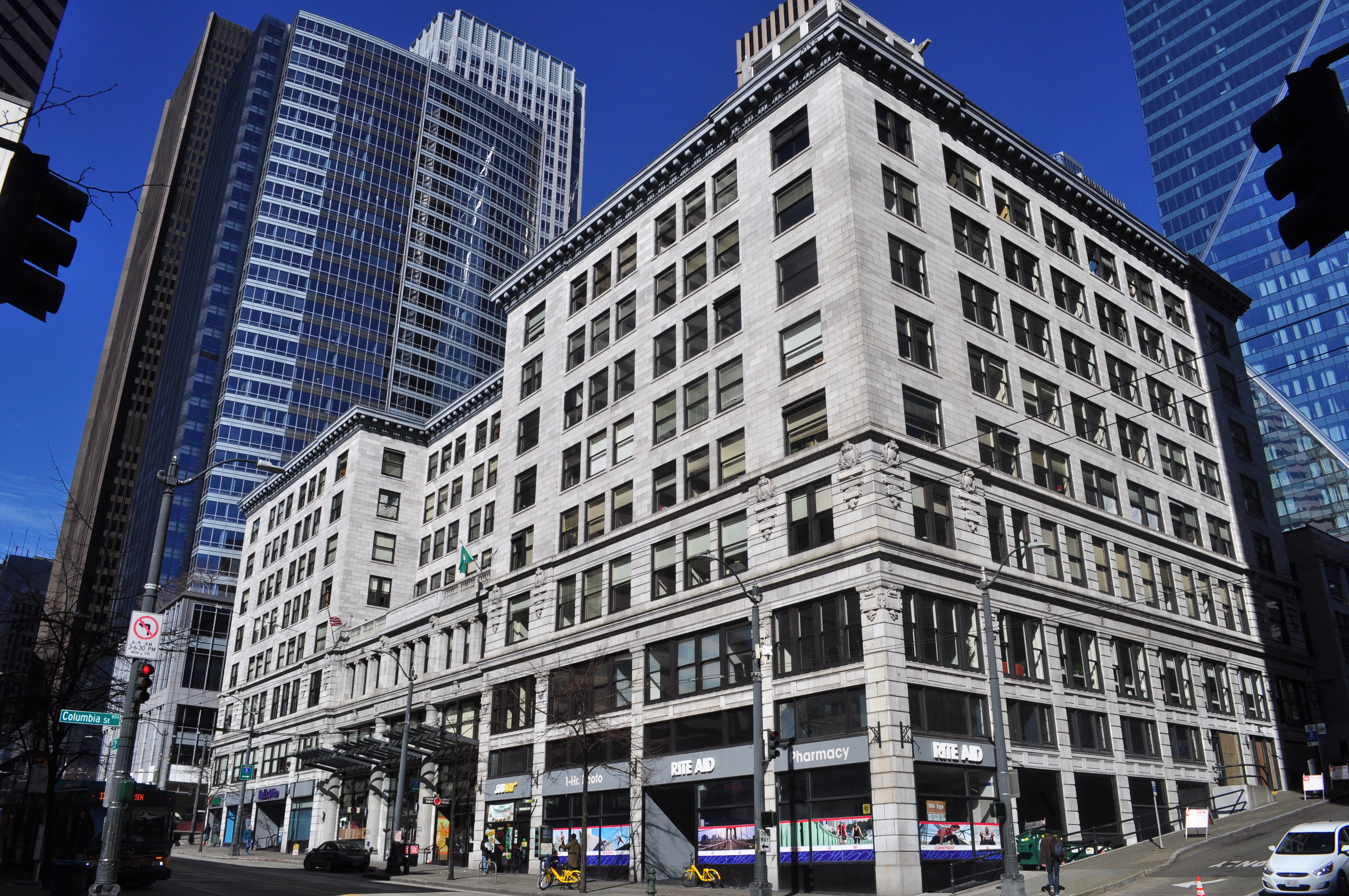
- The building's exterior, 2018
- Interactive map of the Central Building area

General information
- Coordinates: 47°36′17″N 122°19′58″W

Design and construction
- Architect: Charles Ronald Aldrich

Seattle Landmark
- Designated: May 7, 2008

The Central Building is a historic building at 810 3rd Avenue in downtown Seattle, in the U.S. state of Washington.

== Design ==
Charles Ronald Aldrich designed the building following the 1906 San Francisco earthquake. It has a facade apparently made of granite, but the structure is actually terra cotta.

== History ==
The building was completed in 1907 and renovated between 2002 and 2007. It sold for $67.5 million in 2018.

The building held the first meetings of the Port of Seattle commission in 1911. It was designated as a city landmark by the Seattle Landmarks Preservation Board in 2008.

== See also ==
- List of Seattle landmarks
