= Made in Oregon (brand) =

Retailer of gifts based in Oregon, USA

Made In Oregon

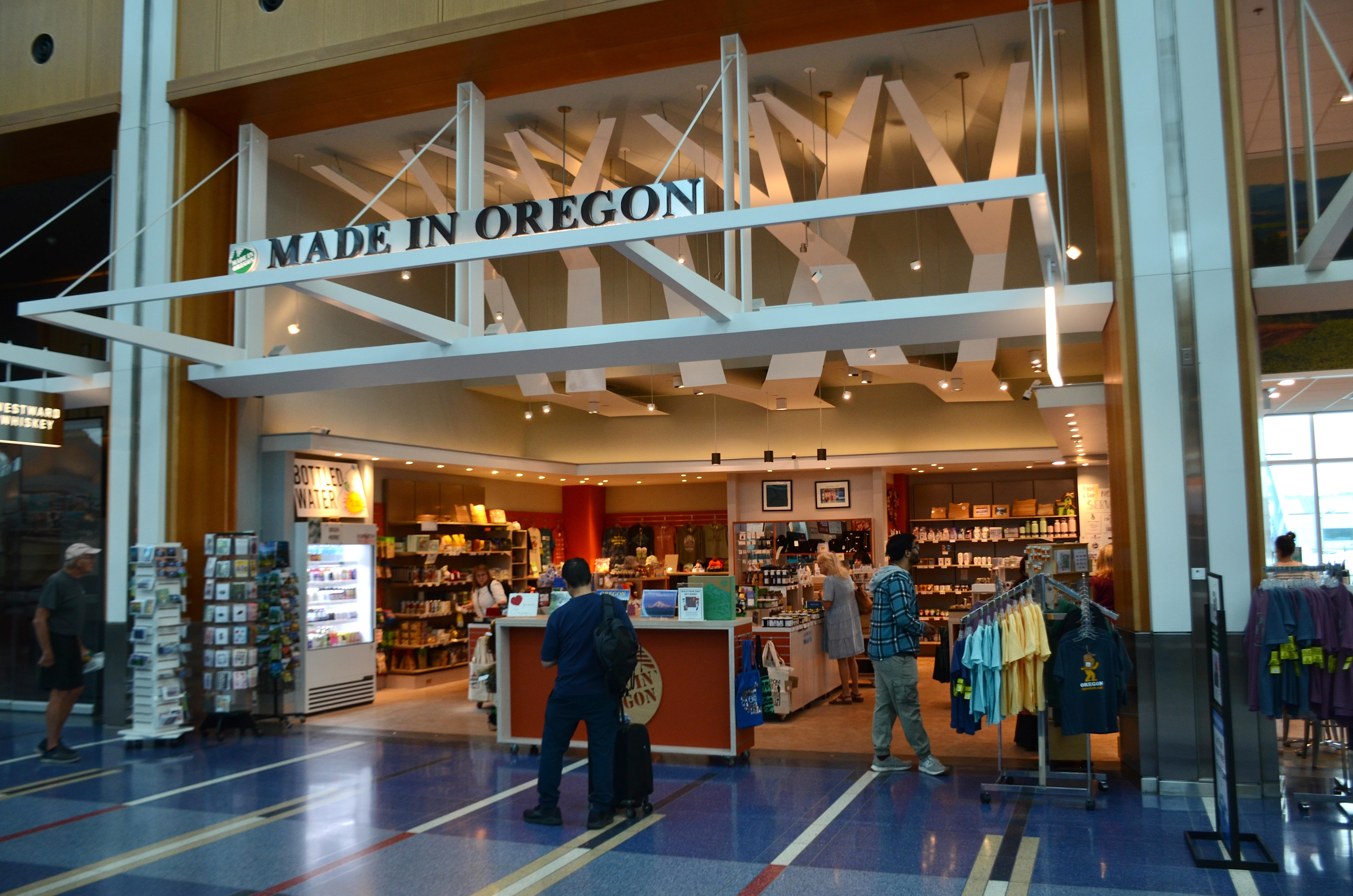
- A small Made in Oregon store at Portland International Airport
- Product type: Retail gifts
- Current owner: Naito Corporation
- Country: United States
- Introduced: 1975; 51 years ago
- Website: madeinoregon.com

Made in Oregon is an American brand and retail chain, established in 1975 and owned by Portland, Oregon-based Naito Corporation, in the United States. Now owned by Portland businessman Sam Naito, Naito Corporation was previously named H. Naito Corporation and until 1992 Norcrest China Company. The company was owned by Sam Naito and his brother, Bill Naito, until the latter's death in 1996. The chain of stores, which later expanded into mail-order and online retailing, specializes in Oregon-made products. The first Made in Oregon store opened in 1975 at Portland International Airport.

== History ==
Norcrest China Company was founded in Portland, Oregon, in 1958 by Hide Naito, who had emigrated from Japan in 1912. After Hide Naito's death in 1989, it was owned by his sons, Portland businessmen Bill Naito and his brother Sam, who together had already held a controlling share of the company stock since 1980. Norcrest China opened the first Made in Oregon store in 1975 in an 812-square-foot (75.4 m^{2}) space at Portland International Airport. The store was one of the first retailers in what became the Oregon Market inside the airport. The idea of offering products from one state was then a novelty; now the concept has been often copied. The chain had expanded to 11 stores by 1989 and had stores in 12 locations in 1998.

As of 2025, Made in Oregon has seven retail locations, including one in Portland International Airport, two elsewhere in the Portland metropolitan area, and one each in Eugene, Salem, Newport, and Woodburn. Products sold under the Made in Oregon brand include food, clothing, jewelry, and arts and crafts.

== "Made in Oregon" sign ==
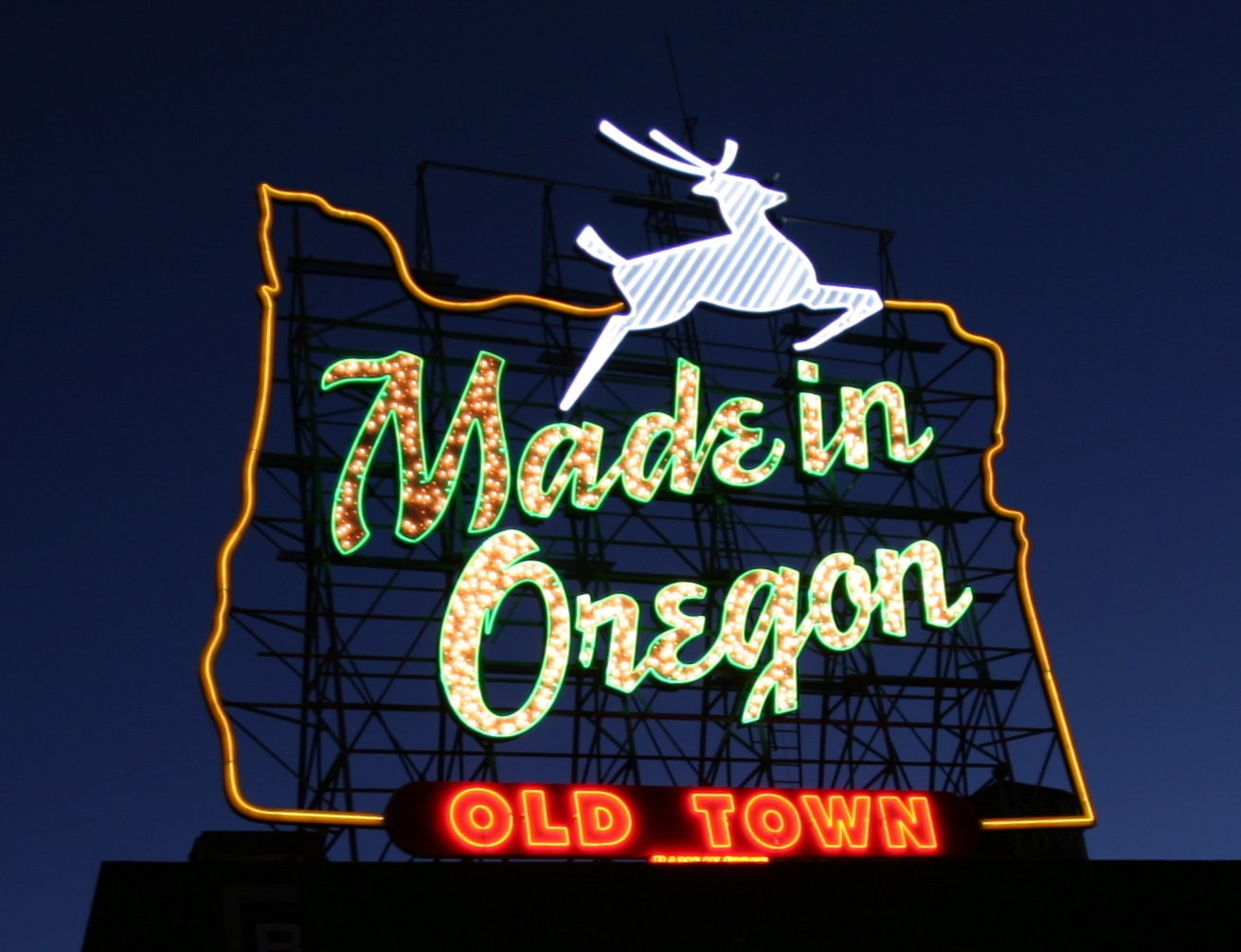
The former "Made in Oregon" sign in Portland

From 1997 until 2010, a lighted neon-and-bulb sign located atop the White Stag Building at 70 NW Couch Street in downtown Portland, facing the Burnside Bridge, advertised the Made in Oregon chain. In place since the 1940s, the sign is one of the identifying landmarks of Portland and was designated a City of Portland Historic Landmark in 1977. During the Christmas season, the nose of the deer glows red in imitation of Rudolph the Red-Nosed Reindeer. The sign was leased from Ramsay Signs by Made in Oregon owner H. Naito Corp. (formerly Norcrest China Co.). In 1996, Bob Naito, then vice president of H. Naito Corp., said the company had offered to buy the sign, but that Ramsay Signs was "unwilling to sell it."

In September 2010, ownership of the sign passed from Ramsay to the City of Portland, and in November the wording was changed from "Made in Oregon" to "Portland Oregon".
