= Rhodes Brothers =

Rhodes Brothers Co.
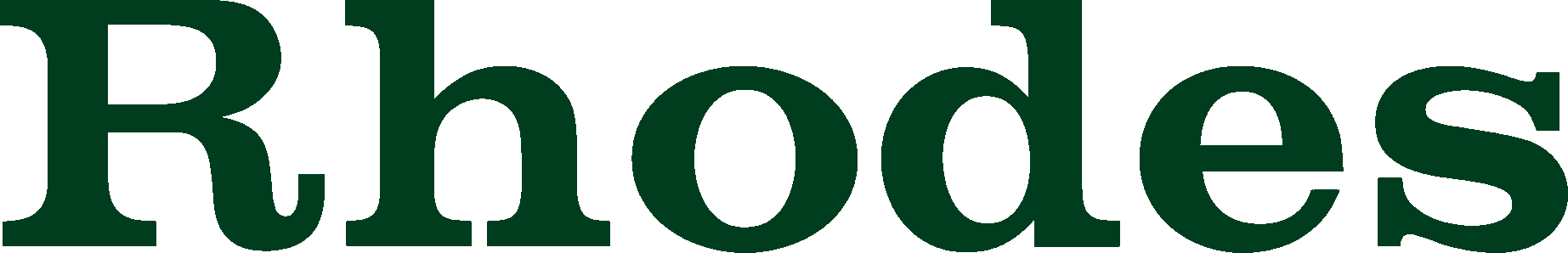
- Company type: Department store
- Industry: Retail
- Founded: 1903 Tacoma, Washington
- Defunct: 1969
- Fate: acquired by Liberty House
- Products: Clothing, footwear, bedding, furniture, jewelry, beauty products, and housewares.

Rhodes Brothers was a department store located in Tacoma, Washington, originally established in 1892 as a coffee shop in downtown Tacoma by Albert, William, Henry and Charles Rhodes. In 1903, the brothers would shift into the department store business, opening in the newly built Snell Building at Broadway and 11th Street in the heart of Tacoma's retail core. The store achieved great success, and by 1911, three floors were added to the building, eventually bringing it to 170,000 ft² (15793.52m²), including a tea room (opened in 1908) and a branch of the Tacoma Public Library. By 1920, even more room was needed and several buildings across the alley (Court C) were purchased and connected to the main store by a sky bridge. Further additions included a discount annex in 1935, a new men's shop in 1937 and a special vault that could hold 5,000 coats. In 1957, the company opened its first suburban location at the Villa Plaza Shopping Center in Lakewood, Washington. Rhodes also operated a department store in University Village in Seattle in the 1960s. At one time there were signs on highways in Washington that said, "All roads lead to Rhodes," giving the number of miles to the Rhodes store in Tacoma.

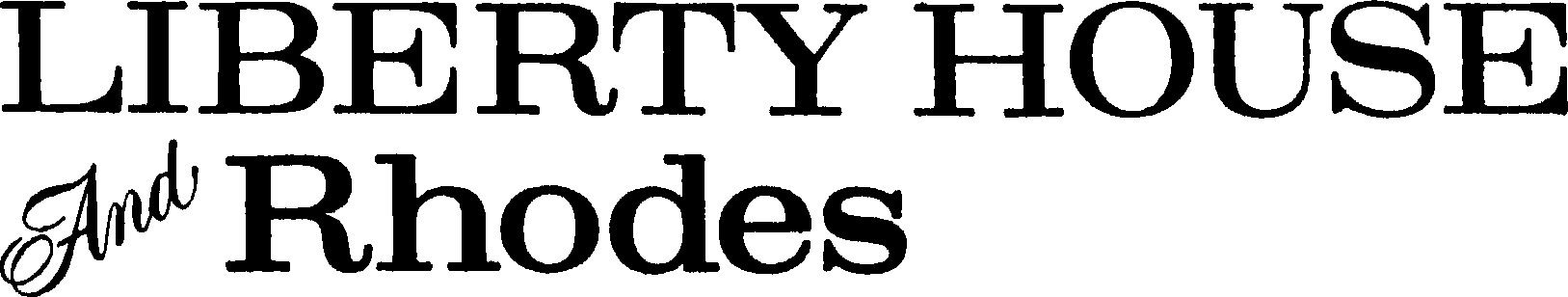
Liberty House purchased Rhodes. This was the transition logo used before the Rhodes name was phased out

In the early 1950s, Rhodes was acquired by Western Department Stores, Inc., which also owned Kahn's of Oakland, California, and Olds & King of Portland. Western took on the Rhodes name, becoming Rhodes Western, and by 1960 all stores were brought under the Rhodes name. In 1969, Rhodes Western was acquired by Amfac which owned the Liberty House chain of department stores and took on that name. Liberty House opened a location in Tacoma Mall in 1973, where Rhodes Western had been considering opening a location before they were bought out. The downtown Tacoma Rhodes store was closed in December 1974, and the Lakewood and Tacoma Mall locations were sold to Frederick & Nelson in 1979. Threatened with demolition, the downtown Tacoma location was bought and renovated by the University of Puget Sound in 1978 for use as a law school. After the building was vacated by the University of Puget Sound in 1999, it was purchased by the State of Washington and was renovated further in 2001. Now known as the Rhodes Center, the building is mostly vacant today, housing rentable conference space, several state offices and a law firm.

== Rhodes Seattle ==
Albert Rhodes left Rhodes Brothers in 1907 and moved to Seattle, where he established the Rhodes Department Store. By 1926, it anchored the corner of Second Avenue and Union Streets in the downtown retail core. The store, which by then had several suburban branches, was purchased in 1968 by the Pay 'n Save corporation, who promptly shuttered its downtown store and re-branded the rest under a newly created moniker: Lamonts. (See the Seattle Department of Neighborhoods web site, Seattle.gov, and its information on the Albert J. Rhodes mansion, designed by Ambrose J. Russell and Frederick Heath (architect).)
