= White stag =

White-colored deer that frequently appears in many different mythologies

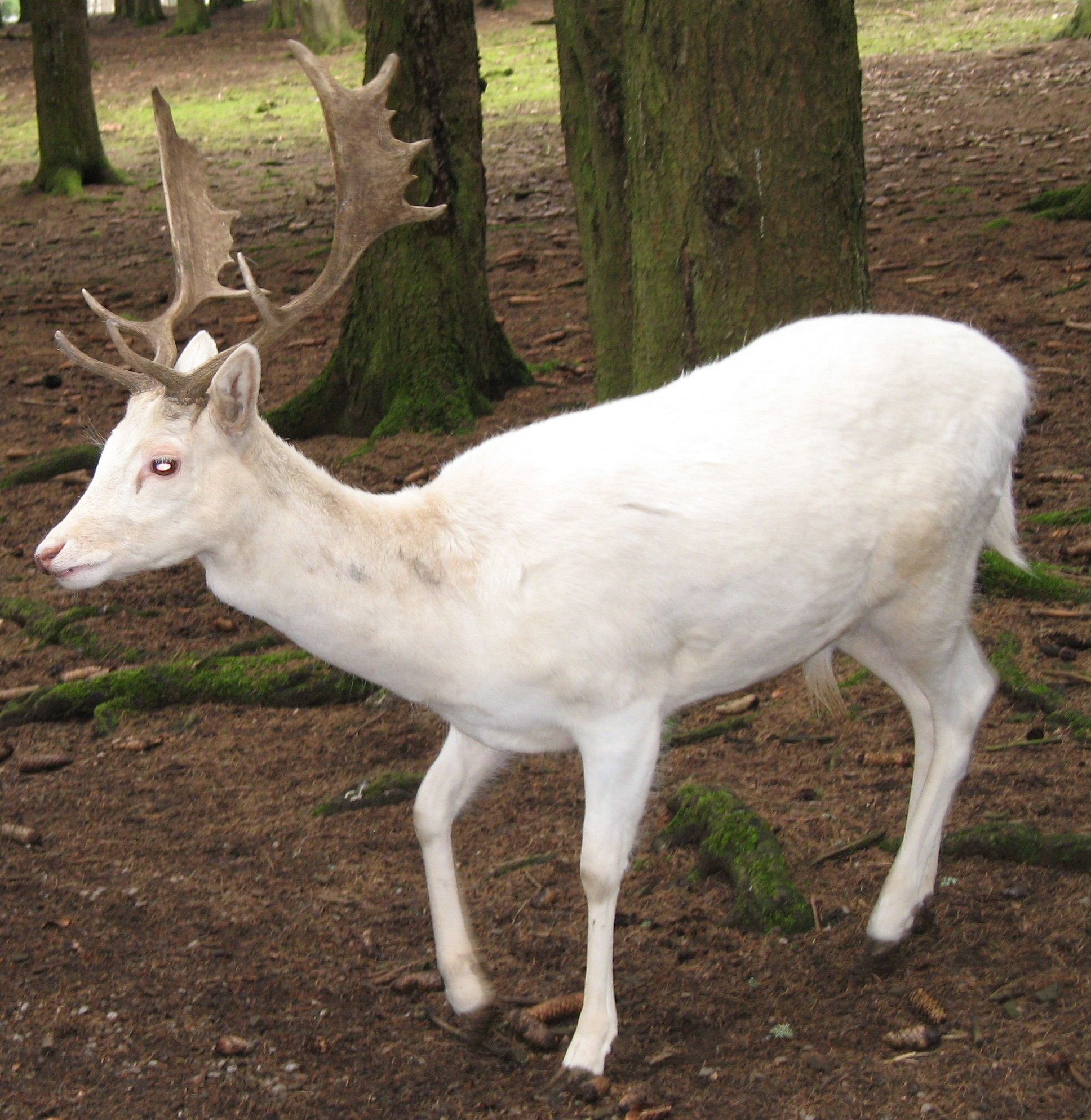
A white fallow deer (Dama dama) stag in Hellenthal, Germany

A white stag (or white hind for the female) is a white-colored red deer, elk, sika deer, chital, reindeer, or moose. A white deer from species such as fallow deer, roe deer, white-tailed deer, black-tailed deer, or rusa, is instead referred to as a “white buck” or “white doe”. The all-white coloration is the result of leucism, a condition that causes hair and skin to lose its natural pigmentation. The white deer has played a prominent role in the mythology of many cultures.

== Biology ==
Leucism is a rare genetic pattern that causes a reduction in the pigment of an animal's hair and skin. The natural colour of the red deer ranges from dark red to brown. They are often thought to be albinos; however, unlike albinos, who have characteristically red eyes, deer with leucism have normal colouring in their eyes. It is distinguished biologically from albinism in that it causes a reduced pigmentation in all skin types, and not just melanin. There is also a black color morph of the white-tailed deer which exhibits melanism. While rare in their natural distribution, there is an incidence of up to 8.5% occurrence of black deer in certain regions of central Texas.

== Symbolism ==
=== Folklore ===
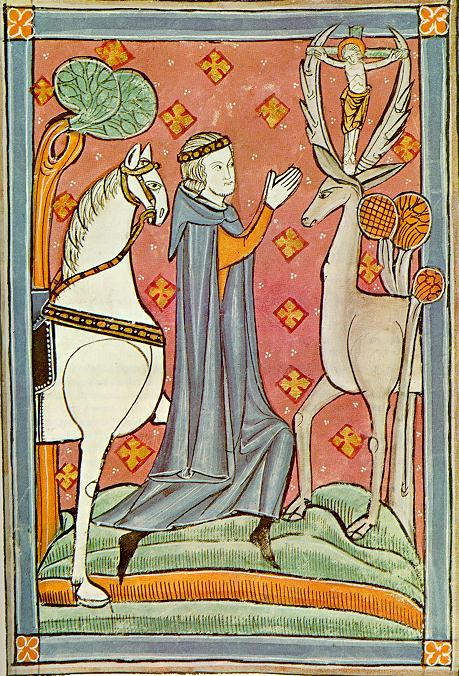
13th-century English illuminated manuscript depicting St Eustace and the white hart

White deer hold a place in the traditions of many cultures. They are considered to be messengers from the otherworld in some Celtic mythology; they also played an important role in other pre-Indo-European cultures, especially in the north. The Celts believed that the white stag would appear when one was transgressing a taboo, such as when Pwyll trespassed into Arawn's hunting grounds. In English folklore, the white hart is associated with Herne the Hunter.

Arthurian legend states that the creature has a perennial ability to evade capture, and that the pursuit of the animal represents mankind's spiritual quest. It also signalled that the time was high for the knights of the kingdom to pursue a quest.

In Catholicism and Eastern Orthodox, the white stag was partly responsible for the conversion of the martyr Saint Eustace. Eustace saw a vision of Christ between the stag's antlers and was told that he would suffer for Christ. A similar legend is associated with Saint Hubert.

White Hart Badge of Richard II

The White Hart was the badge of King Richard II of England, who probably derived it from the arms of his mother, Joan "The Fair Maid of Kent", heiress of Edmund of Woodstock. It may also have been a pun on his name, as in "Rich-hart". Richard's White Hart is recumbent and wears a gold crown as a collar, attached to a long gold chain, symbolising both the suffering of Christ and Richard's burden of kingship, both noble and enslaved. It associated Richard's rule with piety and asserted his divine authority. The emblem features prominently in a notable piece of late 14th-century religious art known as Wilton Diptych (National Gallery, London), which is thought to be the earliest authentic contemporary portrait of an English king; in the diptych paintings, Richard II is depicted wearing a gold and enamelled White Hart jewel, and even the angels surrounding the Virgin Mary all wear White Hart badges. On one of the reverse panels, there is a White Hart seated on a bed of rosemary, symbolising remembrance and sorrow.

The white stag has also been invoked in contemporary society for its symbolism. In 1909 Ezra Pound published a poem entitled "The White Stag" in his collection Personae. Robert Baden-Powell, founder of the Scouting movement, spoke to Scouts at the 1933 World Jamboree in Gödöllő, Hungary, about the white stag:

The White Stag has a message for you. Hunters of old pursued the miraculous stag, not because they expected to kill it, but because it led them in the joy of the chase to new and fresh adventures, and so to capture happiness. You may look on the White Stag as the true spirit of Scouting, springing forward and upward, ever leading you onward to leap over difficulties, to face new adventures in your active pursuit of the higher aims of Scouting.

— Baden-Powell's farewell speech to the Scouts

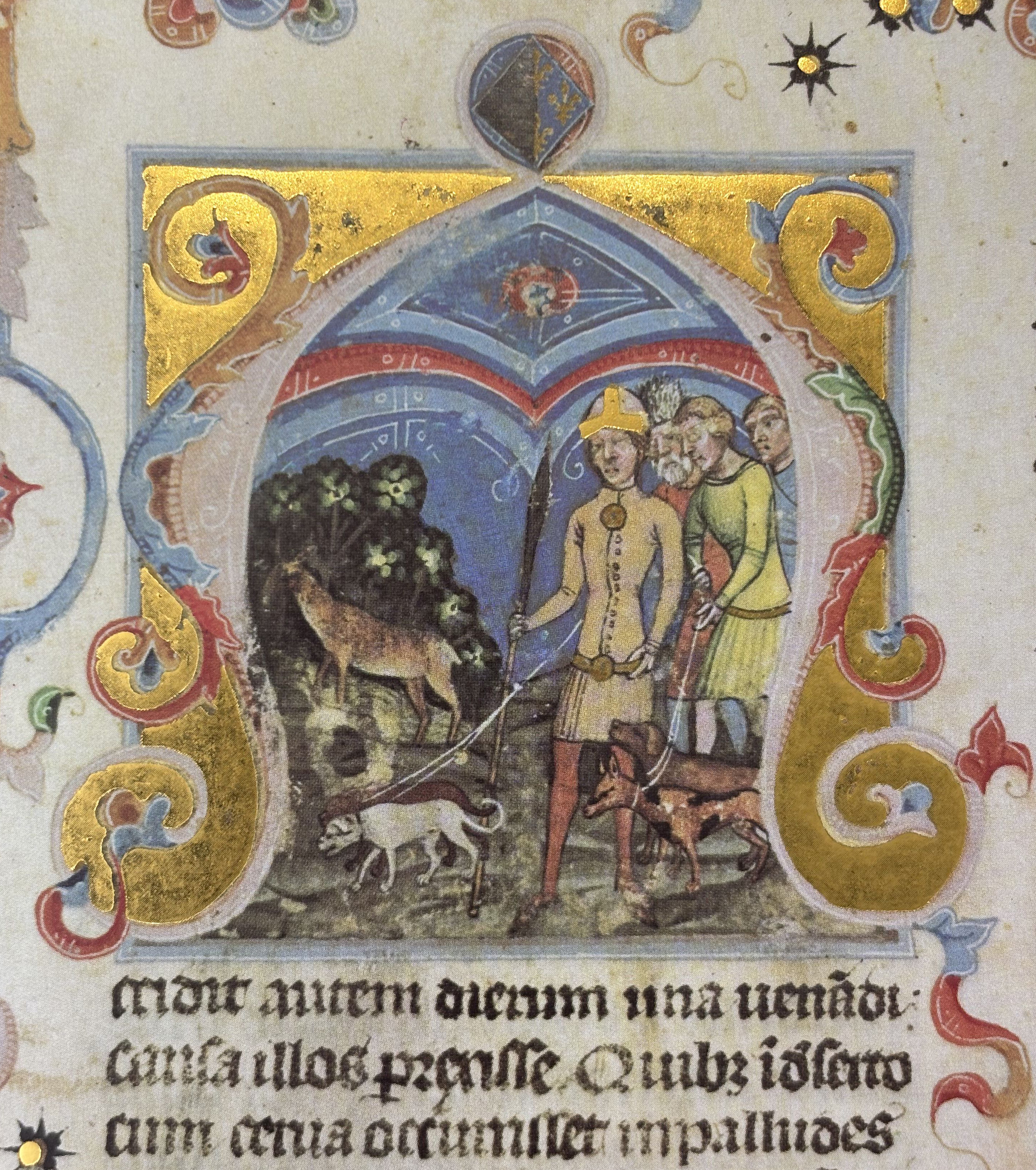
Miniature of the hunt of the White Stag, with Hunor and Magor in the foreground, 1360.

Today, the Hungarian branch of Scouts uses the white stag as a symbol. The white stag is also prevalent in Hungarian mythology; it was believed that a white stag led the brothers Hunor and Magor to Scythia, an action which preceded the formation of the Hun and Magyar people.

=== Reasons for symbolism ===
The colour white has long been associated with purity; and in Celtic culture, the colour also represented the otherworld. In modern society, people have acted to protect the white stag as a vestige of beauty, and the hunting of the white stag has often been met with anger, because of its rare and elusive nature.

For early man, the deer represented a valuable resource, providing nourishment, clothing and other accessories; and the deer may have played a role in totemic culture.

== See also ==
- White Hart
