= Pantages Theatre =

Pantages Theatre may refer to:

== United States ==
=== Los Angeles ===
- Arcade Theatre, Los Angeles's first Pantages Theatre
- Warner Bros. Downtown Theatre, Los Angeles's second Pantages Theatre
- Hollywood Pantages Theatre, Los Angeles's third and final Pantages Theatre

=== Other ===
- Pantages Theatre (Fresno, California), now Warnors Theatre
- Pantages Theatre (Minneapolis)
- Pantages Theatre (Salt Lake City), Utah
- Pantages Theater (Tacoma, Washington)

== Canada ==
- Pantages Theatre (Toronto), Ontario, now Ed Mirvish Theatre
- Pantages Theatre (Vancouver), British Columbia
- McPherson Playhouse, British Columbia, formerly Pantages Theater
- Pantages Playhouse Theatre, Manitoba
