= East Van VODville Cinema =

Free miniature cinema

The East Van Vodville Cinema (EVVC), also known as the "Little Free Cinema", is a free tiny movie theatre located in Vancouver, Canada. It is a scale model of a heritage theatre with a working video screen, tucked behind a façade in a plywood covered-window.

It shows an ever-changing lineup of curated short film clips, activated by the push of a button. It runs 24 hours a day, free of charge. The installation was created by local artists David Bynoe and Janet Mader in 2024. The EVVC is Located in the Commercial Drive area of the Grandview Woodlands neighbourhood in East Vancouver, and is mounted on the west wall of 1601 Venables Street, "four windows from the alley". The building is home to the Vancouver Hack Space. With a soft launch in June 2024 and a formal opening in November 2024, it received over 19,000 views in the first fifteen months of operation.

== Programming ==
Because of the EVVC's unusual, non-ergonomic, weather-exposed setup, each film clip is limited to 3–5 minutes maximum duration. Content includes works by local independent filmmakers, and short clips from longer media, per the Fair dealing exemption under Canadian copyright law.

== Inspiration ==
The EVVC draws inspiration from numerous sources, including the Peephole Cinema in San Francisco, earlier guerilla artworks at the Vancouver Hack Space, and the artists' desire to re-purpose some electronic real-estate brochure e-waste. A great deal of the knowledge, electronic hardware support and fabrication tool capability bringing the project to life came from Vancouver Hack Space, the hackerspace that hosts the EVVC. The inspiration for the miniature auditorium is the historic Vancouver First Pantages Theatre, which operated at Main and Hastings in Vancouver from 1907 to 1994, and was demolished in 2011 despite an extensive public campaign to save it. It was a major stop on the vaudeville circuit, playing host to live comedy and dance shows into the 1940s and 50s. In the 1920s, a cinema screen was added.

While the "VOD" portion of the "Vodville" name reminds younger viewers of modern video on demand services, the spelling is also a nod to history; early photos of the Pantages marquee suggest the use of the spelling "VODVIL PICTURES", which Bynoe speculates was a way to save money on costly electric lettering.

== Technical specifications ==
The EVVC is powered by a Raspberry Pi video player. Construction was a mixture of 3-D printed and hand-building modelmaking techniques. The model's scale is 1:55. To accommodate younger viewers and those with mobility issues, steps, a handrail, and concrete pavers were added in response to community feedback.
