= Sovereign Hotel =

Sovereign Hotel may refer to:

- Sovereign Hotel (California), in Santa Monica, California, listed on the U.S. National Register of Historic Places (NRHP)
- Sovereign Hotel (Oregon), in Portland, Oregon, also listed on the NRHP
