= Gus Farney =

American theatre organist and music teacher

- Born: Francis Stillmen Farney; October 9, 1901; Chicago, Illinois, U.S.
- Died: April 17, 1964 (aged 62) Salt Lake City, Utah, U.S.
- Occupations: Theatre organist; music teacher; pianist
- Years active: 1922–1964

Francis Stillmen "Gus" Farney (October 9, 1901 – April 17, 1964) was an American theatre organist, pianist, and music teacher based in Salt Lake City, Utah. He was active as a professional organist for over four decades and became closely associated with Larry Bray's Organ Loft in South Salt Lake.

== Biography ==
Farney was born on October 9, 1901, in Chicago, Illinois, the son of Bernard T. and Della Farney. He began piano study at the age of five and was a graduate of West High School in Salt Lake City, where he was the intermountain states' 220-yard dash champion.

During his high school years he toured as a professional pianist. In 1922 he began accompanying silent films on organ for Pantages and Fox theatres across several western states, following study under John McClellan, a former organist for the Mormon Tabernacle Choir, and J. R. Wayne of Los Angeles.

He later undertook two additional years of study in Denver under Franz Rath Jr., a protégé of Henry Murtaugh, at the Isis Theatre Hope-Jones organ.

From late 1927 through early 1934, Farney served as a feature organist for the Publix Corporation of Paramount, performing in Colorado, Nebraska, and Texas until the widespread decline of the theatre organ with the advent of sound film. He subsequently worked as a featured soloist for the Hammond and Baldwin organ companies, operated his own music school, and performed for many years at Salt Lake City churches and club benefit programs. He was also a member of the Max Engman Band.

During World War II Farney served as a civilian flight instructor at Thunderbird Field in Arizona. A licensed pilot for nearly three decades and a former CAA Flight Examiner, he was billed professionally as "The Flying Organist."

On July 26, 1943, he married Alice Jeanett Jorgenson in Salt Lake City.

In 1949 Farney became the feature organist at Larry Bray's Organ Loft, a private venue at 3331 Edison Street, South Salt Lake, housing a five-manual Wurlitzer pipe organ. He remained there until his death, recording several albums for Warner Bros. Records at the venue.

Farney died of a heart ailment on April 17, 1964, at his home at 776 E. 21st South, Salt Lake City, at the age of 62. He was survived by his widow, a stepson and stepdaughter, and seven grandchildren.

== Discography ==
All albums recorded at the Bray Organ Loft, Salt Lake City, Utah, on the five-manual Wurlitzer.

- Colossus: Gus Farney at the Giant Wurlitzer (Warner Bros. Records, WS 1359, 1960)
- Gus Farney at the Giant 5 Manual Wurlitzer Organ (Warner Bros. Records, W/WS 1409, 1961)
- Giant Pipes (Warner Bros. Records, B 1433, 1962)
