= Arcade Theatre =

Former movie theater in Los Angeles, California

- U.S. Historic district – Contributing property
- Los Angeles Historic-Cultural Monument
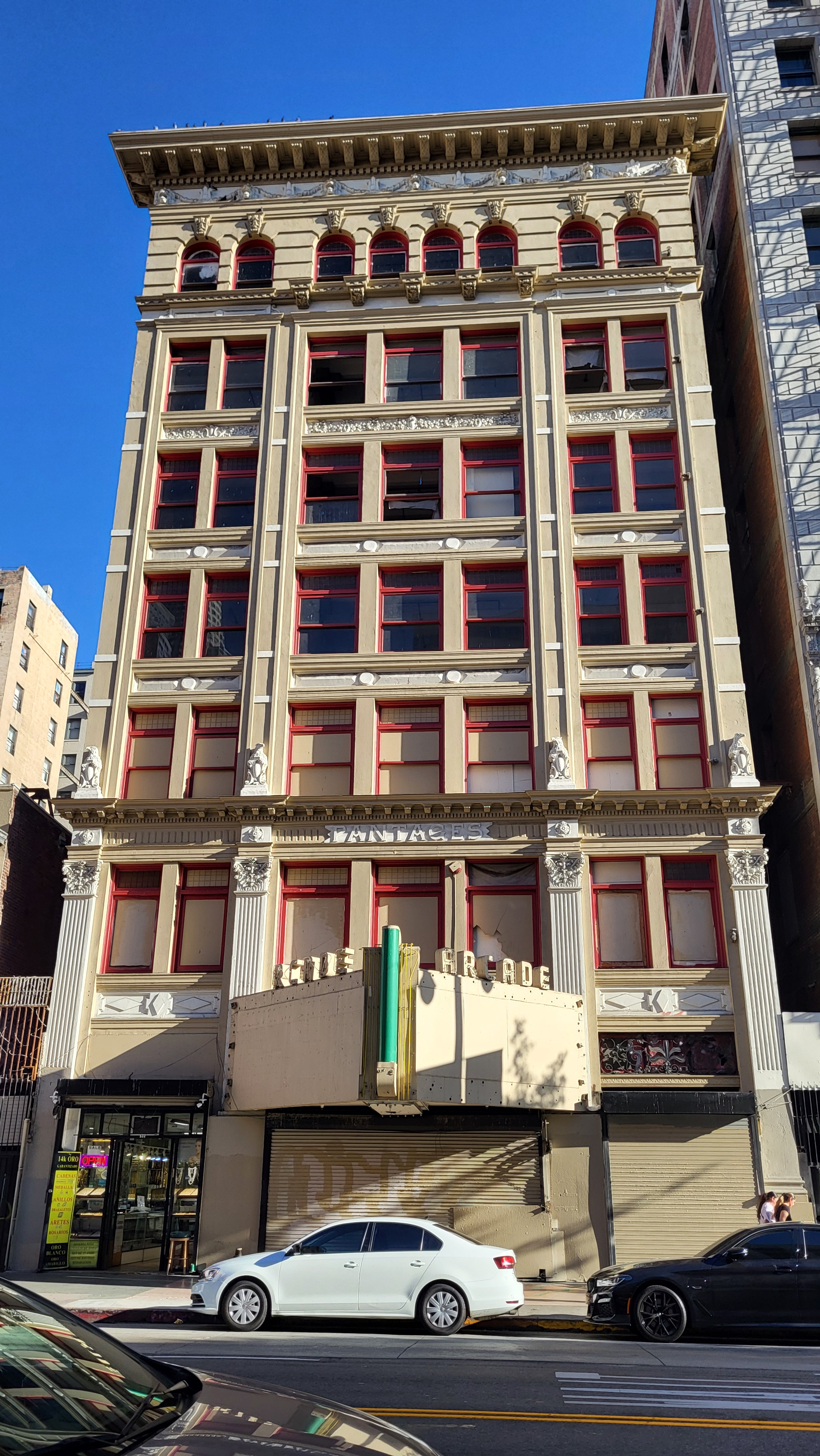
- The building in 2025

- Location within the Los Angeles metropolitan area
- Location: 534 S. Broadway, Los Angeles, California
- Coordinates: 34.04737°N 118.2506°W
- Built: 1910
- Architect: Morgan and Walls
- Architectural style: Beaux Arts
- Part of: Broadway Theater and Commercial District (ID79000484)
- LAHCM No.: 525

Significant dates
- Designated CP: May 9, 1979
- Designated LAHCM: March 20, 1991

The Arcade Theatre is a historic former vaudeville and movie theater in the Broadway district of Los Angeles, California. Commissioned by real estate developer William May Garland in 1910, it originally operated under the direction of Alexander Pantages. In 1920, the Pantages operation moved to a new auditorium on 7th Street; thereafter, the theater became known as Dalton's Broadway for two years before ultimately taking the Arcade name in 1924 in association with the adjacent Broadway-Spring Arcade building. Metropolitan Theatres later operated the facility as a grindhouse until its closure in 1992.

Los Angeles architectural firm Morgan and Walls designed the building in the Beaux-Arts style. The seven-story building includes office space on its upper floors. The Arcade neighbors the former Cameo and Roxie movie theaters. The city of Los Angeles designated the Arcade Theatre a Historic-Cultural Monument in 1991.

== History ==
Los Angeles real estate developer William May Garland commissioned a new office building and theater in 1909; although most theaters at the time were located on Main Street, he chose a site on Broadway, making it an early part of the eventual theater district there. Local architects Morgan and Walls drafted plans for the structure in November 1909.

On New Year's Day 1910, the Los Angeles Times reported that construction was ready to commence with an expected $150,000 cost and a 15-year, $400,000 lease agreement signed by vaudeville impresario Alexander Pantages. Work began on the building in March.

The Pantages Theatre opened on September 26, 1910, the 33rd facility to be added to the Pantages vaudeville circuit. Two full-capacity audiences gave positive reviews for a composite show that featured "The Yalto duo, whirlwind dancers; Maurice Burkhart, singing comedian and impersonator; Lelliott Brothers, woh [sic] present an interesting instrumental act; MacLean and Bryant in a clever little dramatic sketch called '17-20 in the Black;' Sophie Tucker, coon shouter, and Barnold's dog and monkey actors, one of the most interesting animal acts seen in Los Angeles in many days." A. J. Louis purchased the first ticket and later presented it to Pantages as a memento. Pantages circuit veteran J. O. Chaney served as the inaugural stage manager.

In 1915, the theater installed an electric scoreboard to provide updates on the World Series between the Boston Red Sox and Philadelphia Phillies during matinee hours.

In August 1920, Alexander Pantages opened a new Pantages Theatre on 7th Street, keeping the original Broadway venue open until December 1921 when it temporarily closed for a photoplayer installation. Afterwards, the facility opened under new management as Dalton's Broadway Theatre. In 1924, officials renamed the building the Arcade Theatre following the newly-constructed Spring Arcade next door.

Following a $100,000 renovation designed by architect Oscar N. Land that featured "every new feature of theater construction available", the Arcade Theatre reopened on April 30, 1927, with a showing of the Dorothy Davenport film The Red Kimono. The theater reopened under the management of Principal Theaters Corporation.

On July 30, 1932, the Dalton brothers reopened the Arcade Theatre as a burlesque house advertised as having "youth and beauty, massive scenic settings, elaborate costuming, a cycle of spectacular chorus song and dance numbers".

With the rise in popularity of news cinemas at the time, the Arcade Theatre operated as the Telenews Theatre from August to November 1941. It later operated as the Teleview Theatre, another operation that ceased in favor of regular movie programming.

The Arcade's final operator, Metropolitan Theatres, ran it as a grindhouse. On March 20, 1991, the city of Los Angeles designated the building a Historic-Cultural Monument, along with the neighboring Cameo and Roxie theaters. In 1992, Metropolitan closed the Arcade Theatre. It has since been converted to retail use in the lobby space; the auditorium remains intact and unused.

== Architecture ==
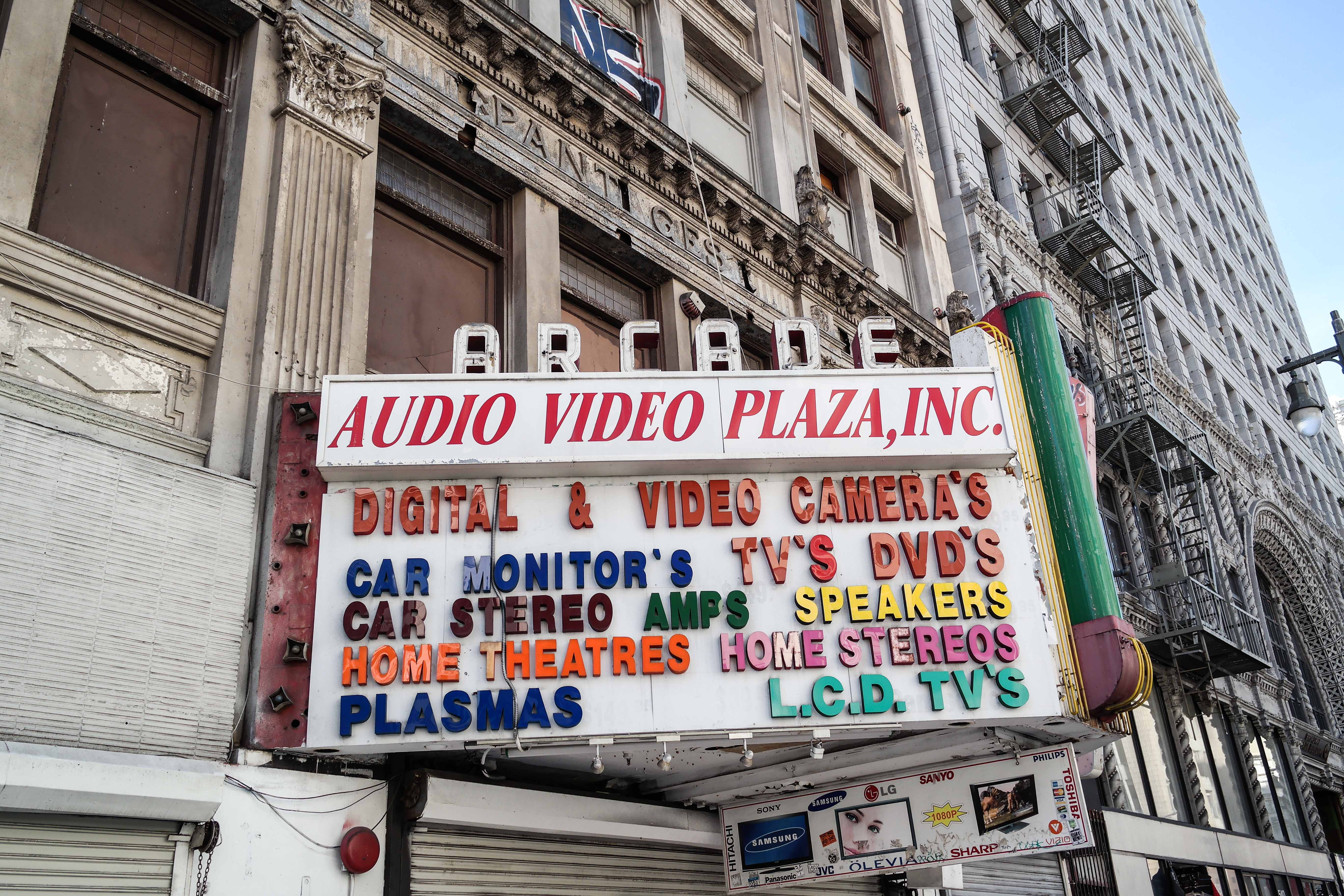
The marquee in 2014

Morgan and Walls designed the Arcade Theatre in the Beaux-Arts style, specifically designed to imitate the look and feel of an English music hall. The stonework on the facade still bears the original venue name, Pantages. The inaugural auditorium configuration sat 1,400 people between the orchestra, balcony, gallery, and box sections. The original setting featured a mural above the proscenium arch until it was painted over.

S. Charles Lee designed renovations that took place between 1937 and 1938 that included a new marquee, modernized lobby, and the removal of the box seating. At this time, theater officials decided to close the upper gallery section due to poor sightlines, reducing capacity to 800.

== See also ==
- List of Los Angeles Historic-Cultural Monuments in Downtown Los Angeles
- List of contributing properties in the Broadway Theater and Commercial District
