= Wilshire Theatre =

Former movie theater in Santa Monica, California, United States

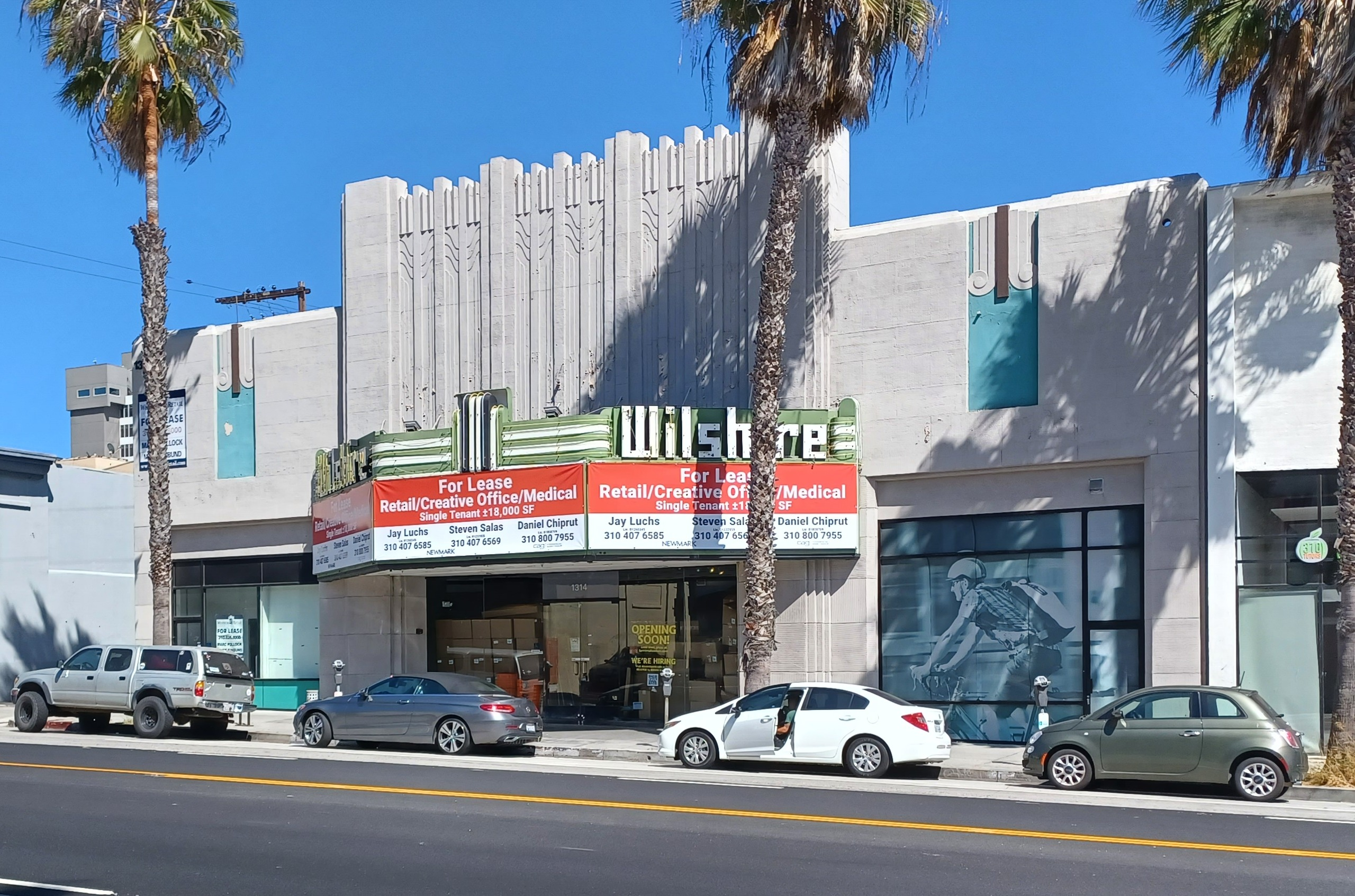
- The building in 2023
- Interactive map of Wilshire Theatre
- Address: 1314-1316 Wilshire Boulevard; Santa Monica
- Coordinates: 34.0262°N 118.4892°W
- Capacity: 1,500 originally
- Type: Movie theater

Construction
- Built: 1930
- Opened: 1931
- Renovated: 1960, 1977
- Closed: 2007
- Architect: John M. Cooper

Santa Monica Historic Landmark
- Designated: January 14, 2008
- Reference no.: 81

Wilshire Theatre, also known as NuWilshire Theatre, was a movie theater located at 1314-1316 Wilshire Boulevard in Santa Monica, California.

== History ==
Wilshire Theatre was designed for Harry H. Belden by John M. Cooper, the architect also known for downtown Los Angeles's Roxie Theatre. The theater was built in 1930, opened in 1931, and was purchased by Fox West Coast Theatres shortly after opening.

The theater was remodeled in 1960 and again 1977, the latter of which divided the theater's single screen into two. Mann Theatres performed the second remodel shortly after purchasing the theater.

Landmark Theatres purchased the theater in 1992, at which point they renamed it NuWilshire Theatre.

Wilshire Theater closed in November 2007 and was designated Santa Monica Historic Landmark #81 on January 14, 2008.

== Architecture and design ==
Wilshire Theater is rectangular in plan and made of concrete with a stucco façade. The building was designed in the Art Deco style and features a balanced and hierarchical façade, three bays with a high parapet over the central bay, wide and stepped pilasters that create verticality and divide the outside bays, additional smaller pilasters that divide the front façade, recessed panels, decorative patterns including chevrons and stepped scrolls, a marquee, and two neon signs that spell out 'Wilshire' on top of the marquee. The building also features storefronts on each side of the theater entrance.

The original marquee was replaced and three arched windows above the marquee were enclosed during the 1960 remodel. Also replaced during the remodel were the free-standing central ticket kiosk with ticket booths and the original tile floor with terrazzo flooring.

The theater's entrance features a recessed foyer, multi-colored terrazzo floor with an inlayed chevron pattern, several display cases, and aluminum and glass doors.

Integrity of the building is considered high.
