= Hollywood Knickerbocker Hotel =

1929 building used as a retirement home

- U.S. Historic district – Contributing property
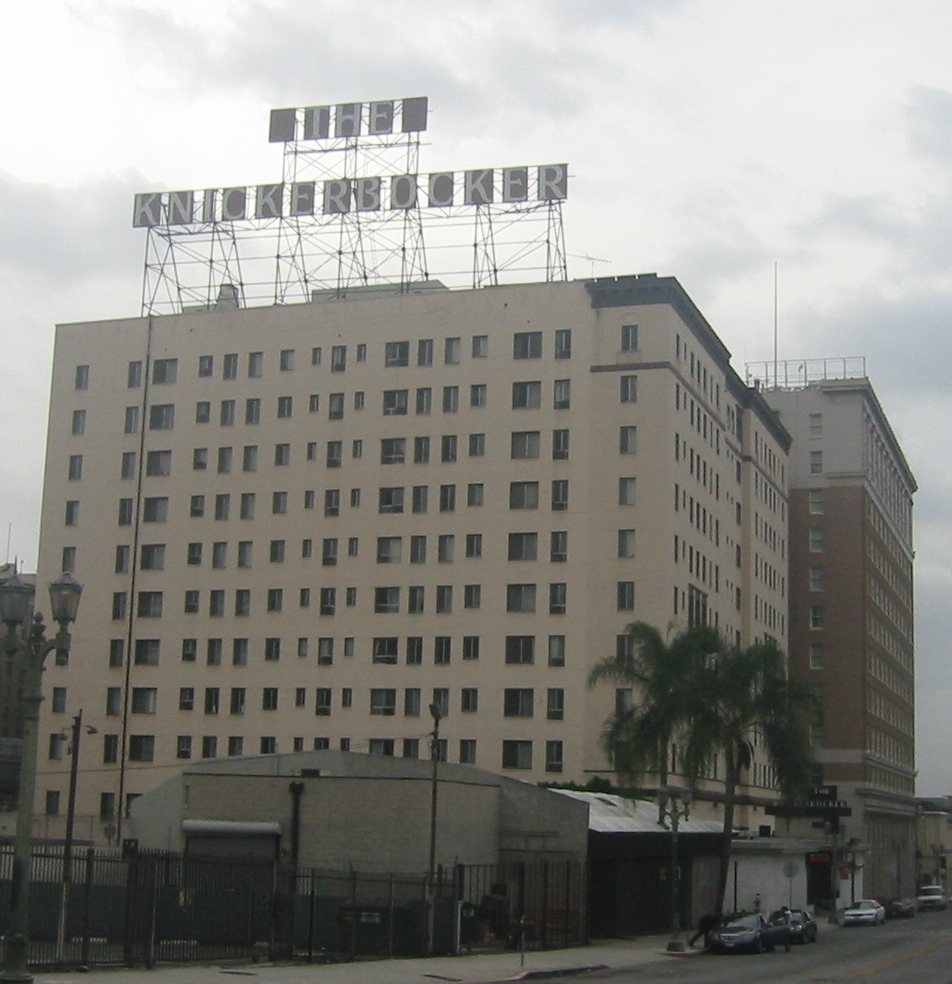
- Knickerbocker in 2006

- Location within the Los Angeles metropolitan area
- Location: 1714 Ivar Avenue, Hollywood, California
- Coordinates: 34°06′09″N 118°19′40″W
- Built: 1925 or 1929
- Architect: John M. Cooper and/or E. M. Frasier
- Architectural style: Spanish Colonial and/or Renaissance Revival/Beaux Arts
- Part of: Hollywood Boulevard Commercial and Entertainment District (ID85000704)
- Designated CP: April 4, 1985

Hollywood Knickerbocker Apartments, formerly Hollywood Knickerbocker Hotel, also known as the Knickerbocker, is a historic former apartment hotel, now retirement home, located at 1714 Ivar Avenue in Hollywood, California. The building is known for the many classic Hollywood celebrities who lived here, and in the 1940s, it was known as "the Hotel of the Stars" and "Home of the Famous".

== History ==
=== Beginnings ===
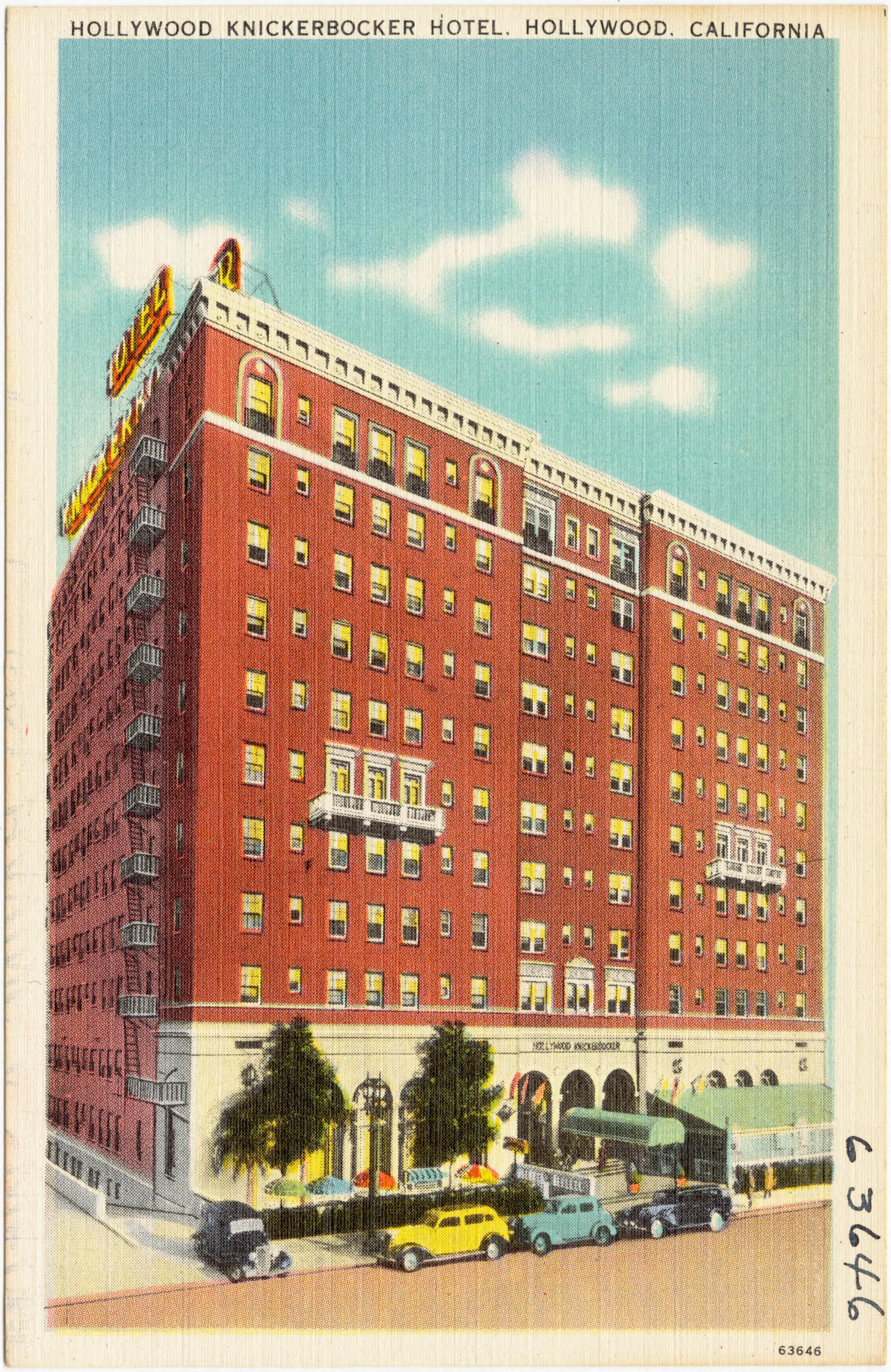
Postcard circa 1940s

Designed by John M. Cooper and/or E. M. Frasier, the Hollywood Chamber of Commerce cite the Knickerbocker as opening as a luxury apartment house in 1925 and then converting to a hotel, while the United States Department of the Interior cite the Knickerbocker as opening as a hotel 1929. The building was built for $1.5 million ($27.8 million in 2025) and originally featured 500 rooms and 200 suites.

=== Golden age ===
The Knickerbocker originally catered to the region's nascent film industry and as such it was frequented by several of the industry's biggest stars and was the site for some of the area's most famous moments. Rudolph Valentino was said to be a frequent guest, although that is only possible if the building opened in 1925 and not 1929, as Valentino died in 1926. In October 1935, Betty Grable hosted a costume party to celebrate Jackie Coogan's 21st birthday in the hotel, with Lucille Ball, Johnny Mercer, and one of the Dionne quintuplets in attendance. On Halloween 1936, in what would become a media sensation, Bess Houdini held her tenth and final séance to contact her dead husband on the hotel's roof.

On January 13, 1943, Frances Farmer was arrested at the hotel after failing to pay multiple DUI fines. Naked and refusing to cooperate, she was carried through the hotel kicking, spitting, screaming, and wrapped in a shower curtain. D. W. Griffith spent the last year of his life at the hotel, and according to the Los Angeles Times, he died on July 23, 1948, after being discovered unconscious in the hotel's lobby. However, Griffith may not have collapsed in the lobby at all, as other newspapers reported that Griffith had been "stricken inside his hotel room."

The hotel retained its glamor and notoriety through the 1950s. Marilyn Monroe and Joe DiMaggio often met at the hotel bar. On December 1, 1954, a camera crew from the NBC show This Is Your Life surprised retired comedy legends Stan Laurel and Oliver Hardy in room 205, something the duo did not appreciate. Elvis Presley stayed in room 1016 while making his first film, Love Me Tender. In 1962, celebrated costume designer Irene Lentz (known professionally by just her first name) committed suicide by jumping from an 11th-floor window.

On March 3, 1966, veteran character actor William Frawley was walking down Hollywood Boulevard when he suffered a heart attack. According to Bart Andrews, after Frawley had collapsed, a nurse had dragged him to the Knickerbocker where he died in the lobby. However, this may be apocryphal because there are no newspapers from 1966 that mention Frawley ever being taken to the Knickerbocker, which was located half a block up a hill from where he collapsed, and the Los Angeles Times reported that Frawley died in the street. Contrary to popular belief, Frawley did not live in the Knickerbocker at the time of his death; although he had spent nearly 30 years living in an upstairs suite, he moved to the El Royale several months before he died.

Other notable Knickerbocker guests during the building's heyday include Bette Davis, Cecil B. DeMille, Cary Grant, Howard Hughes, Louis B. Mayer, Elinor Mordaunt, Maureen O'Sullivan, Frank Sinatra, Red Skelton, Lana Turner, Mae West, Judy Garland, Orson Welles, and Errol Flynn.

=== Deterioration and restoration ===
By the late 1960s, the neighborhood around the Knickerbocker had deteriorated, and the Knickerbocker itself was run down and taken over by gangs, drug addicts, and prostitutes. In 1970, the hotel was converted into senior housing.

In 1985, the Hollywood Boulevard Commercial and Entertainment District was added to the National Register of Historic Places, with the Knickerbocker Hotel listed as a contributing property in the district. In 1998, the Knickerbocker's neon sign was illuminated after being dark for decades and a plaque honoring Griffith was placed on the building.

== Architecture and design ==
The United States Department of the Interior cite the Hollywood Knickerbocker Hotel as having Classical architecture, while Los Angeles's Water and Power Associates cite building as featuring Spanish Colonial and Renaissance Revival/Beaux Arts architecture on different pages of the same document. The building is U-shaped and features symmetrical massing on its primary facade, a stringcourse that separates the street level from the upper stories, and central bay upper-story windows punctuated by stone molding.

The building's lobby originally combined Italian, French, and Spanish styles to create what was considered "the most elegant [lobby] in Hollywood."

== Filming location ==
The building's central-Hollywood location has resulted in it appearing in numerous film and television productions, either directly or indirectly. For example, in the 1936 film The Reckless Way, Marian Nixon's character worked in the hotel. In the 1950 film 711 Ocean Drive, the hotel was the backdrop of a syndicate meeting. The hotel and its surroundings also served as the backdrop for the opening scene of a first-season episode of the 1966 series Mission Impossible.

Between 1964 and 1970, viewers of the ABC variety series The Hollywood Palace would regularly see the hotel and its neon sign in the background of performances taped in the Hollywood Palace's parking lot, located directly behind the hotel.

The sign over the building's front entrance identifying it as a hotel was still in place when the TV series Mannix filmed a scene there for the 1970 episode, "Only One Death to a Customer" (Season 3, Episode 20).

== See also ==
- List of contributing properties in the Hollywood Boulevard Commercial and Entertainment District
