= Eunice Pringle =

American dance and rape victim (1912–1996)

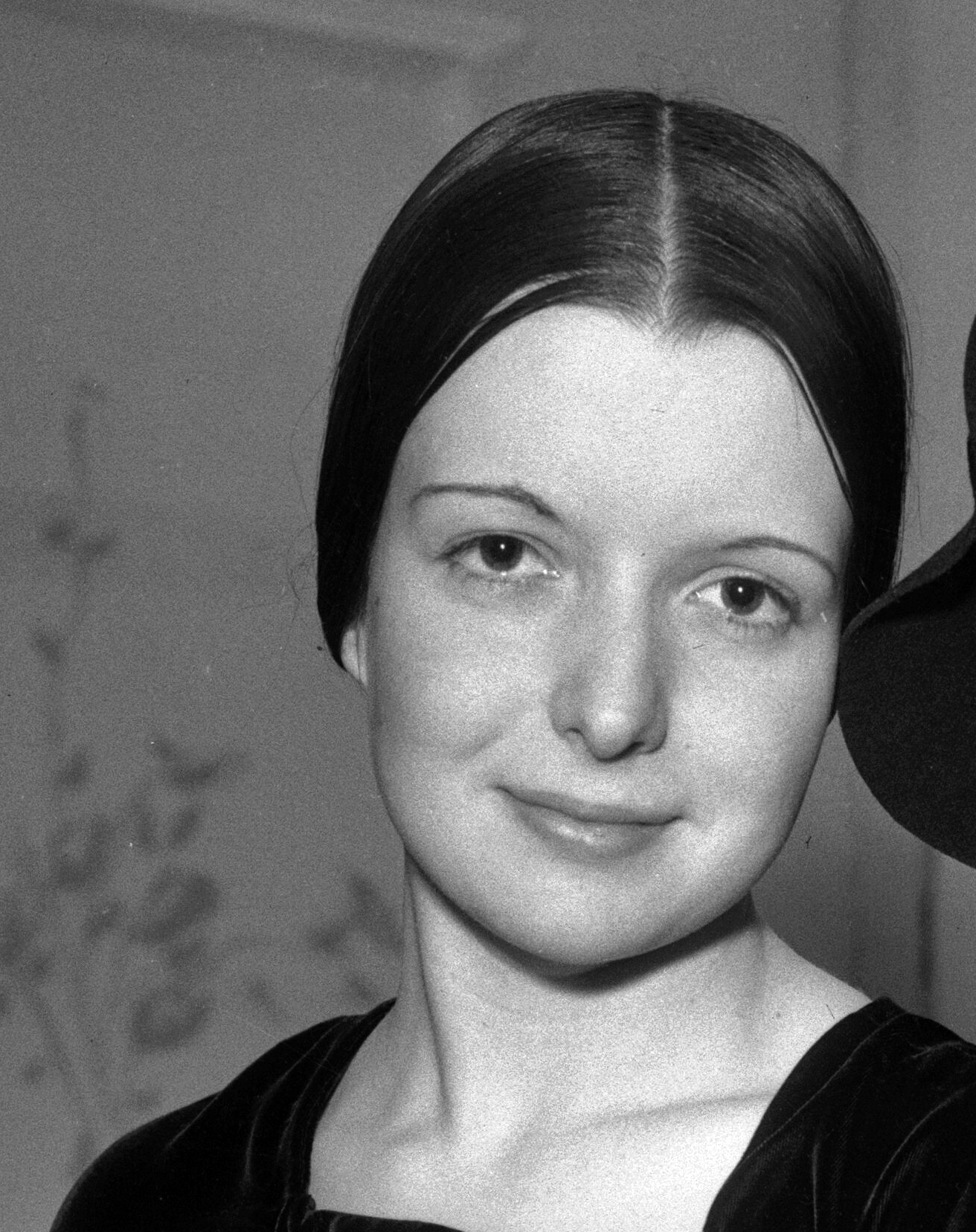
- Pringle in 1932
- Born: Eunice Irene Pringle; March 5, 1912; Garden Grove, California, U.S.
- Died: March 26, 1996 (aged 84)
- Known for: Accusing Alexander Pantages of rape
- Spouse(s): Robert White (m. 1935, divorced) Richard Ellis Worthington (m. 1947)
- Children: 1

Eunice Irene Pringle (March 5, 1912, Garden Grove, California – March 26, 1996) was an aspiring dancer, notable for accusing Los Angeles movie-house owner Alexander Pantages of rape in 1929, resulting in a sensational trial.

== 1929 trial ==
Pringle alleged that Pantages had attacked her on August 9, 1929, in a tiny side-office of his downtown theater after she came to see him to discuss her audition. Newspaper coverage of the trial, particularly by William Randolph Hearst's Los Angeles Examiner, was antagonistic towards the Greek-accented Pantages, while portraying Pringle as the innocent victim.

In countless stories in the Examiner from the moment the case broke in the newspaper on August 10, 1929, until the end of the trial, Pantages was portrayed as variously alone, aloof, cold, emotionless, effete, and European, while the American-born Pringle was portrayed as "the sweetest 17 since Clara Bow". There were portraits with her family, tearful outbursts in court and lengthy interviews in the press, which depicted her with a sense of decorum and empathy. Pantages gave no interviews during the trial.

Pantages was found guilty and he was sentenced to 50 years in prison. However, his conviction was overturned on appeal. In the equally sensationalized retrial, the defense was now allowed to use testimony relating to Pringle's moral character, and attempted to portray her as a woman of "low morals". The retrial ended in Pantages's acquittal in 1931. Later that year, Pringle settled her $1,000,000 civil suit against Pantages for $3,000.

== Later years ==
The conviction destroyed Pantages's reputation. Despite his success on appeal, he sold his chain to Joseph P. Kennedy Sr.'s RKO and Warner Bros. After the incident, Pringle withdrew from show business.

A story later circulated that Pringle implicated Kennedy in a deathbed confession in the throes of evident cyanide poisoning soon after the trial. The alleged incident is described in Ronald Kessler's biography of Kennedy, Sins of the Father (1997), as well as in Kenneth Anger's Hollywood Babylon II (1984). Another widely repeated Hollywood myth alleged that Joseph P. Kennedy paid Pringle $10,000 to enter Pantages's office and accuse him of rape, with the goal of destroying his reputation and business prospects and forcing Pantages to accept Kennedy's bid to buy Pantages's theatre chain.

In reality, in 1935, Pringle married Robert White, the heir to a furniture business. The two eventually divorced, and she married Richard Ellis Worthington, a psychologist, in 1947. They lived in Chicago for several years before moving to San Diego County in 1955. The couple had one child, a daughter, Marcy. Pringle died in 1996, aged 84.
