= The Georgian Hotel =

Historic building in Santa Monica, California, U.S.

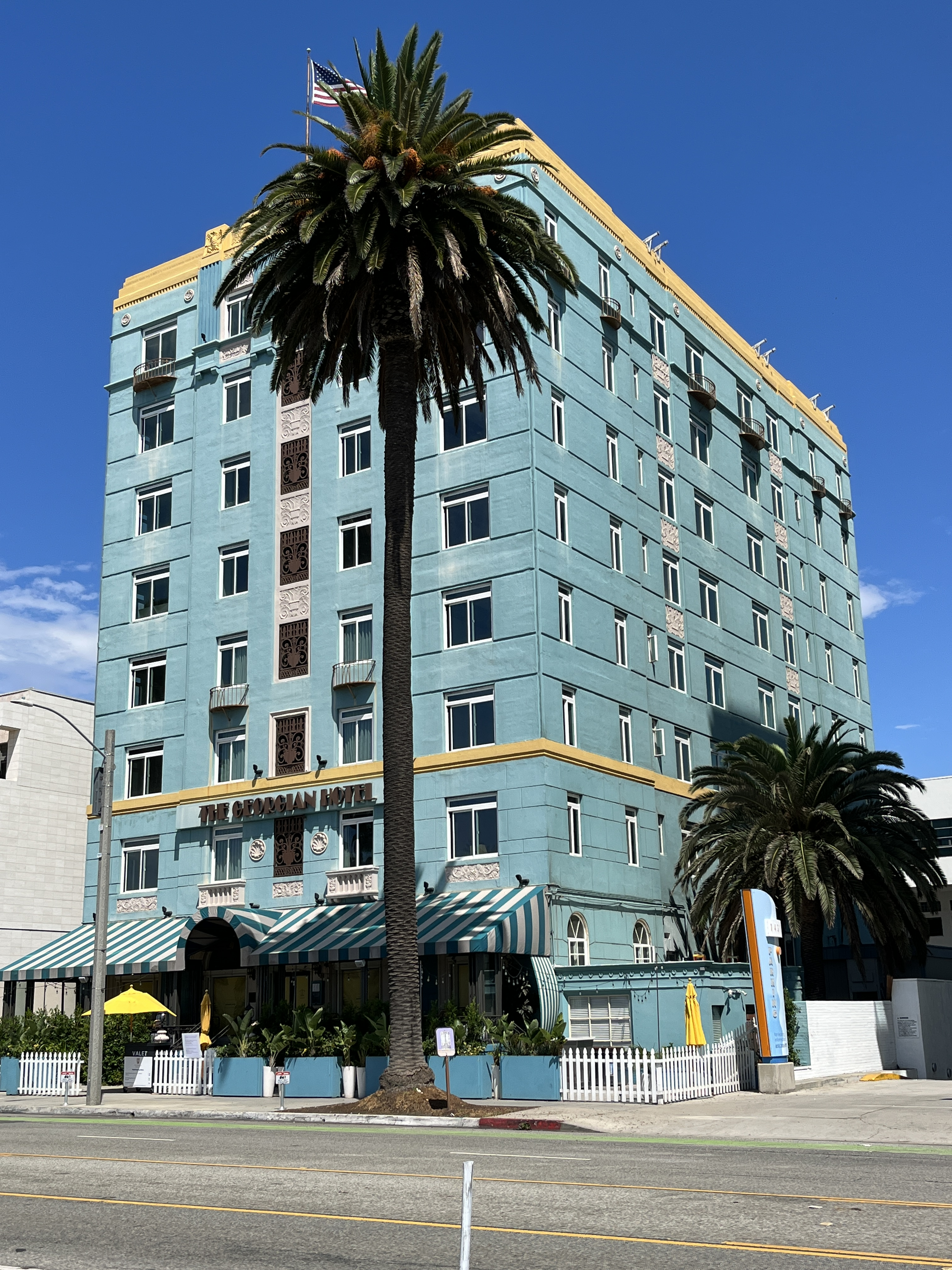
- The building's exterior in 2022
- Interactive map of the The Georgian Hotel area
- Hotel chain: The Unbound Collection by Hyatt

General information
- Coordinates: 34°0′50″N 118°29′50″W

Website
- www.thegeorgian.com

The Georgian Hotel is a historic building in Santa Monica, California, in the United States. An eight story skyscraper designed in the Art Deco style, it opened as a hotel in 1933.

At the height of the prohibition era, the hotel housed a speakeasy hidden at the basement level of the hotel which has since been restored.

The hotel was purchased in 2020 by the BLVD Hospitality and has since reopened as a hotel.

== See also ==
- List of City of Santa Monica Designated Historic Landmarks
