= John M. Cooper (architect) =

American architect

- Born: July 11, 1883; Ohio
- Died: May 27, 1950 (aged 66); Los Angeles County, California
- Education: Yale University
- Occupation: Architect
- Buildings: Hollywood Knickerbocker Hotel; Roxie Theatre; Wilshire Theatre

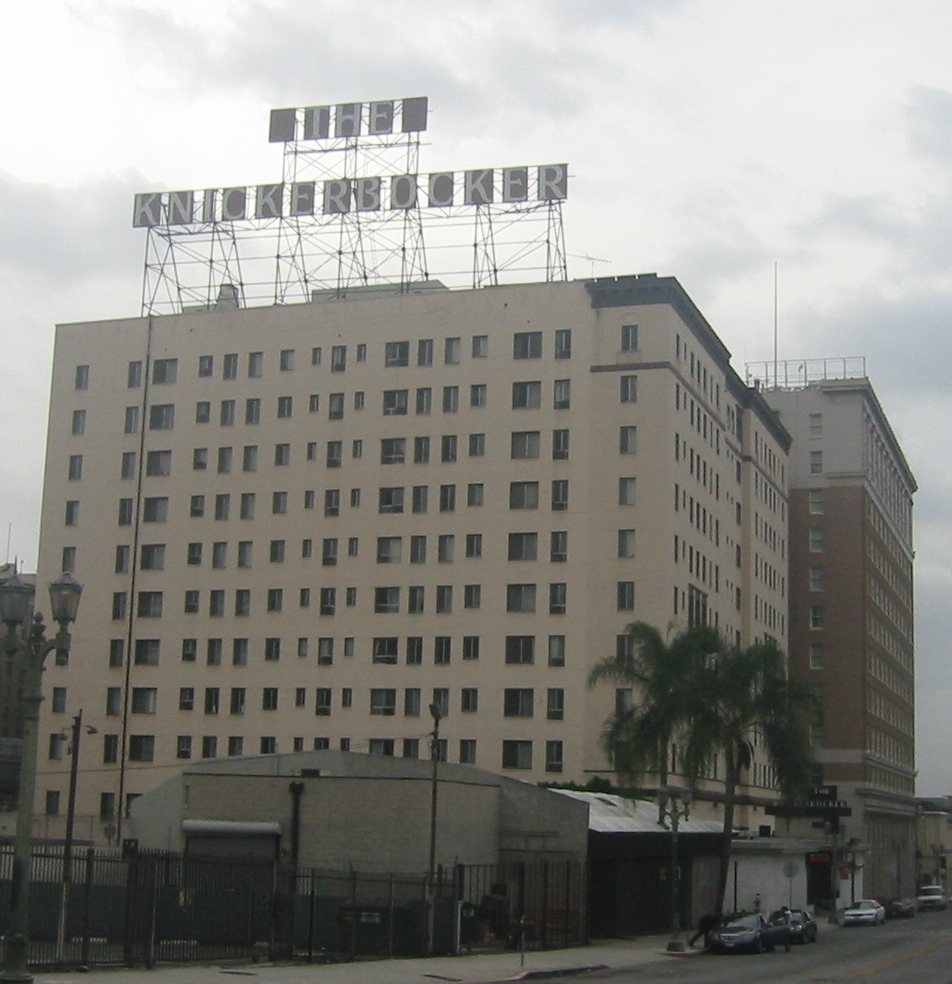
Hollywood Knickerbocker Hotel

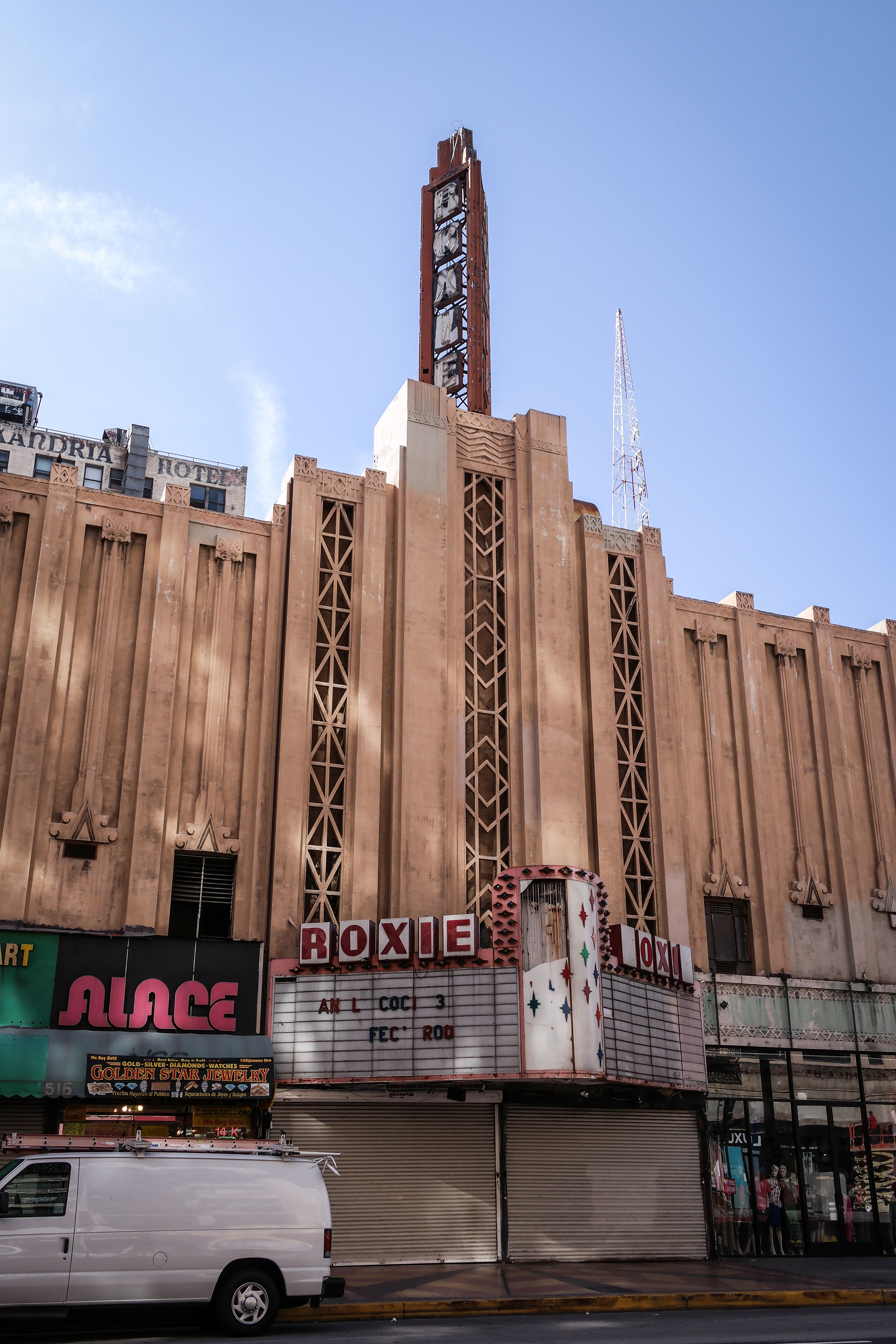
Roxie Theatre

John Montgomery Cooper (1885–1954) was an American architect known for his work in and around Los Angeles, California. The city of Santa Monica considers him "a successful local architect with an accomplished career... [that] did not reach the level of Master Architect."

== Biography ==
John Cooper was born in Ohio on July 11, 1883, and died on May 27, 1950, in Los Angeles County, California. He graduated from Yale University.

== Career ==
John Cooper received his certificate to practice architecture in California in 1913. His practice was located in Long Beach.

Cooper's notable works in southern California include:

- Electric Corporation Building, Los Angeles, 1924
- Hollywood Knickerbocker Hotel, Los Angeles, 1929, contributing property in the Hollywood Boulevard Commercial and Entertainment District
- Wilshire Theatre, Santa Monica, 1930, Santa Monica Historic Landmark No. 81
- Roxie Theatre, Los Angeles, 1932, Los Angeles Historic Cultural Monument No. 526, contributing property in the Broadway Theater and Commercial District
- Two dormitories, a library, and an administration building at George Pepperdine College, Los Angeles, 1937
- San Bernardino City Hall No. 3, San Bernardino, 1937–1938, demolished in 1969

Cooper also worked as an engineer on the Panama Canal.

== See also ==
- List of American architects
- List of people from Los Angeles
