= Metropolitan Theatres (Los Angeles) =

Movie theatre chain in southern California

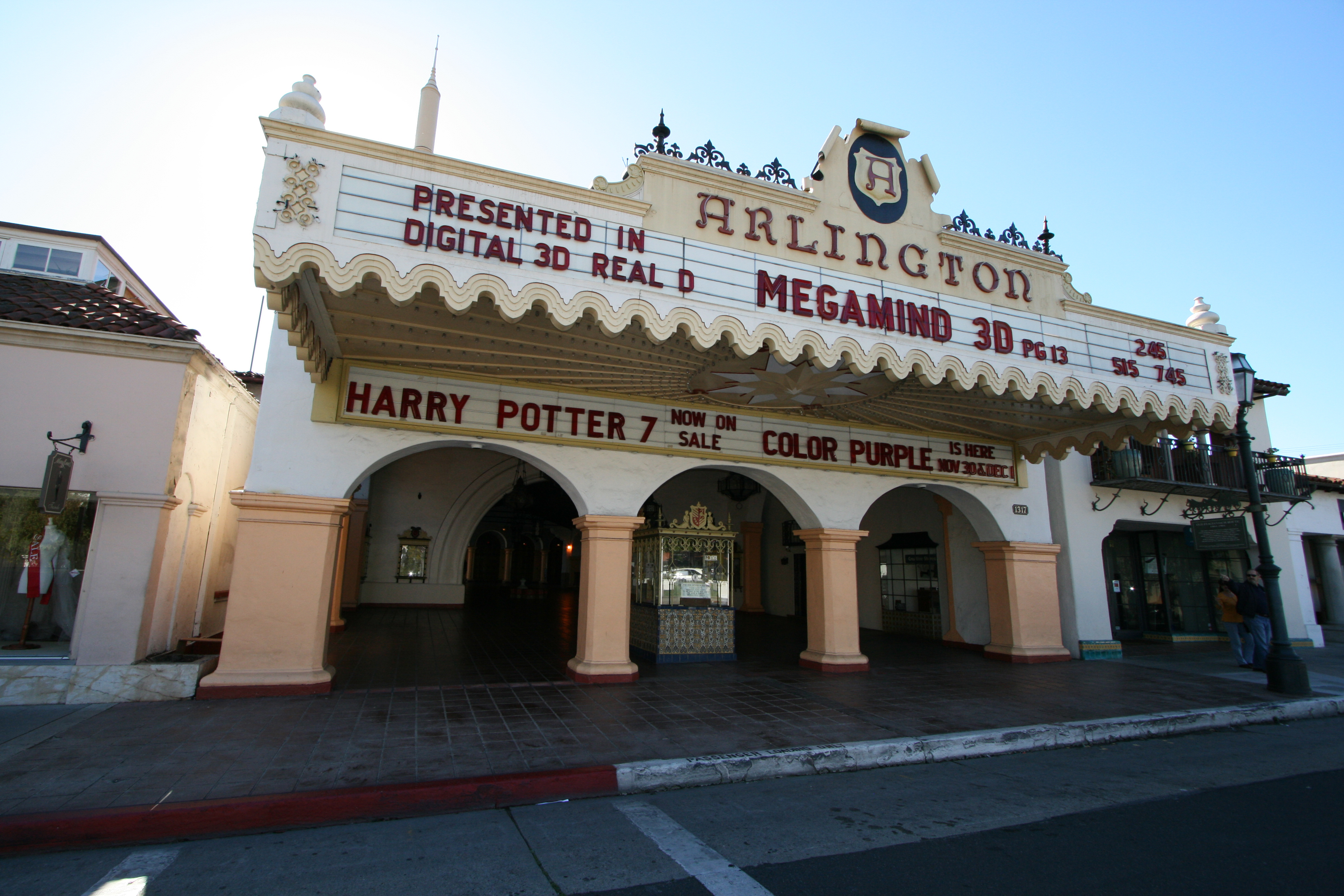
- Metropolitan Theatres owned Arlington Theatre in Santa Barbara
- Type: Private
- Industry: Entertainment
- Founded: 1923; 103 years ago
- Founder: Joseph Corwin
- Fate: Filed for Chapter 11 bankruptcy in 2024
- Headquarters: Los Angeles, United States
- Area served: Southern California; Loveland and Steamboat Springs, Colorado; Park City, Utah
- Key people: David Corwin (CEO)
- Services: Movie theater
- Owner: Corwin family
- Website: www.metrotheatres.com

Metropolitan Theatres is Los Angeles's oldest movie theater chain. Opened in 1923, they filed for Chapter 11 bankruptcy in 2024, at which point they owned 15 theaters: ten in southern California (including seven out of eight in Santa Barbara), three in Colorado, and two in Utah.

== History ==
Metropolitan Theatres was founded by Joseph Corwin in 1923. At the time, the Corwin family operated almost every movie theater in downtown Los Angeles's Broadway Theater District, the city's premiere theater venue until Hollywood was built up in the 1920s and 30s.

In the 1950s, Metropolitan Theatres expanded into Santa Barbara. In the 1970s, they shifted to blaxploitation films in their downtown Los Angeles theaters, and in the 1980s, those same theaters shifted again, to Spanish language cinema. The company at one point had more than 1000 employees.

The company filed for Chapter 11 bankruptcy in 2024. Chief Executive Officer David Corwin blamed the bankruptcy on the COVID-19 pandemic, which he said was "devastating to the business," as well as the WGA and SAG-AFTRA strikes and increased labor, rent, and utilities expenses.

== List of theatres ==
Notable theaters that have been either owned or operated by Metropolitan Theatres include:

=== Greater Los Angeles ===
==== Broadway Theater District ====
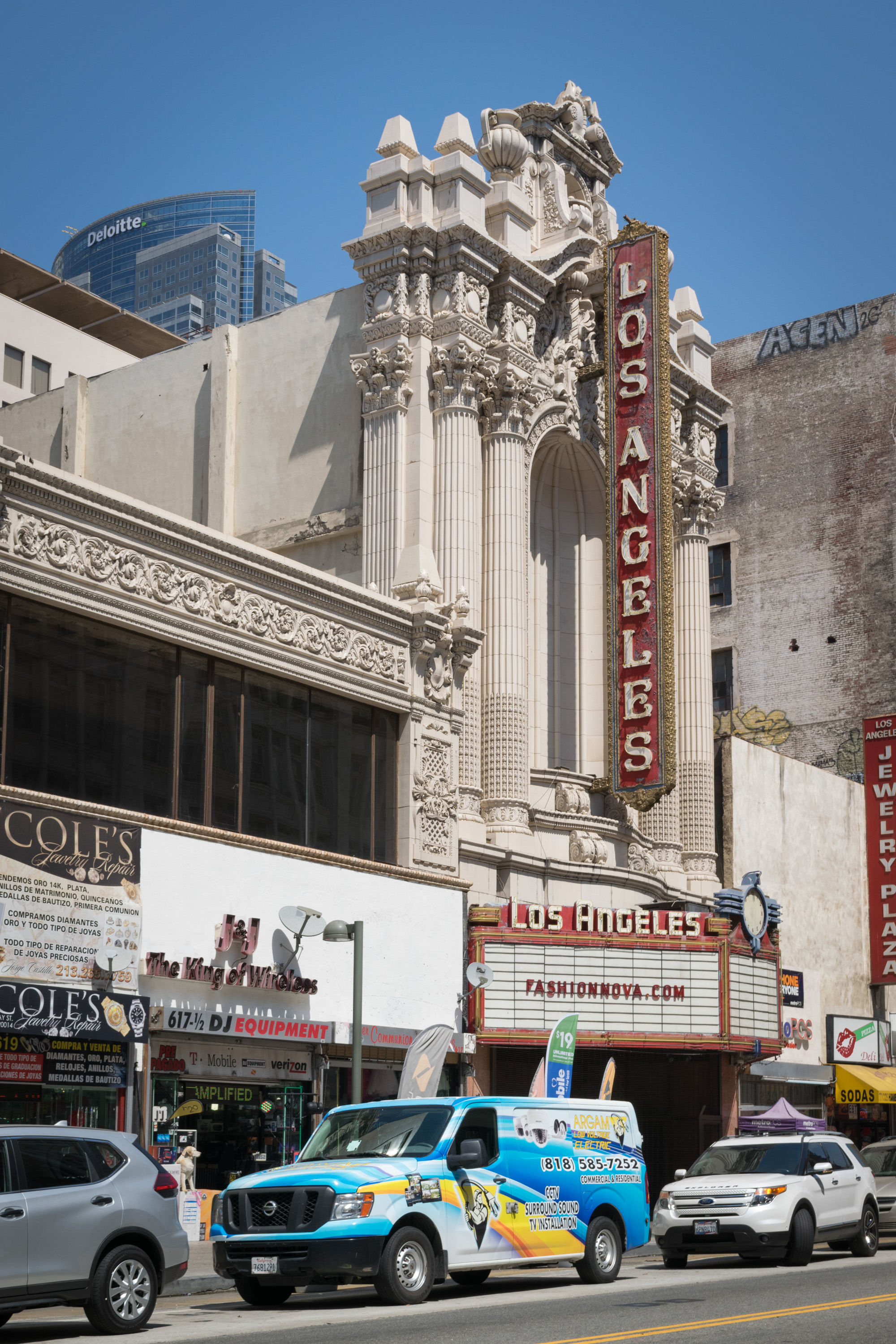
Los Angeles Theatre, Los Angeles

- Los Angeles
- Orpheum
- State
- Tower
- Palace
- Arcade
- Roxie
- Rialto
- Globe
- United Artists
- Cameo
- Broadway

==== Other ====
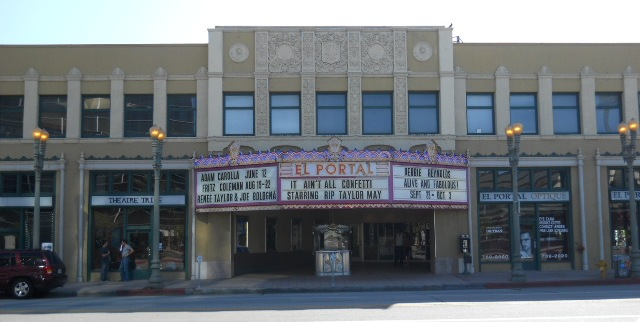
El Portal Theatre, North Hollywood

- El Miro, Santa Monica
- El Portal, North Hollywood
- Frida Cinema, Santa Ana
- Olympic, downtown Los Angeles
- Warrens, downtown Los Angeles
- The Westlake, Westlake
- WGA, Beverly Hills

=== Elsewhere in California ===
- Arlington, Santa Barbara
- Paseo Nuevo, Santa Barbara
- Orpheum, San Francisco
