= List of City of Santa Monica Designated Historic Landmarks =

This is a List of City of Santa Monica Designated Historic Landmarks.

== Ordinance ==
As the 1975 Santa Monica Centennial approached, the City Council created the Historical Site Committee, and adopted the Landmarks and Historic District Ordinance on March 24, 1976. The Santa Monica Landmarks and Historic Districts Ordinance was amended in 1987 and again in 1991, to create a more comprehensive preservation program. The ordinance established a seven-member appointed Landmarks Commission with the power to designate Structures of Merit and Landmarks, and to make recommendations to the City Council regarding the designation of potential Historic Districts.

== Criteria ==
The Landmarks Commission may approve the landmark designation of a structure, improvement, natural feature or an object if it finds that it meets one or more of the following criteria:

1. It exemplifies, symbolizes, or manifests elements of the cultural, social, economic, political or architectural history of the city.
2. It has aesthetic or artistic interest or value, or other noteworthy interest or value.
3. It is identified with historic personages or with important events in local, state or national history.
4. It embodies distinguishing architectural characteristics valuable to a study of a period, style, method of construction, or the use of indigenous materials or craftsmanship, or is a unique or rare example of an architectural design, detail or historical type valuable to such a study.
5. It is a significant or a representative example of the work or product of a notable builder, designer or architect.
6. It has a unique location, a singular physical characteristic, or is an established and familiar visual feature of a neighborhood, community or the city.

== Listing of the City of Santa Monica Designated City Landmarks ==
#	Name	Image	Location	Designated	Built	Architect/Description
1	Rapp Saloon		1438 Second Street; 34.0138°N 118.4964°W	08/20/1975	1875	Spencer & Pugh, Bricklayers
2	Miles Playhouse		1130 Lincoln Boulevard; 34.02287°N 118.49550°W	10/15/1975	1929	John Byers
3	Looff Hippodrome		Foot of Colorado Avenue; 34.01023°N 118.49635°W	08/17/1976	1916	Originally called Looff Pier; various builders
4	Santa Monica Pier		100-400 Santa Monica Pier; 34.00794°N 118.49957°W	08/17/1976		
5	Miramar Moreton Bay Fig Tree		Ocean Avenue @ Wilshire Blvd. 34.01783°N 118.50137°W	08/17/1976	Planted prior to 1900	
6	Methodist Episcopal Church		2621 Second Street; 34.00229°N 118.48214°W	01/04/1977	1876	
7	Ocean Park Branch Library		2601 Main Street; 34.00272°N 118.48377°W	05/03/1977	ca 1918	Kegly & Gerity, funded by Carnegie Corp.
8	Parkhurst Building		185 Pier Avenue / 2940 Main Street; 33.99870°N 118.48045°W	12/06/1977	1927	Norman F. Marsh & Company
9	First Roy Jones House		2612 Main Street; 34.00227°N 118.48376°W	01/02/1979	1894	Sumner P. Hunt
10	Horatio West Court		140 Hollister Avenue; 34.00358°N 118.48704°W	01/02/1979	1921	Irving Gill
11	Gussie Moran House		1323 Ocean Avenue; 34.01516°N 118.49861°W	01/27/1979	1891	
12	Santa Monica City Hall		1685 Main Street; 34.01209°N 118.49152°W	10/16/1979	1938	Donald B. Parkinson & J.M. Estep
13	California Live Oak Tree (dead & removed)		1443 Tenth Street; 34.02024°N 118.48841°W	01/15/1980	Planted prior to 1899	
14	John W. & Anna George House		2424 Fourth Street; 34.00543°N 118.48328°W	03/17/1980	1911	
15	Oregon Avenue Sidewalk sign west		Corner of Santa Monica Blvd. & Fifth Street; 34.01747°N 118.49432°W	05/20/1981	Prior to 1912	
16	Marion Davies Estate North Guest House		321 Palisades Beach Road; 34.02490°N 118.51340°W	07/17/1980	1929	Julia Morgan
17	John Byers Office		246 Twenty-Sixth Street; 34.04772°N 118.49106°W	03/12/1982	1926-54	John Byers
18	Donald B. Parkinson (Demolished)		1605 San Vicente Blvd. 34.04172°N 118.50233°W	06/07/1985	1926	Donald B. Parkinson
19	Rotating Beacon Tower; Santa Monica Airport		Adjacent to 3223 Donald Loop; 34.01889°N 118.44910°W	08/11/1988	1928	Moved to Santa Monica in 1952
20	Henry Weaver House		142 Adelaide Drive; 34.02849°N 118.51455°W	05/11/1989	1910	Milwaukee Building Company
21	Moses Hostetter House		2601 Second Street; 34.00273°N 118.48269°W	04/12/1990	1893	
22	Henry Weyse/Charles Morris House		401 Ocean Avenue; 34.02582°N 118.51180°W	09/13/1990	1910	Robert D. Farquhar
23	Hollister Court		2402 Fourth Street and 2401 Third Street; 34.00542°N 118.48382°W	12/13/1990	1904 to early 1920s	
24	Santa Monica Bay Woman's Club Building		1210 Fourth Street; 34.01878°N 118.49813°W	04/08/1991	1914	Henry C. Hollwedel
25	Vanity Fair Apartments		822 Third Street; 34.02320°N 118.50525°W	09/08/1992	1935	Carl R. Henderson
26	Gillis House		406 Adelaide Drive; 34.03078°N 118.51188°W	03/08/1993	1905	Myron Hunt & Elmer Grey
27	Henshey's Tegner Building & Annex (Demolition ordered 1994)		402-420 Santa Monica Blvd. 34.01656°N 118.49484°W	06/20/1994	1925 & 1936 (annex)	Henry C. Hollwedel
28	Mayfair Theatre (Majestic Theatre)		212-216 Santa Monica Blvd. 34.01519°N 118.49644°W	07/11/1994	1911	Henry C. Hollwedel
29	Charmont Apartments		330 California Avenue; 34.02056°N 118.49979°W	11/10/1994	1929	Max Maltzman
30	Georgian Hotel		1415 Ocean Avenue; 34.01382°N 118.49751°W	02/22/1995	1931	M. Eugene Durfee
31	Sovereign Hotel		205 Washington Avenue; 34.02096°N 118.50359°W	01/08/1996	1928	Meyer-Radon
32	Merle Norman House		2523 Third Street; 34.00408°N 118.48271°W	06/10/1996	1935	Ellis G. Martin
33	Shingle Style House (Demolished)		1127 Sixth Street; 34.02194°N 118.49710°W	10/14/1996	1905	
34	Second Roy Jones House		130 Adelaide Drive; 34.0280°N 118.5145°W	08/11/1997	1907	Attributed to Robert D. Farquhar
35	Charles Warren Brown House		2504 Third Street; 34.00408°N 118.48325°W	08/11/1997	1908	Charles Warren Brown
36	Shotgun House		2712 Second Street; 34.00317°N 118.48378°W	11/11/1999	1899	
37	Aeroplane Bungalow		315 Tenth Street; 34.03447°N 118.50491°W	04/12/1999	1912	
38	Fones Residence		555 Seventh Street; 34.02907°N 118.50427°W	04/10/2000	1914	W.S. Freeman, Contractor
39	The Palama		211 Alta Avenue; 34.02541°N 118.50854°W	05/08/2000	1922	W.R. Covington
40	Victorian House		1333 Ocean Avenue; 34.01516°N 118.49861°W	08/14/2001	1906	
41	Lido Hotel		1455 Fourth Street; 34.01567°N 118.49374°W	11/12/2001	1931	Harbin F. Hunter
42	Isaac Milbank House		236 Adelaide Drive; 34.02941°N 118.51348°W	03/11/2002	1911	Meyer & Holler/ Milwaukee Building Co.
43	Santa Monica Civic Auditorium		1855 Main Street; 34.00941°N 118.48930°W	04/09/2002	1958	Welton Becket & Associates
44	Merle Norman Building		2525 Main Street; 34.00316°N 118.48432°W	11/11/2002	1936	H.G. Thursby
45	Turn of the Century Cottage		954 Fifth Street; 34.02325°N 118.50092°W	12/9/2002	1906	James Kneen
46	Deodar Cedar Tree		918 Fifth Street; 34.02369°N 118.50146°W	12/9/2002	1898	104 yrs. old when designated
47	Barnum Hall; SAMOHI Campus		601 Pico Blvd. 34.01215°N 118.48664°W	12/9/2002	1938	Marsh, Smith & Powell
48	A. McFadden Residence		317 Georgina Ave. 34.02810°N 118.51021°W	2/10/2003	1923	Weber, Staunton and Spaulding
49	Streamline Moderne Commercial		507-17 Wilshire Blvd. 34.02059°N 118.49708°W	2/10/2003	1940	W. Douglas Lee
50	Worrell "Zuni House"		710 Adelaide Place; 34.03353°N 118.50868°W	3/10/2003	1923	Robert Stacey-Judd
51	Craftsman style Residence		502 Raymond Avenue; 34.0028°N 118.4784°W	4/14/2003	1913	
52	John Byers (Third) Residence		2034 La Mesa Drive; 34.0454°N 118.4980°W	7/14/2003	1929	John Byers
53	Eucalyptus deanei tree		522 Twenty-fourth Street; 34.04279°N 118.48826°W	7/14/2003	1913	Approx. 90 yrs. old when designated. Planter: Hugh Evans
54	American Foursquare Residence		128 Hollister Ave; 34.00403°N 118.48705°W	8/26/2003	1905	
55	R.D. Farquhar Residence		147 Georgina Ave; 34.02673°N 118.51127°W	10/13/2003	1911	Robert D. Farquhar
56	Embassy Hotel Apartments		1001 Third Street; 34.02143°N 118.50197°W	10/13/2003	1927	Arthur E. Harvey
57	California bungalow		1414 Idaho Avenue; 34.03146°N 118.49348°W	12/8/2003	1923	A. Scott
58	Neimeyer/Strick House		1911 La Mesa Drive; 34.04446°N 118.49966°W	12/8/2003	1964	Oscar Niemeyer
59	E.C. Japs/Crossland Residence		2511 Beverly Avenue; 34.00637°N 118.48005°W	03/8/2004	1912	Jones Brothers
60	Spanish Colonial Revival Commercial Building		1337 Ocean Avenue; 34.01516°N 118.49861°W	7/12/2004	1926	
61	Byers Adobe Residence		404 Georgina Avenue; 34.02856°N 118.50913°W	11/08/2004	1920	John Byers
62	Sears Department Store		302 Colorado Avenue; 34.01298°N 118.49261°W	12/13/2004	1947	Rowland Crawford
63	Bay Cities Guaranty Building		225 Santa Monica Blvd; 34.01519°N 118.49644°W	12/13/2004	1929	Walker & Eisen
64	Zucky's Wall Sign		431 Wilshire Blvd; 34.01968°N 118.49760°W	06/13/2005	1962	
65	Mediterranean/Classical Revival Style Residence		331 Palisades Avenue; 34.02544°N 118.50637°W	07/11/2005	1913	Frank Meline
66	Santa Monica Professional Building		710 Wilshire Blvd; 34.02152°N 118.49493°W	08/08/2005	1928	Arthur E. Harvey
67	Turn-of-the-Century Victorian Cottage		1012 Second Street; 34.02007°N 118.50303°W	09/12/2005	Circa 1898-1902	
68	Phillips Chapel Christian Methodist Episcopal Church		2001 Fourth Street; 34.00900°N 118.48605°W	10/10/2005	Circa 1890s (located at site since 1908)	
69	Regency Moderne Apartment Building		1143 Eleventh Street; 34.02516°N 118.49229°W	11/14/2005	1938	James M. Weaver
70	Eucalyptus Cornuta Tree		1407 Hill Street; 34.00922°N 118.46819°W	03/22/2006	Approx. 90 years old when designated	
71	Former Gold Coast Colonial Revival Style Residence		2323 Fifth Street; 34.00679°N 118.48276°W	07/10/2006	Circa 1925 (located at site since 1936)	
72	Elkhorn Apartments/Sandy Bay House		1401 Palisades Beach Road; 34.01380°N 118.49913°W	07/10/2006	1909	
73	Tudor Revival Style Residence		501 Twenty-Fourth Street; 34.04279°N 118.48826°W	08/14/2006	1912	A.W. Tyler (Contractor)
74	Turn-of-the-Century Vernacular Beach Cottage		2219 Ocean Avenue; 34.00447°N 118.48814°W	08/14/2006	1905	
75	Colonial Revival Style Apartments		423-431 Ocean Avenue; 34.02582°N 118.51180°W	10/09/2006	1936 & 1950	William E. Foster
76	Teriton Apartments		130 San Vicente Boulevard; 34.02716°N 118.51290°W	11/13/2006	1949	Sanford Kent
77	Horizons West Surf Shop		2001-2011 Main Street; 34.0072°N 118.4887°W	5/14/2007	1922	J. L. Schrurs
78	Streamline Moderne Apartments		822 Euclid Street; 34.03098°N 118.49564°W	8/13/2007	1938	Frank Bivens
79	Palisades Park		1450 Ocean Avenue; 34.01382°N 118.49805°W	9/10/2007	1892	I.G. Le Grande
80	Quonset Hut		829 Broadway; 34.01889°N 118.48893°W	12/10/2007	Quonset hut moved to site in 1946	N/A
81	Wilshire Theatre		1314-1316 Wilshire Boulevard; 34.02610°N 118.48905°W	01/14/2008	1930	John M. Cooper
82	Craftsman Bungalow Cottage		929 Lincoln Boulevard; 34.02599°N 118.49826°W	02/11/2008	1916	Joseph J. Rowe
83	Edwin Building		312 Wilshire Boulevard; 34.01876°N 118.49921°W	04/14/2008	1928	Paul R. Williams
84	Zimmers House (John Byers Adobe)		2101 La Mesa Drive; 34.04538°N 118.49805°W	05/12/2008	1924	John Byers
85	F.R. Siebert House		514 Palisades Avenue; 34.0268°N 118.5042°W	05/12/2008	1911	A.C. Siebert
86	Former JC Penney Building		1202 Third Street; 34.018209°N 118.499200°W	07/14/2008	1949	Milton L. Anderson
87	Keller Block Building		227 Broadway; 34.01399°N 118.495132°W	10/13/2008	1893	Carroll H. Brown
88	Builders Exchange Building		1501-1509 Fourth Street; 34.014971°N 118.493451°W	06/08/2009	1926	Edward Durfee
89	Doctors Building		2125 Arizona Avenue; 34.031432°N 118.480277°W	07/13/2009	Early 1950s	J.E. Loveless
90	Craftsman Style Residence		405 Palisades Avenue; 34.025857°N 118.505703°W	07/13/2009	1912	
91	Shangri-La Hotel		1301 Ocean Avenue; 34.015364°N 118.498978°W	11/09/2009	1939	William E. Foster
92	Mar Vista Apartments		1305 Second Street; 34.016283°N 118.498160°W	12/14/2009	1914	
93	Residential Kit Houses		1047 Ninth Street; 34.024871°N 118.495340°W	12/14/2009	1923	Pacific Ready-Cut Homes
94	Period Revival Residence		2009 La Mesa Drive; 34.044860°N 118.499200°W	11/08/2010	1926	Elmer Grey
95	American Foursquare Residence		1063 Twenty-Sixth Street; 34.037686°N 118.478924°W	03/14/2011		
96	Biedler-Heuer Building		2701-2705 Main Street; 34.001047°N 118.482102°W	01/09/2012	1922	Joseph F. Rhodes
97	Turn-of-the-Century Cottage		2501 Second Street; 34.003585°N 118.483746°W	01/24/2012	1902	
98	Santa Monica Pier Sign		200 Santa Monica Pier; 34.009924°N 118.496405°W	06/11/2012	1941	Pan Pacific Neon Sign Company
99	Chain Reaction Sculpture		1855 Main Street; 34.009031°N 118.489598°W	07/09/2012	1991	Paul Conrad
100	Chez Jay Restaurant		1657 Ocean Avenue; 34.010488°N 118.493239°W	10/08/2012	1945	Britton S. Shriver
101	Craftsman Bungalow		642 Kensington Road; 34.008008°N 118.480770°W	12/10/2012	1917	
102	Palisades Building		101 Wilshire Boulevard; 34.017873°N 118.501623°W	01/14/2013	1924	William Ache
103	Central Tower Building		1424 Fourth Street; 34.015737°N 118.494798°W	03/11/2013	1929	M. Eugene Durfee
104	Art Deco Commercial Building		301-315 Wilshire Boulevard; 34.018731°N 118.499371°W	04/08/2013	1930	Irvin Goodfellow
105	"Bowl" Sign		234 Pico Boulevard; 34.008416°N 118.488430°W	09/09/2013	1958	William L. Rudolph
106	Mayfair Theater Terrazzo		210-214 Santa Monica Boulevard Sidewalk; 34.015218°N 118.497101°W	09/09/2013	1929	Charles Tegner
107	United States Post Office		1248 Fifth Street; 34.019061°N 118.496473°W	03/10/2014	1936	Louis A. Simon
108	Bundy House		401 Twenty-Fifth Street; 34.045141°N 118.489310°W	05-12-2014	1913	Sumner P. Hunt/Silas R. Burns
109	Streamline Moderne Apartment Building		947-953 Eleventh Street; 34.045141°N 118.489310°W	06-09-2014	1937	E.P. Fitzgerald
110	E.J. Carrillo House		1602 Georgina Avenue; 34.040459°N 118.500644°W	06-09-2014	1924	John Byers

== See also ==
- National Register of Historic Places listings in Los Angeles County, California
