= Sovereign Hotel (California) =

Historic apartment building in Santa Monica, California, US

- U.S. National Register of Historic Places
- Santa Monica Historic Landmark
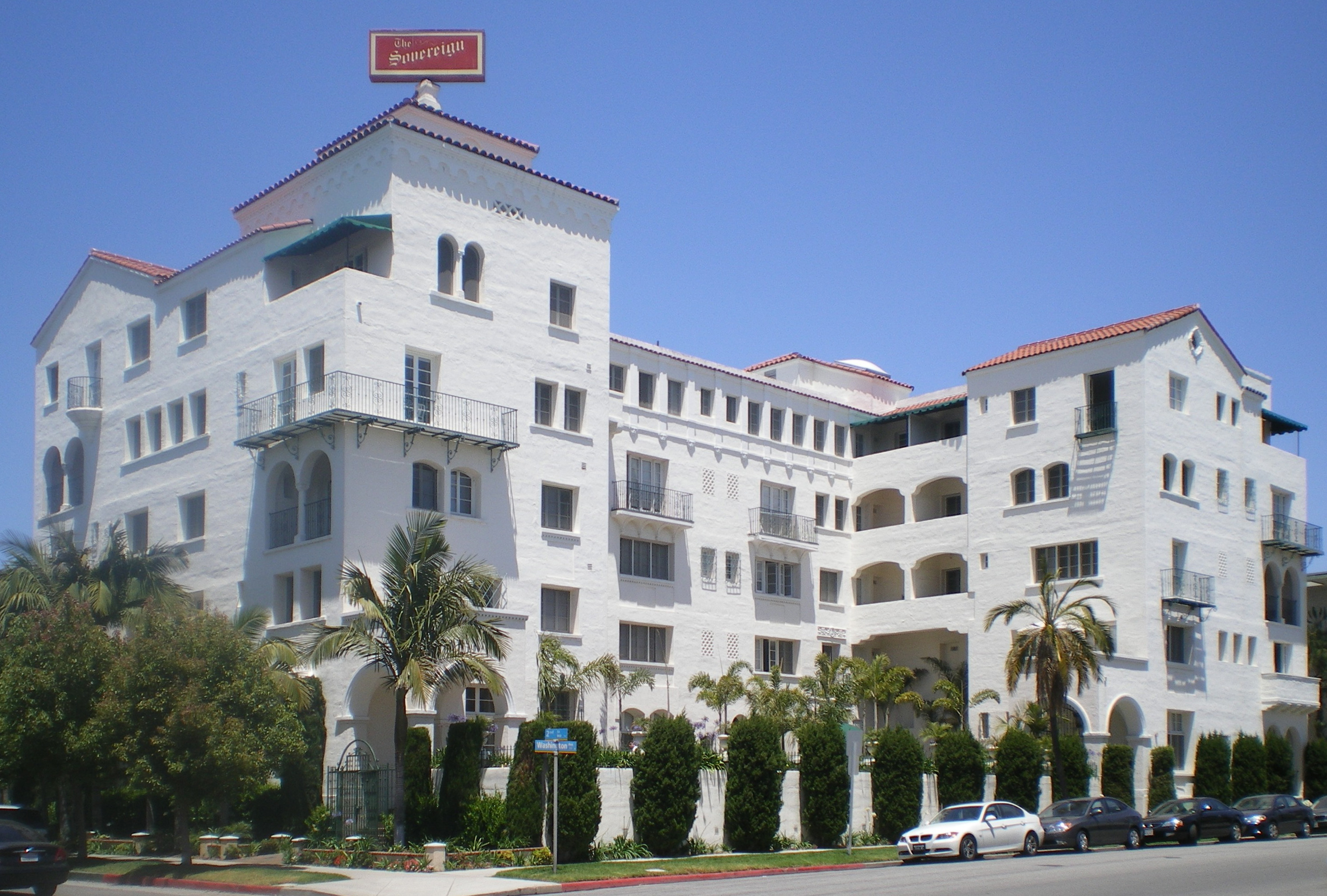
- Sovereign Hotel, 2008

- Location within the Los Angeles metropolitan area Location within California Location within the United States
- Location: Santa Monica, California
- Coordinates: 34°1′13″N 118°30′7″W
- Built: 1928
- Architect: Meyer-Radon, Kurt; Anglo American Building Company
- Architectural style: Mission Revival-Spanish Colonial Revival
- NRHP reference No.: 97001236
- SMHL No.: 31

Significant dates
- Added to NRHP: October 24, 1997
- Designated SMHL: January 8, 1996

The Sovereign is a large five-story, 86 unit hotel and apartment building in Santa Monica, California, United States. Built in 1928, it was designed by architect Kurt Meyer-Radon and the Anglo American Building Company in the Mission Revival-Spanish Colonial Revival styles.

The building contains primarily bachelor, studio, and one-bedroom units.

In the 1930s, the Sovereign's operation appears to have transitioned to include a more traditional hotel format with the construction of the small wing that may have contained a dining room. The street level sign identifying the building as the “Sovereign Hotel” also dates from this era.

In Los Angeles: An Architectural Guide, David Gebhard and Robert Winter, wrote, "There was no reticence here on the part of the architect in showing how many Spanish Colonial Revival forms and details could be used."

The Sovereign Hotel was listed in the National Register of Historic Places in 1997.
