= Downtown Jewelry Exchange =

Building in Los Angeles, California, United States

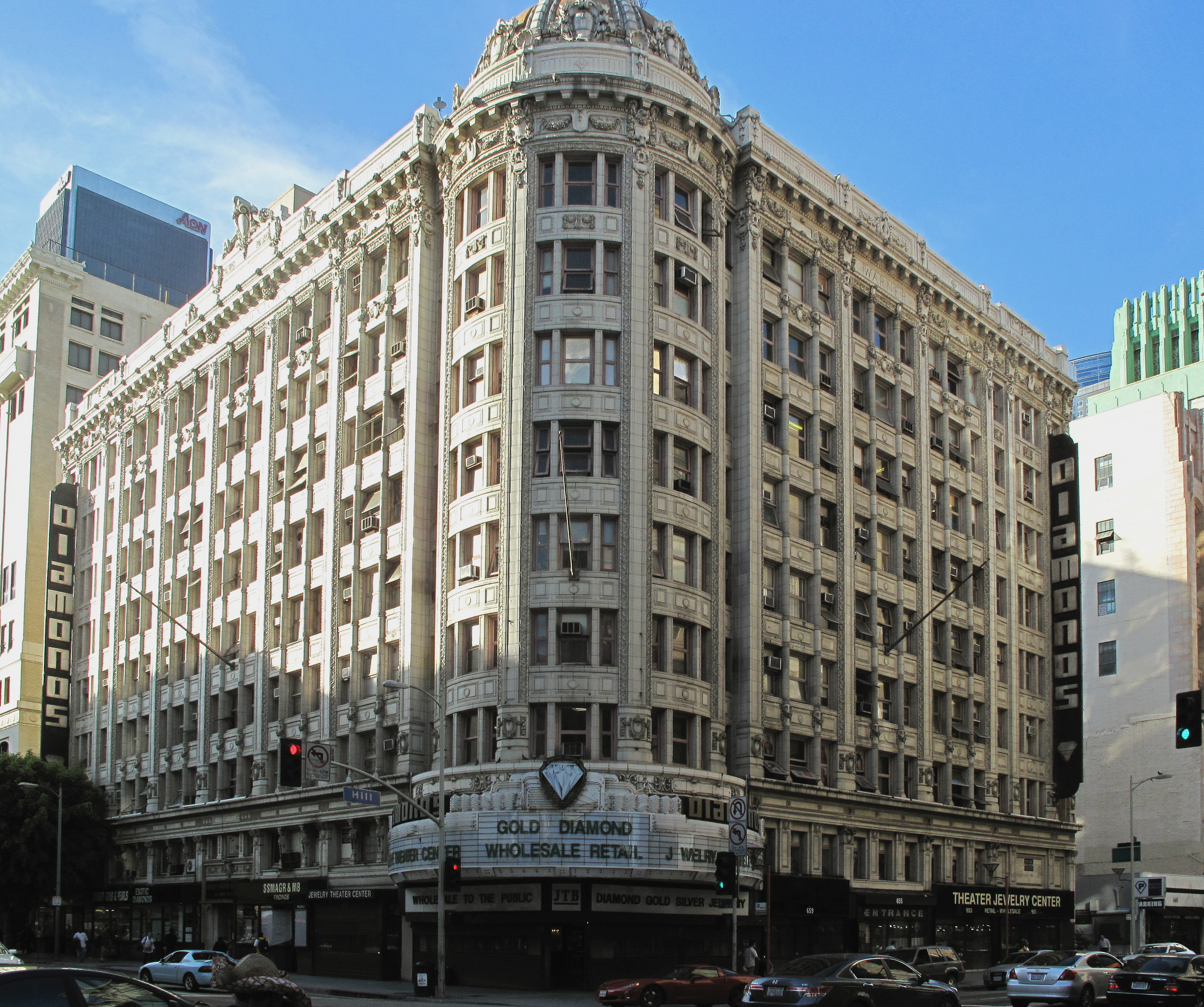
- The building in 2012
- Former names: Pantages Theatre; Warner Bros. Downtown Theatre; Warrens Theatre

General information
- Location: 401 W. 7th Street and 651 S. Hill, Los Angeles
- Coordinates: 34.04615°N 118.2545°W
- Opened: August 17, 1920
- Renovated: 1975

Design and construction
- Architect: B. Marcus Priteca

Downtown Jewelry Exchange, formerly Pantages Theatre, Warner Bros. Downtown Theatre, and Warrens Theatre, is a historic nine-story building and former vaudeville theater and movie palace located on the corner of 7th and Hill in the Jewelry District in downtown Los Angeles.

== History ==
Downtown Jewelry Exchange was designed by B. Marcus Priteca, built as Pantages Theatre, and opened with vaudeville and a screening of The Courage of Marge O'Doone on August 17, 1920. The theater sat 2200 and was the second home of the Pantages circuit, after they left the nearby Arcade Theatre. This building, which was nine-stories in height, also housed shops and offices.

In 1929, Pantages sold all its theaters to RKO Pictures, who then sold this theater to Warner Bros. Pictures. It then became Warner Bros. Downtown Theatre and its first screening was Gold Diggers of Broadway. Warner Bros Pictures owned and operated the theater until the 1960s, when Metropolitan Theatres bought it. They then renamed it Warrens Theatre and operated it until 1975.

After Metropolitan Theatres sold the theater, it was used as a church, then in 1978, it became a retail outlet for The Jewelry Exchange as the neighborhood became the Jewelry District. At this point, the main floor auditorium seats were removed, although the balcony and interior theater decorations remain.

In 2016, the building was listed as a contributing property in both the Hill Street Commercial Historic District and the Seventh Street Commercial Historic District.

== Architecture and design ==
Downtown Jewelry Exchange is L-shaped, steel-frame, and features a Beaux Arts design with additional Greek treatments. The exterior is covered in white terra cotta and features a corner marquee, above which is an imposing domed corner tower. The facade features floral decorations and Greek-inspired sculptures, and the words "Warner Bros. Downtown Bldg" remain on the parapet even though Warner Brothers no longer owns the building. Heavy piers divide the facade into three bays.

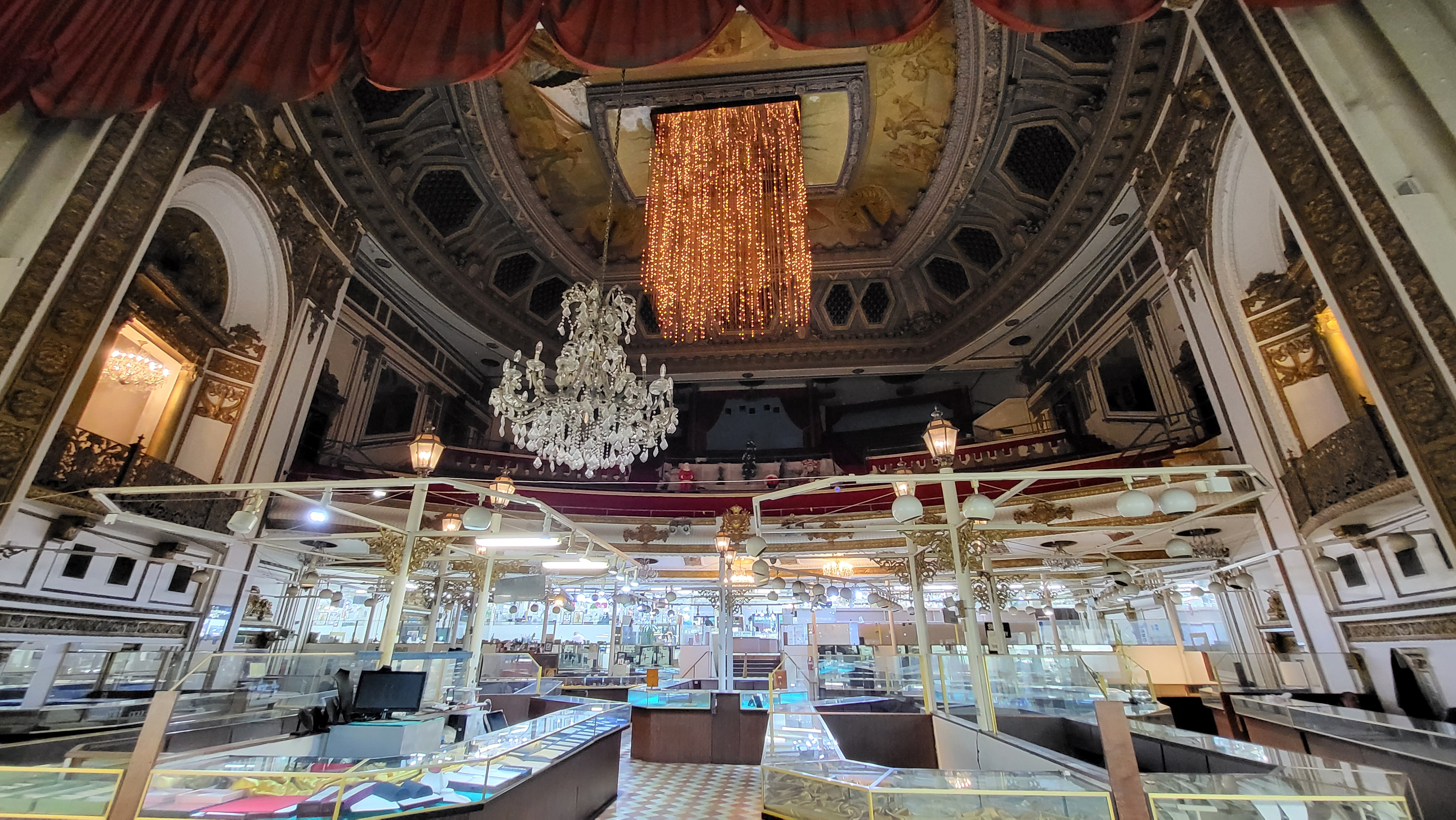
The theater's boxes and balcony seats remain inside the building

Inside, much of the original baroque ornamentation remains. The theater ceiling is covered in a sunburst mural surrounded by Egyptian, Oriental, Greek, and Roman figures, and the stage is flanked by Corinthian columns.

== Filming location ==
The opening theater shots in Funny Girl were filmed in this theater. Lady Killer features a scene on the building's roof and the theater marquee is also shown briefly.
