= Alexander Pantages =

Greek American impresario and vaudeville/film producer

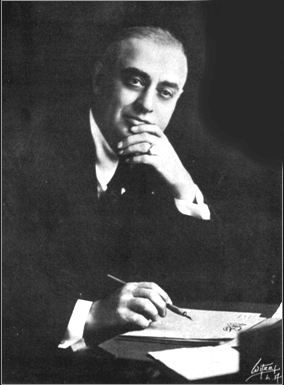
- Pantages, c. 1914
- Born: Periklis Alexandros Pandazis; 1867; Andros, Kingdom of Greece
- Died: February 17, 1936 (aged 68–69)
- Resting place: Forest Lawn Memorial Park, Glendale, California; 34.125499°N 118.240807°W
- Occupations: Vaudeville/film producer, impresario
- Known for: Pantages Theatres

Alexander Pantages (Greek: Περικλῆς Ἀλέξανδρος Πανταζῆς, Periklis Alexandros Pandazis; 1867 – February 17, 1936) was a Greek American vaudeville impresario and early motion picture producer. He created a large and powerful circuit of theatres across the Western United States and Canada.

At the height of his empire, Pantages owned or operated 84 theatres across the United States and Canada. In 1929, he was accused of raping a 17-year-old dancer named Eunice Alice Pringle. He was found guilty but acquitted on appeal. The negative publicity led to the selling of his operations and he permanently ceased being a force in exhibition or vaudeville. He is largely forgotten today in historical accounts of the early development of motion pictures. He died in February 1936.

== Early life ==
There is dispute about his year of birth, but it is likely that he was born in 1867 on the island of Andros, Greece. It is suggested that he was born "Pericles" Pantages but changed it to "Alexander" when he heard about Alexander the Great. In a personal correspondence between Rodney Pantages, son of Alexander, and Arthur Dean Tarrach, Pantages's biographer, this claim is denied. At the age of nine he ran away while with his father on a business trip in Cairo, Egypt. He then went to sea and spent the next two years working as a deck hand. He arrived in the United States in the early 1880s. His ties to his homeland seem mercurial; he never set foot in Greece again although he did assist his relatives financially and even brought his brother, Nicholas, to live in the United States. He often called himself "King Greek", perhaps in emulation of Louis B. Mayer's "Super Jew".

After having been at sea for two years, Pantages disembarked in Panama and spent some time there helping the French to dig the Panama Canal, but after contracting malaria he was warned by a doctor to move to cooler climates. He headed north, stopping briefly in Seattle but eventually settling in San Francisco where he worked as a waiter and also, briefly and unsuccessfully, as a boxer. He left San Francisco in 1897, and made his way to Canada's Yukon Territory during the Klondike Gold Rush, ending up in the mining boom-town of Dawson City.

During his time in the bitter cold of Dawson City, Pantages worked as a waiter and as a porter at the Dawson City Opera House, saving his money to invest in local show business. Subsequently, he managed the venue, presenting shows with a stock company. The venture ended when the Opera House was destroyed in a fire, on January 9, 1900. However, Pantages and the company arranged to build a new venue, with electrical lighting and brick chimneys. Originally scheduled to open less than two weeks after the fire, on February 26, 1900, the Orpheum Theatre had its first "typical night of 'wine, women and song,'" closing at 2:30 the next morning, and taking in over $3,000 ($116,100 in 2025) for "wine and other 'concoctions.'" In June, Pantages acquired a projector and made motion pictures a regular part of the Orpheum bill of fare.

In autumn 1900, Pantages and performer Kathleen 'Kate' Rockwell started working and living together, after she left the troupe that had brought her north from Victoria, BC, just the previous August and joined Pantages's Orpheum company. In November 1902 she returned to Victoria, leasing the Orpheum Theatre there, by February 1903, to present vaudeville and moving pictures. Although details of his departure from the Yukon are unknown, Pantages was proprietor and manager of the theatre by April 1903.

== Starting exhibition ==
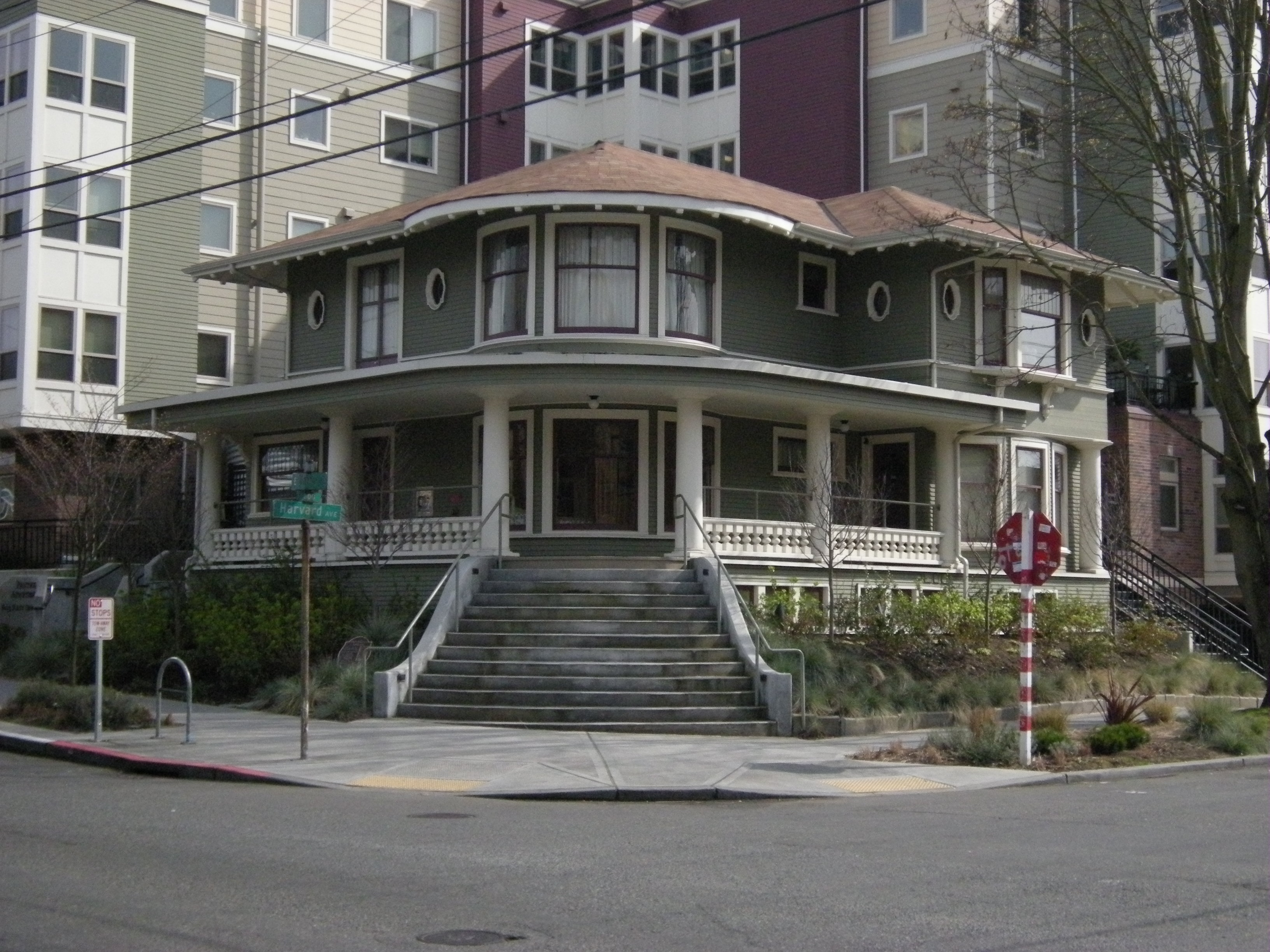
Pantages House in Seattle, built 1907, now a city landmark.

Pantages moved to Seattle, Washington, where he opened the Crystal Theater, a short-form vaudeville and motion picture house of his own. He ran the operation almost entirely by himself, and charged 10 cents admission. This took place a few months after Rockwell had opened up a small storefront movie theater in Vancouver, and later built a theater there in 1907 that stood until 2011, and another in 1914. That same year, he married a musician named Lois Mendenhall (1884–1941). Rockwell filed a breach-of-promise-to-marry lawsuit against him as 'Klondike Kate' that was settled out of court; she later wrote that he had stolen from her the money with which he purchased the Crystal. It would be more than two decades before they saw each other again.

In 1904, Pantages opened a second Seattle theatre, the Pantages; in 1906 he added a stock theater, the Lois, named after his wife. By 1920, he owned more than 30 vaudeville theatres and controlled, through management contracts, perhaps 60 more in both the United States and Canada. These theatres formed the "Pantages Circuit", a chain of theatres into which he could book and rotate touring acts on long-term contracts.

In Seattle Pantages competed with another impresario, John Considine. Their competition included such clandestine methods as stealing acts from each other and committing various forms of sabotage. This competition lasted for several decades and was one of the defining features of the vaudeville circuit of the times.

== Pantages Theatre Circuit ==
Pantages showcased both film and live vaudeville to his audiences. Despite initially refusing to allow African-Americans into his theatres he eventually yielded after being successfully sued by an African-American who had been refused entry into a Pantages theater in Spokane, Washington.

The starting point of the Pantages Circuit was the city of Winnipeg, Manitoba, where Pantages built the Pantages Playhouse in 1914. All Pantages tours originated in Winnipeg and moved from there around the circuit of theatres.

While most of the theatres were owned by others and managed by Pantages, beginning in 1911 he became a builder of theatres all over the western U.S. and Canada. His favored architect in these ventures was B. Marcus Priteca (1881–1971), of Seattle, who regularly worked with muralist Anthony Heinsbergen. Priteca devised an exotic, neo-classical style that his employer called "Pantages Greek".

Pantages often sought out and judged performers personally instead of relying on New York agents like many of his competitors did. Pantages invested his theatrical profits into new outlets and eventually moved to Los Angeles. His showcase theatre at 7th and Hill Street in downtown L.A. also housed his offices.

== Entering Movieland ==
Around 1920, Pantages entered into partnership with the motion picture distributor Famous Players, a subsidiary of film producer Paramount Pictures, and further expanded his "combo" houses, designed to exhibit films as well as staging live vaudeville, to new sites in the western U.S. Throughout the 1920s, the Pantages Circuit dominated the vaudeville and motion picture market in North America west of the Mississippi River. Pantages was effectively blocked from expansion into the eastern market by New York-based Keith-Albee-Orpheum (KAO).

In the late 1920s, with the looming advent of talking pictures, David Sarnoff, the principal of the Radio Corporation of America (RCA), which held a number of patents in film/sound technology, established the film production company Radio Pictures, in which Joseph P. Kennedy held an option and a managing interest, and moved to acquire control of the KAO theatres through quiet purchases of the company's stock. In 1927, Kennedy and Sarnoff were successful in gaining control of KAO and, in 1928, changed the name of the company to Radio Keith Orpheum (RKO). They then approached Alexander Pantages with an offer to purchase his entire chain. Pantages rejected the offer.

== Rape trial ==
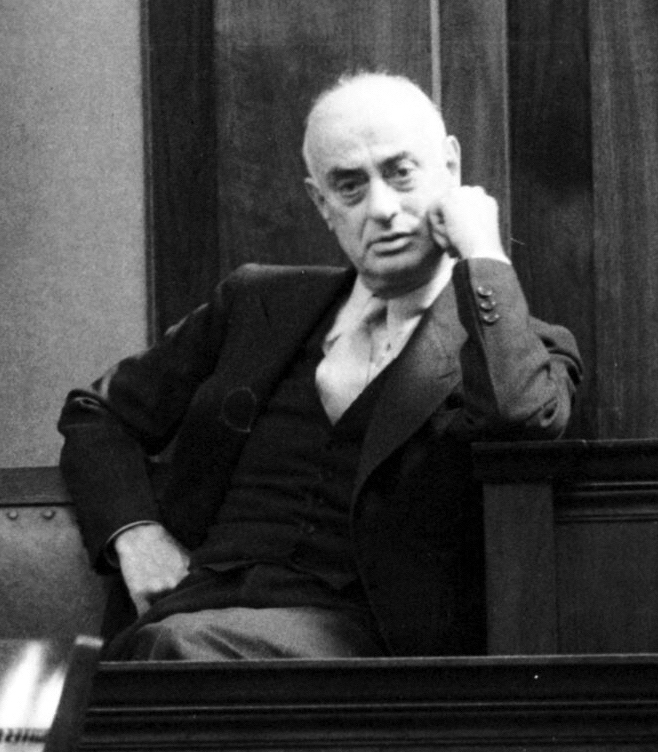
Pantages testifying during his first trial, 1929

In the midst of the Wall Street crash of 1929, Pantages was arrested and charged with the rape of 17-year-old California-born Eunice Pringle. Pringle, an aspiring vaudeville dancer, alleged that Pantages had attacked her in a small office at his downtown Los Angeles theatre after she met with him to discuss an audition.

Newspaper coverage of the trial, particularly by William Randolph Hearst's Los Angeles Examiner, was strongly antagonistic towards the Greek-accented Pantages while portraying Pringle as an innocent victim. Both before and during the trial, stories in the Examiner portrayed Pantages as alone, aloof, cold, emotionless, effete, and "European", while the American-born Pringle was humanized through portraits with her family, emotional outbursts in court and interviews in the press. Pantages granted no interviews during the trial.

On October 27, 1929, Pantages was convicted and sentenced to 50 years in prison. He was subsequently jailed for several months. Pantages engaged attorneys Jerry Giesler and San Francisco lawyer Jake Ehrlich to file an appeal on his behalf. Giesler successfully petitioned for a new trial with the California Supreme Court, basing his argument on the original trial judge's exclusion of testimony relating to Eunice Pringle's moral character.

Pantages was acquitted in the second trial in 1931, after Giesler portrayed Pringle as a woman of low morals; he also demonstrated that a rape would have been impractical in Pantages's broom closet and suggested to the court that Pringle should have been able to fight off the 5' 6.5", 126 lb., 62-year-old Pantages.

== Post-trial years ==
Although Pantages was acquitted, the trials ruined him financially. He sold the theatre chain to RKO for a lower sum than that originally offered—far less than what his "Pantages Greek" vaudeville palaces had cost him to build—and went into retirement. Pantages died in 1936 and was interred in the Great Mausoleum, Sanctuary of Benediction, at Forest Lawn Memorial Park in Glendale, California.

The rumour, begun at the second trial, that RKO and Kennedy paid Eunice Pringle to frame Alexander Pantages, was revived in Ronald Kessler's 1997 biography of Joseph P. Kennedy Sr. titled The Sins of the Father: Joseph P. Kennedy and the Dynasty He Founded. The alleged conspiracy against Pantages also plays a prominent role in the book Hollywood and the Mob by Tim Adler.

Pantages was the grandfather of actors John Considine III and Tim Considine via his daughter Carmen who married John Considine Jr.

== Fictional representation ==
Paul Porcasi portrayed George Apolinaris, a short, heavily accented Greek owner of a chain of movie theaters, in the 1933 Busby Berkeley musical Footlight Parade.

== See also ==
- Pantages Theatre
- Pantages Tower in Toronto, Canada
