= Peephole Cinema =

Network of micro-cinemas in the United States

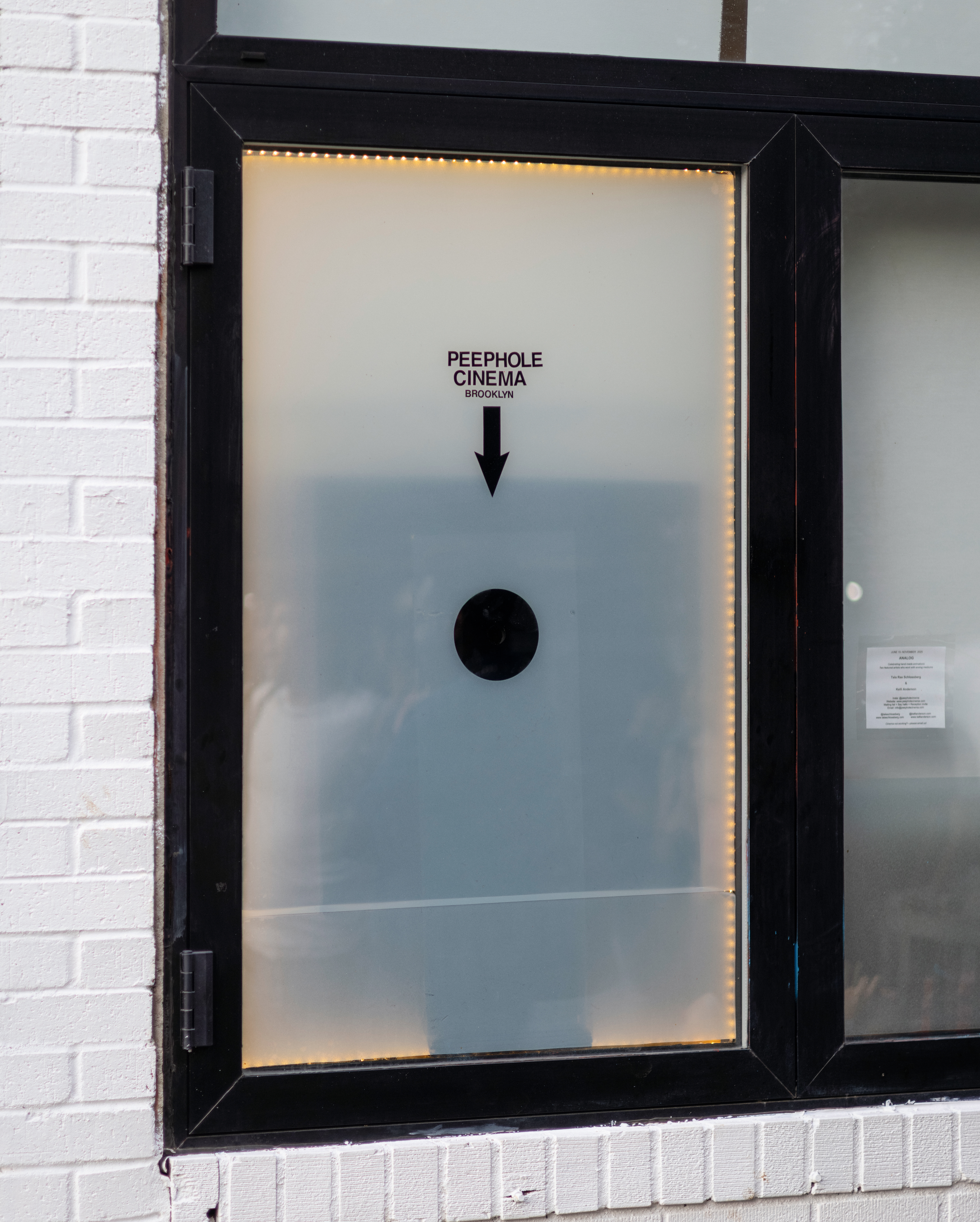
- Peephole Cinema installation at 97 Wilson Avenue, Brooklyn
- Industry: Public art, Artist-run initiative
- Genre: Microcinema, single-viewer installation
- Founded: December 2013; 11 years ago in San Francisco, California
- Founder: Laurie O’Brien
- Website: www.peepholecinema.com

Peephole Cinema is a network of single-viewer microcinemas that present short, silent films through peepholes installed in exterior walls. The project was founded in San Francisco in 2013 by animator Laurie O'Brien. Peephole Cinema later expanded to Brooklyn, New York, and Los Angeles, California. The project functions as a public art installation, offering continuous, free access to experimental moving image works on a 24-hour basis.

== History and locations ==
=== San Francisco ===
The first Peephole Cinema was installed in 2013 in a residential alley in San Francisco's Mission District, embedded in the wall of Laurie O’Brien's home. This site operated continuously until 2020 and reopened in 2025.

In 2016, the San Francisco Arts Commission commissioned a temporary installation at San Francisco International Airport (SFO). Titled To Travel is to Live, this project was situated in Terminal 1 and featured a curated program of silent short films focused on themes of travel and transience.

=== Los Angeles ===
In 2014, a second permanent installation was established in Los Angeles, in collaboration with Automata, a nonprofit arts organization. Located in Chinatown, this iteration continues to operate as of 2025. The Los Angeles site emphasizes experimental animation, avant-garde short films, and interdisciplinary media works.

=== New York ===
Peephole Cinema expanded to Brooklyn, New York City, in 2014 with an initial installation at UnionDocs in Williamsburg. In 2018, a more permanent site was established in Bushwick at 97 Wilson Avenue. The Bushwick location operated continuously until 2020, after which it was temporarily closed, resuming operations in 2025. Programs at the Brooklyn site have involved collaborations with organizations such as GIPHY Arts and Knockdown Center.

== Programming ==
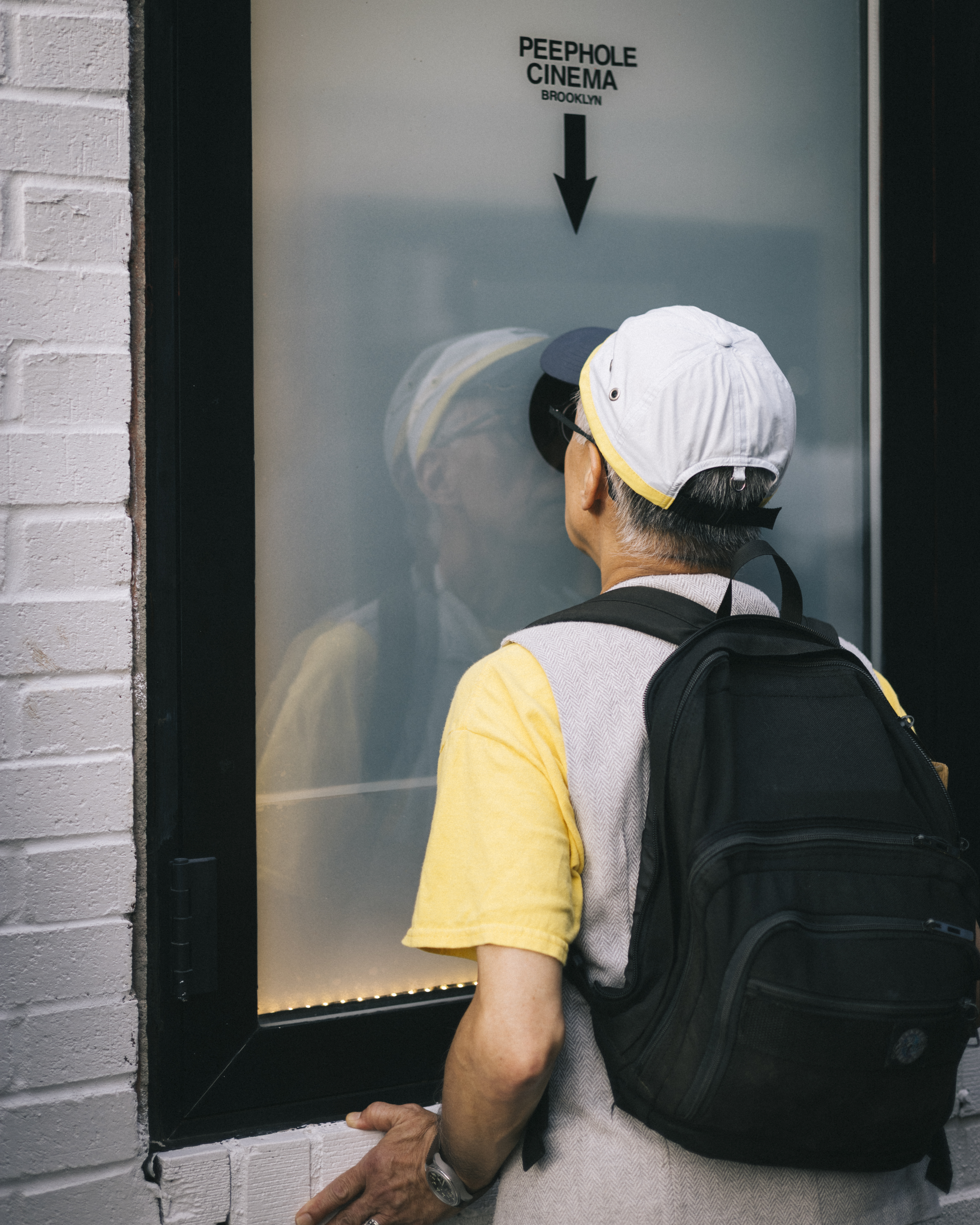
A person peers into Cinema Peephole's Bushwick location.

All Peephole Cinema sites adhere to a curatorial model that emphasizes silent, ultra-short-form works suitable for endless repetition. The works are typically experimental animations, video art, or abstract visual compositions rather than narrative films. Programming cycles are often organized thematically. While each site operates autonomously, guest curators and local artists are routinely engaged to assemble new programs.

== Reception ==
Peephole Cinema has been the subject of coverage in both regional and national media for its approach to public art and microcinema exhibition. The San Francisco Chronicle described the first San Francisco installation as "cinema in its original form," noting its connection to 19th-century peep shows and the Kinetoscope. Coverage from KQED and Hyperallergic has characterized the project as an inventive form of public art that transforms overlooked urban spaces into venues for experimental film.

The Bushwick location has been described by Untapped New York as "New York City's smallest theater."

== See also ==
- Microcinema
- Kinetoscope
- Spectacle Theater
