= Pantages Theatre (Vancouver) =

Former theatre in British Columbia, Canada

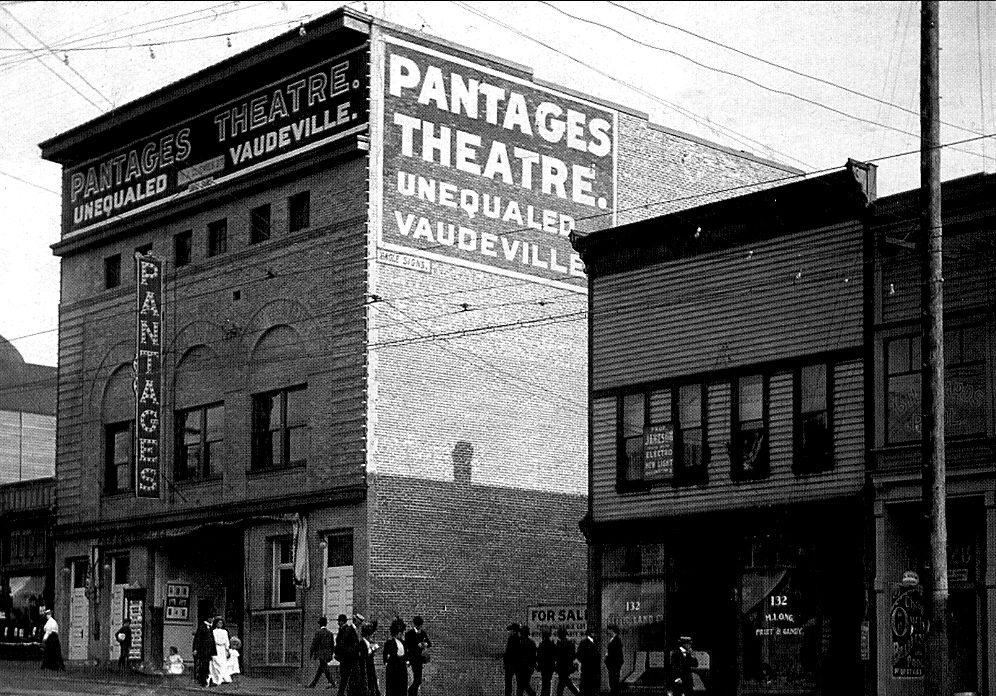
- The Pantages Theatre circa 1912

General information
- Type: Theatre
- Location: 144-156 East Hastings St., Vancouver, British Columbia, Canada
- Coordinates: 49.2811°N 123.1012°W
- Current tenants: Worthington Properties
- Completed: 1907
- Inaugurated: 1908
- Demolished: 2011
- Owner: Alexander Pantages

Design and construction
- Architect: Edward Evans Blackmore
- Other designers: B. Marcus Priteca

The Pantages Theatre was a vaudeville and film theatre in Vancouver, British Columbia, Canada, located in the Downtown Eastside neighbourhood. Opened in 1907, it later became a film theatre. Vacant after 1994, its roof collapsed and it was demolished in 2011. It was considered the oldest remaining vaudeville theatre in Western Canada. The building was demolished along with others on the street to build the Sequel 138 housing complex.

It was built by Alexander Pantages in 1907. The Pantages was converted in the 1920s to a movie house and operated under several names during its lifetime, among them the Royal, State, Queen, Avon and City Nights. It was a Chinese-language theatre named Sun Sing until it closed in 1994. It was left vacant until its demolition.

The Pantages was listed on Heritage Canada's 2009 Top Ten Most Endangered Places List and the Vancouver Heritage Register as a heritage building. On 30 September 2008, Vancouver City Council refused the proposal to restore the 650-seat Pantages Theatre, and similarly refused the blackbox studio, art gallery, and 136 units of housing associated with the venture. After that, the entire half block was put up for sale. After the City of Vancouver rejected the renewal proposal, the roof of the building collapsed due to the weight of years of water collection. The Sequel 138 residential project of 76 condominium units and 18 social housing rental units was built on the site.

A second Pantages Theatre was constructed in the same area at 20 West Hastings Street, beginning in 1914 but not finished until sometime between 1917 and 1918 due to World War I. It was also known as the Beacon, the Odeon Hastings and finally as the Majestic. It was demolished in 1967 and replaced by a parking lot.

== See also ==
- List of heritage buildings in Vancouver
