= Roxie Theatre =

Historic movie theater in Los Angeles

- U.S. Historic district – Contributing property
- Los Angeles Historic-Cultural Monument
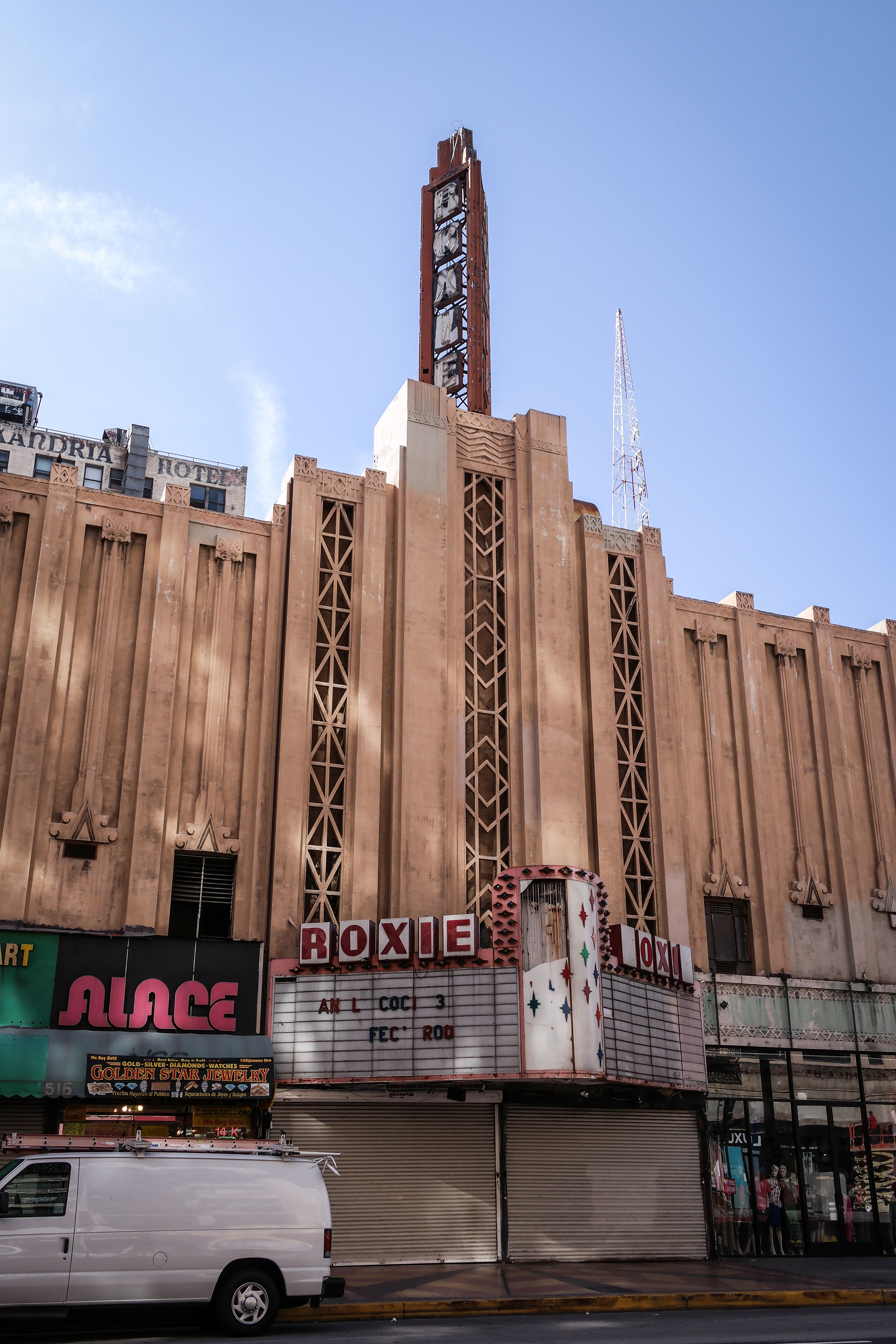
- The building in 2014

- Location within the Los Angeles metropolitan area
- Location: 518 S. Broadway, Los Angeles, California
- Coordinates: 34.0476°N 118.2509°W
- Built: 1931
- Architect: John M. Cooper
- Architectural style: Art Deco
- Part of: Broadway Theater and Commercial District (ID79000484)
- LAHCM No.: 526

Significant dates
- Designated CP: May 9, 1979
- Designated LAHCM: March 20, 1991

Roxie Theatre is a historic former movie theater in the Broadway Theater District of Los Angeles, California. The venue opened in 1931 as the last theater to be built on Broadway. Architect John M. Cooper's Art Deco design of the Roxie remained the only theater of that style in the downtown neighborhood. In 1978, Metropolitan Theatres converted the space into a Spanish-language filmhouse. Following the Roxie's closure in 1989, the lobby was converted into retail space whereas the auditorium was left intact.

== History ==
The site of the Roxie previously hosted Quinn's Superba Theatre from 1914 to 1922 and a coffee shop from 1923 to 1931. The prior building was razed and replaced by architect John M. Cooper's design, making the Roxie the last theater to be built on Broadway and the only one in the downtown section of the city built in the Art Deco style. Construction began in June 1931 at a cost of ($2.12 million in 2025). The J. M. Cooper Company served as the general contractor. The Roxie opened on November 25, 1931, with screenings of Honor of the Family and the Laurel and Hardy film Come Clean.

On August 4, 1943, 37-year-old Roxie Theatre manager Harry R. Metzger died of a heart attack while operating the box office. On December 24, 1954, a woman committed suicide in the Roxie auditorium during a showtime. Authorities were unable to identify the body but noted that the woman had a Canadian dollar and a receipt from a cafe. On June 27, 1958, Roxie usher Richard A. Studeny held theater manager Robert Brandtjen at gunpoint and fled with $1,200. Studeny turned himself in to police in Florida in December 1958.

On January 29, 1978, Metropolitan Theatres converted the Roxie programming to Spanish-language films. The Roxie Theatre permanently closed in the summer of 1989. The auditorium was left intact while the lobby was converted into retail space. In the years since the theater's closure, the auditorium has fallen into disrepair, including water damage.

== Architecture ==
Architect John M. Cooper designed the Roxie Theatre in the Art Deco style. The facade prominently features a central stepped gable with a vertical sign tower spelling "Roxie" atop it, as well as chevrons and other geometric forms. A colorful terrazzo design on the ground of the building's entrance gained particular notoriety.

Cooper designed the 1,600-seat auditorium in a long, narrow orientation to optimize amplified sound. Although the Roxie was purpose-built for movies, the theater house features a small stage, rigging, and a proscenium arch for live productions.

The Roxie's grandiose design required over 35 miles (56 km) of electrical wire for its lighting system, 15,000 pounds (6,800 kg) of sheet metal, and 120,000 bags of cement. The theater also included a 31-motor ventilation system.

== See also ==
- List of Los Angeles Historic-Cultural Monuments in Downtown Los Angeles
- List of contributing properties in the Broadway Theater and Commercial District
