= List of Art Deco architecture in California =

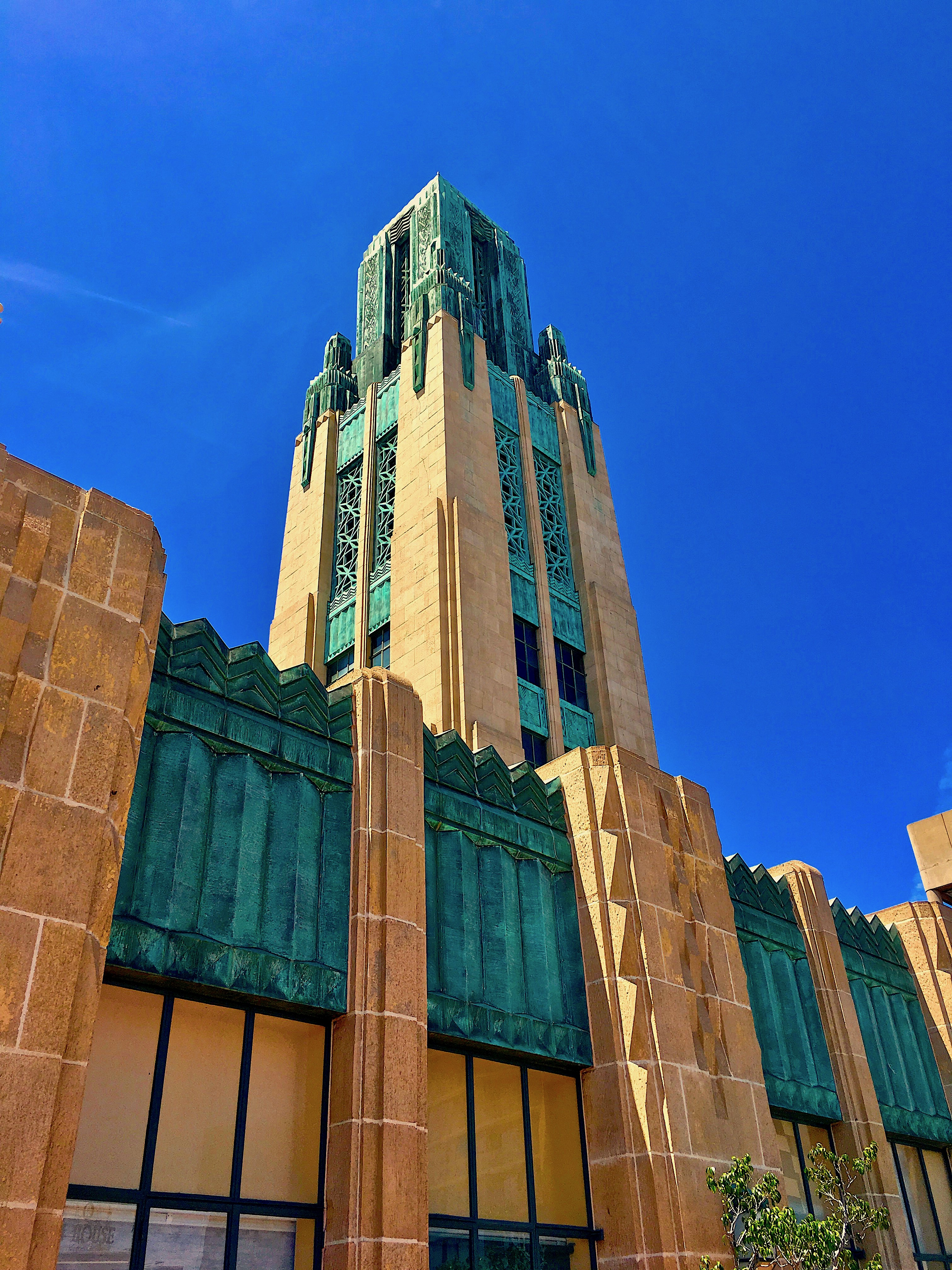
Bullocks Wilshire, Los Angeles

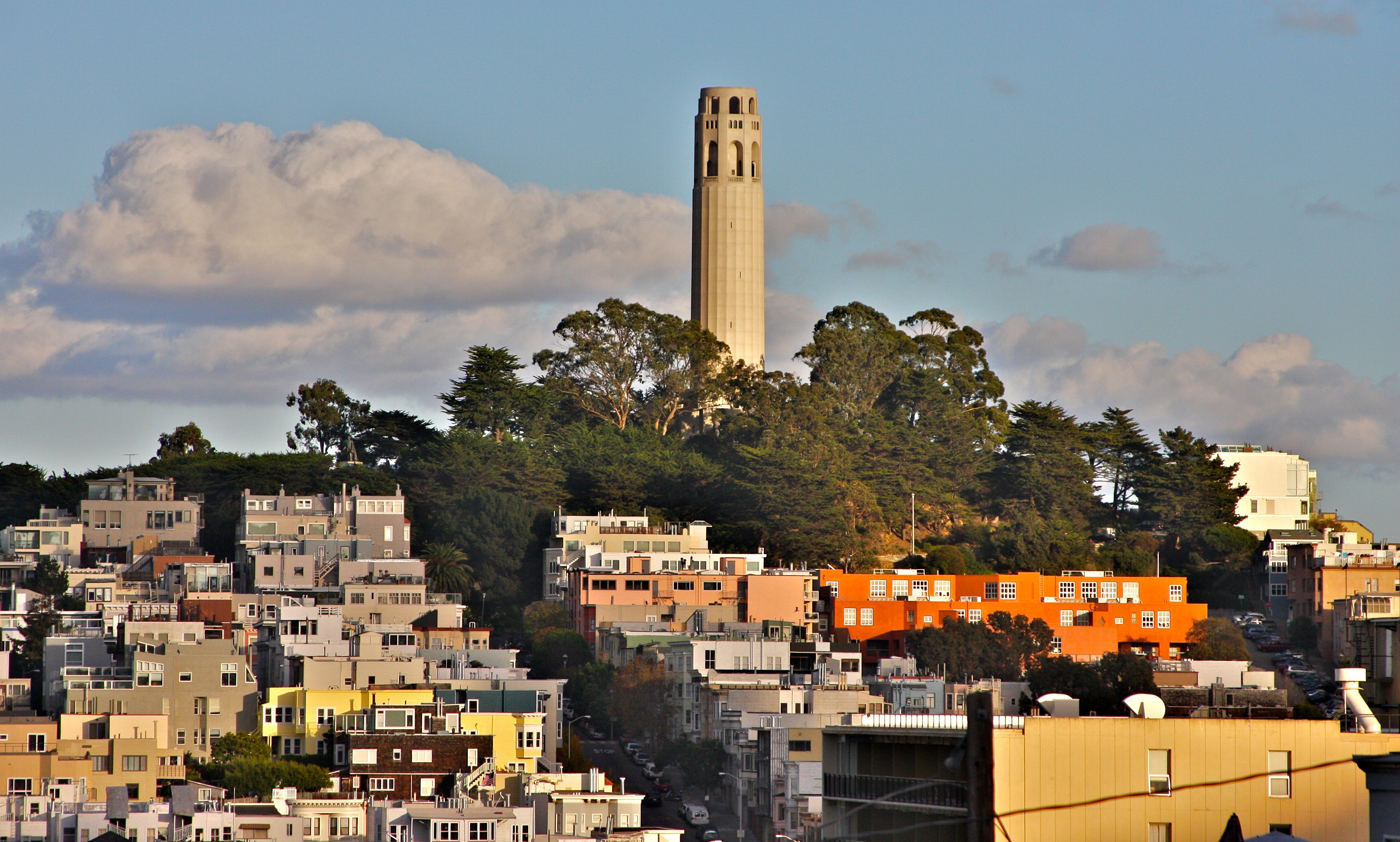
Coit Tower, San Francisco

There are multiple examples of buildings in the Art Deco architectural style located in various parts of California, United States.

== Auburn ==
- Auburn City Hall and Fire House, 1937
- Auburn Placer Performing Arts Center, 1930
- Earl Crabbe Gymnasium, 1937

== Bakersfield ==
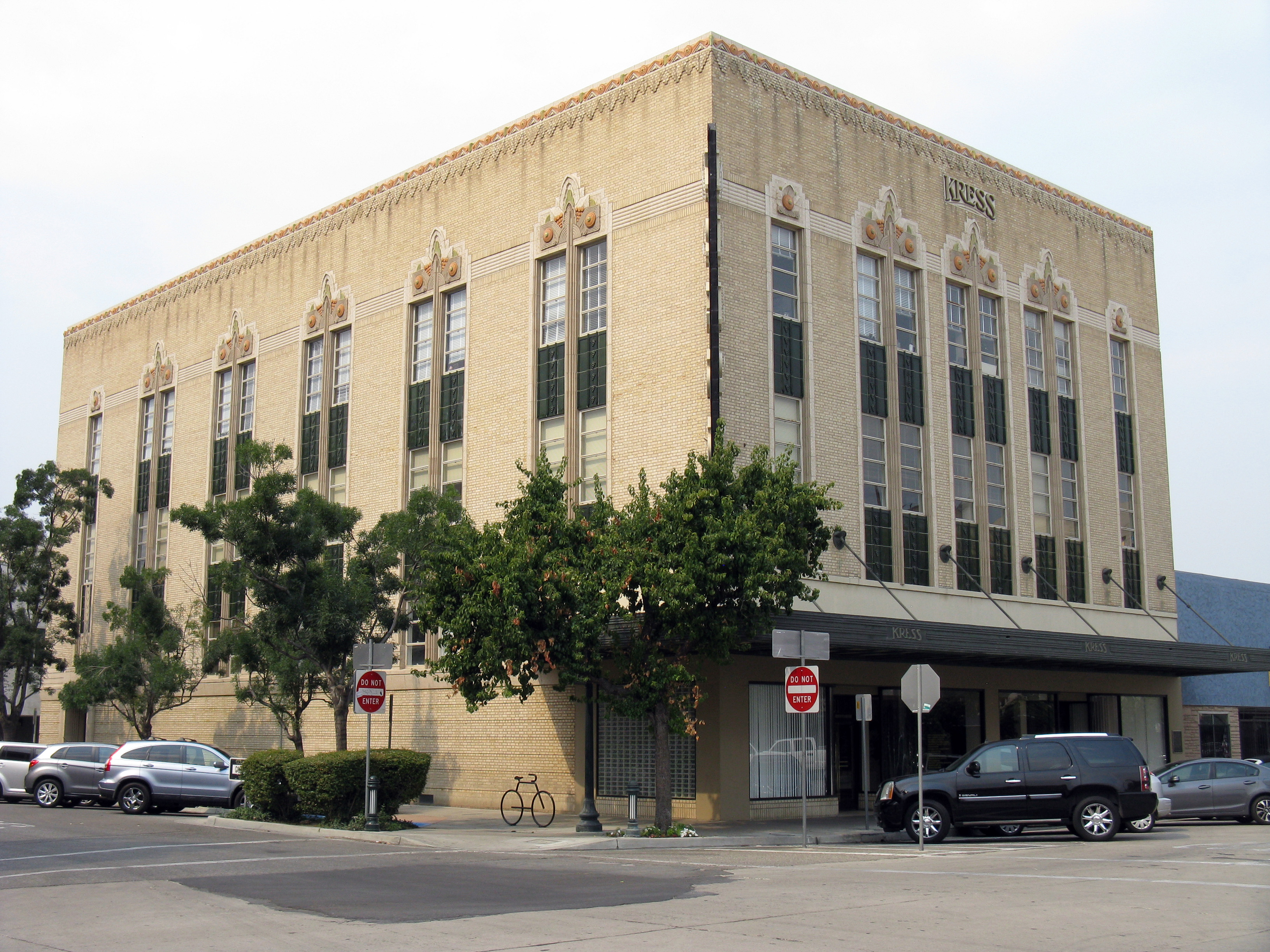
Kress Building

- Central Fire Station, 1939
- Fox Theater, 1930
- Kern County Hall of Records, 1939
- Kress Building
- Standard School Auditorium, 1937

== Berkeley ==
- 82 Shattuck Square, 1926
- Berkeley Community Theatre,, 1950
- Berkeley Iceland, 1940
- Berkeley Public Library
- Edwards Stadium, 1932
- Pacific Film Archive, 1939

== Beverly Hills ==
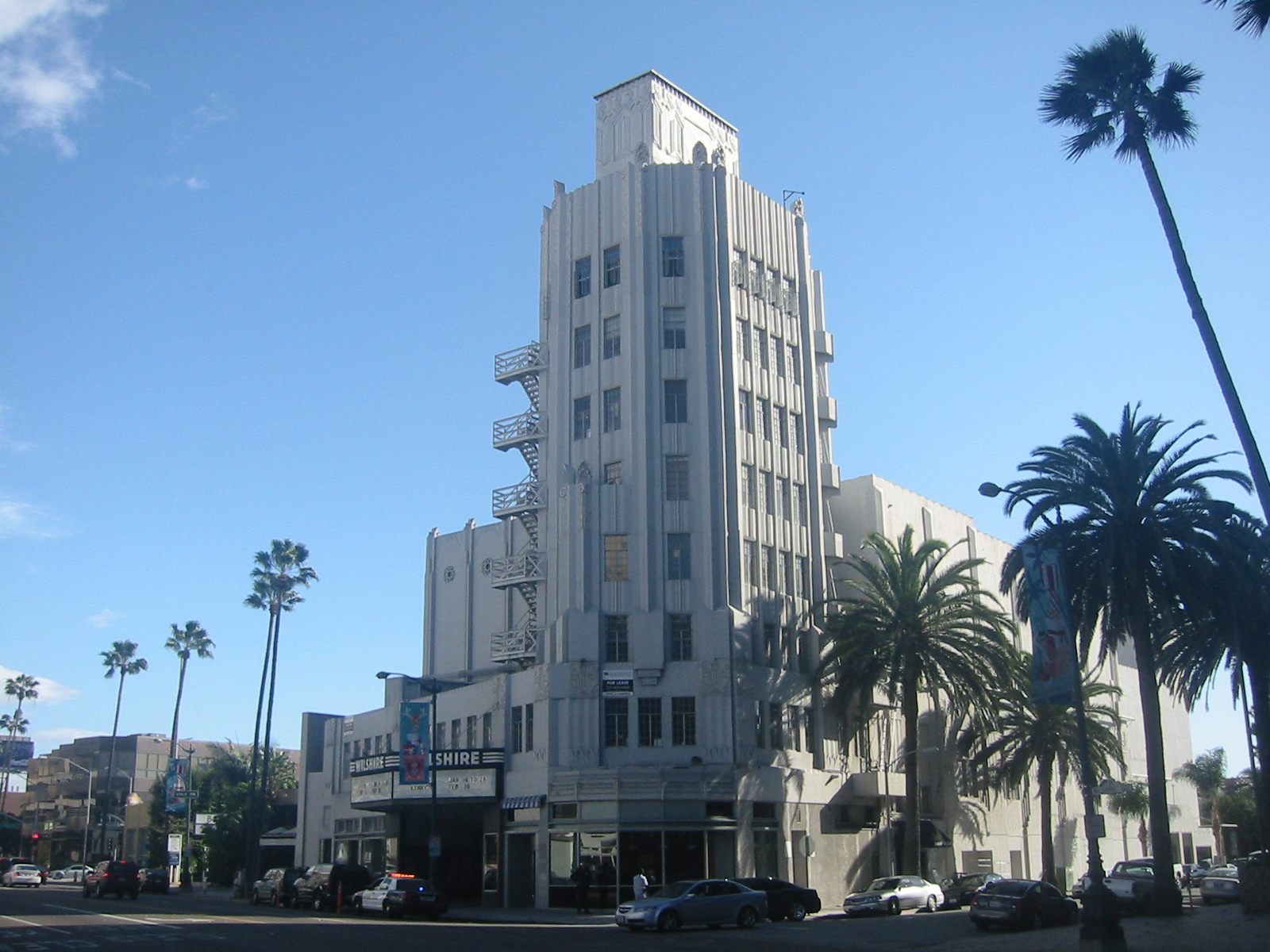
Saban Theatre

- Advance Company Building, 1929
- Fine Arts Theatre, 1937
- Payne Building, 1926 and 1936
- Saban Theatre, 1930
- Sterling Plaza, 1929

== Culver City ==
- Allied Model Trains, 1946
- Beacon Laundry, 1931
- Citizen Publishing Company Building, 1929
- Helms Bakery Building, 1930
- United States Post Office, 1940

== Fresno ==
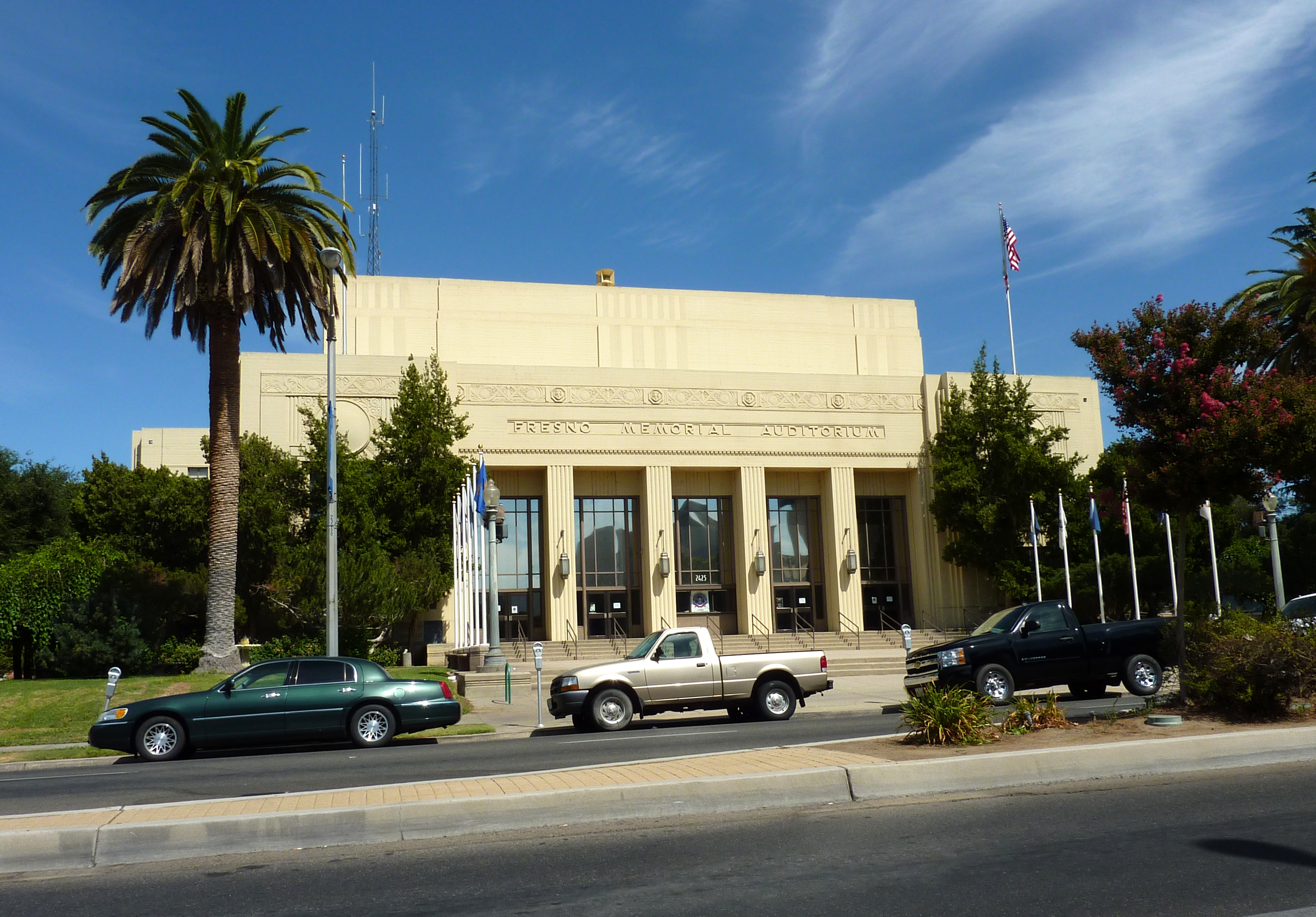
Fresno Memorial Auditorium

- Azteca Theater, 1948
- Crest Theater, 1949
- Fresno County Hall of Records, 1937
- Fresno Memorial Auditorium, 1936
- Fresno Unified School District Administration Building, 1936
- Gottschalks Department Store, 1914
- L. C. Wesley Super Garage, 1931
- Mayfair Shopping Center Ivory Tower, 1945
- Scottish Rite Masonic Temple, 1937
- Tower Theatre, 1939
- United States Post Office Fresno, 1939

== Glendale ==
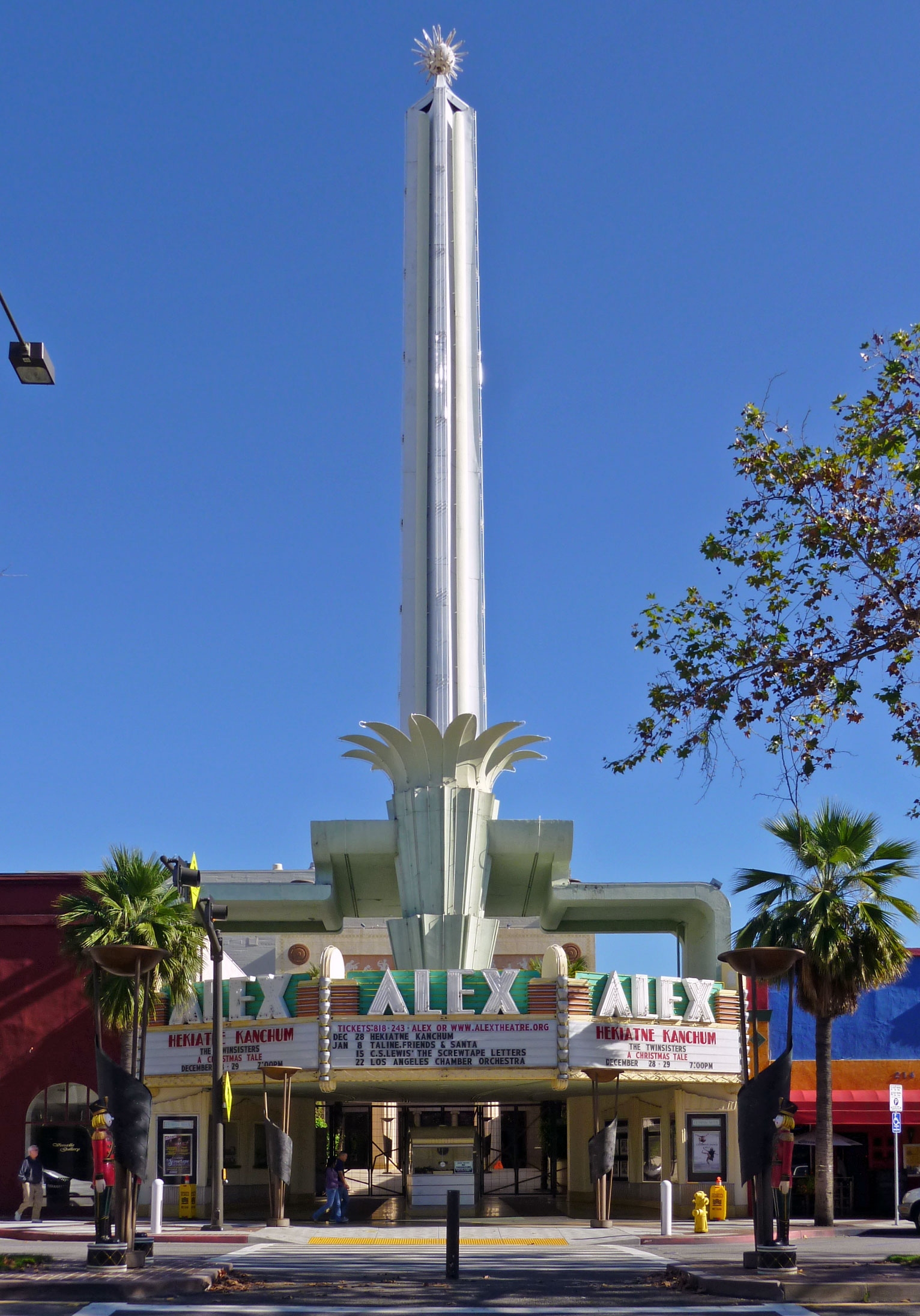
Alex Theatre

- Aeroscopic Environmental Inc. Building, 1935
- Alex Theatre, 1925
- Galilee Mission Center, 1930s
- Glendale City Hall, 1942
- Grand Central Airport, 1923
- Incarnation Catholic School and Church, 1937 and 1952
- North Glendale Methodist Church, 1941

== Huntington Park ==
- Lane-Wells Company Building, 1939
- W. W. Henry Company Building, 1939
- Warner Huntington Park, 1930

== Inglewood ==
- Academy Theatre, 1939
- Fox Theatre Inglewood, 1949
- Inglewood Memorial Park, 1933
- United States Post Office Inglewood

== Long Beach ==
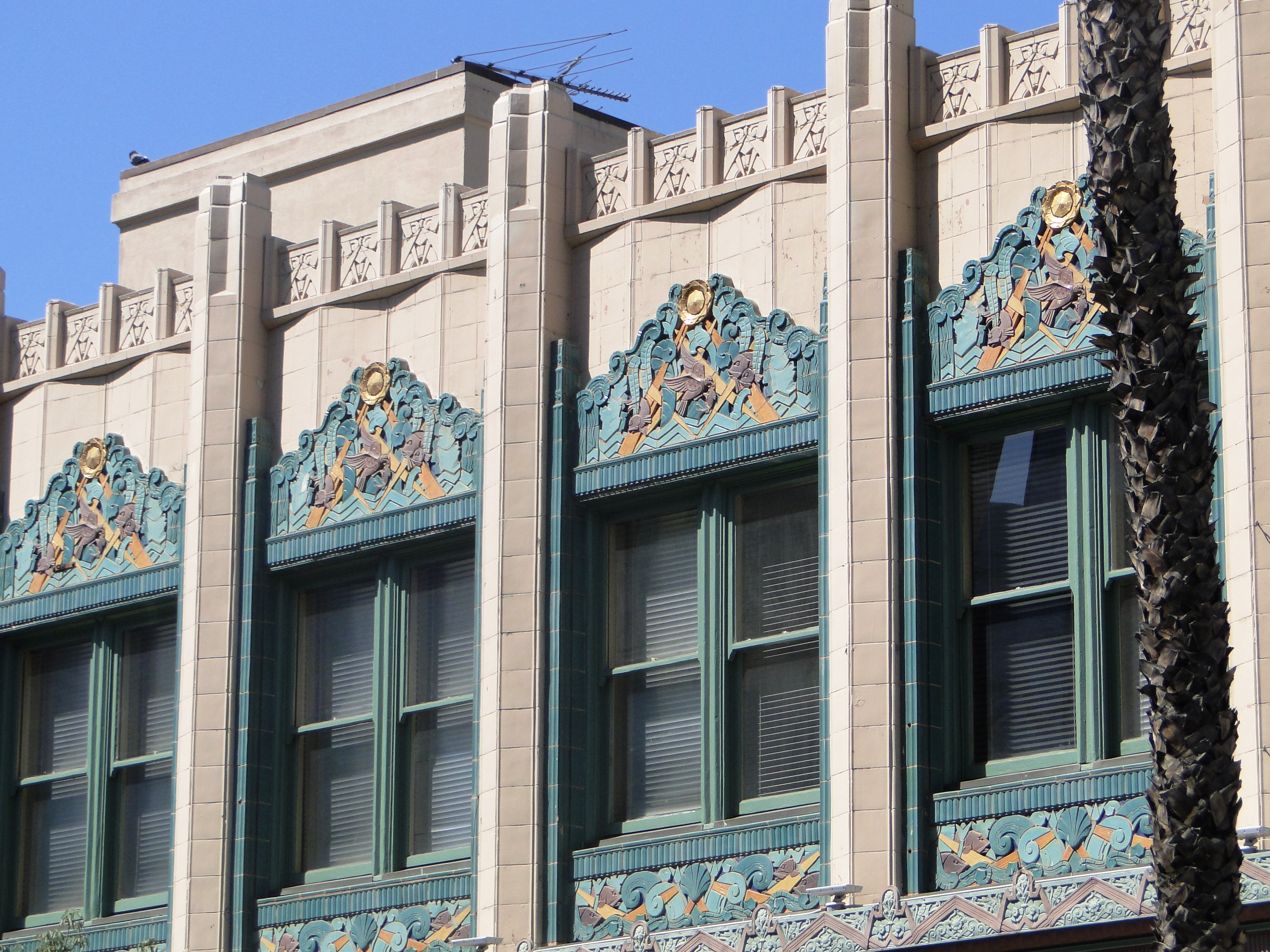
Dr. Rowan Building

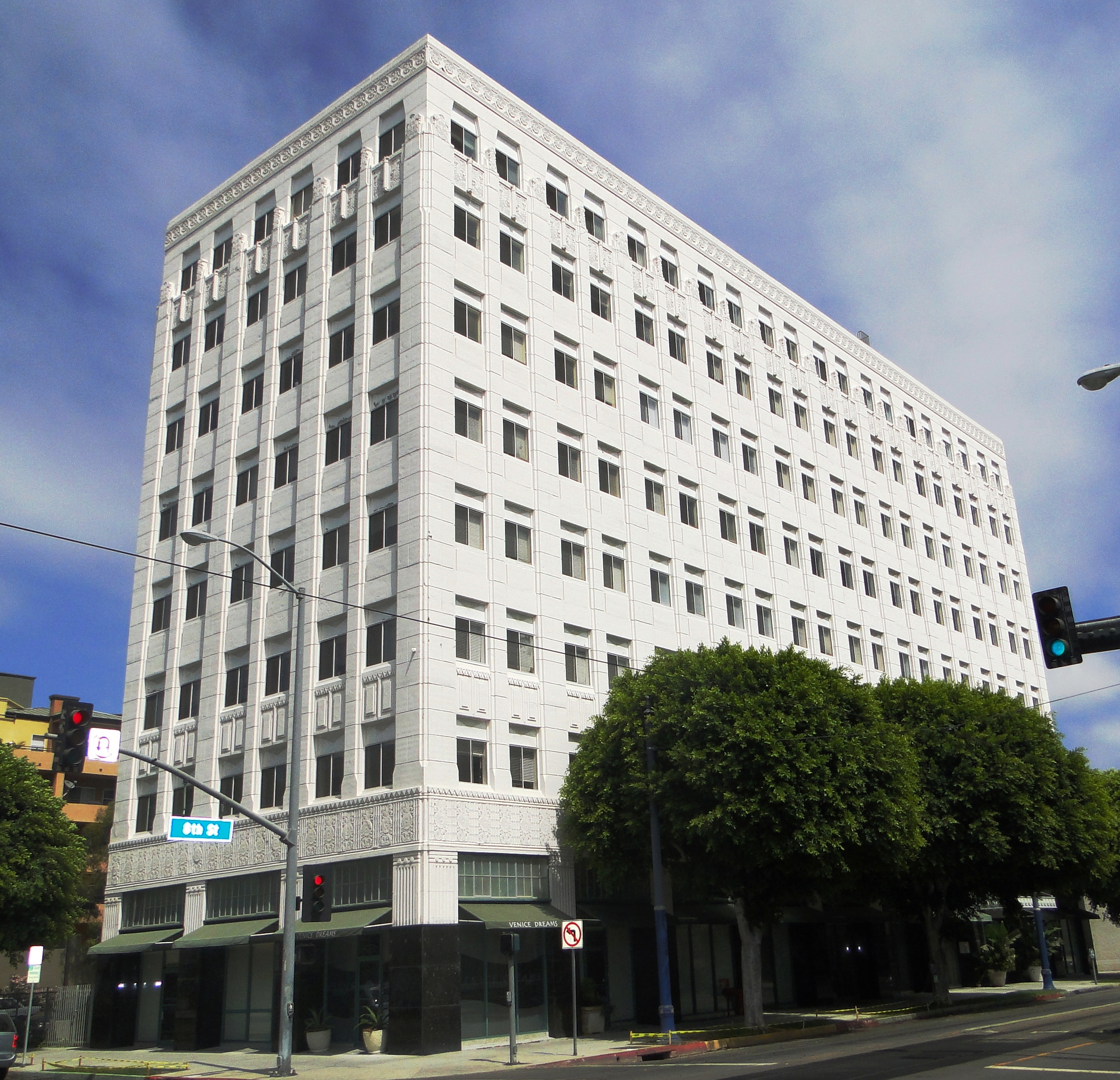
Long Beach Professional Building

- 1862 Atlantic Avenue, 1930
- Atlantic Studio, 1933
- Barker Brothers Building, 1929
- Buffums' Autoport, 1941
- Dr. Rowan Building, 1930
- Lafayette Hotel, 1929
- Long Beach Airport, 1923
- Long Beach Polytechnic High School Auditorium, 1935
- Long Beach Professional Building, 1929
- Long Beach Skating House, 1929
- Marvin Apartments, 1930
- Merrill Building, 1921
- Municipal Utilities Building, 1932
- RMS Queen Mary, 1936
- Siam Market, 1930
- Soft Water Laundry, 1920s
- Thrifty Drug/Famous Department Store, 1929
- Tichenor Orthopedic Clinic for Children, 1938
- United States Post Office Long Beach Main, 1934
- Walkers Department Store, 1929
- Wiese & Wiese Building, 1929

== Los Angeles ==
=== Downtown ===
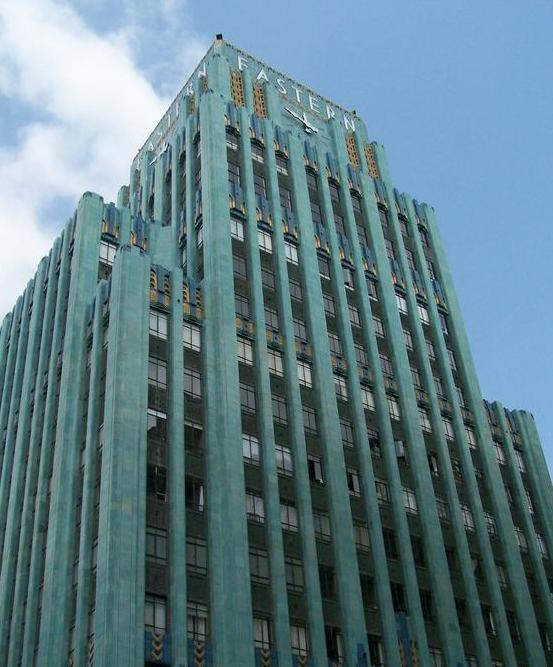
Eastern Columbia Building

- Central Library, 1926
- City Hall, 1928
- Coca-Cola Building, 1939
- Eastern Columbia Building, 1930
- Federal Reserve Bank of San Francisco, Los Angeles Branch, 1929
- Garfield Building, 1929
- James Oviatt Building, 1927
- Kenneth Hahn Hall of Administration, 1960
- Ninth and Broadway Building, 1929
- Roxie Theatre, 1931
- Southern California Edison Building
- Southern California Gas Company Complex, 1925
- Spring Street Courthouse, 1940
- Sun Realty Company Building, 1930
- Title Guarantee and Trust Company Building, 1930
- Woolworth's Building, 1941

=== Hollywood ===
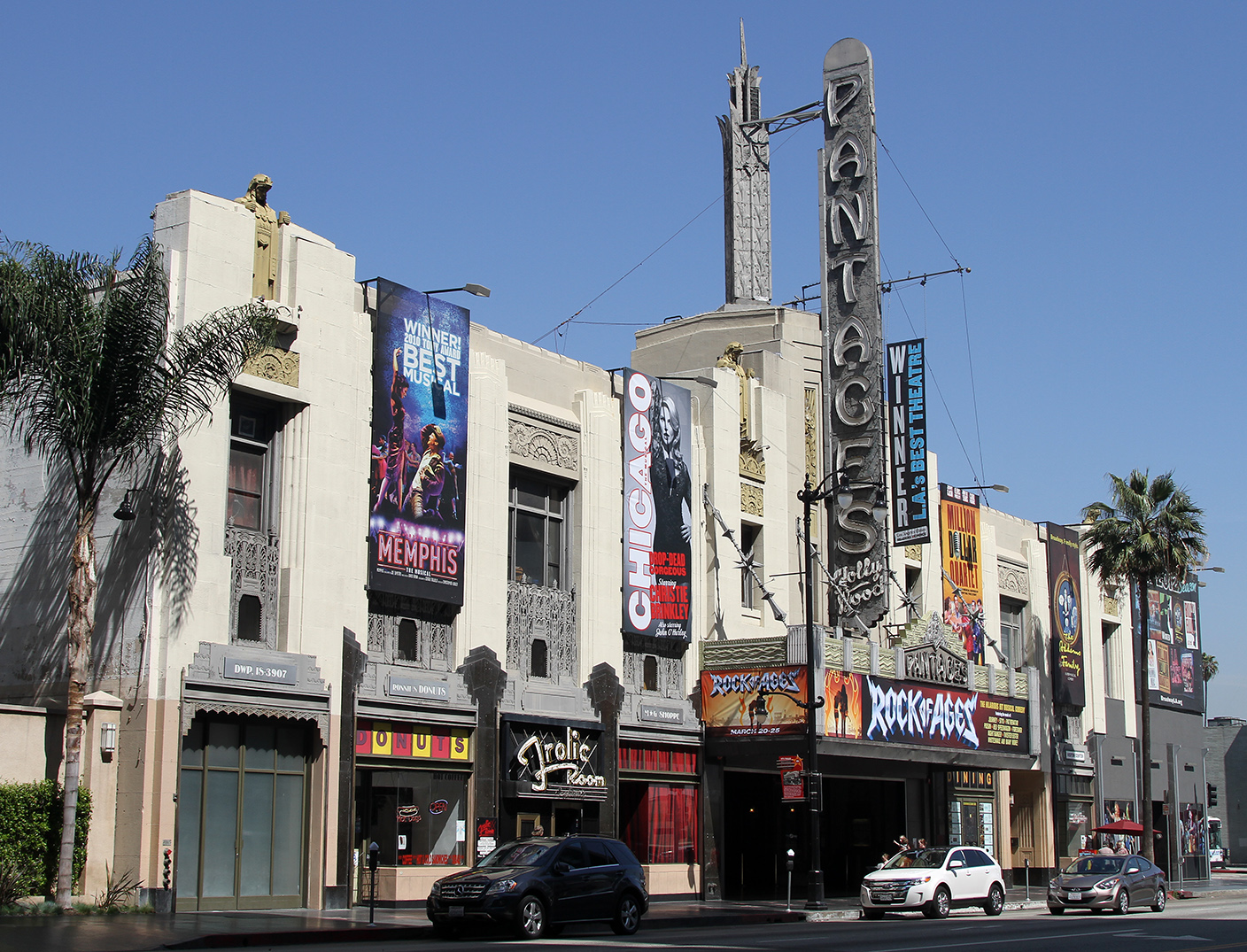
Hollywood Pantages Theater

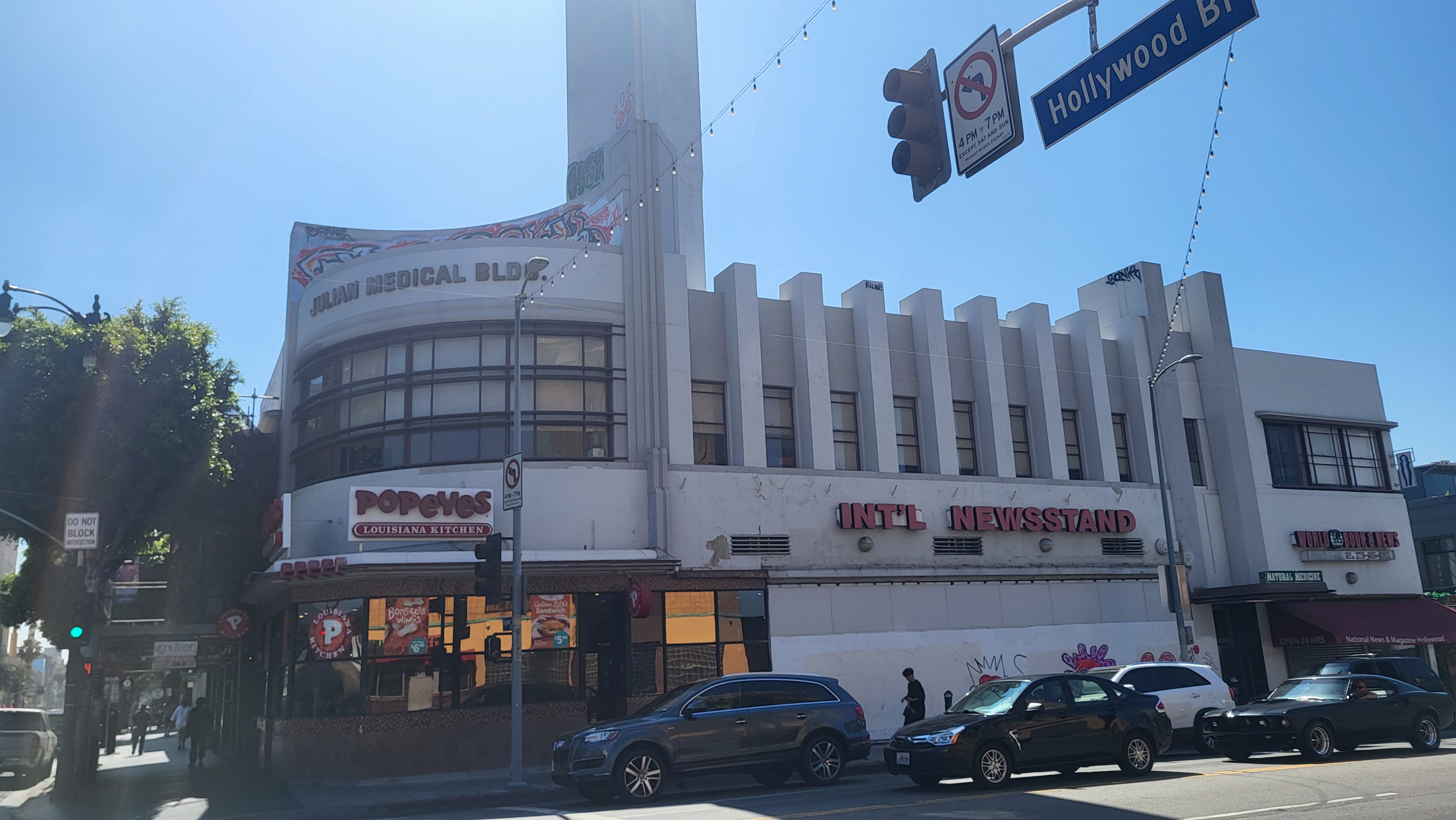
Julian Medical Building

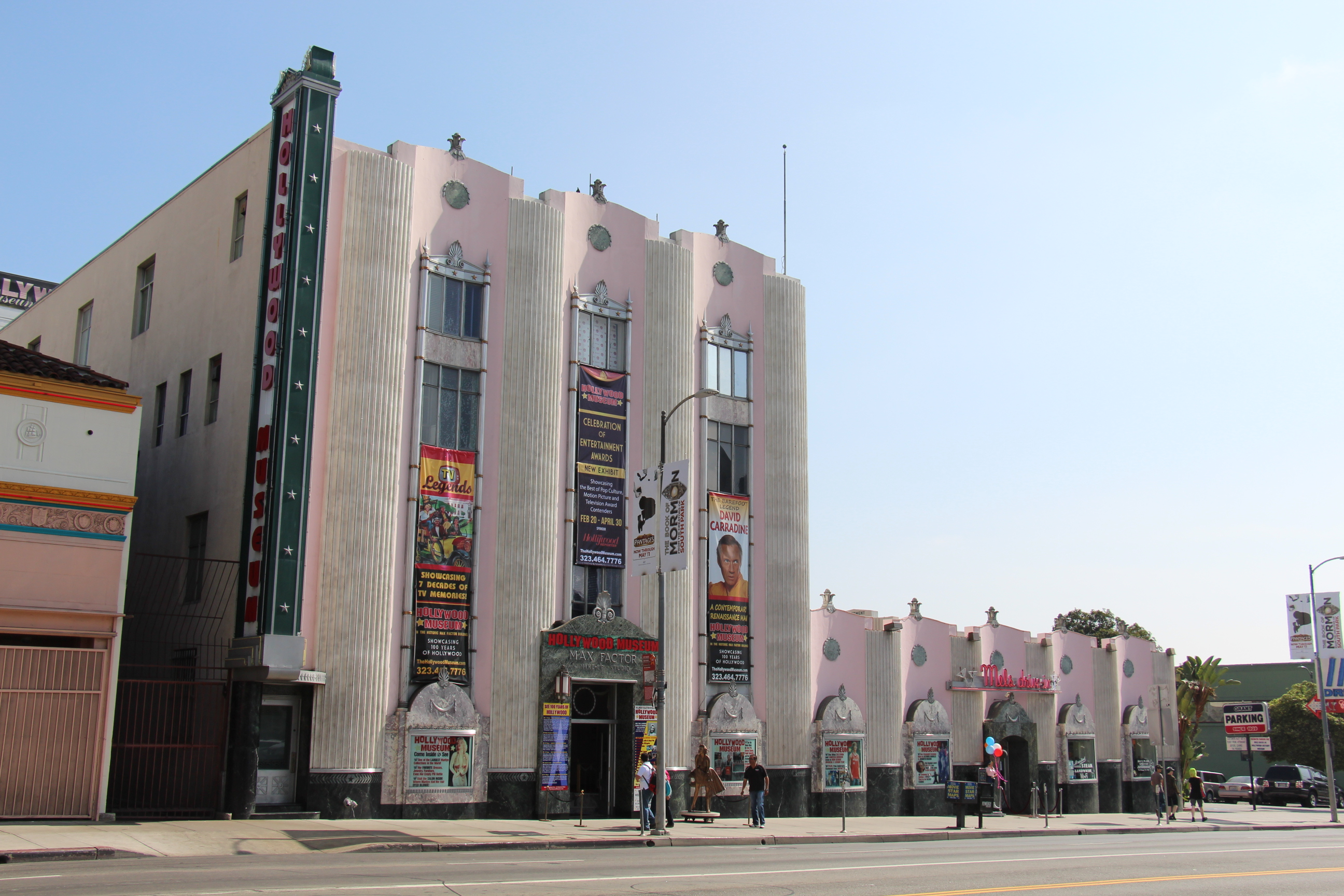
Max Factor Salon

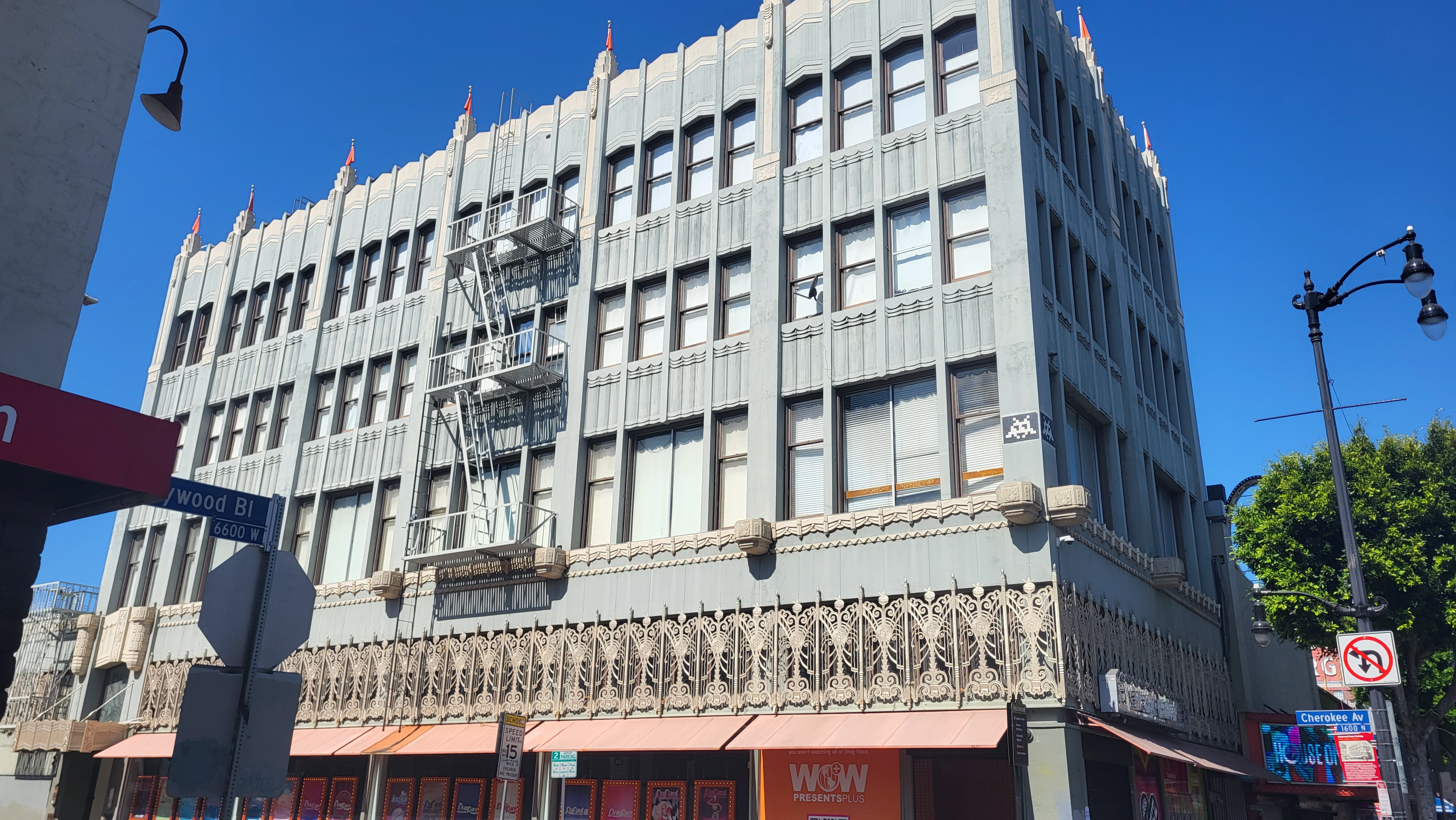
Shane Building

- 6806 Hollywood Boulevard, 1922
- Agfa Ansco Corporation Building, 1937
- American Legion Post 43, 1929
- Attie Building, 1931
- Cedars of Lebanon Hospital, 1930
- Consumer Drug Building, 1938
- Creque Building, 1931 or 1934
- Crossroads of the World, 1936
- Equitable Building of Hollywood, 1931
- Fox Theater, 1934
- Hollywood & Western Building, 1928
- Hollywood Bowl, 1929
- Hollywood Citizen-News Building, 1931
- Hollywood First National, 1928
- Hollywood Palladium, 1940
- Hollywood Pantages Theatre, 1930
- Hollywood Reporter Building, 1924 and 1947
- Hollywood Storage Company Building
- Hollywood Theater, 1936
- J. J. Newberry, 1928
- Julian Medical Building, 1934
- Las Palmas Apartments, 1939
- Lee Drug, 1935
- Mauretania Apartments, 1934
- Max Factor Salon, 1935
- Millers Stationers Building, 1933
- Montecito Apartments, 1930
- The Orient Building, 1937
- Petersen Building, 1929
- Pickford Center for Motion Picture Study, 1948
- Redwine Building, 1931
- Regal Shoes Building, 1939
- S. H. Kress and Co. Building, 1935
- Shane Building, 1930
- Storer House, 1924
- United States Post Office, 1937
- Vine Street Elementary School, 1934
- Wallace Beery Duplex, 1936
- Yucca Vine Tower, 1929

=== Miracle Mile ===
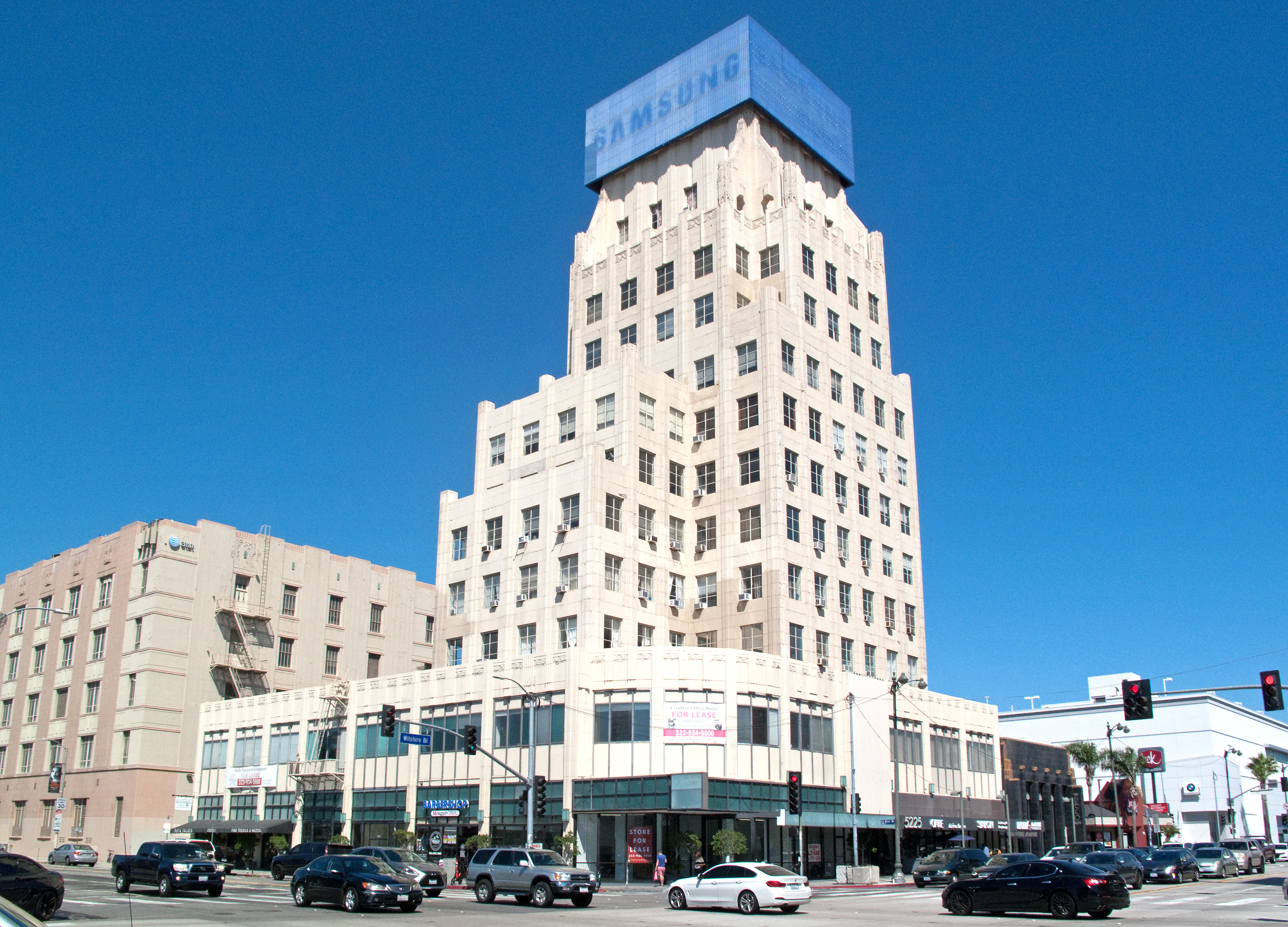
E Clem Wilson Building

- Academy Museum of Motion Pictures, 1940
- Dominguez-Wilshire Building, 1931
- E. Clem Wilson Building, 1929
- El Rey Theatre, 1936
- Firestone Tire and Service Center, 1937

=== San Fernando Valley ===
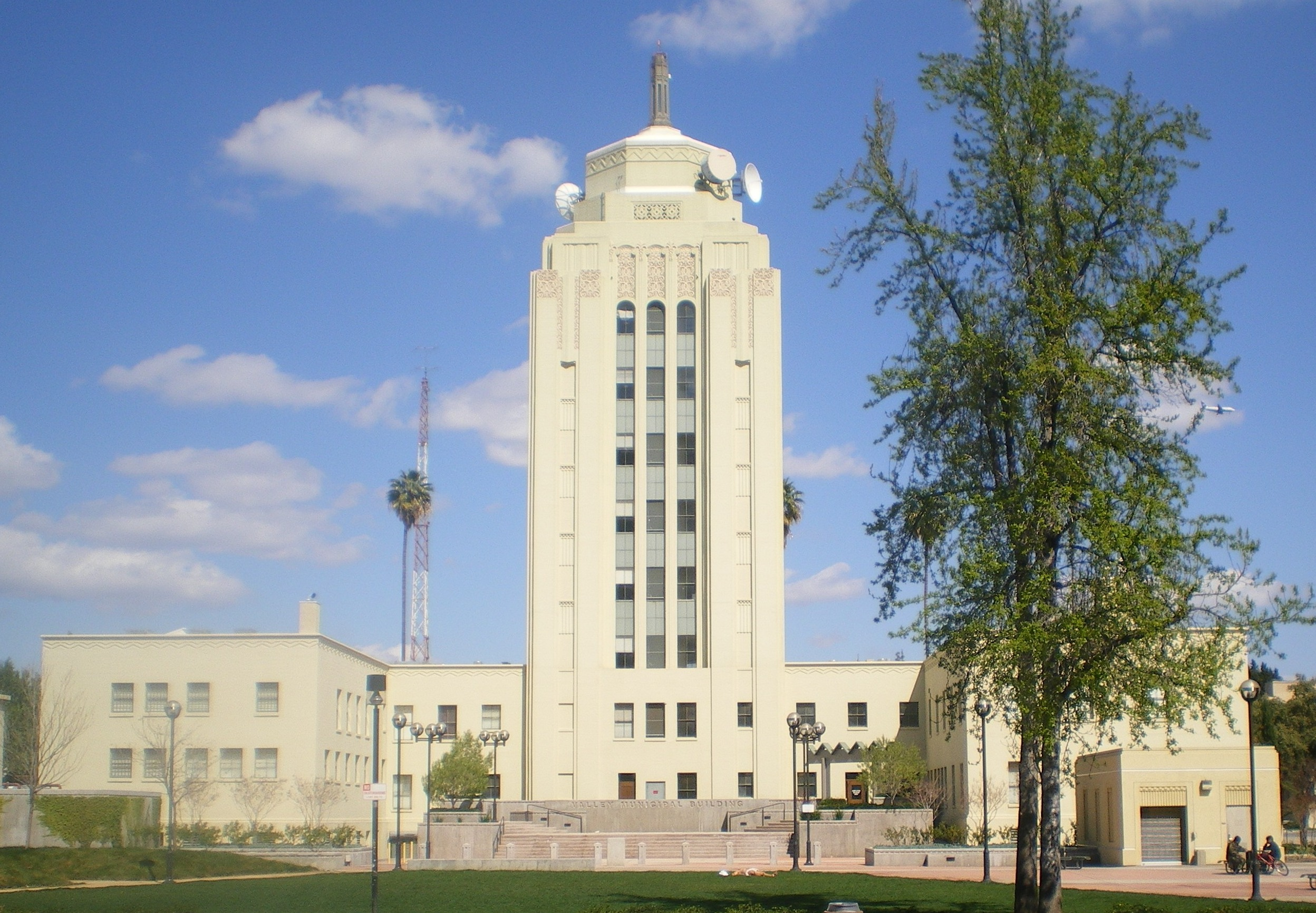
Van Nuys City Hall

- Lankershim Arts Center, 1939
- North Hollywood Masonic Temple, 1949
- Studio City Theater, 1938
- Van Nuys City Hall, 1932

=== San Pedro ===
- Municipal Ferry Building, 1941
- United States Post Office, 1935
- Warner Grand Theatre, 1931

=== Westwood ===
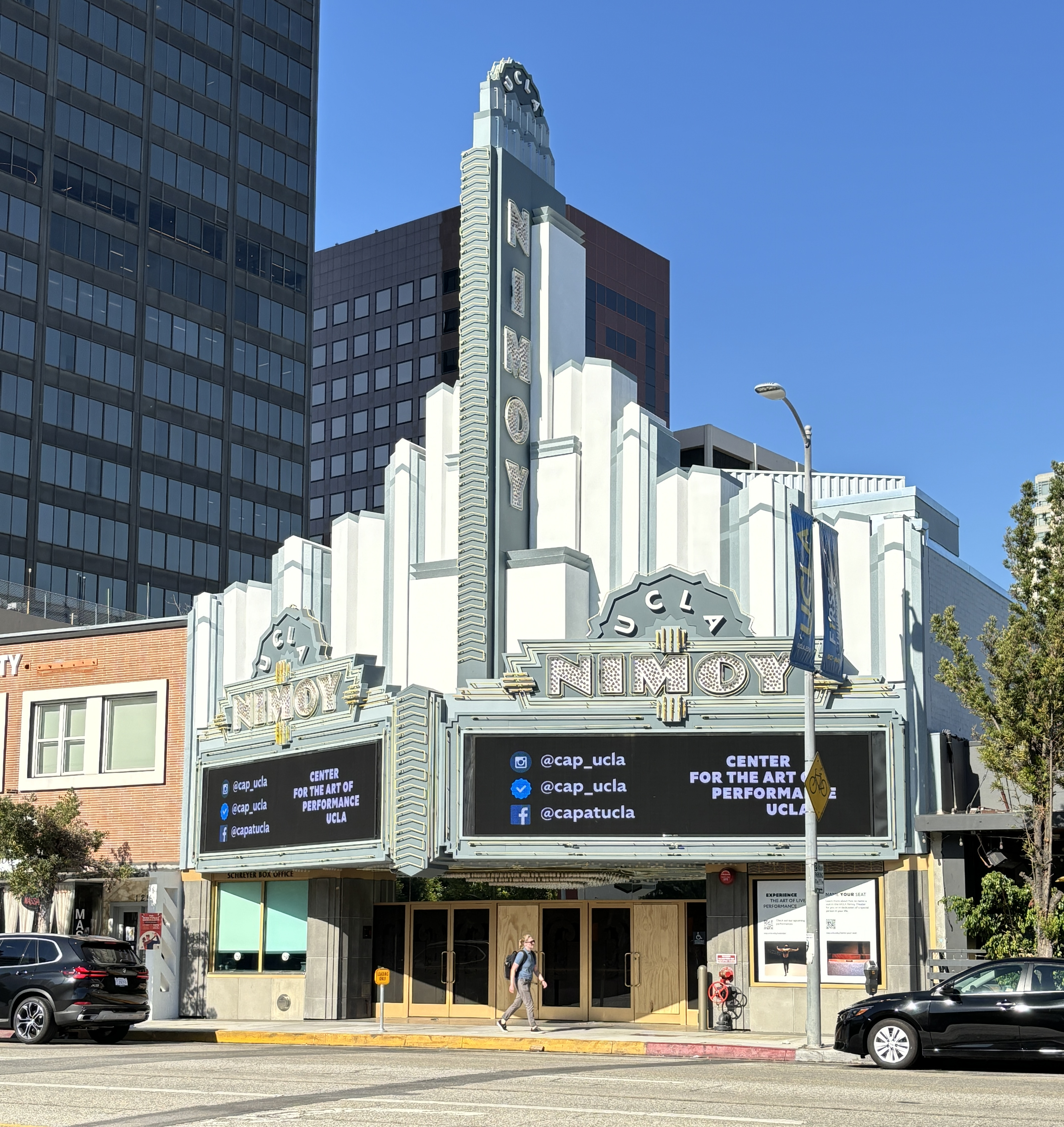
Nimoy Theater

- Fox Bruin Theater, 1937
- Fox Westwood Village Theater, 1930
- Nimoy Theater, 1941

=== Other ===
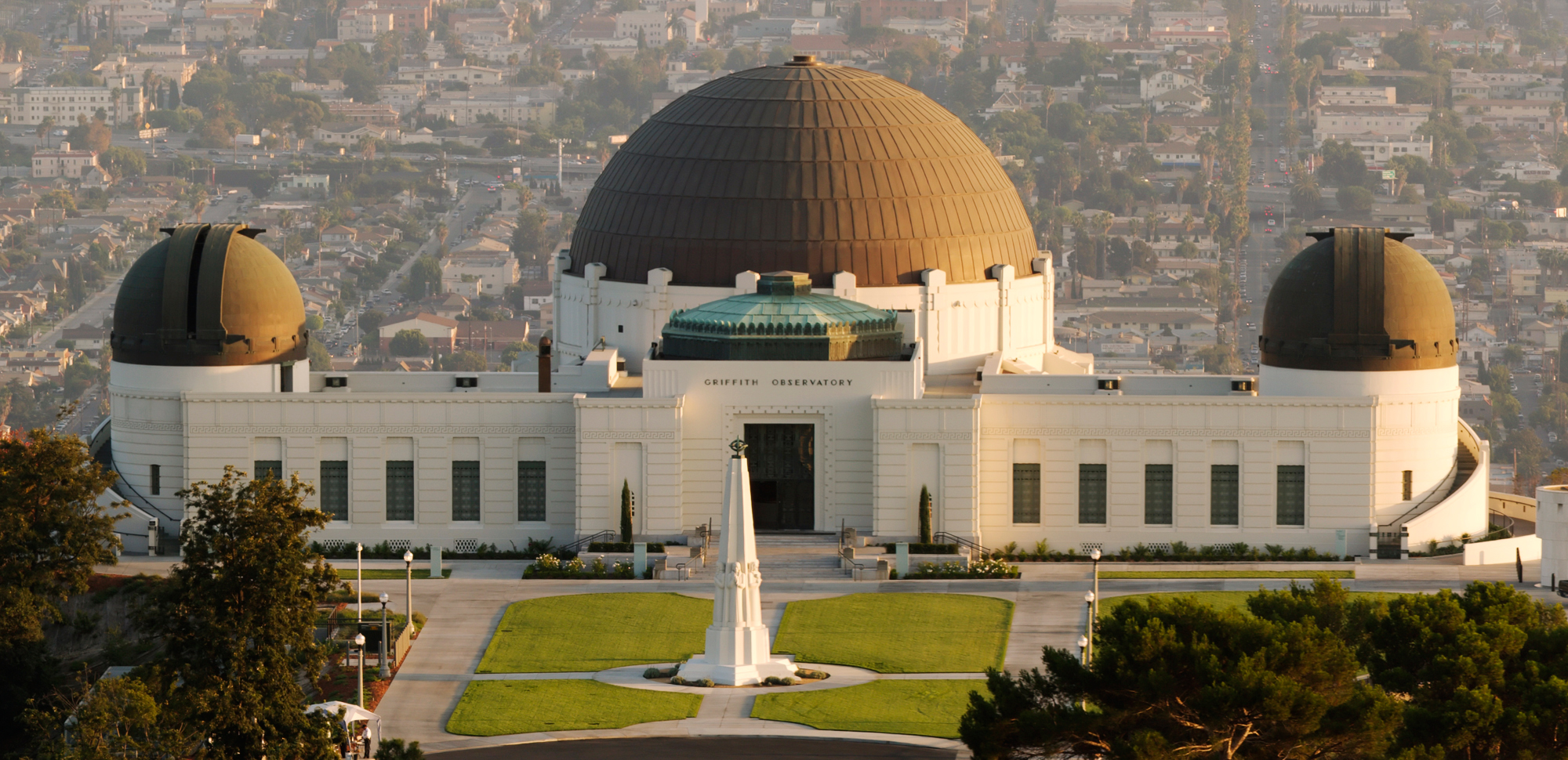
Griffith Observatory

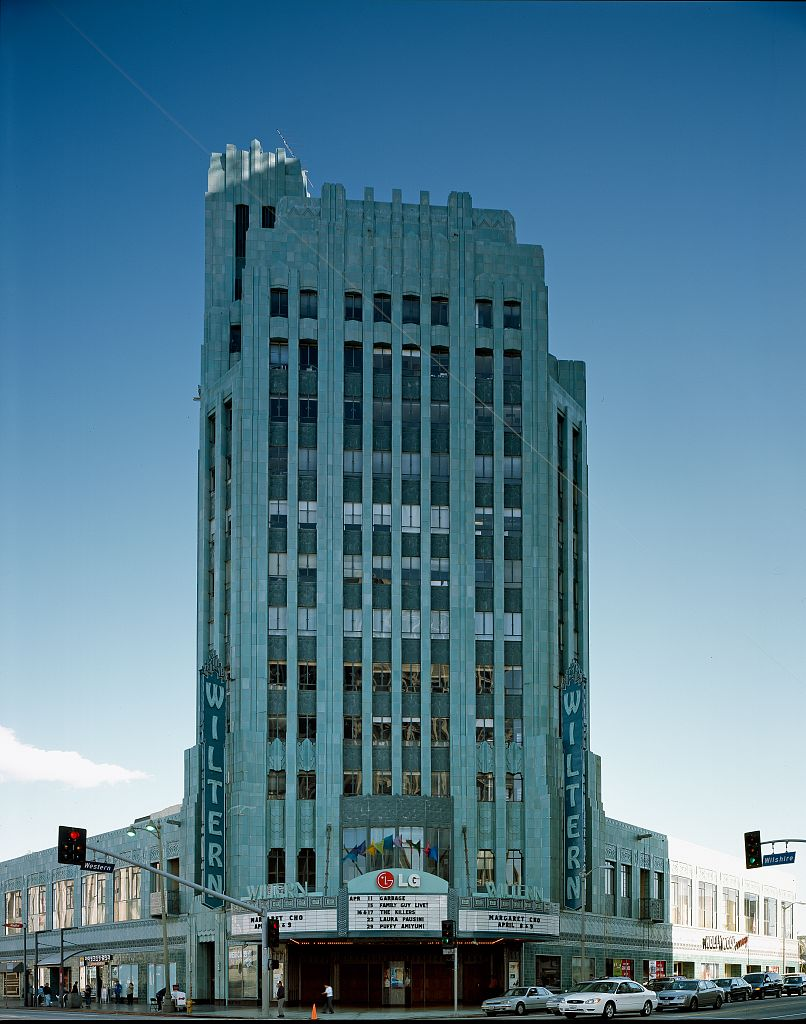
Pellissier Building and Wiltern Theatre

- 535 South Gramercy Place, 1931
- 3919 West 8th Street, 1940
- American Legion Post 377, 1928
- Angelus Temple, 1923
- Biegler Hall, University of Southern California, 1940
- Black Cat Tavern, 1939
- Bullocks Wilshire, 1929
- Distribution Station No. 28 Department of Water and Power, 1946
- Fire Station No. 1, 1940
- Golden State Mutual Life Insurance Building, 1949
- Griffith Observatory, 1935
- International College of Beauty Arts & Sciences
- Los Angeles General Medical Center, 1933
- Los Angeles Memorial Coliseum, 1923
- Los Feliz Manor Apartments, 1929
- Los Angeles Center for Enriched Studies, 1937
- Martin Luther King Jr. Elementary, 1935
- Park Plaza Hotel, 1924
- Pellissier Building and Wiltern Theatre, 1931
- Ravenswood Apartments, 1912
- Samuel-Novarro House, 1927
- Sears, Roebuck & Company Mail Order Building, 1927
- Social and Public Art Resource Center, 1929
- Venice Police Station, 1930
- Victor M. Carter House, 1935
- Vision Theatre, 1931
- Wilshire Ward Chapel, 1929

== Merced ==
- Blooming Affair Global & Gifts, c. 1930s
- The Mainzer, 1920s and 1931
- Merced Theatre, 1931

== Napa ==
- Bank of Napa (now Wells Fargo), 1934
- Food City Building, 1952
- Oberon Building, 1893, 1934
- United States Post Office Napa, 1933

== Oakland ==
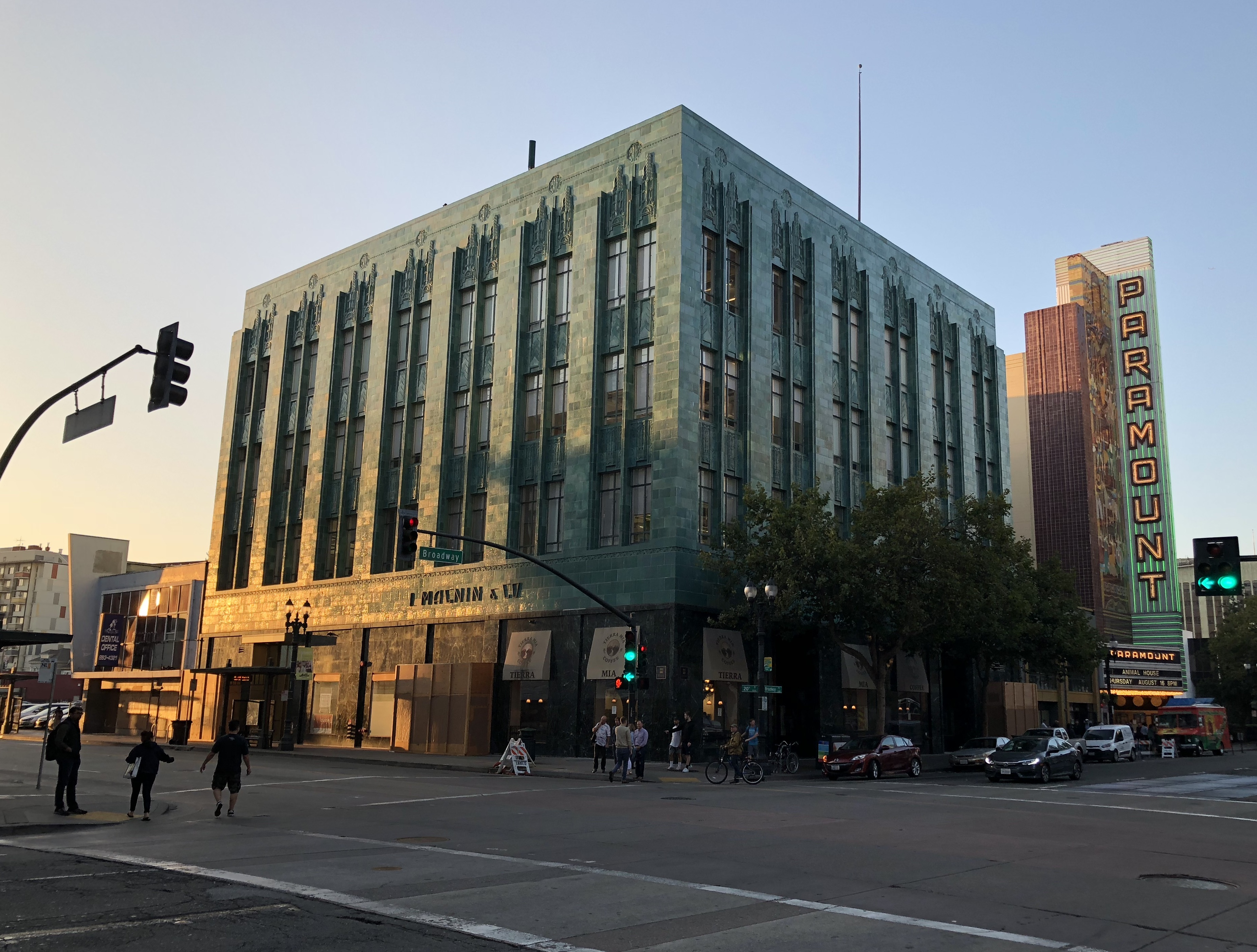
I. Magnin Building

- 10th Street Market, 1917 and 1926
- 347 14th Street, 1920s
- Alameda County Courthouse, 1939
- Breuner's Building, 1931
- Fox Oakland Theatre, 1928
- Hill Castle Apartment Building, 1930
- I. Magnin Building, 1930
- Mary A. Bowles Building, 1931
- Oakland Floral Depot, 1923
- Paramount Theatre, 1931
- Posey and Webster Street Tubes, 1928
- Sears Roebuck & Company, 1929

== Palo Alto ==
- Acme Glass Company, 1938
- Hoover Pavilion, 1931
- Stanford Theatre, 1920s

== Pasadena ==
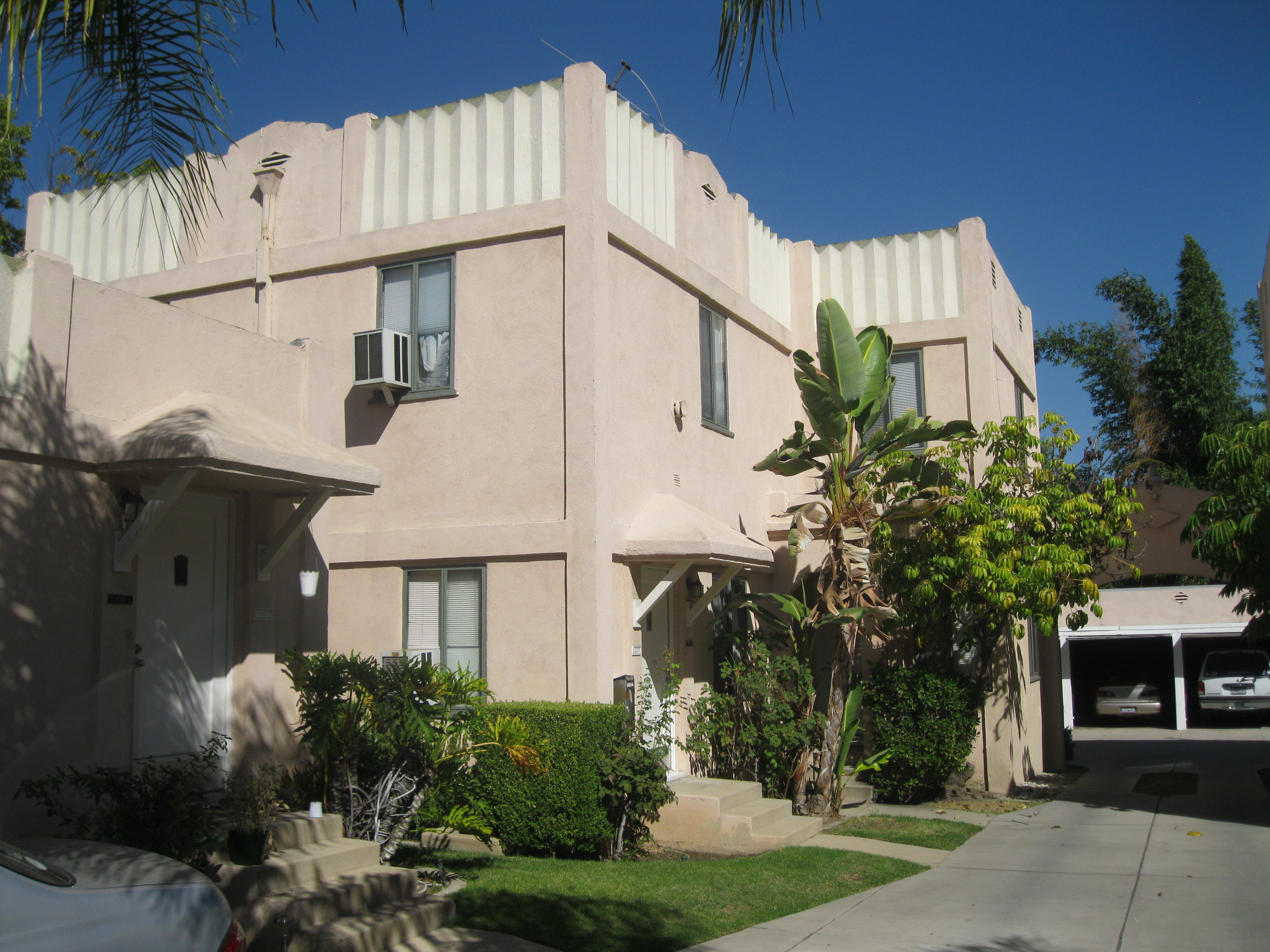
Court at 744–756½ S. Marengo Avenue

- Armory Gallery, 1932
- Bryan's Cleaners, 1938
- Bullock's Pasadena, 1944
- Court at 744–756½ South Marengo Avenue, 1931
- Glenarm Power Plant, 1927
- Pasadena Winter Garden, 1940
- Rose City Dental Arts, 1932
- Royal Laundry Complex, 1927
- United Artists Pasadena Theater, 1930
- Warner Building, 1927

== Sacramento ==
- California Transportation Commission, 1939
- Capitol Plaza, 1870 and 1936
- Chando's Cantina, 1948
- Colonial Theatre, 1940
- Crest Theatre, 1946
- Forum Building, 1911
- Frank Fat's Restaurant, Sacramento, 1939
- Grant Union High School Auditorium
- Iceland Skating Rink, 1940
- Lee House, 1941
- Metro Garage
- Odd Cookie
- Kress Building, 1931
- Sacramento City College Gymnasium and Auditorium, 1937
- Tower Theatre, 1938

== San Bernardino ==
- Helms Bakery Building, 1950s
- Landeros Furniture, 1927
- San Bernardino Tattoo, c. 1940s

== San Diego ==
=== Downtown ===
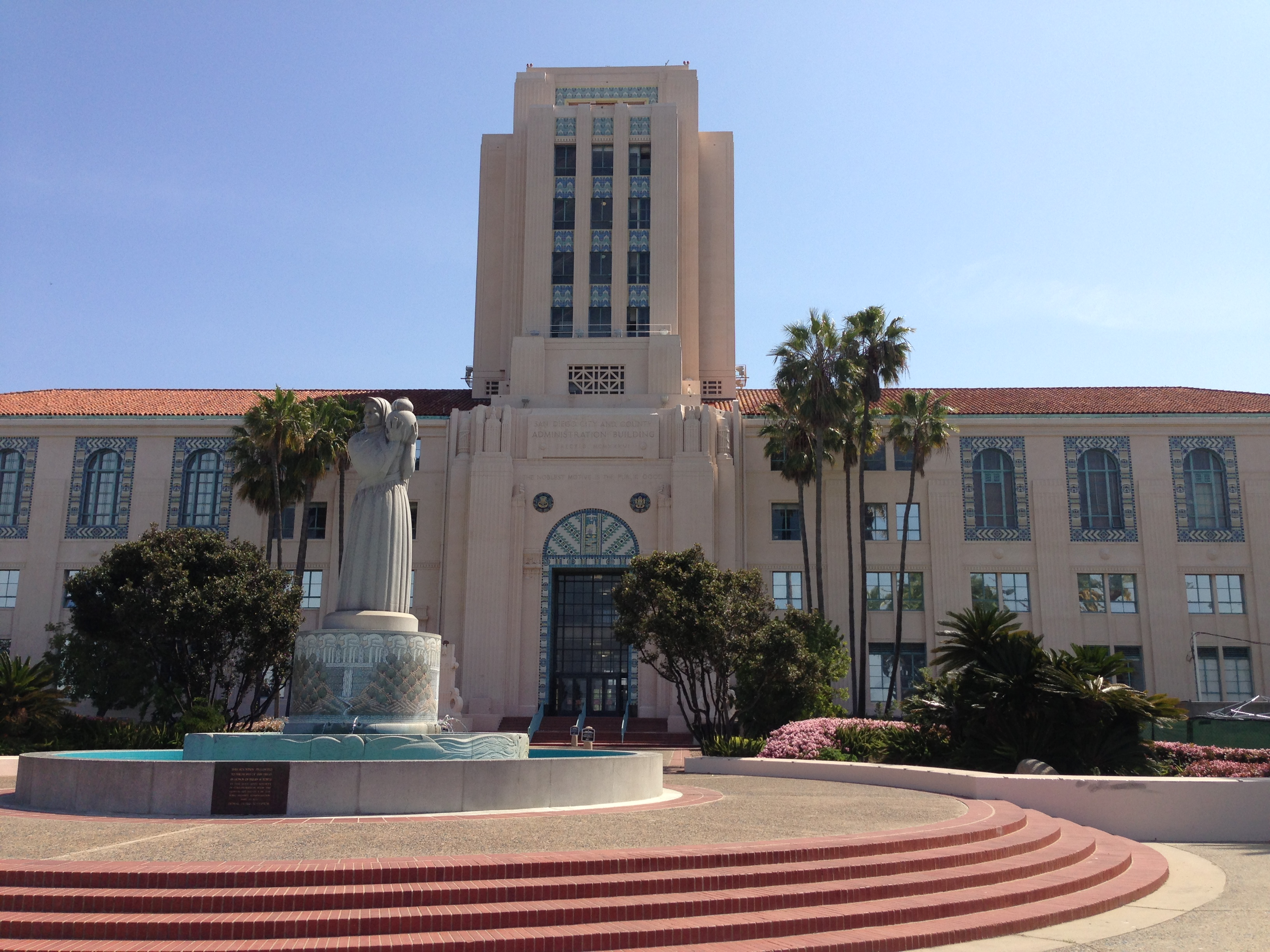
County Administration Center

- Architectural Salvage, 1930s
- Central Post Office, 1937
- County Administration Center, 1938
- Fire Station No. 4, 1937
- Firehouse Museum, 1920s
- McClintock Storage Warehouse, 1925
- Samuel I. Fox Building, 1929
- San Diego Athletic Club, 1928

=== Other ===
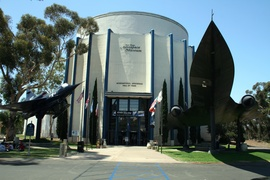
Ford Building

- 3090 Polk Avenue, 1930
- 3489 Noell Street, 1940s
- 3701 6th Avenue, 1930s
- 4304 Park Boulevard, 1943
- Dalton Building, 1930
- Euclid Tower, 1932
- Ford Building
- Municipal Gymnasium, 1935
- Silverado Ballroom, 1931
- Silver Gate Three Stars Masonic Lodge No 296, 1931
- Sixth Church of Christ Scientist, 1940s or 1950s

== San Francisco ==
=== Downtown ===
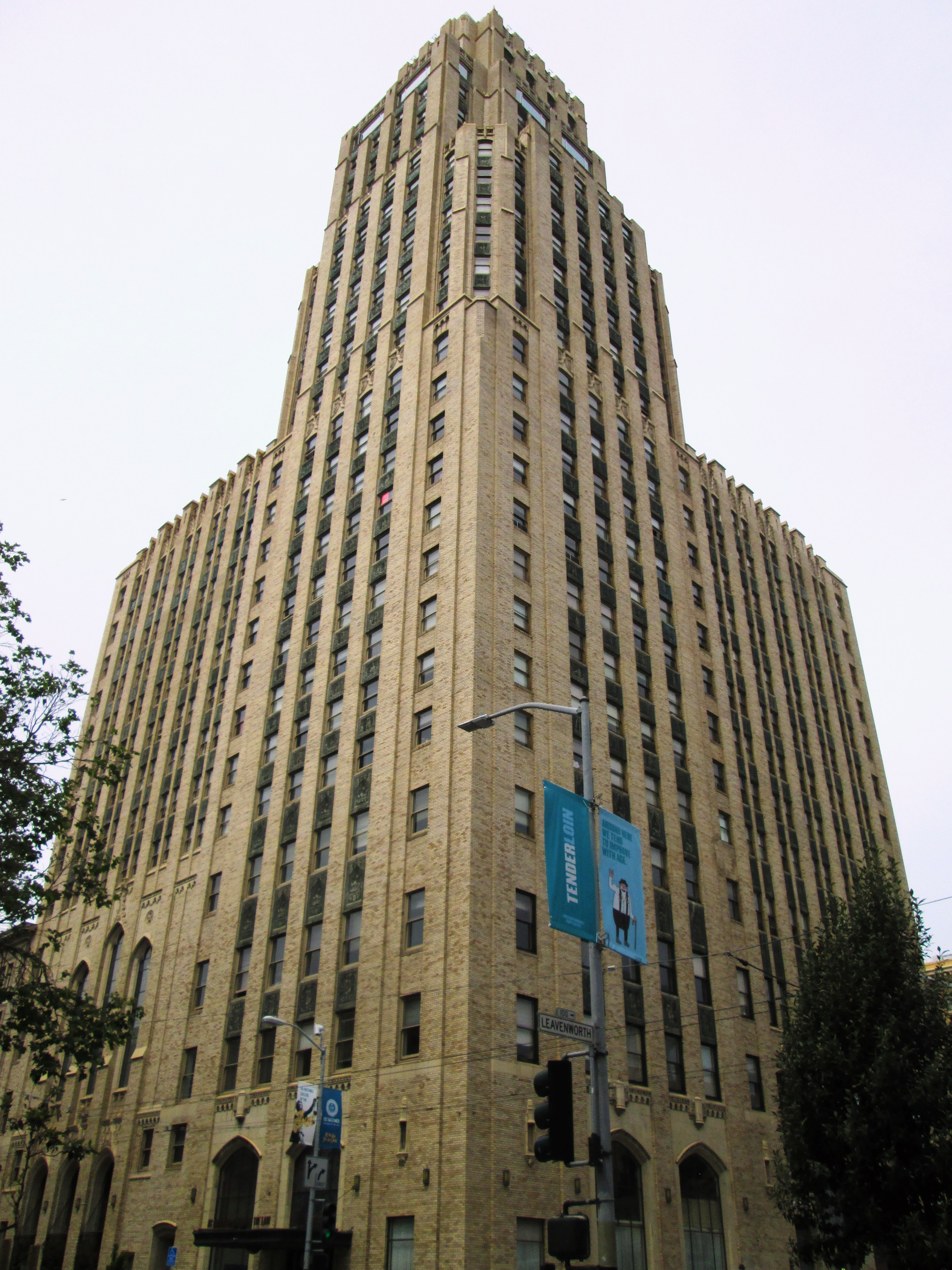
McAllister Tower Apartments

- 140 New Montgomery, 1925
- 450 Sutter Street, 1929
- Central Tower, 1938
- McAllister Tower Apartments, 1930
- One Montgomery Tower, 1982
- Rincon Center, 1940
- Sailor's Union of the Pacific, 1950
- San Francisco Galvanizing Works
- San Francisco Mint, 1937
- Shell Building, 1929
- Stock Exchange Tower, 1930
- Transbay Terminal, 1939
- Speaker Towers, 1939
- United States Appraisers and Stores and Immigration Station, 1944

=== Treasure Island ===
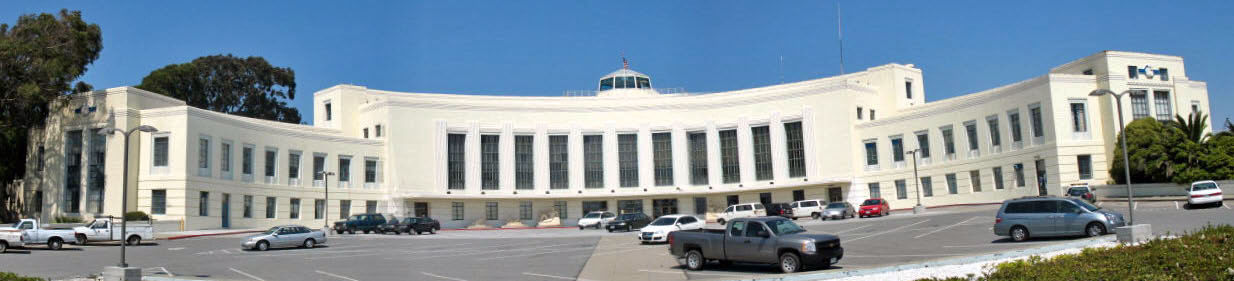
Treasure Island Administration Building

- Administration Building, 1938
- Hall of Transportation, 1938
- Palace of Fine and Decorative Arts, 1938

=== Other ===
Golden Gate Bridge

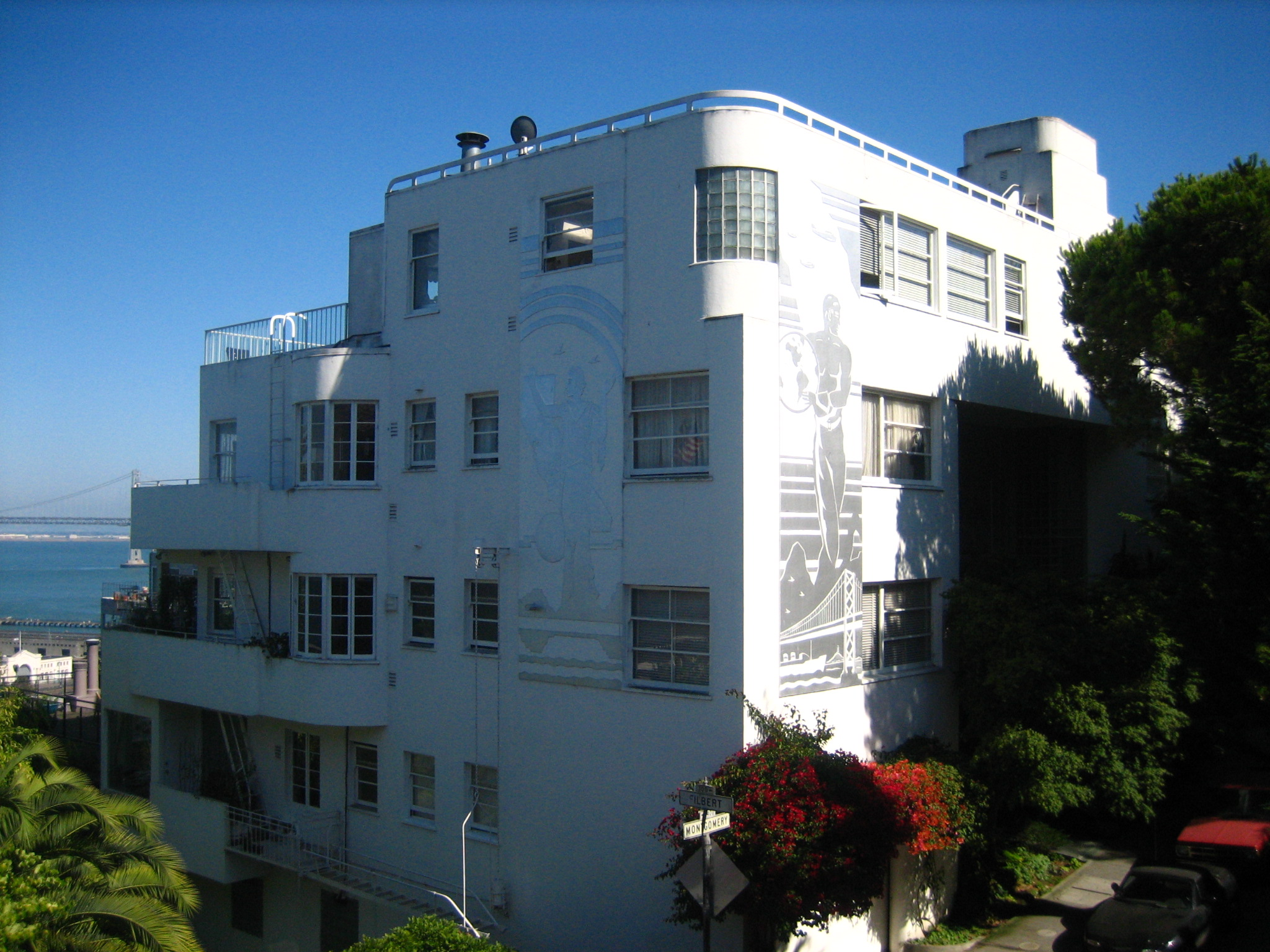
Malloch Building

- Balboa Theatre, 1926
- Bently Nob Hill, 1924
- Bridge Cafe, 1938
- Round House Café, 1938
- Castro Theatre interior, 1922
- Circus Center, 1929
- Coit Tower, 1933
- Doelger Building, 1932
- El Rey Theatre, 1931
- Eng-Skll Company, 1930
- Golden Gate Bridge, 1937
- Horseshoe Tavern, 1934
- Malloch Building, 1937
- Maritime Museum, 1936
- New Mission Theater, 1916
- Ocean Park Motel, 1937
- Presidio Theatre, 1937
- Roxie Theater, 1933
- San Francisco VA Medical Center, 1934
- Verdi Club, 1935

== Santa Ana ==
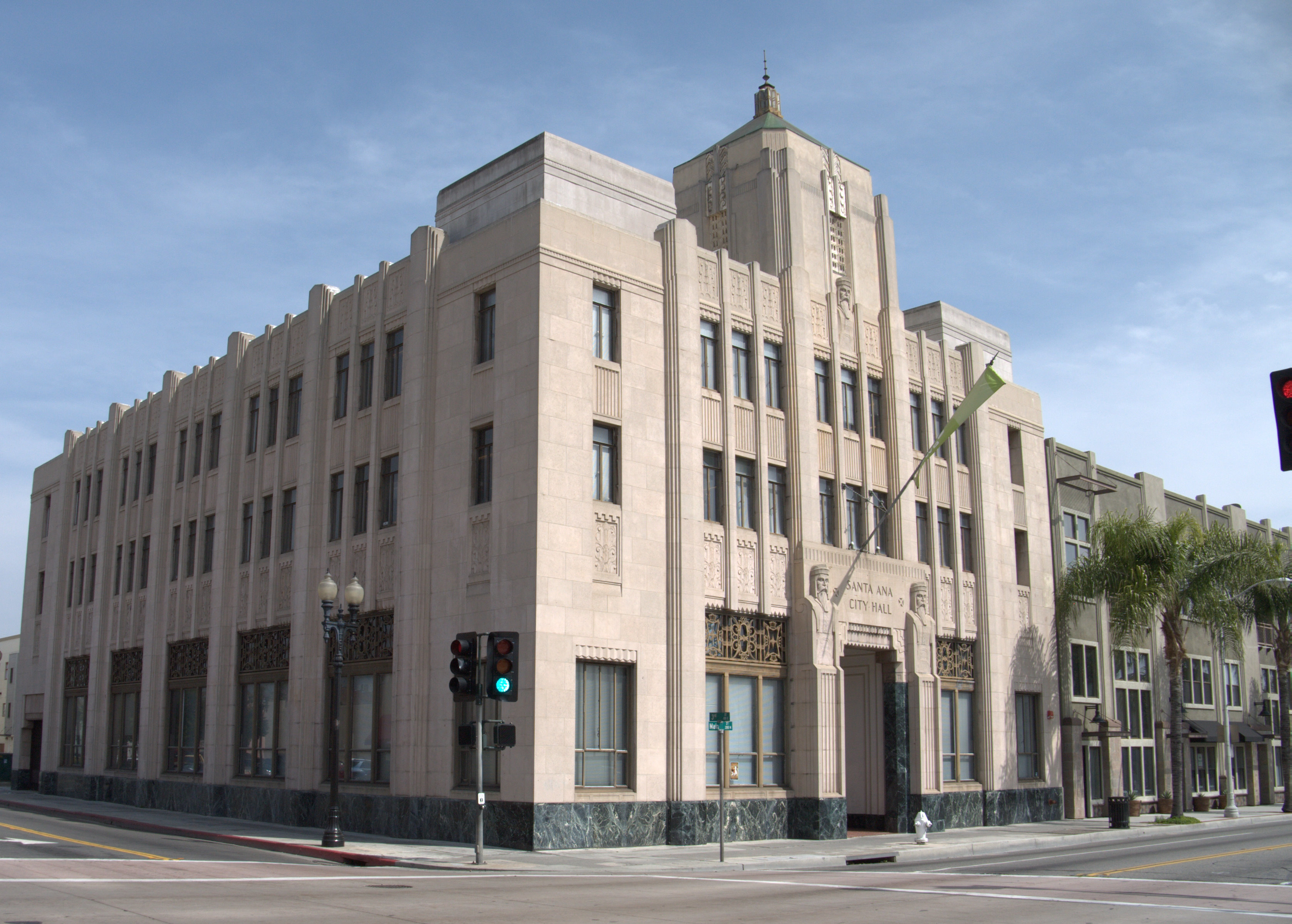
Santa Ana City Hall

- Empire Market Building, 1933
- Horton Furniture Building, 1929
- Old Santa Ana City Hall, 1935
- Santa Ana Performing Arts Event Center, 1923

== Santa Monica ==
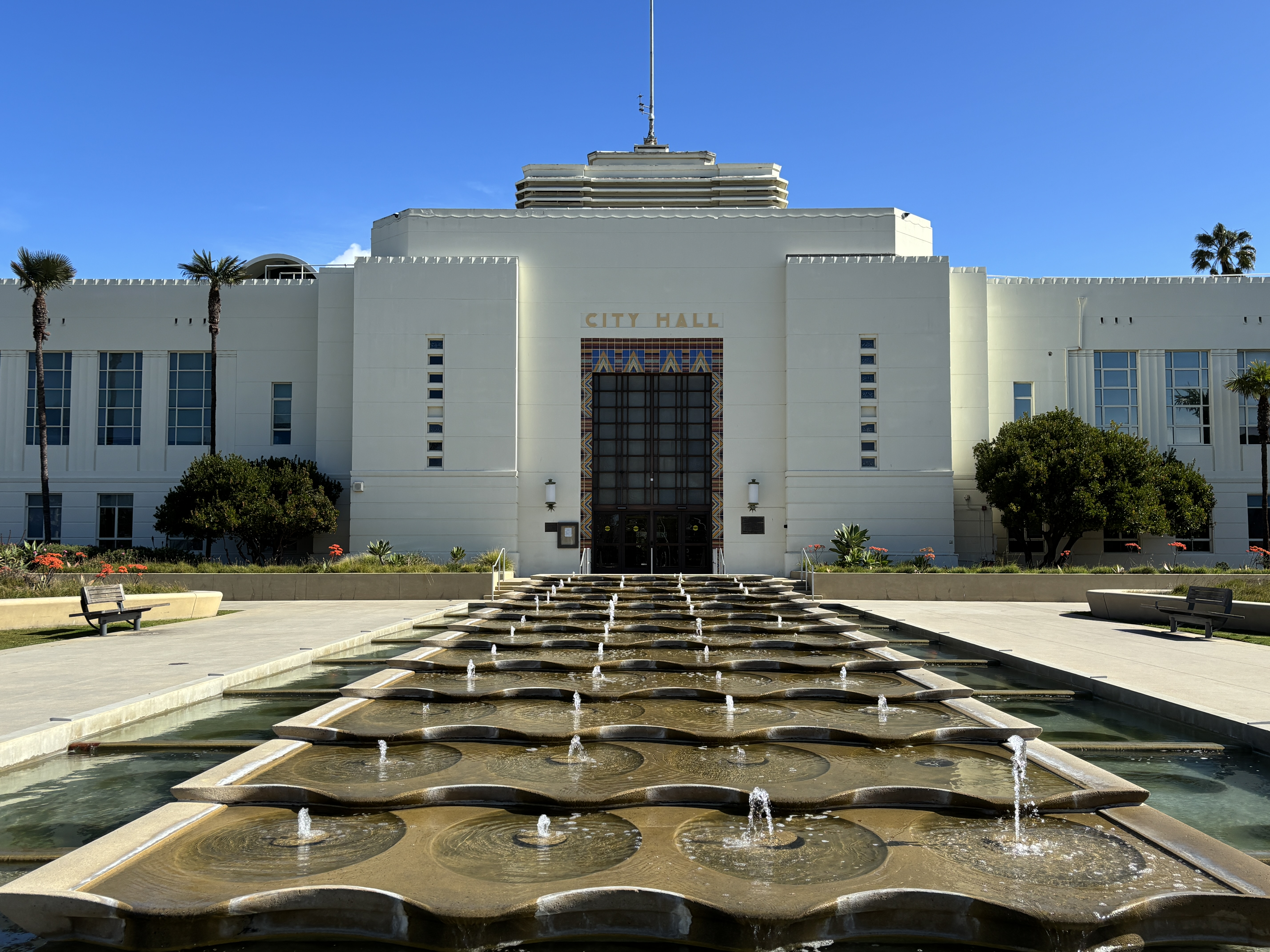
Santa Monica City Hall

- Charmont Apartments, 1928
- Clock Tower Building, 1930
- Georgian Hotel, 1931
- Santa Monica City Hall, 1939
- Sears, Roebuck & Company, 1947
- Shangri-La Apartments, 1940
- United States Post Office Santa Monica, 1937
- Vogue Apartments, 1937
- Voss Apartments, 1937
- Wilshire Theatre, 1931

== Stockton ==
- Fox California Theater, 1930
- Connell Motor Truck Co., c. 1930s
- United States Post Office Stockton, 1933

== Visalia ==
- Department of Public Social Services 1935
- Masonic Temple, 1935
- United States Post Office-Visalia Town Center Station, 1933

== West Hollywood ==
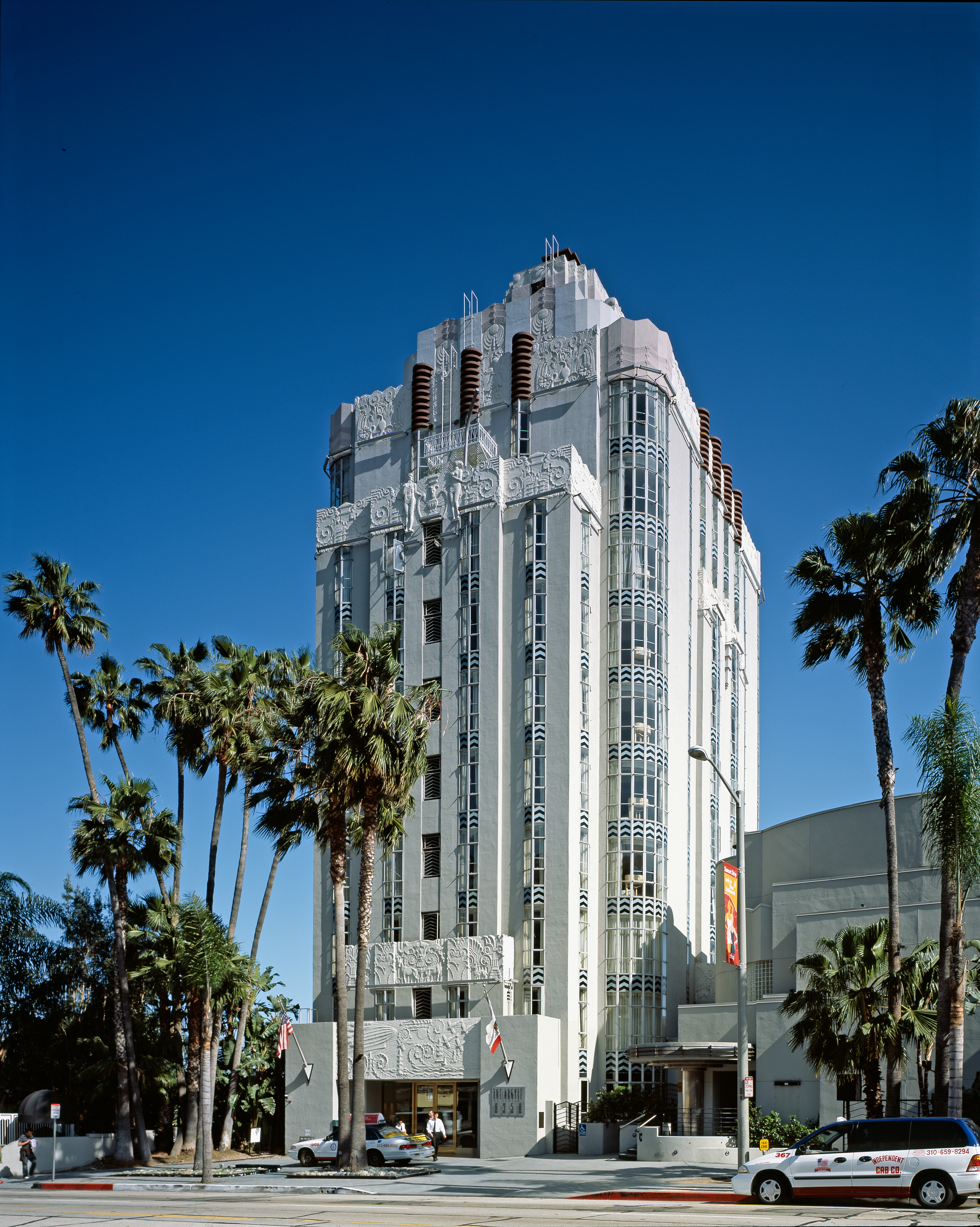
Sunset Tower

- Doheny Courtyard, 1930s
- Eugene C. Jones Veterinary Office, 1938
- Roxy Theatre, 1973
- Sunset Tower, 1931

== Whittier ==
- Cool-A-Coo Building, 1930
- National Trust and Savings, 1935
- St. Mary of the Assumption Catholic Church, 1930
- United States Post Office Whittier, 1935

== Other cities ==
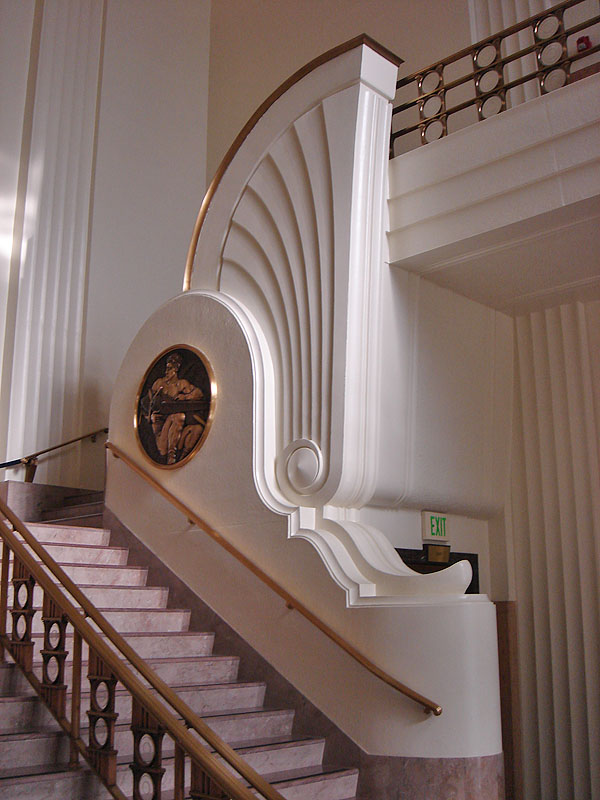
Burbank City Hall rotunda

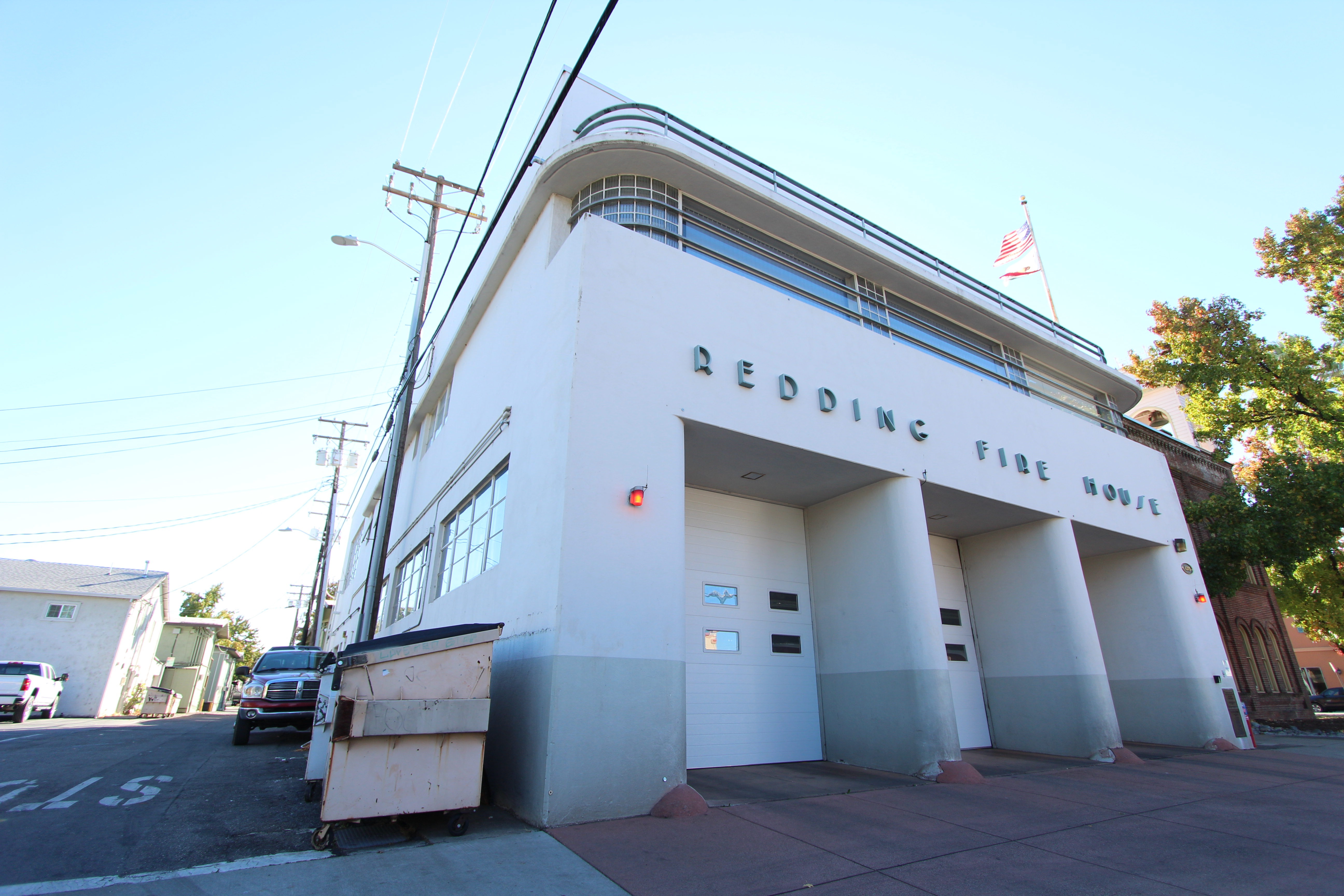
Redding Fire House

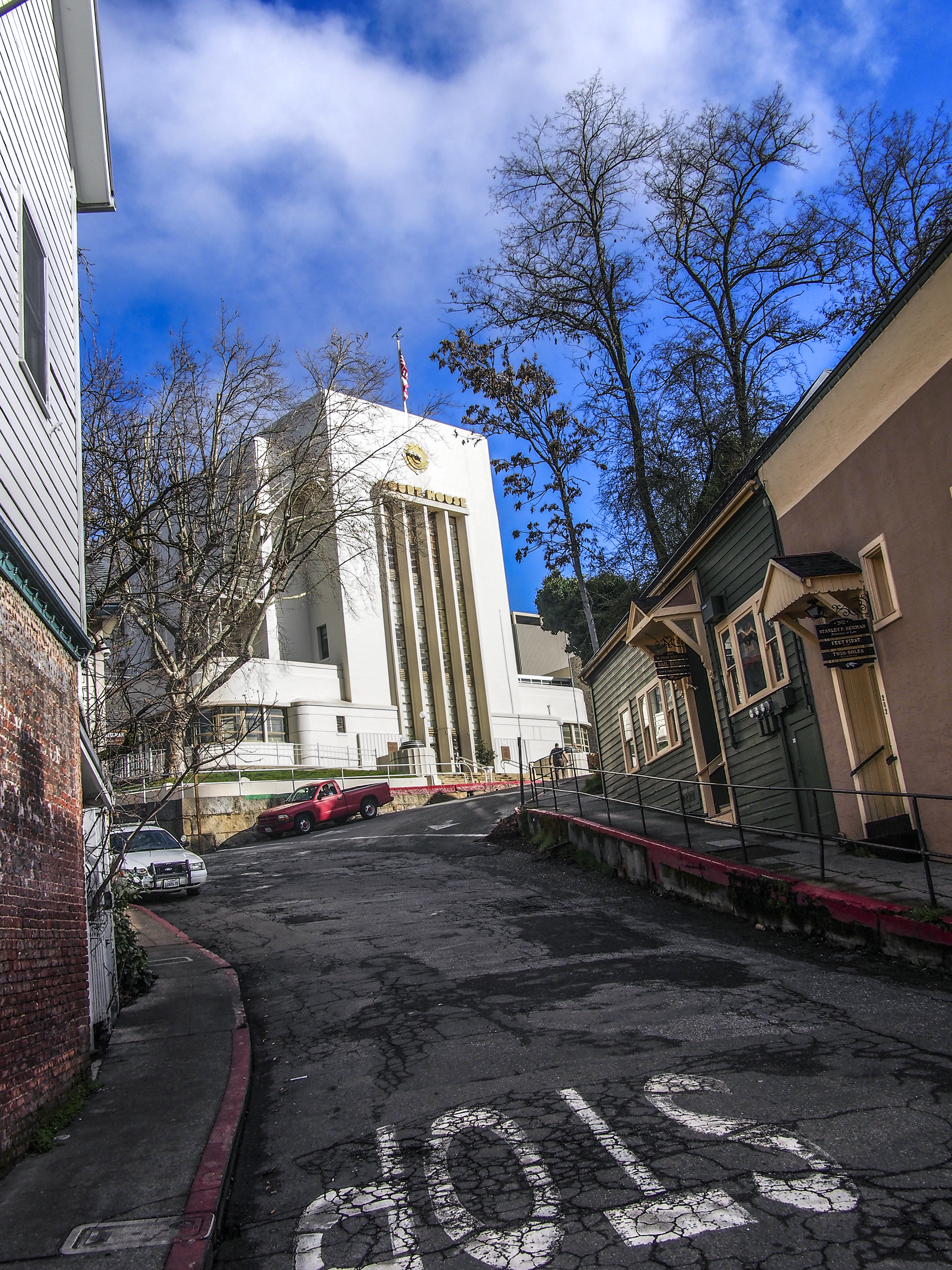
Nevada County Courthouse

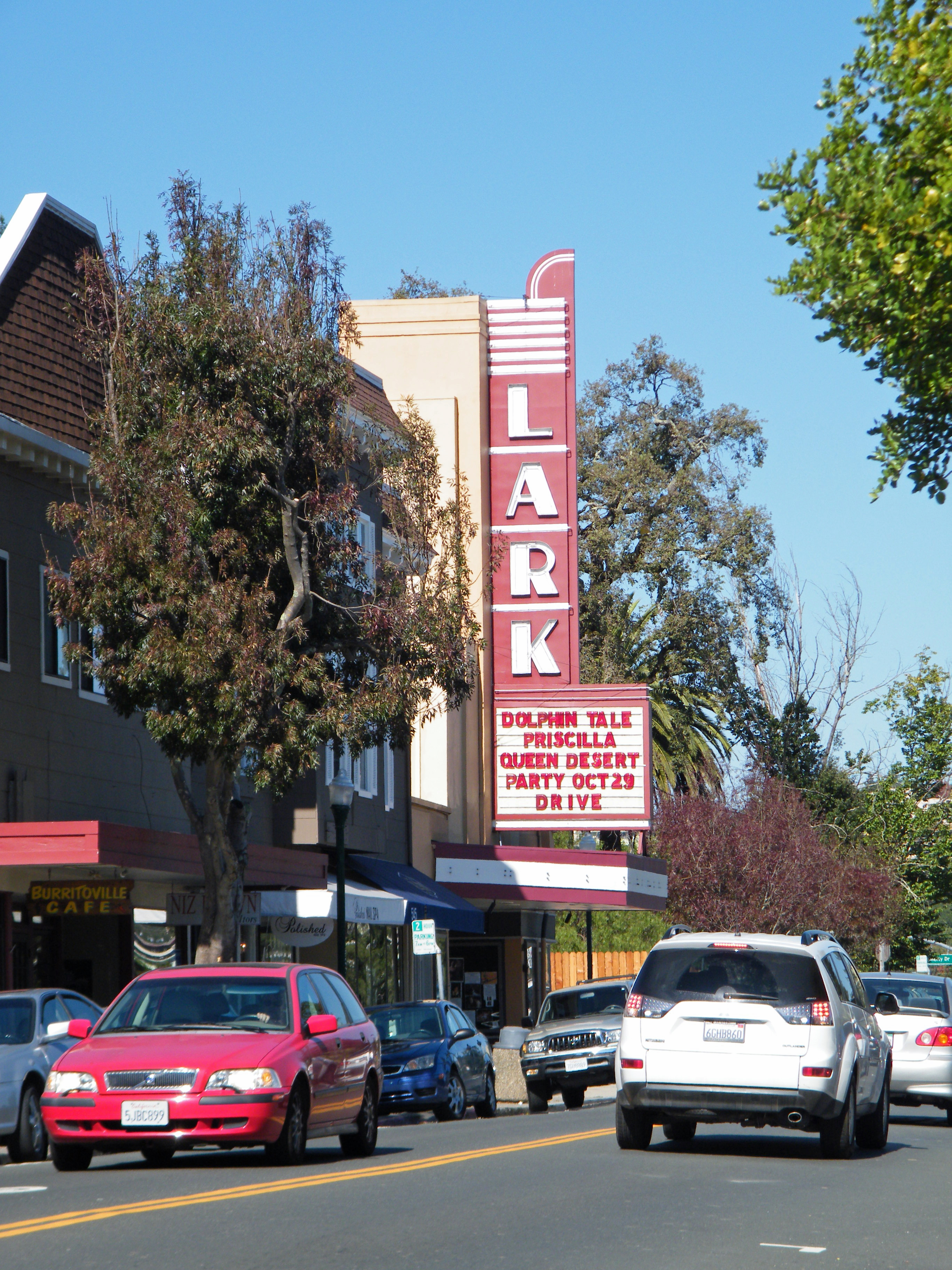
Lark Theater

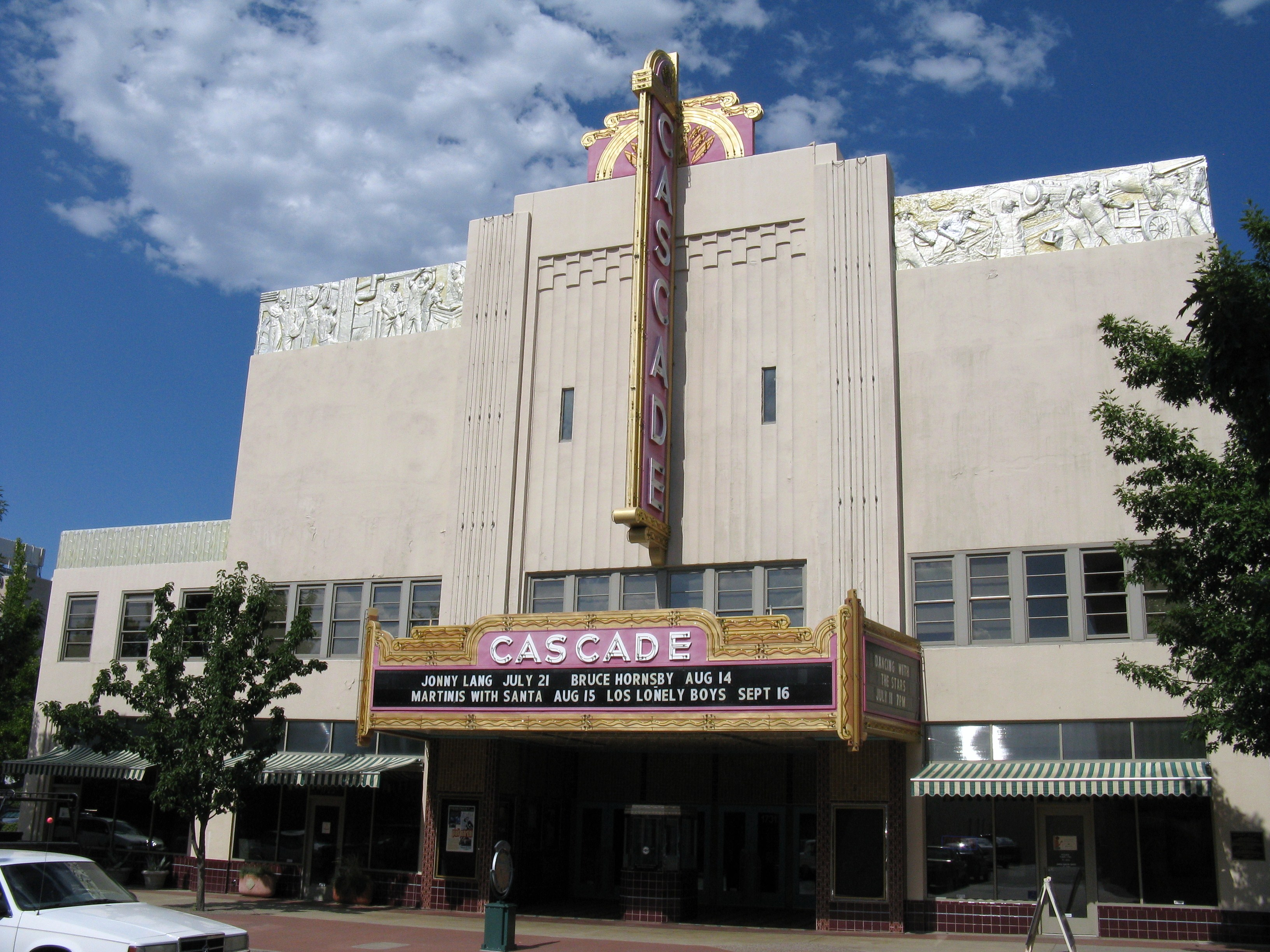
Cascade Theater

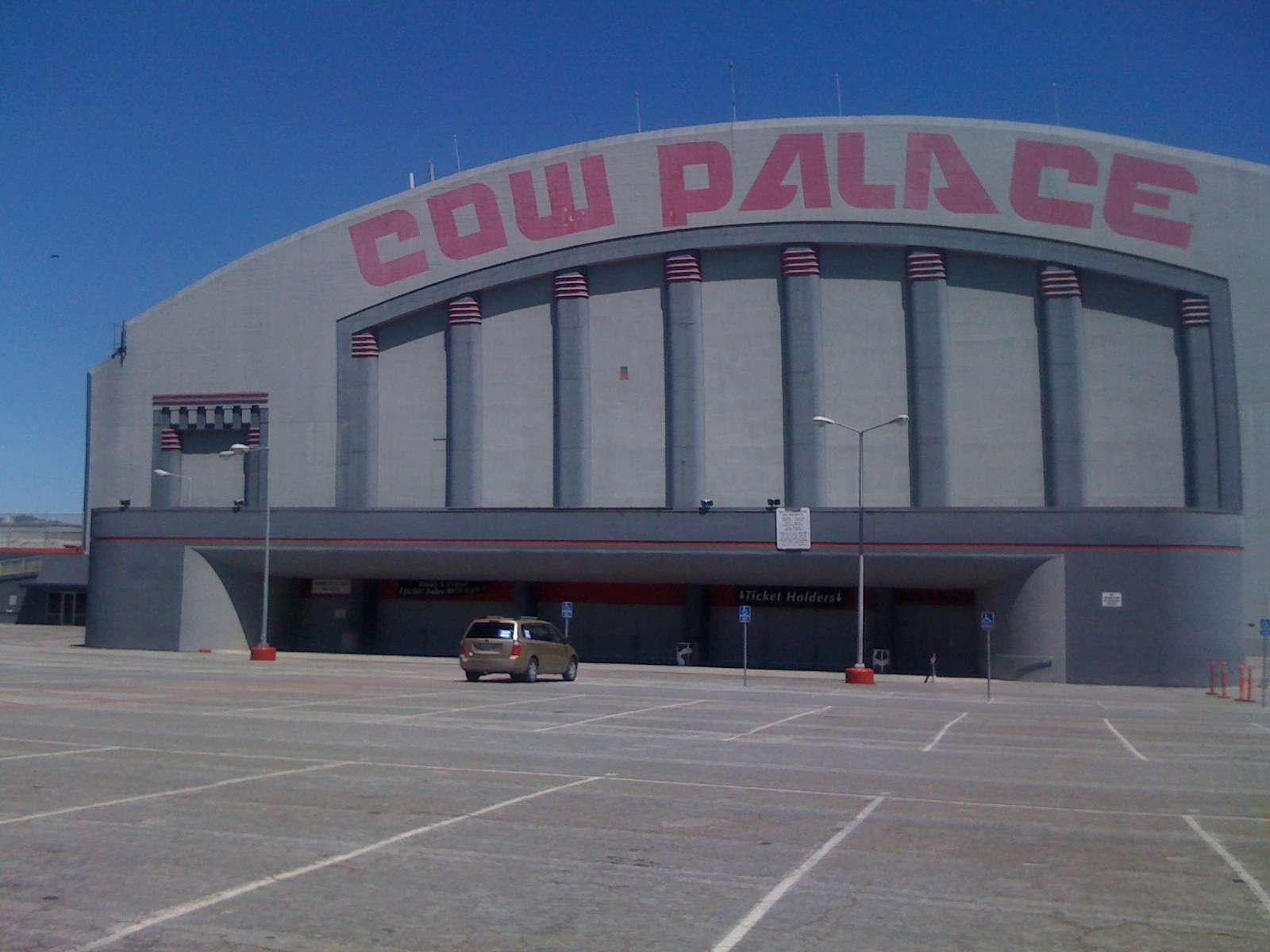
Cow Palace

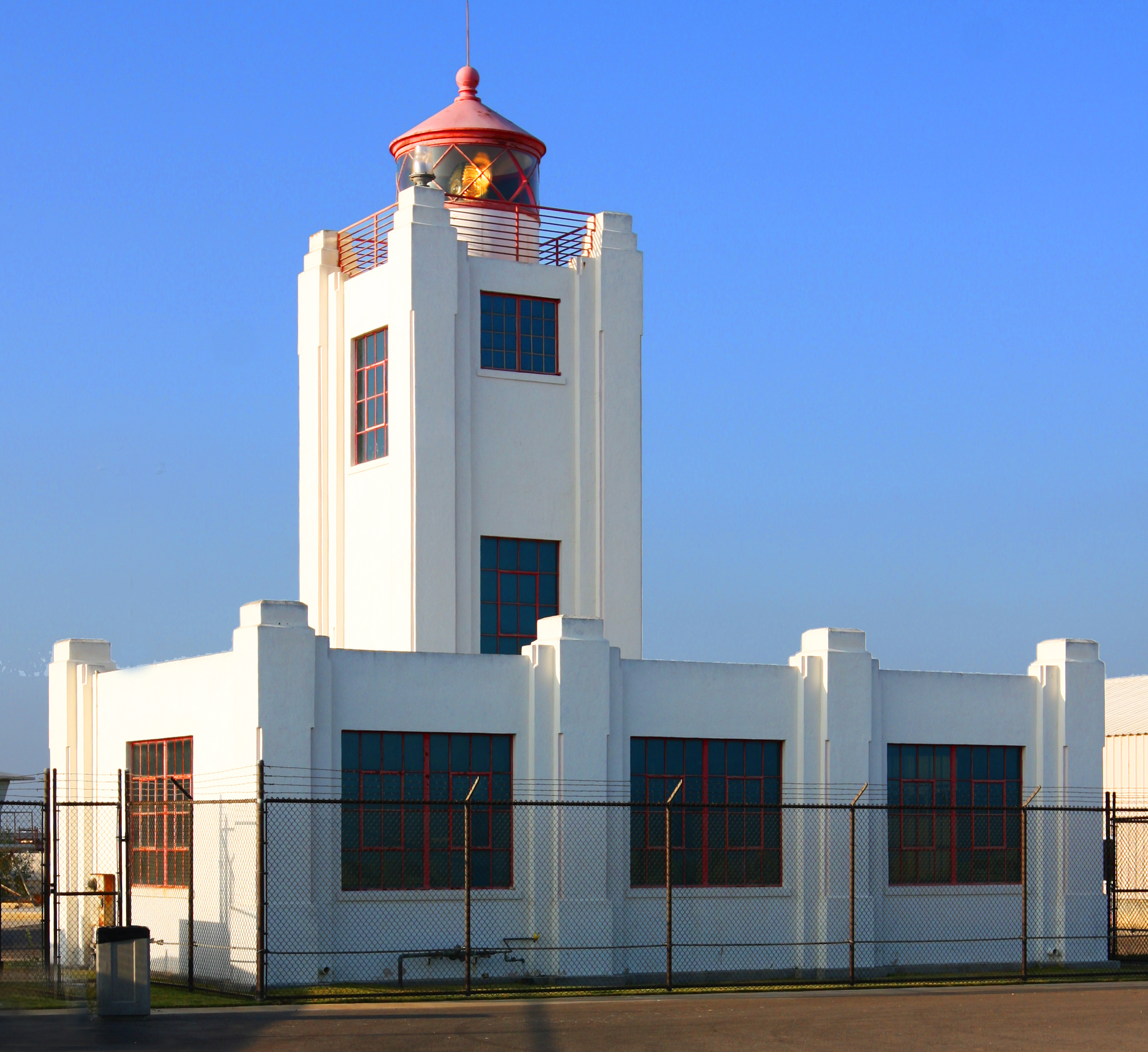
Point Hueneme Light

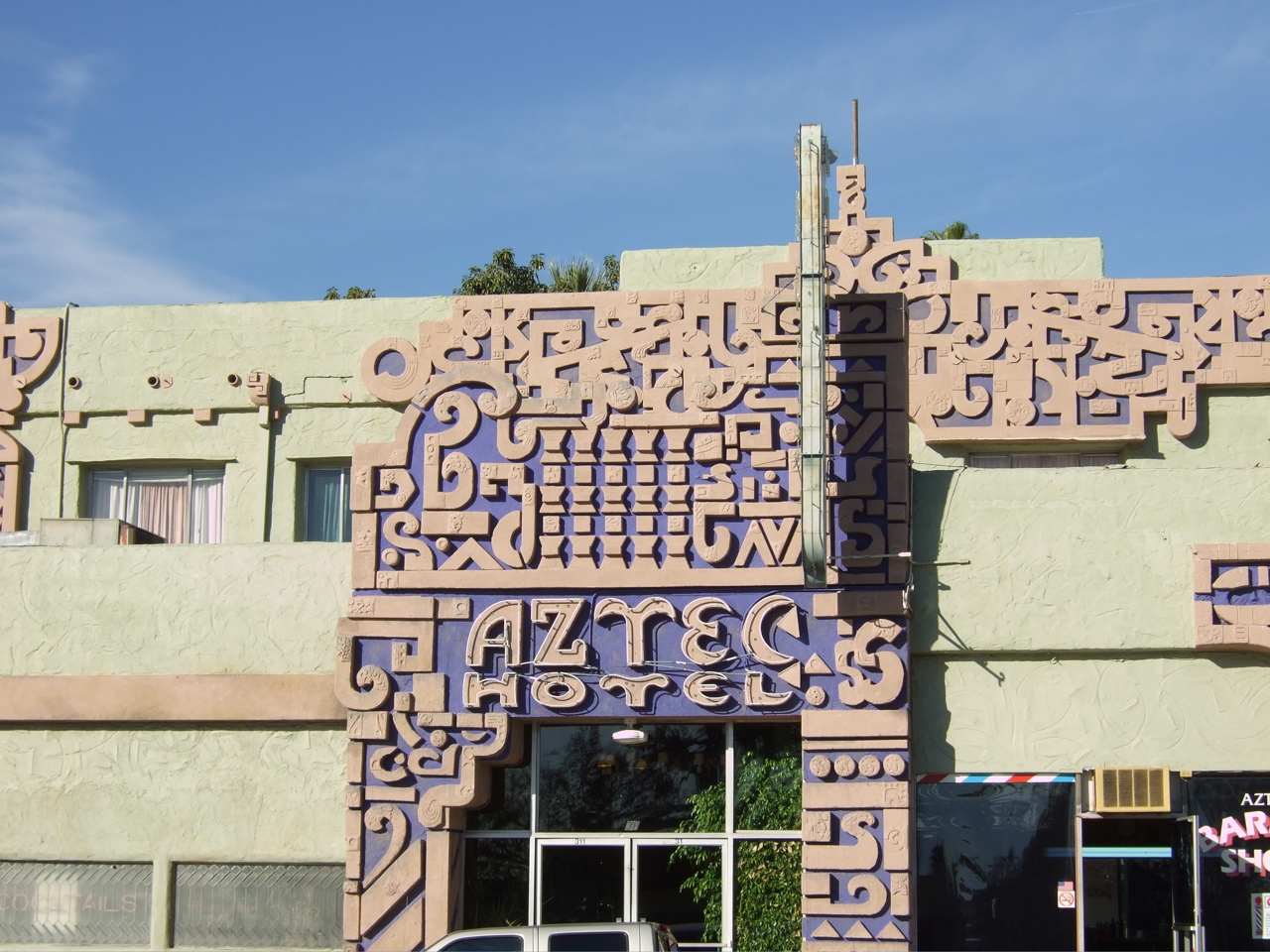
Aztec Hotel

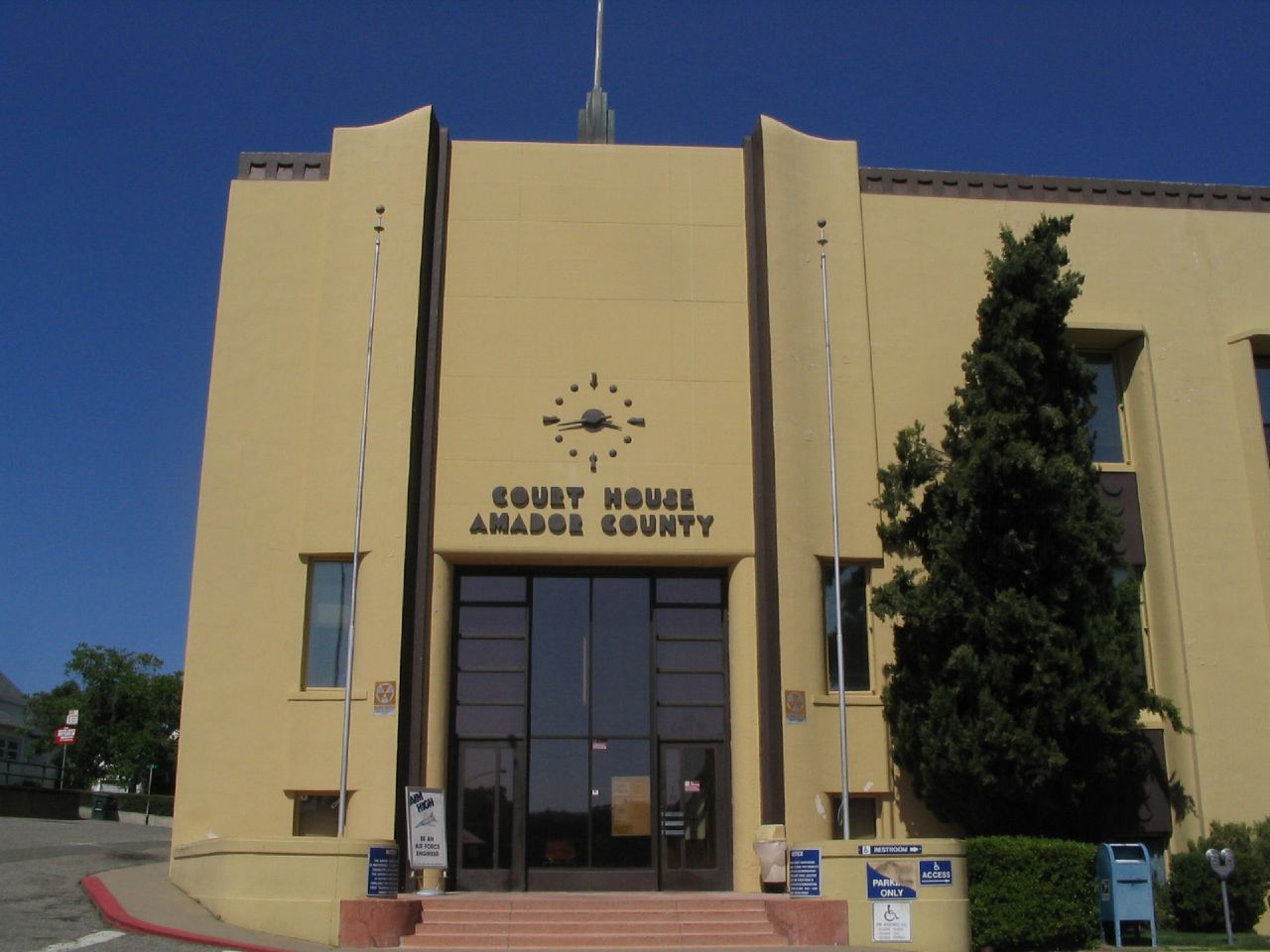
Amador County Courthouse

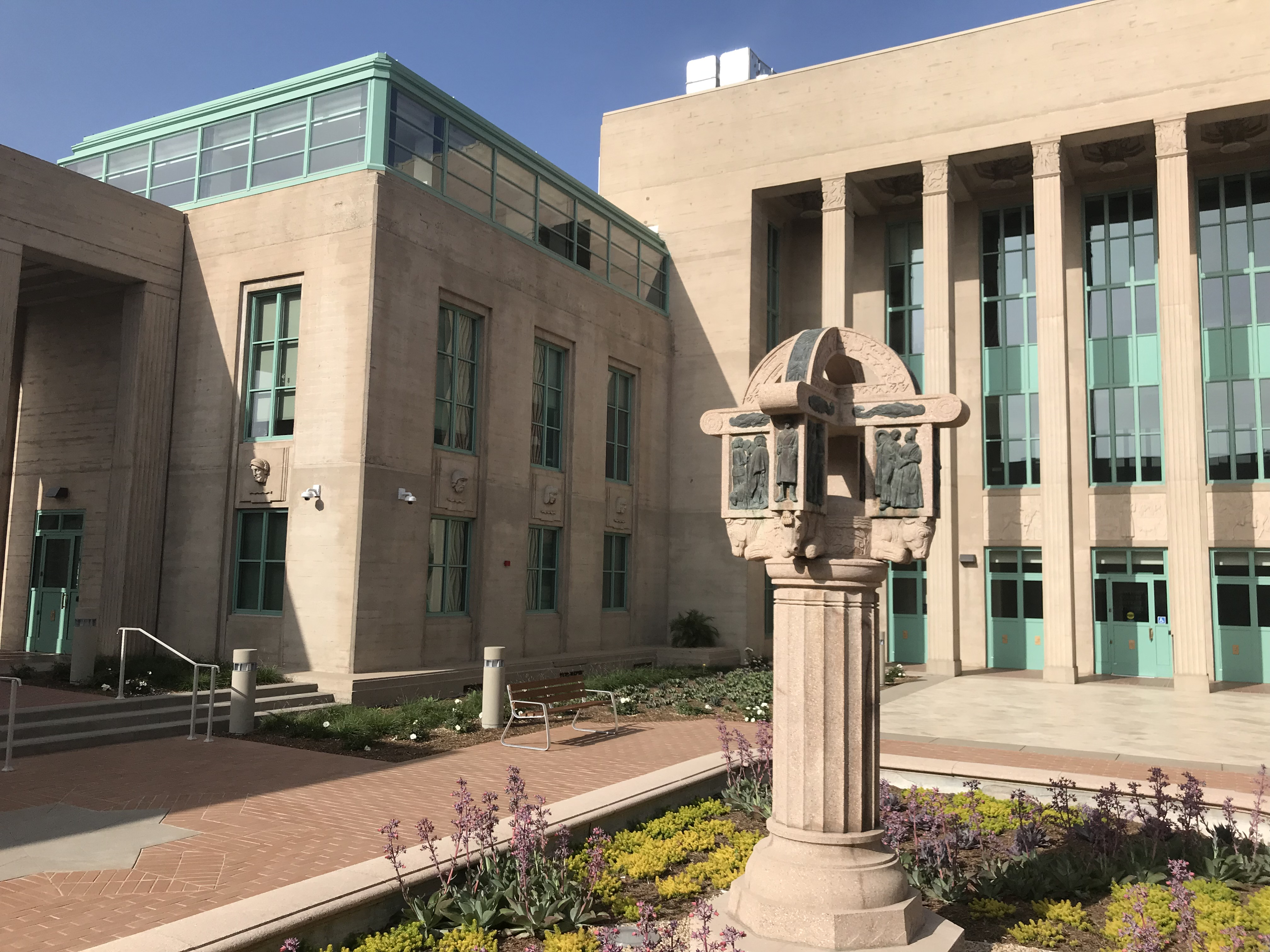
Monterey County Courthouse

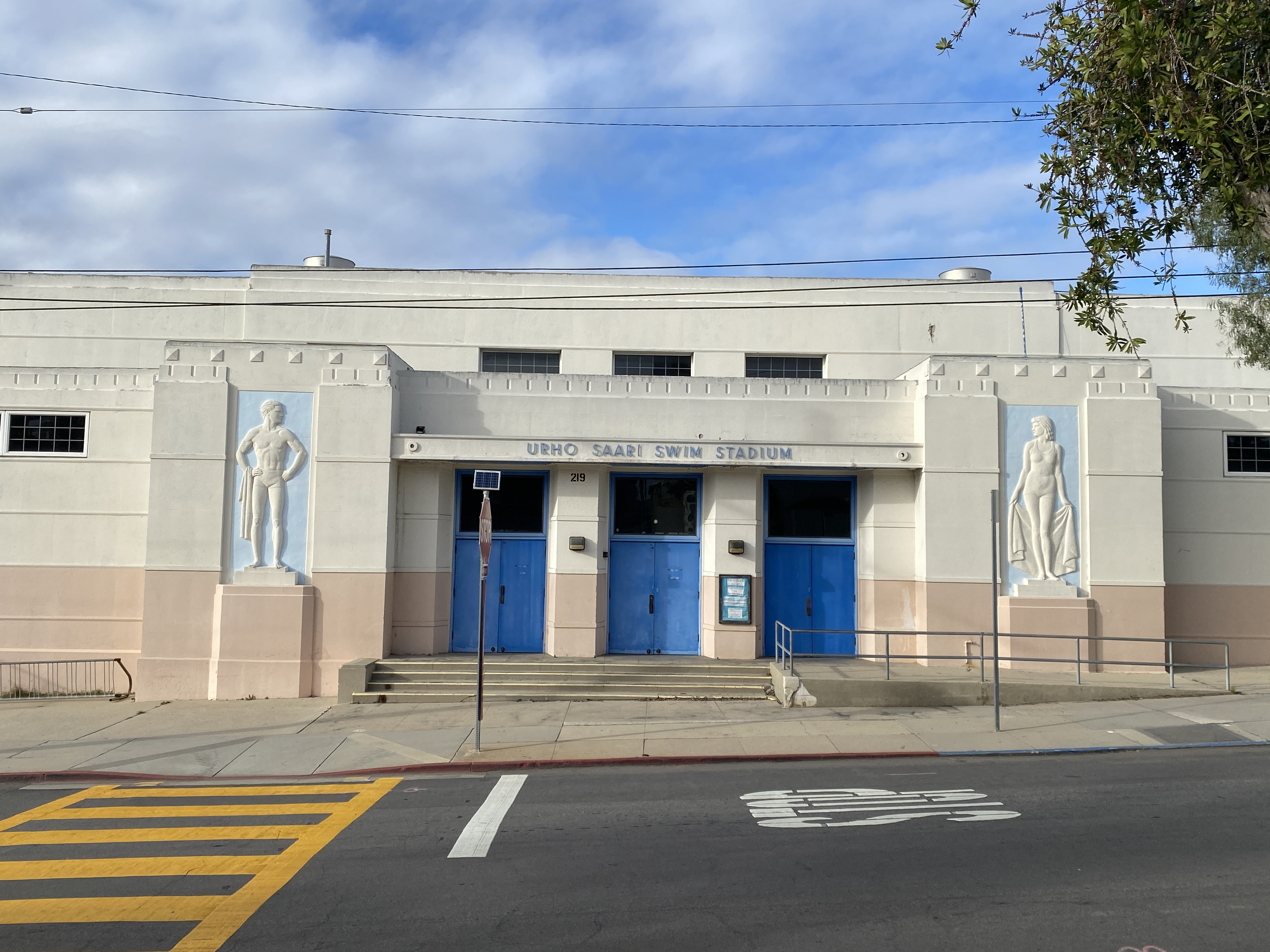
Urho Saari Swim Stadium

- 6990 Palm Avenue, Highland, 1936
- Sacramento McClellan Airport Administrative Building, Sacramento County, 1936
- Aimee's Castle, Lake Elsinore, c. 1920s
- Alameda Theatre, Alameda, 1932
- Alameda Theater, East Los Angeles, 1931
- Albany Cinema, Albany, c. 1920s
- Amador County Courthouse, Jackson, 1940
- Angels 6 Theatre, Angels Camp, 1936
- Arcadia News Journal Building, Arcadia, 1932
- Arcata Theatre Lounge, Arcata, 1937
- Arena Theater, Point Arena, 1928
- Avenal Theater, Avenal, 1935
- Aztec Hotel, Monrovia, 1924
- Bank of America, Chico, 1931
- Bank of America, Los Gatos, 1931
- Beekay Theatre, Tehachapi, 1932
- Bella Terra, Huntington Beach, 1965
- Bernardi's Cleaners, Alameda, 1946
- Beverly Fabrics, Salinas, 1920s
- Bishop Twin Theatre, Bishop, 1929
- Blue Cross Veterinary Hospital, Signal Hill, 1927
- Boathouse, Alhambra
- Bonanza Tortilleria, Modesto, 1937
- Bowling Alley, La Crescenta-Montrose
- Broadway Twin Theatre, Yreka, 1930
- Bubbles Balboa Club, Newport Beach, 1950s
- Bun-N-Burger, San Gabriel, 1941
- Burbank City Hall, Burbank, 1943
- Butte County Hospital, Oroville, 1945
- California Theater, Dunsmuir, 1926
- Cascade Theatre, Redding, 1934
- Catalina Casino, Avalon, 1929
- Catalina Coffee Company, Redondo Beach, 1950
- Christian Science Reading Room, Santa Barbara, 1950
- Christopher B. Smith Rafael Film Center, San Rafael
- Claypool & Co, Needles, 1930
- Colin P. Kelly Elementary School, Compton, 1933
- Cloverdale Creamery, Fremont, 1927
- Cow Palace, Daly City, 1941
- Daily Republic Building, Fairfield
- De Anza Hotel, San Jose, 1931
- De Anza Theatre, Riverside, 1937–1939
- Dr. George Hein's Residence and Dental Practice, San Carlos, 1936
- Eagles Building, Redondo Beach, 1949
- El Primero Hotel, Chula Vista, 1930
- Esslinger Building, San Juan Capistrano, 1939
- Eureka Theater, Eureka, 1939
- First Baptist Church of Ventura, Ventura, 1932
- First National Trust and Savings Bank, La Mesa, 1942
- Fremont Theater, San Luis Obispo, 1942
- Gamble House, Fullerton, 1940
- Golden Gate Theater, East Los Angeles, 1927
- Green's Cleaners, South Gate, 1940
- Hart Theatre, Ferndale, 1920
- Hayward City Hall, Hayward, 1930
- KIGS AM Radio Station, Hanford, 1947
- KPH Radio Station, Inverness, 1930
- King City High School Auditorium, King City, 1939
- Lark Theater, Larkspur, 1936
- Lido Restaurant, South Gate, 1941
- Livermore City Hall, Livermore, 1875 and 1937
- Loma Linda Foods Building, Riverside, 1937
- Los Baños del Mar, Los Alamos, 1939
- Marconi–RCA Transmitting Station, Bolinas, 1931
- Martinez Downtown Post Office, Martinez, 1939
- Martinez Library, Martinez, 1941
- Maywood City Hall, Maywood, 1938
- Metro Diner, Escondido, 1947
- Mitchell Real Estate Building, Grass Valley, 2008–2012
- Monterey County Court House, Monterey, 1937
- Mt. Whitney Hotel, Lindsay, 1929
- Napa Auto Parts, Mojave, 1940s
- New Weed Palace Theater, Weed, 1933
- Nevada City City Hall, Nevada City, 1937
- Nevada City Court House, Nevada City, 1937
- Niles Theater, Alturas, 1937
- Oceanside City Hall and Fire Station, Oceanside, 1929
- Orinda Theatre, Orinda
- Petersen's Service Station, Ferndale, 1930
- Point Hueneme Light, Santa Barbara Channel, 1941
- Pomona Fox Theater, Pomona, late 1920s
- Progress Building, Pomona, 1932
- Puente de Vida Church, Santa Paula, 1950
- Redding Fire House, Redding, 1939
- Richmond Shipyard Number Three Warehouse, Richmond, 1941
- Ritz Building, Eureka
- Rosenberg's Department Store, Santa Rosa, 1937
- Salinas Californian Building, Salinas, 1949
- San Gabriel Union Church and School, San Gabriel, 1936
- San Luis Obispo County Courthouse, San Luis Obispo, 1940
- Santa Anita Park, Arcadia, 1934
- Santa Cruz Civic Auditorium, Santa Cruz, 1939
- Sebastiani Theatre, Sonoma, 1934
- Senator Theater, Chico, 1928
- Shell Gas Station, La Grange, 1925
- Ship of the Desert, Palm Springs, 1936
- State Theatre, Red Bluff, 1946s
- Sterling Cleaners, Burlingame, 1926
- Sutter Creek Theatre, Sutter Creek, 1919
- Tate's Tea Room/Carlos Club, San Carlos, 1947
- Thurlow Medical Building, Santa Rosa, 1940
- Torrance High School Auditorium, Torrance, 1924
- Torrance Public Library, Torrance, 1936
- Town & Country Center, Palm Springs, 1948
- Tulare Union High School Auditorium and Administration Building, Tulare, 1937
- Ukiah Main Post Office, Ukiah, 1938
- United States Post Office Gardena Boulevard, Gardena
- United States Post Office Lancaster, Lancaster, 1940
- United States Post Office Porterville, Porterville, 1937
- United States Post Office-Santa Barbara Main, Santa Barbara, 1937
- Urho Saari Swim Stadium, El Segundo, 1940
- Val Vita Food Products, Fullerton, 1939
- Veterans Memorial Building, Corning, 1930s
- Washington Firehouse, West Sacramento

== See also ==
- List of Art Deco architecture
- List of Art Deco architecture in the United States
- PWA Moderne in California
