= List of Californio people =

List of Californio people, the Californios (singular Californio) are Hispanic Californians, especially those descended from Spanish and Mexican settlers of the 17th through 19th centuries before California was annexed by the United States.

== Californios families ==
- Ávila family of California
- Berryessa family of California
- Boronda family of California
- Careaga family of California
- Carrillo family of California
- Estudillo family of California
- Guerra family of California
- Lugo family of California
- Pico family of California
- Sepúlveda family of California

== In art, entertainment, and writing ==
Californio in art, entertainment, and writing
Name	Image	Birth, death	Birthplace	Occupation	Notes
Lester D. Boronda		1886–1953	Reno, Nevada, U.S.	genre painter, sculptor, furniture designer	
Leo Carrillo		1880–1961	Los Angeles, California, U.S.	actor	Hollywood move actor and nature conservationist, namesake of Leo Carrillo State Park
Angustias de la Guerra		1815–1890	San Diego, Alta California, Viceroyalty of New Spain (now California, U.S.)	women's rights activist, writer	one of the first writers of Californian history
José Figueroa		1792–1835		writer, military leader, politician	General and the Mexican Governor of Alta California from 1833 to 1835; author of the first book published in California and Governor of Alta California
William Gaxton		1893–1963	San Francisco, California, U.S.	actor	Vaudeville actor, and president of The Lambs Club
Myrtle Gonzalez		1891–1918	Los Angeles, California, U.S.	actress	silent-era movie actress
Alejandro Murguía		born 1949		poet, short story writer, editor, teacher	Poet Laureate of San Francisco in 2012
Esteban Munrás		1798–1850	Barcelona, Spain	painter	religious fresco painter
Agustín V. Zamorano		1798–1842	Spanish Florida	military personnel, publisher, printmaker	first person to bring a printing press to California and the first publisher in California

== In law, military, and politics ==
Californios in law and politics
Name	Image	Birth, death	Birthplace	Occupation	Notes
Cristobal Aguilar		1816–1886	Alta California, Viceroyalty of New Spain (now California, U.S.)	politician, journalist	three-term Mayor of Los Angeles
Juan Bautista Alvarado		1809–1882	Monterey, Alta California, Viceroyalty of New Spain (now California, U.S.)	politician	served as Governor of Alta California from 1837 to 1842
José María Alviso		1798–1853	Santa Clara, Province of Las Californias, Viceroyalty of New Spain (now California, U.S.)	politician, ranchero, soldier	Alcalde of San José (mayor) in 1836 and was the rancho grantee for Rancho Milpitas; founder of Milpitas, California
Modesta Ávila		1867–1891	San Juan Capistrano, California, U.S.	ranchera, protester, folk hero	first convicted felon and first state prisoner in Orange County, California
Juan Bandini		1800–1859	Lima, Viceroyalty of Peru (now Peru)	politician, ranchero	known for his role in the development of San Diego, California in the mid-19th century
Juana Briones de Miranda		c. 1802 – 1889	Villa de Branciforte, Alta California, Viceroyalty of New Spain (now Santa Cruz), California	ranchera, medical practitioner, merchant	founding mother of San Francisco, California, and Mayfield, California (now Palo Alto, California)
Carlos Antonio Carrillo		1783–1852	Santa Barbara, Province of Las Californias, Viceroyalty of New Spain	politician, military officer,ranchero	serve as Governor of Alta California from 1837 to 1838
José Antonio Carrillo		1796–1862	Santa Barbara, Province of Las Californias, Viceroyalty of New Spain (now California, U.S.)	politician, ranchero	signer of the California Constitution in 1849; served three terms as Alcalde of Los Angeles (mayor)
Juan José Carrillo		1842–1916	Santa Barbara, Department of the Californias, Centralist Republic of Mexico (now California, U.S.)	politician, judge	Mayor of Santa Monica and as the last City Marshal of Los Angeles, California
Gil Cisneros		born 1971	Los Angeles, California, U.S.	politician	
Antonio F. Coronel		1817–1894	Mexico City, Viceroyalty of New Spain (now Mexico)	politician, ranchero	served as Mayor of Los Angeles and California State Treasurer
Ygnacio Coronel		1795–1862	Mexico City, Viceroyalty of New Spain (now Mexico)	politician, ranchero, military personnel	member of the Los Angeles Common Council
José M. Covarrubias		c. 1809–1870	France	politician	signer of the Californian Constitution and California State Assemblyman, Mayor of Santa Barbara
Francisco de Haro		1792–1849	Compostela, New Kingdom of Galicia, New Spain (now Nayarit, Mexico)	politician	first Mayor of San Francisco
Antonio María de la Guerra		1825–1881	Santa Barbara, Alta California	politician, military officer	Mayor of Santa Barbara and California State Senator
Pablo de la Guerra		1819–1874	Santa Barbara, Alta California, Viceroyalty of New Spain (now California, U.S.)	politician	Lieutenant Governor of California, a California State Senator, and signer of the Californian Constitution
José de la Guerra y Noriega		1779–1858	Novales, Cantabria, Spain	military leader, ranchero	Commandant of the Presidio of Santa Barbara, the Presidio of San Diego, and the Presidio of Monterey
Reginaldo Francisco del Valle		1854–1938	Los Angeles, California, U.S.	politician, lawyer	youngest ever President pro tem of the California Senate, and founder of UCLA
Ygnacio del Valle		1808–1880	New Kingdom of Galicia, New Spain (now Jalisco, Mexico)	politician, ranchero	owned much of the Santa Clarita Valley, Mayor of Los Angeles, and a California State Assemblyman
Miguel de Pedrorena		1808–1850	Madrid, Spain	politician, ranchero, merchant	Mayor of San Diego and signer of the Californian Constitution
Manuel Dominguez		1803–1882	San Diego, Alta California, Viceroyalty of New Spain (now California, U.S.)	politician, ranchero	signer of the California Constitution, Mayor of Los Angeles, founder of San Pedro neighborhood, Carson, and Compton; namesake of CSU Dominguez Hills, and Rancho Dominguez
José Antonio Estudillo		1803–1852	Monterey, Province of Las Californias, Viceroyalty of New Spain (California, U.S.)	politician, ranchero, soldier	Mayor of San Diego, and first San Diego County Assessor
José Guadalupe Estudillo		1838–1917	San Diego, Department of the Californias, Centralist Republic of Mexico (now California, U.S.)	politician	California State Treasurer
José Joaquín Estudillo		1800–1852	Monterey, Alta California, Viceroyalty of New Spain (now California, U.S.)	politician, ranchero	2nd Alcalde of San Francisco (mayor)
José María Estudillo		unknown–1830		military officer, ranchero	Commandant of the Presidio of San Diego
Lucretia del Valle Grady		1892–1972	Los Angeles, California, U.S.	political activist, suffragette, actress	vice-chair of the Democratic National Committee, women's suffrage activist
Sam Liccardo		born 1970	Saratoga, California, U.S.	politician	Mayor of San Jose
José Matías Moreno		1819–1869	Baja California Sur, Viceroyalty of New Spain (now Mexico)	politician, ranchero	secretary of state under Pío Pico
José de Jesús Noé		1805–1862		politician, soldier, ranchero	7th and 12th Alcalde of San Francisco (mayor); last Californio to serve as Mayor of San Francisco
Agustín Olvera		1820–1876		politician, judge	first elected judge in Los Angeles and namesake of Calle Olvera (Olvera Street)
María Soledad Ortega de Argüello		1797–1874	Santa Barbara, Province of Las Californias, Viceroyalty of New Spain (now California, U.S.)	ranchera, socialite	early developer of Redwood City
Francisco Pérez Pacheco		1790–1860	Guadalajara, Jalisco	politician, ranchero, soldier	member of the Provincial Deputation of Alta California
Romualdo Pacheco		1831–1899	Santa Barbara, Alta California, First Mexican Empire (now California, U.S.)	politician, diplomat	only Hispanic to serve as Governor of California since the U.S. conquest
Salvio Pacheco		1793–1876	Monterey, Province of Las Californias, Viceroyalty of New Spain (now California, U.S.)	politician, ranchero soldier	Mayor of San Jose, founder of Concord, California
Andrés Pico		1810–1876	San Diego, Alta California, Viceroyalty of New Spain (now California, U.S.)	politician, ranchero, military leader	leader of the Californio forces during the American conquest of California
Antonio María Pico		1808–1869	Monterey, Alta California, Viceroyalty of New Spain (now California, U.S.)	politician, ranchero	Mayor of San Jose, signer of the Californian Constitution
Pío Pico		1801–1894	Mission San Gabriel Arcángel, San Gabriel, Alta California, New Spain (now California, U.S.)	politician, ranchero, entrepreneur	last Mexican Governor of Alta California and namesake of Pico Rivera
Ygnacio Sepúlveda		1842–1916	Pueblo de Los Ángeles, Alta California, Viceroyalty of New Spain (now California, U.S.)	politician, judge	first judge of the Los Angeles County Superior Court
Antonio Suñol		1797–1865	Barcelona, Spain	politician, businessman, ranchero	Mayor of San Jose, and namesake of Sunol, California
Bernardo Yorba		1800–1858	San Diego, Province of Las Californias, Viceroyalty of New Spain (now California, U.S.)	politician, ranchero, landowner	Mayor of Santa Ana, and namesake of Yorba Linda, California

== In religion ==
Californios in religion
Name	Image	Birth, death	Birthplace	Occupation	Notes
Joseph Sadoc Alemany		1853–1884	Vic, Catalonia, Spain	Spanish Catholic clergyman	the first Bishop of Monterey (1850–1853) and then as Archbishop of San Francisco (1853–1884)
Juan Crespí		1721–1782	Palma de Mallorca, Spain	Franciscan missionary, explorer	Padre-Presidente of the Californian Missions, explorer of Las Californias
Fermín de Lasuén		1736–1803	Vitoria, Basque Country, Spain	Basque Franciscan missionary	founder of nine of the twenty-one Spanish missions in California
Apolinaria Lorenzana		1793–1884	Mexico City, Mexico	teacher, matron, religious leader, nurse	
José González Rubio		1804–1875	Guadalajara, Jalisco, Mexico	Roman Catholic friar	last Apostolic Administrator of the Californias
Junípero Serra		1713–1784	Petra, Majorca, Spain	Catholic priest, Franciscan missionary	founder of eight of the twenty-one Spanish missions in California

== See also ==
- List of governors of California before 1850
- List of people associated with the California Gold Rush
- History of California before 1900
