= Plaza de la Guerra =

Public plaza in Santa Barbara, California

- De la Guerra Plaza
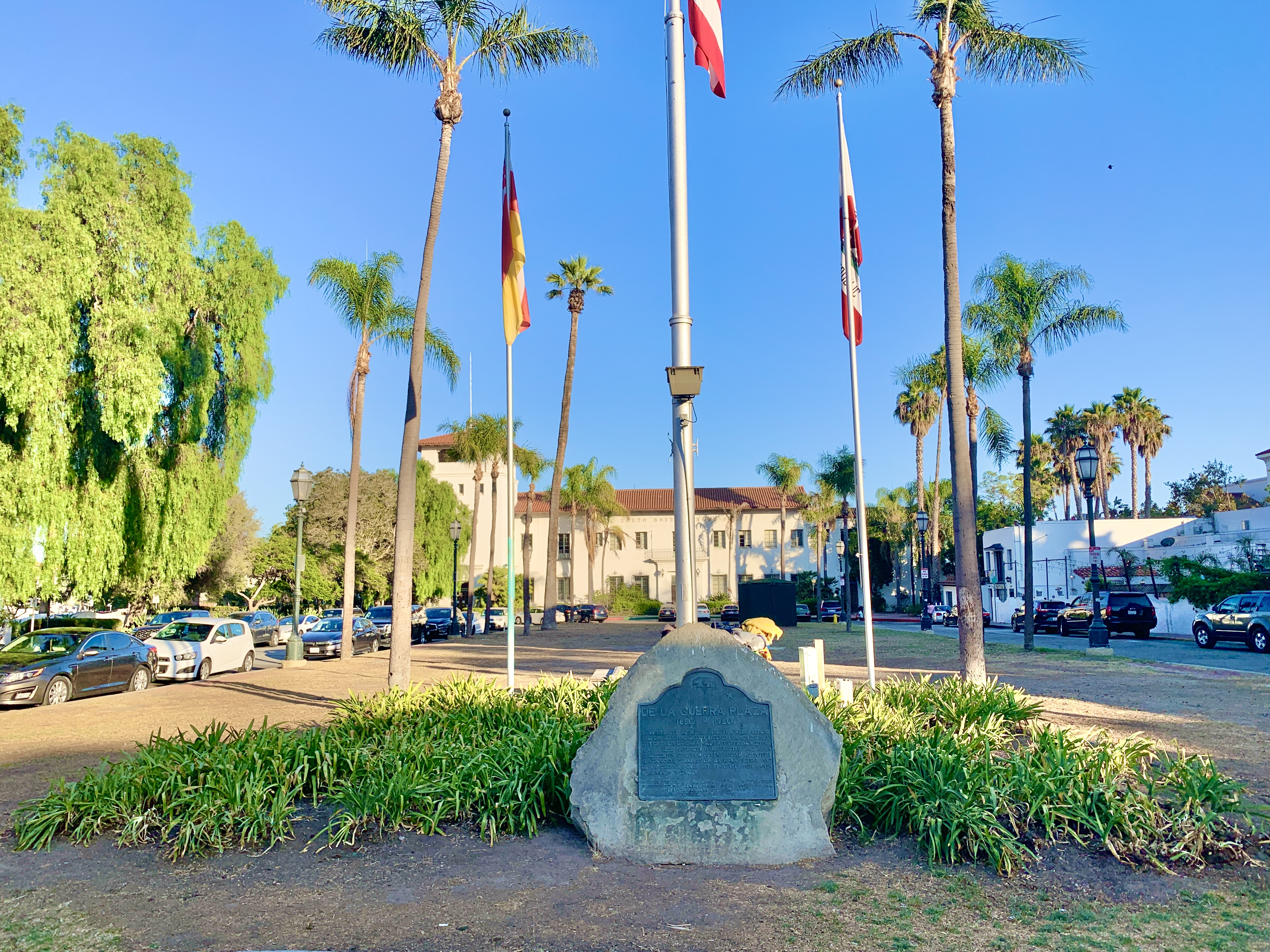
- Plaza de la Guerra, with Santa Barbara City Hall in the background.
- Interactive map of Plaza de la Guerra
- Type: Urban plaza
- Location: De la Guerra Street between State and Anacapa Streets, Santa Barbara, California
- Coordinates: 34°25′11″N 119°41′55″W
- Created: 1853 (as public square)
- Etymology: de la Guerra family
- Owner: City of Santa Barbara
- Operator: City of Santa Barbara Parks and Recreation Department
- Status: Open; redesign under environmental review (as of 2026)

The plaza seen during Old Spanish Days Fiesta in August 2023.

Plaza de la Guerra, also called De la Guerra Plaza, is a public plaza in downtown Santa Barbara, California, at the center of the city's civic district. It is bordered by Santa Barbara City Hall to the east, the Casa de la Guerra adobe to the south and the Santa Barbara News-Press building to the west. The plaza takes its name from the de la Guerra family, whose patriarch, José de la Guerra y Noriega, built the Casa de la Guerra on its south side in the 1820s. It has been a gathering place since the Spanish and Mexican eras. In 1853 the Common Council set it aside as the city's first public square and it is now a principal venue for the Old Spanish Days Fiesta. Since 2019 the city has been planning a redesign that would remove the parking and make the plaza mainly pedestrian.

== History ==
=== Spanish and Mexican eras ===
José de la Guerra y Noriega, commandant of the Presidio of Santa Barbara, built his family's adobe house in the 1820s. The open ground in front of it became one of the town's main social spaces. In the Spanish and Mexican periods the plaza was often the scene of dances, fiestas and bullfights. The State of California's historical landmark marker for the Casa de la Guerra calls the plaza the "scene of early Santa Barbara fiestas". It says the de la Guerra family's hospitality "set standards for Santa Barbara".

=== City square (1850–1920) ===
According to the state landmark marker, the newly elected Common Council of the City of Santa Barbara held its first official meeting near the site in 1850, two weeks before California statehood. In 1853 the council declared the plaza the first city property "hereby constituted and set aside forever" as a "City Square and Promenade". Francisco de la Guerra, a son of José, was mayor at the time.

In 1875 the city built its first City Hall in the middle of the plaza and the area became the center of municipal government. The plaza also held the city's fire house and jail.

=== 1920s reconstruction ===
In the early 1920s Santa Barbara's civic leaders set out to restore the plaza as open space and give the city a unified Spanish-style civic center. In 1922 voters approved, by six to one, a bond measure to build a new City Hall on the plaza's east side and clear the old building from the center. Restoration of the plaza began in September 1921 and after the old City Hall was demolished, the center of the plaza was graded and planted with grass inside the existing concrete curbs. The plaza's current lawn dates from that time.

Also in 1922, the Sepúlveda Adobe at the plaza's west end was demolished to make way for the Santa Barbara Daily News building, designed by George Washington Smith for publisher Thomas M. Storke in the Spanish Colonial Revival style. Storke merged the Daily News with the Morning Press in 1932 to form the Santa Barbara News-Press, which was based in the building until 2023. The building was enlarged in 1951. Also from 1922, developer Bernhard Hoffmann, by arrangement with the de la Guerra family, restored the Casa de la Guerra and built the El Paseo shopping arcade behind it.

=== Later 20th century ===
During Old Spanish Days each August it hosts one of the festival's mercados (open-air markets), with food booths and music. Over time the ring of road around the lawn came to be used mostly for parking.

=== News-Press building ===
In 2015 the City Council designated the News-Press building a City Landmark. Its owner, Wendy McCaw, did not oppose the designation. On May 1, 2023, the newspaper moved its remaining staff out of the building to its printing plant in Goleta. The paper stopped publishing that July when its parent company, Ampersand Publishing, filed for bankruptcy. The building at 715 Anacapa Street was owned by a separate McCaw company and was not part of the bankruptcy.

== Revitalization project ==
In 2019 the city held public workshops on the plaza's future. Most participants favored removing or restricting parking and vehicle traffic. The City Council created a De la Guerra Plaza Revitalization Advisory Committee and hired a local design group to present design concepts to the committee. The council later approved design contracts of about $865,000 for architecture and design and $66,000 for lighting.

The proposed design would raise the plaza and the block of De la Guerra Street between State and Anacapa Streets to a single level surface, making the plaza primarily for pedestrians and able to serve as a civic gathering space. It would also add new landscaping, a water feature and a mosaic honoring the Chumash people. Replacing much of the historic lawn with paving was controversial. The city's historic review identified the plaza's pepper tree, palm and adobe wall as features to preserve. The city's Parks and Recreation Commission approved removing 49 trees for the project.

In October 2024 the city issued a notice that it would prepare an environmental impact report under the California Environmental Quality Act and it held a public scoping meeting on November 14, 2024.

== Surroundings ==
- Santa Barbara City Hall - on the east side, built after the 1922 bond measure.
- Casa de la Guerra - on the south side, the 1820s adobe home of the de la Guerra family. It is a California Historical Landmark (No. 307) and a historic house museum run by the Santa Barbara Trust for Historic Preservation.
- Santa Barbara News-Press building - on the west side, designed by George Washington Smith in 1922 and a City Landmark since 2015. The building has been vacant since the News-Press filed for bankruptcy in 2023.
- El Paseo - the 1920s shopping arcade behind the Casa, listed on the National Register of Historic Places together with the Casa as "El Paseo and Casa de la Guerra".

== See also ==
- History of Santa Barbara, California
- Guerra family of California
- José de la Guerra y Noriega
- Pablo de la Guerra
- Antonio Maria de la Guerra
- Old Spanish Days Fiesta
- State Street (Santa Barbara)
