= Guerra family of California =

Californio family

Guerra family of California Familia de la Guerra
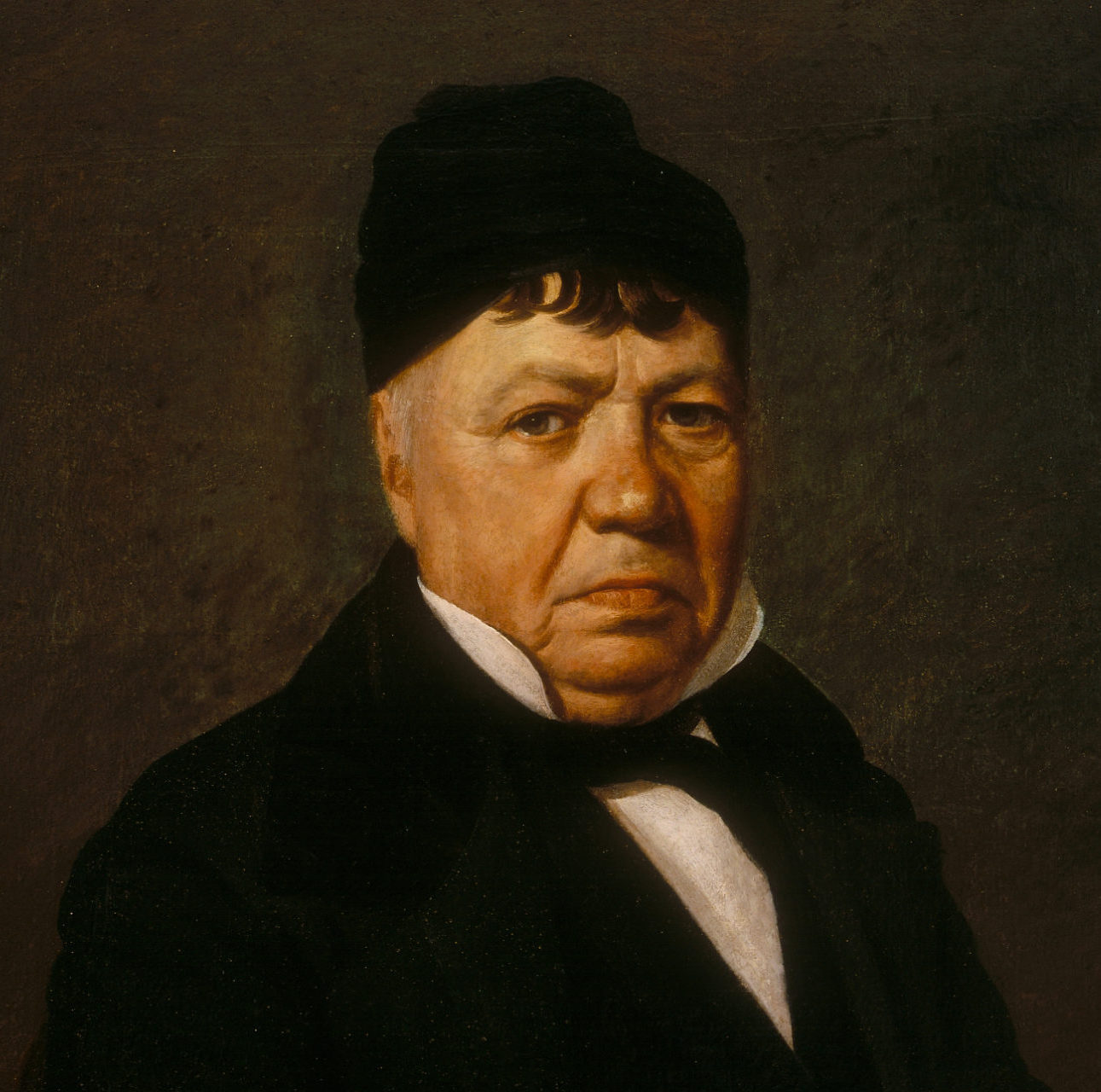
- José de la Guerra y Noriega founder of the family
- Current region: Alta California; Southern California
- Founded: 1804 (marriage of José de la Guerra and María Antonia Carrillo)
- Founder: José de la Guerra y Noriega
- Members: Pablo de la Guerra; Antonio Maria de la Guerra; Angustias de la Guerra; Francisco de la Guerra
- Connected families: Carrillo family
- Estates: Casa de la Guerra, Santa Barbara; Rancho Simi; Rancho Las Posas; Rancho San Julian; Rancho Los Alamos; Rancho El Conejo; Rancho Nicasio

The Guerra family is a prominent Californio family of Southern California. Members of the family held extensive rancho grants and numerous important positions, including numerous mayors of Santa Barbara, California Senators, a Lieutenant Governor of California, and a signer of the California Constitution.

== Notable members ==
=== José de la Guerra ===
José de la Guerra y Noriega, born in 1779, is the founder of the family. Popularly known as El Capitán, he came to California in 1793. He enlisted in 1798, serving over 52 years in military service. He served as acting Commandant of the Presidio of Monterey in 1804, Commandant of the Presidio of San Diego from 1806 to 1807, and most notably as Commandant of the Presidio of Santa Barbara, from 1827 to 1842. He married María Antonia Carrillo, of the Carrillo family of California, in 1804; they had thirteen children. He came to own numerous ranchos in the region, including Rancho Simi, Rancho Las Posas, Rancho San Julian, Rancho Los Alamos and Rancho El Conejo.

=== Pablo de la Guerra ===
Pablo de la Guerra was born in 1819 in Santa Barbara. He was appointed as Tax Collector for Santa Barbara in 1838. In 1849, he represented Santa Barbara at the California Constitutional Convention in Monterey and was one of the signers of the Constitution of California. He served as a California Senator, from 1851 to 1861, and as acting Lieutenant Governor of California from 1861 to 1862. From 1863 until his death in 1874, he served as a district judge for California's 17th Judicial District. He was granted Rancho Nicasio in 1844.

=== Antonio M. de la Guerra ===
Antonio Maria de la Guerra was born in 1825 in Santa Barbara. He served in the California Senate from 1851 to 1852 and twice as Mayor of Santa Barbara, from 1856 to 1858 and 1859 to 1864. He served on the Santa Barbara County Board of Supervisors for several terms, including one as chairman. He died in Goleta in 1881. He commanded a company of the 1st California Cavalry Battalion during the Civil War.

=== Angustias de la Guerra ===
Angustias de la Guerra was born in San Diego in 1815. In 1833, she married Manuel Jimeno Casarín, who served as secretary of state under Governors Juan Bautista Alvarado and Governor Manuel Micheltorena. Following the death of her first husband, she married U.S. Army officer James L. Ord. In 1871, she visited both American president Ulysses S. Grant, at the White House, and Mexican president Benito Juárez at Chapultepec Castle. During the Monterey Constitutional Convention of 1849, she and her husband hosted the large Californio delegation to the convention. She was an instrumental force in defending women's property rights in the California Constitution. She later devoted herself to the study of Californian history. In 1878, she wrote the seminal "Ocurrencias en California" (translated into English as "Occurrences in Hispanic California" and as "California Recollections of Angustias de la Guerra"), considered to be one of the most important early accounts on Californian history.

=== Other members ===
- Francisco de la Guerra, who served three terms as Mayor of Santa Barbara (1850 to 1851, 1852 to 1854, 1866 to 1870)
- Joaquín de la Guerra, who served one term as Mayor of Santa Barbara (1854 to 1855)
- Pablo de la Guerra, who served one term as Mayor of Santa Barbara (1855)
- José Antonio "El Chato" de la Guerra, who served as Sheriff of San Luis Obispo County (1865 to 1871)

== Legacy ==
Numerous locations in Santa Barbara are named after members of the family, including Plaza de la Guerra, De la Guerra Street, and Paseo de la Guerra.

Casa de la Guerra, the family's ancestral home in Santa Barbara, is a National Historic Landmark.

== See also ==
- List of Californios people
