= Los Alamos Ranch House =

- U.S. National Register of Historic Places
- U.S. National Historic Landmark
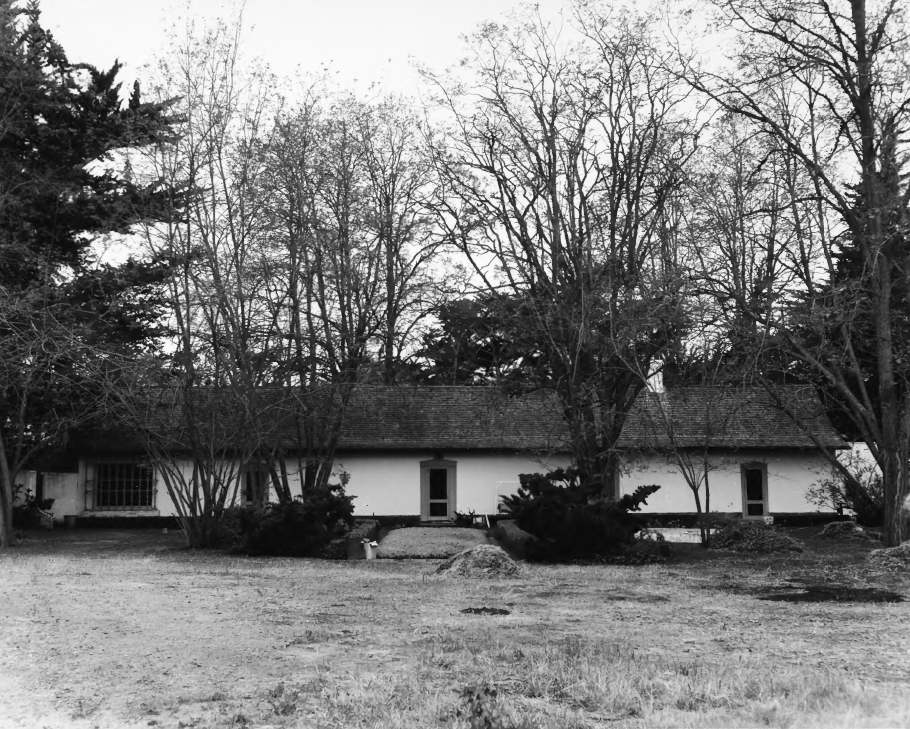
- 1968 Park Service photo

- Location within California Location within the United States
- Nearest city: Los Alamos, California
- Coordinates: 34°45′10″N 120°19′20″W
- Area: 800 acres (320 ha)
- Built: 1840
- NRHP reference No.: 70000148

Significant dates
- Added to NRHP: April 15, 1970
- Designated NHL: April 15, 1970

The Los Alamos Ranch House is a historic adobe house near Los Alamos in northern Santa Barbara County, California. The house, the centerpiece of Rancho Los Alamos, was built about 1840, and is one of the best-preserved examples of domestic architecture from California's Mexican period. The building was designated a National Historic Landmark in 1970.

== Description ==
The Los Alamos Ranch House is located on the south side of California State Route 135, about 3 miles (4.8 km) west of the town of Los Alamos. It is a single-story structure, built out of locally made adobe bricks. It is in a relatively unspoiled rural setting that has changed fairly little since the house was built about 1840. The house has thick walls, with mostly original window and door openings, and is covered by a gabled roof. Its interior features include a number of American adaptations, including wood plank flooring and ceilings, and paneled wooden doors.

== History ==
Rancho Los Alamos originated as a Mexican land grant given in 1839 to José Antonio de la Guerra, the son of the Commandant José de la Guerra y Noriega of the Presidio of Santa Barbara. The grant of nearly 49,000 acres (200 km^{2}) was one of a large number of such grants made by the Mexican government in the 1830s. The house was built by Chumash natives who lived on the rancho, trading their labor for goods and food. It was a common stopping point on what was then the main road between Santa Barbara and Monterey, now Route 135.

De la Guerra was able reconfirm his ownership of the land grant after California became a state, but it failed due to a decline in the price of beef, extended drought, and flooding. In 1876, Thomas Bell, John S. Bell, and James Shaw, purchased 14,000 acres (57 km^{2}) of land, part from Rancho Los Alamos and part from the adjacent Rancho La Laguna, from which they then set aside the town site of Los Alamos. The area prospered agriculturally, suffering a decline in the 1930s when the railroad ended service to Los Alamos.

The ranch house now stands on a much reduced property, and is private property.

== See also ==
- List of Ranchos of California
- Pablo de la Guerra
- Antonio Maria de la Guerra
- List of National Historic Landmarks in California
