= Paseo de la Guerra =

Historic shopping arcade in Santa Barbara, California

- El Paseo and Casa de la Guerra
- U.S. National Register of Historic Places
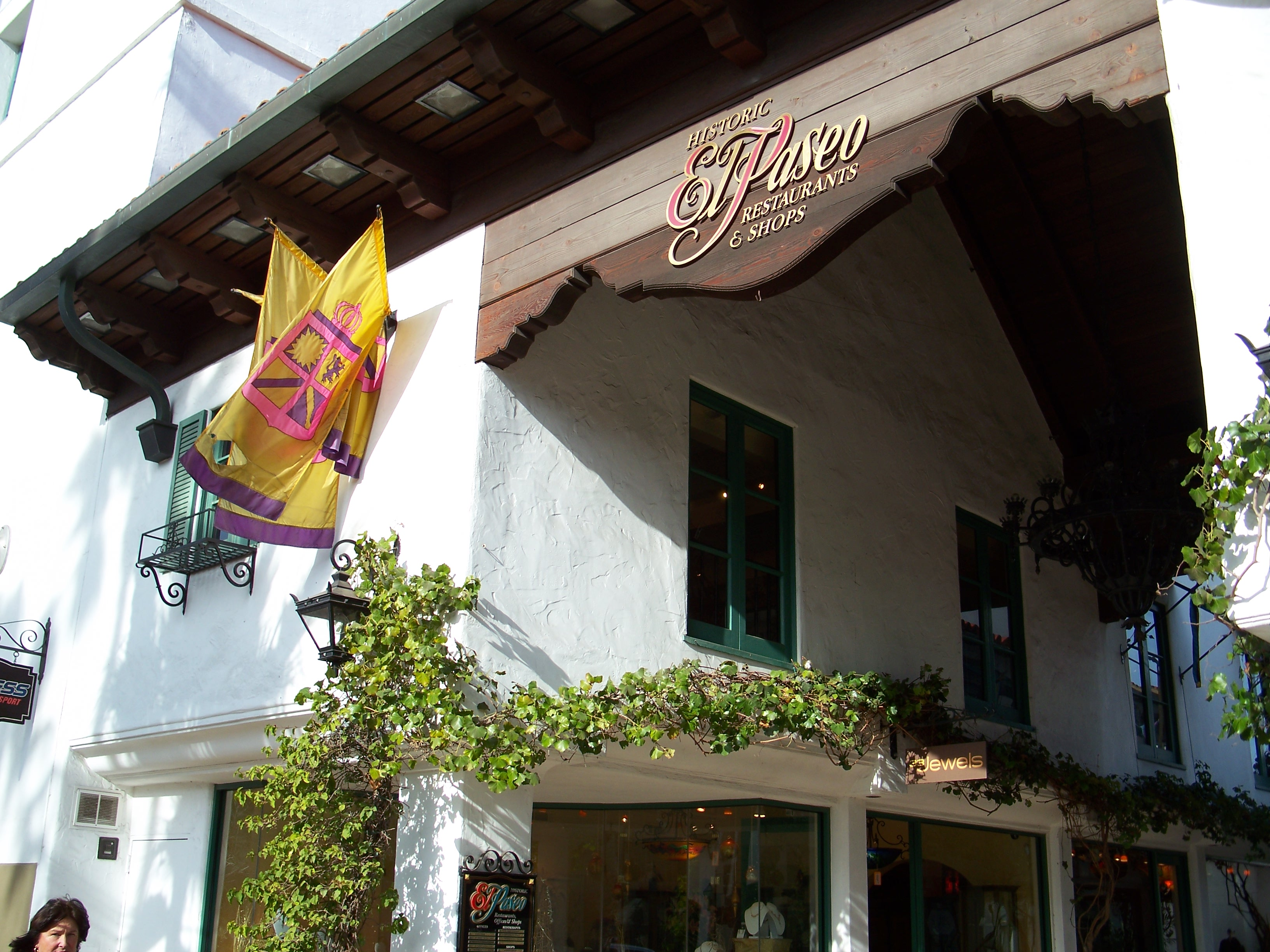
- A passage in El Paseo

- Location within southern California
- Location: 808–818 State St., 813–819 Anacapa St. and 9–25 E. De la Guerra St., Santa Barbara, California
- Coordinates: 34°25′12.19″N 119°41′59.21″W
- Area: 1.7 acres (0.69 ha)
- Built: 1819–1827 (Casa); 1922–1929 (El Paseo)
- Architects: James Osborne Craig; Carleton Winslow; George Washington Smith; Lutah Maria Riggs
- Architectural style: Spanish Colonial; Spanish Colonial Revival
- NRHP reference No.: 77000346
- Added to NRHP: February 2, 1977

Paseo de la Guerra, usually called El Paseo, is a complex of shops, restaurants and offices built in the 1920s around and behind the Casa de la Guerra adobe in downtown Santa Barbara, California. It occupies most of the block bounded by State Street, De la Guerra Street and Anacapa Street, opposite the public square Plaza de la Guerra. Developer Bernhard Hoffmann began building it in 1922 by arrangement with the de la Guerra family with help from architect James Osborne Craig who modeled its central passage, known as the "Street in Spain", on a village street in Andalusia. El Paseo and the restored Casa were among the first Spanish Colonial Revival projects in Santa Barbara. After the 1925 Santa Barbara earthquake they served as models for rebuilding the city's downtown. The complex and the Casa were listed together on the National Register of Historic Places in 1977 as "El Paseo and Casa de la Guerra".

== History ==
José de la Guerra y Noriega, commandant of the Presidio of Santa Barbara, built the Casa de la Guerra as his family home in the 1820s. His descendants lived there until 1943. Beginning in 1922, by arrangement with the de la Guerra family, Bernhard Hoffmann began building the El Paseo complex onto the back of the Casa de la Guerra. He also turned two wings of the house into shops. Hoffmann, a leading figure in the city's movement for Spanish-style architecture, also led the restoration of the Casa to its earlier appearance.

Scottish-born architect James Osborne Craig, who had designed the Hoffmanns' own house, prepared the first plans. After Craig died in 1922, Carleton Winslow carried his plans forward. George Washington Smith and his associate Lutah Maria Riggs also designed parts of the complex.

The 1925 Santa Barbara earthquake destroyed most of the commercial buildings on State Street but spared El Paseo. The city rebuilt its downtown largely in the Spanish Colonial Revival style already used at El Paseo and the Casa.

In 1971 El Paseo and the Casa de la Guerra were given to the Santa Barbara Trust for Historic Preservation. The Trust sold El Paseo in 1989 but kept the Casa. It also holds a historic preservation easement on parts of El Paseo, including the Ranchero Room. Between 1992 and 2006 the Trust restored the Casa to its appearance in the early 1800s and now runs the house as a museum.

The El Paseo restaurant, one of the oldest in Santa Barbara, has operated in the complex since 1923. In the 2010s offices and several wine-tasting rooms replaced many of the older shops.

== Architecture ==
El Paseo is a network of passages and courtyards set behind the street fronts of the block, linking State Street, De la Guerra Street and Anacapa Street on foot. The Casa de la Guerra faces De la Guerra Street, across from Plaza de la Guerra. The complex's address range, given in its National Register listing, covers 808–818 State Street, 813–819 Anacapa Street and 9–25 East De la Guerra Street.

== See also ==
- Casa de la Guerra
- Plaza de la Guerra
- Guerra family of California
- José de la Guerra y Noriega
- Spanish Colonial Revival architecture
- National Register of Historic Places listings in Santa Barbara County, California
