= Alfred Robinson (businessman) =

American businessman and author (1806–1895)

Alfred Robinson (1806–1895), later known in Spanish as Don Alfredo Robinson, was a Californian author and businessman. Born in Massachusetts, Robinson immigrated to California (then a part of Mexico) in 1829, to work in the California hide trade. He published Life in California in 1846, an influential early description of Californian society prior to the U.S. Conquest of California.

== Biography ==
Alfred Robinson sailed to Alta California in 1829 in the employ of Bryant, Sturgis and Company, a Boston-based firm in the California hide and tallow trade. He married Anita de la Guerra de Noriega y Carrillo, of the locally prominent Guerra family of Santa Barbara. The marriage party is described by Richard Henry Dana Jr., in "Two Years Before the Mast".

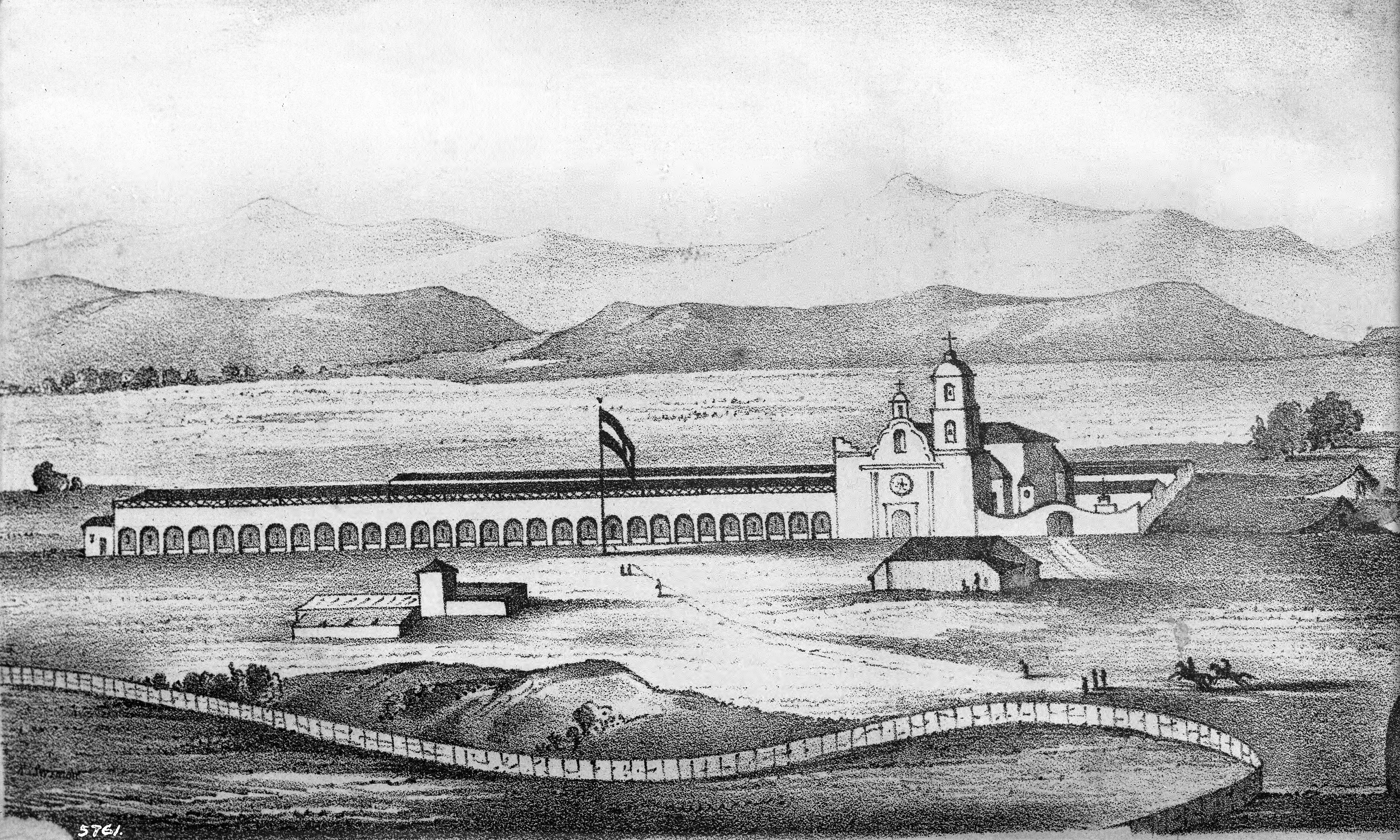
Drawing of Mission San Luis Rey taken from Life in California, ca.1839

After the Mexican Cession, and California was annexed by the U.S. in 1848 and became a state in 1850, Robinson worked for the Pacific Mail Steamship Company, and as a land manager during the 1850s through the 1880s.

=== Robinson Trust ===
In 1868, he formed the Robinson Trust with Abel Stearns, the most important land owner in Southern California in Los Angeles County. The real estate sales partnership included four San Francisco investors; Samuel Brannan, E. F. Northam, Charles B. Polhemus, Edward Martin. The era of the large cattle ranchos was on the way out. In its place came agriculture, as ranchos were broken up and generally sold in 40-acre (160,000 m^{2}) farms and ranches. The Trust acted as sales agents for the subdivisions. In order to gain maximum coverage for their campaign, they linked themselves to the 'California Immigrant Union' and helped guide that organization's sales pitches.

Alfred Robinson died in San Francisco in 1895.

== Californios and California Mission Indians ==
=== Book ===
In 1846, Alfred Robinson published Life in California, a comparatively sympathetic portrait of the lifeways and Californios political vicissitudes of the region under the Mexican Republic. The book subsequently went through several reprintings.

Equally important with Robinson's own descriptions was that he appended to it a lengthy ethnographic description of the Juaneño - Acagchemem Native American Mission Indians, and Chinigchinix, at Mission San Juan Capistrano written in the 1820s by the Franciscan missionary Jerónimo Boscana.

=== Archives ===
Robinson's unpublished papers are on file at the California Historical Society library in San Francisco, and at the University of California, Berkeley.

== See also ==
- Casa de la Guerra
  - José de la Guerra y Noriega
  - Pablo de la Guerra
  - Antonio Maria de la Guerra
- Category: Native American history of California
- Stephen Powers - "Tribes of California" 1876
