= Angustias de la Guerra =

American historian (1815–1890)

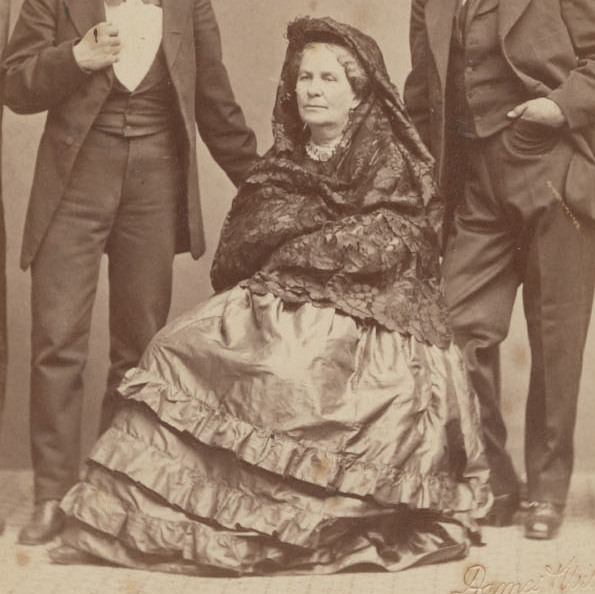
- Angustias de la Guerra c. 1885
- Born: 1815; San Diego, California
- Died: 1890 (aged 74–75); San Francisco, California
- Burial place: Mission Santa Barbara
- Occupations: Historian, socialite
- Spouse(s): Manuel Jimeno Casarín (1833–1853); James L. Ord (1856–1875)

María de las Angustias de la Guerra, known simply as Angustias de la Guerra, (June 11, 1815 – June 21, 1890) was Californio historian and socialite. A member of the prominent Guerra family of California, she played an important role in defending women's property rights in the California Constitution while it was being drafted during the Monterey Constitutional Convention of 1849. Her memoirs, "Ocurrencias en California" (translated into English as "Occurrences in California") is an important historical account of Californian history in the 19th century.

== Biography ==
The daughter of José de la Guerra y Noriega, known as "El Capitán", and María Antonia Carrillo, she was born in San Diego, Alta California; the Guerra family of California moved to Santa Barbara soon afterwards, where her father became commander of the Presidio. In 1833, she married Manuel Jimeno Casarín; the couple moved to Monterey, then the capital of Alta California, part of Mexico since 1821. Her husband was a member of the assembly, served as secretary of state; he died of cholera while visiting Mexico in 1853.

During the Monterey Constitutional Convention of 1849, she and her husband hosted the large Californio delegation to the convention. She was an instrumental force in defending women's property rights in the California Constitution.

In 1856, she married James L. Ord, a U.S. Army surgeon who was the grandson of King George IV; the couple settled in Santa Barbara. In 1871, they visited American president Ulysses S. Grant at the White House and Mexican president Benito Juárez at Chapultepec Castle. Their marriage was dissolved in 1875.

She died in San Francisco at the age of 75 and was buried in Colma then her remains were later moved to Santa Barbara.

== Legacy ==
Her book California Recollections of Angustias de la Guerra Ord: (Occurrences in Hispanic California), translated from the original Spanish, is an important record in the history of California. De la Guerra Ord's account emphasizes the important role of women in the described historical events. Her recollections also include a description of what have been the largest recorded earthquake and possible tsunami to hit central and southern California, as related to de la Guerra Ord by Father Luis Gil y Taboada.

She is described as a young girl in Richard Henry Dana's classic "Two Years Before the Mast." Her family home is considered an architectural landmark in Santa Barbara.
