= Rancho San Julian =

Land grant in California

Coordinates: 34.540°N 120.380°W

Rancho San Julian was a 48,222-acre (195.15 km^{2}) Mexican land grant and present-day ranch in present-day Santa Barbara County, California given in 1837 by Governor Juan B. Alvarado to José de la Guerra y Noriega. The grant name probably refers to José Antonio Julian de la Guerra. The grant was located west of present-day Santa Barbara.

== History ==
Known as the Rancho del Rey (Ranch of the King) under Spain, this land west of the Presidio of Santa Barbara served since 1816 as a presidial cattle grazing ground. The ranch was renamed Rancho Nacional by the Mexican authorities. In 1837, the six square league Rancho San Julian land grant was made by Governor Juan Bautista Alvarado to George Rock acting for José de la Guerra. The claim was later purchased, and the title perfected by de la Guerra. José de la Guerra (1779 – 1858) was Comandante of the Presidio of Santa Barbara from 1827 to 1842.

With the cession of Alta California to the United States following the Mexican-American War, the 1848 Treaty of Guadalupe Hidalgo provided that the land grants would be honored. As required by the Land Act of 1851, a claim for Rancho San Julian was filed with the Public Land Commission in 1852, and the grant was patented to José de la Guerra in 1873. The official survey was about double the area of the six square league grant.

De la Guerra died in 1858. Severe drought and financial burdens forced the de la Guerra family to mortgage the property to Gaspar Oreña (1824–1904). In 1854, Gaspar Oreña had married his cousin, Antonia María de la Guerra, youngest daughter of José de la Guerra, after her husband Cesario Armand Lataillade (1819–1849) died. Oreña acquired Rancho La Espada and Rancho San Julian from the de la Guerras in 1864, as partial payment for money owed him by the de la Guerra siblings. He held on to them until 1867 when he sold them both to the Dibblee-Hollister partnership.

Albert Dibblee (1816–1895), born Pine Plains, Dutchess County, New York came to California in 1848. In 1858 Dibblee bought Rancho Santa Anita, and in 1860 his brother, Thomas Bloodgood Dibblee (1823–1895), came from New York to join him. Albert Dibblee and Thomas Dibblee formed a partnership with Colonel W.W. Hollister (1818 - 1886) and bought several land grants in the Santa Barbara area, including Rancho San Julian. In 1868, Thomas Dibblee moved to Santa Barbara and married José de la Guerra's granddaughter, Francesca de la Guerra (1849-). Francesca was the daughter of Josefa Moreno and Pablo de la Guerra, who was the son of José de la Guerra.

Thomas Dibblee's grandson, Thomas Wilson Dibblee Jr., was a notable geologist.

As of 2023, Thomas and Francesca de la Guerra Dibblee's descendant Elizabeth Poett has filmed three seasons of a cooking show, Ranch to Table, on Rancho San Julian for the Magnolia Network, featuring scenes from the ranch.

== See also ==
- Ranchos of California
- List of Ranchos of California
