= Earl Warren Showgrounds =

Fairground and event venue in Santa Barbara, California

- Interactive map of Earl Warren Showgrounds
- Location: 3400 Calle Real; Santa Barbara, California
- Coordinates: 34°25′49″N 119°44′08″W
- Owner: State of California
- Operator: 19th District Agricultural Association
- Type: Fairground, equestrian and event center
- Acreage: 34 acres (14 ha)

Construction
- Built: 1958–1961
- Opened: 1958 (equestrian facility)

Website
- Official website

Earl Warren Showgrounds is a state-owned fairground and event center at 3400 Calle Real in Santa Barbara, California, at the corner of Las Positas Road beside U.S. Route 101. It is run by the 19th District Agricultural Association, a state agency under the California Department of Food and Agriculture. Originally built in the 1950s as the permanent home of the Santa Barbara National Horse and Flower Show, it is named for Earl Warren, who served as Attorney General of California, Governor of California and Chief Justice of the United States. Besides horse shows, the 34-acre (14 ha) site hosts the Santa Barbara Fair & Expo, concerts and private events. It is also one of Santa Barbara County's main emergency sites for wildfire crews and evacuated animals, serving as the incident command post for multiple large scale disasters in the region, including the Sherpa Fire, the Thomas Fire and the ensuing debris flow.

== History ==
=== Origins ===
The 19th District Agricultural Association staged the National Horse and Flower Show at Pershing Park near the beach in Santa Barbara starting in 1931 and through the 1940s. In 1950, the association chose a permanent site at Las Positas Road and Calle Real, and the state bought land there using funds raised by the horse show association. Sources differ on the size of the original purchase. The showgrounds' own history gives 136.5 acres while a KCLU report says a ranching family sold more than 170 acres to the association and the state. In 1955, the state authorized the 19th Agricultural District to plan and build a fairground for horse and flower shows.

The equestrian facility was completed in 1958 and hosted that year's National Horse and Flower Show. At the time, it was praised as one of the best and most modern horse show venues in the country. An exhibit building followed in 1959 and an administration building in 1961. A satellite wagering building for off-track horse-race betting was added in 1993. The grounds now cover about 34 acres.

=== Emergency use ===
The showgrounds is a designated evacuation site for large animals in Santa Barbara County and has served as a base and incident command post for firefighting crews led by the Santa Barbara County Fire Department:

- During the 2008 Gap Fire, the showgrounds served as command post.
- During the May 2009 Jesusita Fire, it became the headquarters for the firefight and a temporary camp for about 4,000 personnel.
- During the 2016 Sherpa Fire, the volunteer Santa Barbara Equine Assistance and Evacuation Team brought horses from threatened ranches to the grounds.
- During the December 2017 Thomas Fire, it sheltered more than 1,300 evacuated animals.

=== Finances and governance ===
The showgrounds is run by the 19th District Agricultural Association, an agency of the California Department of Food and Agriculture's Division of Fairs and Expositions. The association is governed by a volunteer board of directors appointed by the governor. The state no longer subsidizes the facility. KCLU reported that it could not afford needed renovations. Ben Sprague became chief executive in January 2019. In January 2020, the board approved a phased renovation of the equestrian facilities, funded with help from SB Equine Evac and private donors.

Plans for the grounds have repeatedly divided equestrian users and other community groups. In 2019, a proposal to add soccer fields set horse groups against a local soccer club. On March 23, 2023, the board adopted a new mission statement describing the site as a multi-use community event and emergency resiliency center. The statement dropped the previous commitment to "maintain[ing] a first-class equine facility".

=== Departure of the Fiesta rodeo ===
The Old Spanish Days Fiesta Stock Horse Show & Rodeo had been held at the showgrounds for 67 years. The fees Old Spanish Days paid to use the grounds rose by more than 120 percent between 2017 and 2024. When the two organizations could not agree on terms, the rodeo was not held at Earl Warren in 2025.

=== Master plan ===
In 2025, showgrounds staff released a draft 30-year master plan for the 34-acre site. It proposed replacing some paved parking with green space and adding three multi-use recreation fields, a fieldhouse, a covered arena for recreational and equestrian use, and a 6,000-seat arena. The plan did not include housing. Equestrian groups said they had not been consulted. In October 2025, the board voted unanimously to move forward with the plan, while saying it was far from final. The board later announced that it was "stepping back" from the plan's specific proposals. Sprague said the goal was a new plan that honored the site's legacy of horses, recreation and community service.

In 2026, management began standardizing rental agreements with all groups that use the grounds. It proposed charging SB Equine Evac $600 a month to store its emergency trailer which had previously been kept there rent-free. After a petition against the fee drew more than 800 signatures, the two sides signed a contract running to January 2027, and the trailer returned to the grounds on September 28, 2026.
