= Isaac N. Quinn =

American politician

Isaac N. Quinn

Isaac N. Quinn (April 24, 1795 – June 26, 1865) was the acting lieutenant governor of California, 1860–61.

== 1860 ==
President pro Tempore, California State Senate (for 17 days; succeeded by Charles J. Lansing) He was a Democrat.

== 1860-1861 ==
Acting Lieutenant Governor (following succession of John G. Downey to Governor).

== 1861 ==
Resigned as Lieutenant Governor on January 7.

Political offices
Preceded by John G. Downey; Lieutenant Governor	Acting Lieutenant Governor of California; 1860–1861	Succeeded by Pablo de la Guerra; Acting Lieutenant Governor
