= Casa de la Guerra =

Historic house in California, United States

- El Paseo and Casa de la Guerra
- U.S. National Register of Historic Places
- California Historical Landmark
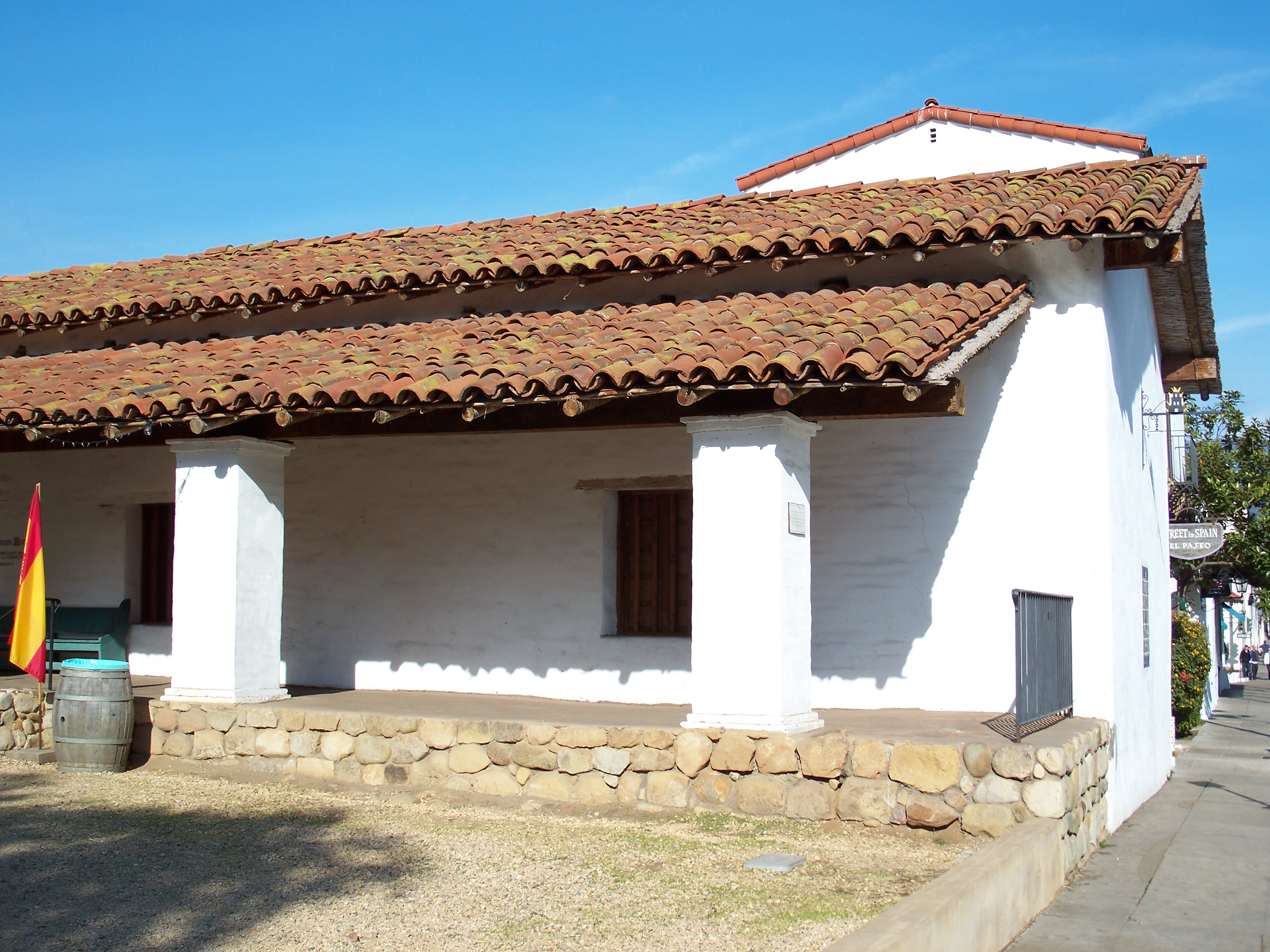
- A close-up photo of the northeastern part of the building

- Location within California Location within the United States
- Location: 808–818 State St., 813–819 Anacapa St., and 9–25 E. de la Guerra St., Santa Barbara, California
- Coordinates: 34°25′13″N 119°41′57″W
- Area: 1.7 acres (0.69 ha)
- Built: 1819
- Architectural style: Spanish Colonial
- NRHP reference No.: 77000346
- CHISL No.: 307
- Added to NRHP: February 2, 1977

The Casa de la Guerra was the residence of the fifth commandant of the Presidio de Santa Barbara, José de la Guerra y Noriega, founder of the Guerra family of California (a prominent Californio family) from 1828 until his death in 1858. Descendants of José lived in the home until 1943. The site is currently owned and operated by the Santa Barbara Trust for Historic Preservation as a historic house museum. The address is 15 East De la Guerra Street, Santa Barbara, California.

The time when José lived in the casa it was known to locals as the casa grande (big house), as the thirteen room structure dwarfed the surrounding one room adobes. In the casa grande period, José added the altito structure. The altito structure no longer stands, but acted as José's office and was where he stored his money.

The 1857 Fort Tejon earthquake did significant damage to the residence, and due to José's declining health, his son Pablo spearheaded renovations. Pablo's renovations reflected the change in style in the Santa Barbara area, modifying the home to give it a Victorian appearance. The most significant changes in this time were the removal of the adobe columns in favor of wooden columns and the addition of wooden siding to the house.

The Casa is a Santa Barbara City Landmark, a California Historical Landmark. It is listed on the National Register of Historic Places together with Paseo de la Guerra as "El Paseo and Casa de la Guerra".

The house is being restored and furnished to appear as it might have between 1828 and 1858. The Casa de la Guerra interior is open to visitors Saturdays and Sundays, although the exterior may be explored any time.

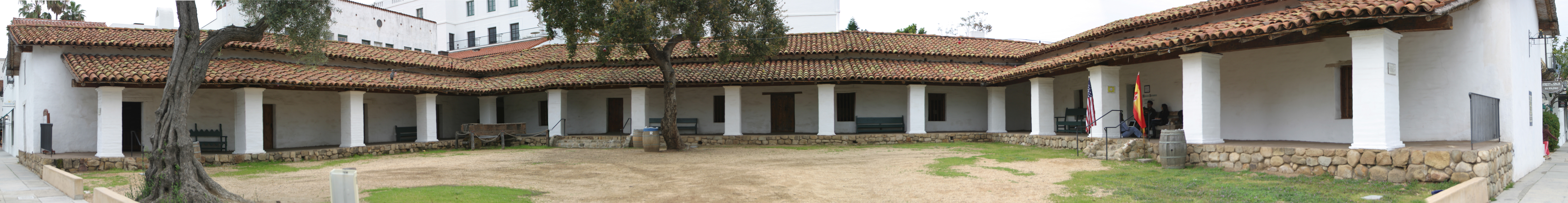
Casa de la Guerra

== See also ==
- Paseo de la Guerra
  - Pablo de la Guerra
  - Antonio Maria de la Guerra
  - Alfred Robinson - Anita de la Guerra de Noriega y Carrillo
- History of Santa Barbara, California
- California Historical Landmarks in Santa Barbara County, California
