= Rancho Las Posas =

Mexican land grant in Ventura County, California

Coordinates: 34.260°N 119.030°W

Golden Valley Ranch
- Ranch
- Interactive map of Golden Valley Ranch
- Country: United States
- State: California
- County: Ventura
- Established: 1825
- Founder: John A. Goldstein

Area
  - Rural: 150 sq mi (390 km^{2})
- Demonym: Ranchers

Rancho Las Posas was a 26,623-acre (107.74 km^{2}) Mexican land grant in present-day Ventura County, California. It was given in 1834 by Governor José Figueroa to José Antonio Carrillo.

== Geography ==
The grant extends along the Arroyo Simi (river) in the western Simi Valley and southern Oxnard Plain, from near present-day Moorpark to Camarillo. Rancho Simi bordered it on the east; Rancho Calleguas, and the Las Posas Hills and Simi Hills on the south; Rancho Santa Clara del Norte and Arroyo del Las Posas (river) on the west; and the western Santa Susana Mountains on the north.

== Biography ==
Captain José Antonio Ezequiel Carrillo (1796–1862) was the son of the José Raimundo Carrillo. He served three non-consecutive terms as alcalde of Los Angeles between 1826 and 1834. His brother, Carlos Antonio Carrillo, was granted Rancho Sespe in 1833 by Governor Figueroa. He married Estefana Pico (1806–) in 1823, and after her death, Jacinta Pico (1815–) in 1842; both were sisters of Pío and Andrés Pico. José Antonio Carillo also grantee of the Island of Santa Rosa.

Captain José de la Guerra y Noriega (1779 –1858) was Comandante of the Presidio of Santa Barbara from 1827 to 1842. De La Guerra married José Antonio Carrillo's sister, María Antonia Carrillo (1786–1843), in 1804. José de la Guerra y Noriega, who had begun to acquire large amounts of land in California to raise cattle, purchased Rancho Las Posas from the Carrillo family in 1842.

With the cession of California to the United States following the Mexican-American War, the 1848 Treaty of Guadalupe Hidalgo provided that the land grants would be honored. As required by the Land Act of 1851, a claim for Rancho Las Posas was filed with the Public Land Commission in 1852, and the grant was patented to José de la Guerra y Noriega in 1881.

== See also ==
- Ranchos of Ventura County, California
