= Urban Military Academy =

Defunct military school in California, USA

Coordinates: 34°04′02″N 118°28′04″W

Urban Military Academy was a boarding and day school in Hollywood, California, for boys between the ages of six and fifteen. It was founded in 1905 by Mary McDonnell on Melrose Avenue at Wilcox; it later moved to 11600 Sunset Boulevard. At the time it opened, it was "the only private school for boys in the City." Its commandant was Major Harry Lee Black, who in 1928 helped found Black-Foxe Military Institute on Urban's original site. There was another site located on the corner of Sunset Boulevard and a block east of Barrington Avenue in West Los Angeles. The Academy was active in the late 1950s.

Among its well-known students were John Coleman Burroughs, Jackie Coogan, John Meredyth Lucas, Dean Paul Martin, John T. Rickard, and Richard Sherman.
