= John T. Rickard =

American politician

John Treloar Rickard (December 27, 1913 - May 18, 2000) was a former Mayor of Santa Barbara, California.

== Early life ==
Rickard was born in Santa Barbara, California, in 1913 to James Bickle Rickard, US Postmaster, and Acacia Oreña Rickard, granddaughter of Jose De La Guerra y Noriega and Maria Antonio Carrillo. Rickard was the middle of two siblings. He had an older brother, James Robert Rickard and younger sister, Consuelo "Connie" Rickard.

Rickard lived in and attended school in Santa Barbara until the 1925 earthquake destroyed the family home on Victoria Street. On June 28, 1925, Rickard and his family moved to the family's ranch, the El Encinal, in Los Alamos, California. When school was ready to start in the fall, the family moved to Hancock Park in Los Angeles. While living in Los Angeles, Rickard and his brother, Robert, attended Urban Military Academy and Loyola High School; however, summers were always spent in Los Alamos on the Ranch. Rickard began his college career at Loyola University but after the completion of his sophomore year decided to transfer to the University of Santa Clara where he earned a bachelor's degree. Upon completion of college, Rickard decided to follow in his father's footsteps and become an attorney. He attended the University of California's law school, Boalt Hall, and earned his law degree and passed the bar in 1939. Rickard set up a law practice in Los Angeles and practiced there until he enlisted in the US Navy when the United States entered into World War II.

== Marriage and children ==
In 1943, while serving in the Navy, Rickard married Marion Esther Foster of Des Moines, Iowa in Miami, Florida. They would remain married until Marion's death in 1987. Rickard and Marion had five sons: James Bickle (1946), Robert Webb (1947), John Treloar Jr. (1948), Thomas Orena (1950), and Dennis Foster (1953-2015).

== World War II years ==
In 1942, Rickard enlisted in the United States Navy. He would serve in the South Pacific with the Navy until 1945 gaining the rank of Lieutenant Commander. Rickard was honorably discharged from the Navy in 1945. During his time in the Navy his brother Robert was killed in action while on duty on the USS Franklin in the South Pacific. Also during this time, Rickard's father, James Bickel Rickard, retired Santa Barbara Postmaster was stricken with appendicitis while at the family ranch and died before receiving the proper medical attention.

== "Old Spanish Days" and mayoral years ==
At the end of the War, Rickard returned to Santa Barbara to set up his practice as an attorney. Rickard was instrumental in revitalizing a local festival called "Old Spanish Days Fiesta", which had been placed on hold due to World War II and the subsequent droughts in Southern California. He would be El Presidente for "Old Spanish Days Fiesta" in 1948 and 1949. In the mid to late 1940s he would serve as City Harbor Commissioner and as City Attorney of Santa Barbara.

In 1953, he ran for and was elected Mayor of Santa Barbara. He would serve two terms as Mayor (1953-1954, 1955–1956). His terms as Mayor are largely considered to have been very successful. During his mayoral terms the following was accomplished:

- "Voluntary Annexations" for City services helped Santa Barbara's City limits expanded to include Coast Village Road to the East and Highway 154 (Five Points) to the West.
- City Hall would also approve bonds to acquire the land for Shoreline Park.
- City Hall would secure Real Estate that would later become Mackenzie Park and the Municipal Golf Course.
- A sign ordinance would be adopted that limited the size and height of signage in Santa Barbara.
- A new police station and fire station were built. Both remain in use today.
- City trash and paving contracts were put out to bid. The cost savings helped fund sidewalks and street paving on the lower Eastside.
- Boat slips were built in the harbor for the 1st time.
- Trash burning in the backyard was banned and trash collection was regulated, as not to allow trash to be picked up curbside.

However, the most important accomplishment by City Hall during that time may have been the no drilling sanctuary that was enacted on August 27, 1954. The sanctuary spanned from Summerland (Sheffield Drive) to UCSB (16 miles long). This gave the City of Santa Barbara jurisdiction from its shoreline to the three-mile limit where federal control begins. Rickard felt the sanctuary was needed to "protect beautiful beach recreational and residential areas from desecration by oil well development...".

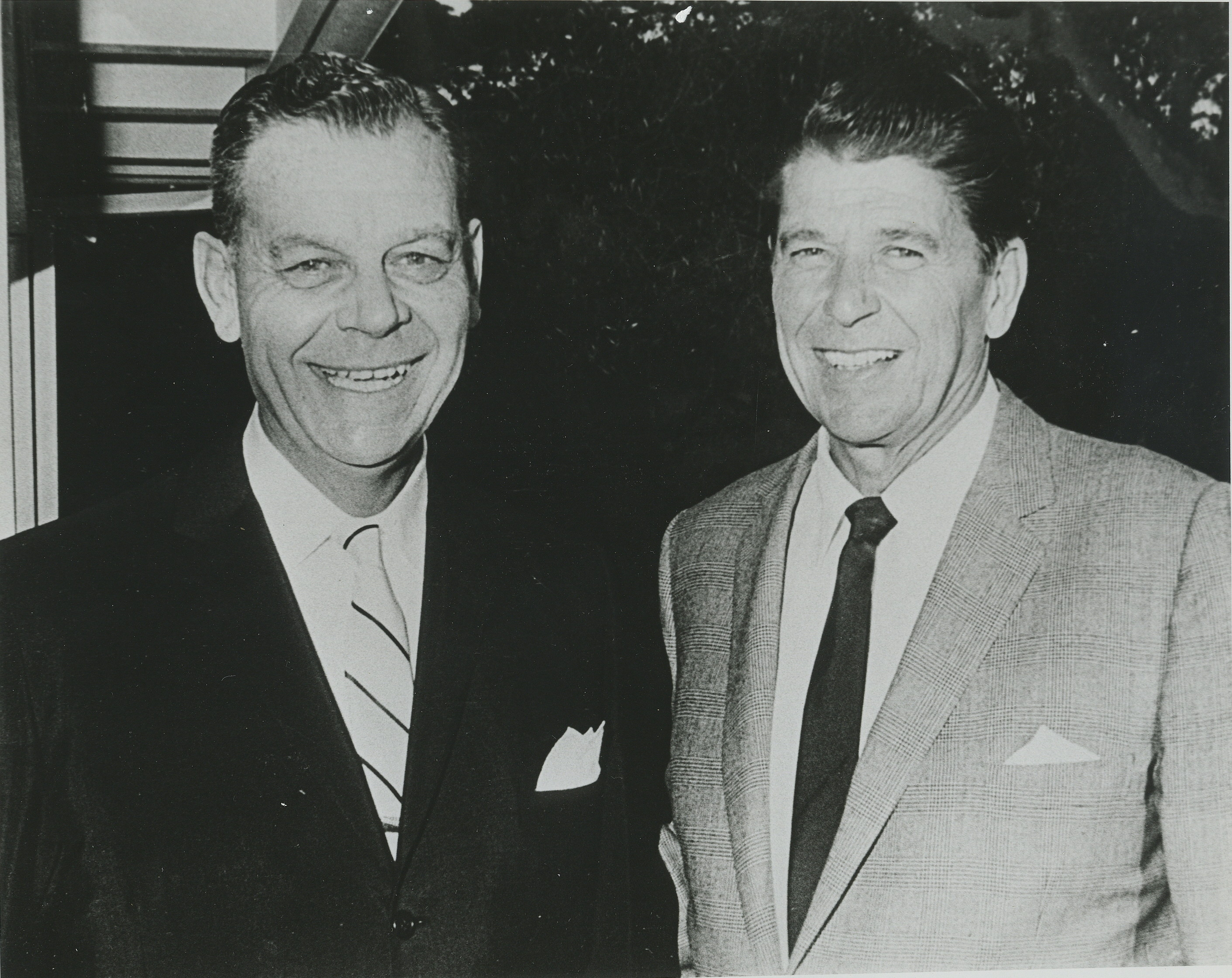
Rickard & Reagan

Rickard chose not to run for a third term as Mayor and would return to his career as a lawyer. He would remain politically involved in Santa Barbara. During this time he worked intimately with the likes of city matriarch Pearl Chase and former Santa Barbara News-Press owner T.M. Storke to promote the creation of "smokeless" industry based on the research and development potential offered by UCSB. He believed that essential to that vision was a full service commercial airport capable of handling the new generation of large jet planes. It was he who figured out that by extending city jurisdiction to include a 50-foot-wide ribbon of land underneath the ocean that ran up the coast to the airport, Santa Barbara could claim the airport as "contiguous" property, essential to the annexation process. The shoestring annexation would allow the City of Santa Barbara to make improvements, upgrades, and operations expansions required to meet federal requirements to retain commercial carriers vital to Santa Barbara's economic vitality. On November 14, 1961 the airport land was annexed by the City of Santa Barbara.

In 1968, after spending the majority of his professional career as a lawyer, he was appointed a Superior Court Judge by the Governor of California, Ronald Reagan. The following year (1969) he was honored as Santa Barbara's "Man of the Year". Rickard would serve for 14 impeccable years on the bench before retiring in 1982. In his honor, the County Bar presents an annual award, the John T. Rickard Judicial Service Award, to an individual who has made outstanding contributions to the judiciary and/or the local court system.

== Legacy ==
On October 30, 2012 the Santa Barbara City Council voted 5–2 to name the new $63 million airport terminal, the John T. Rickard Terminal.
