= People v. de la Guerra =

People v. de la Guerra, 40 Cal. 311 (1870), was a landmark case in the California Supreme Court that upheld the right of Mexicans in California to run for public office on the grounds that the Treaty of Guadalupe Hidalgo granted United States citizenship to all Mexicans residing in California should they want it. The case centered on Californian native Pablo de la Guerra who was elected to a judicial position in California, who had accepted United States citizenship. The court ruled in favor of de la Guerra, upholding his right to hold public office as a naturalized American citizen.

== Background ==
=== Historical background ===
After the Mexican-American War (1846-1848), the United States gained control of a vast portion of northern Mexican territory through the Treaty of Guadalupe Hidalgo (1848). This included present day California, New Mexico, Arizona, Nevada, Colorado and Utah. With the redrawing of the U.S.-Mexico border, many Mexicans who had been living in these territories for generations found themselves residing within the United States. The treaty promised to safeguard their rights, particularly in matters of citizenship, property ownership, and cultural practices. However, these promises were often ignored or poorly enforced. For example, many Mexican landowners were stripped of their property through legal loopholes, expensive court battles, and outright fraud, contributing to the widespread disenfranchisement of the Californio, Mexican nationals living in California prior to its annexation, population.

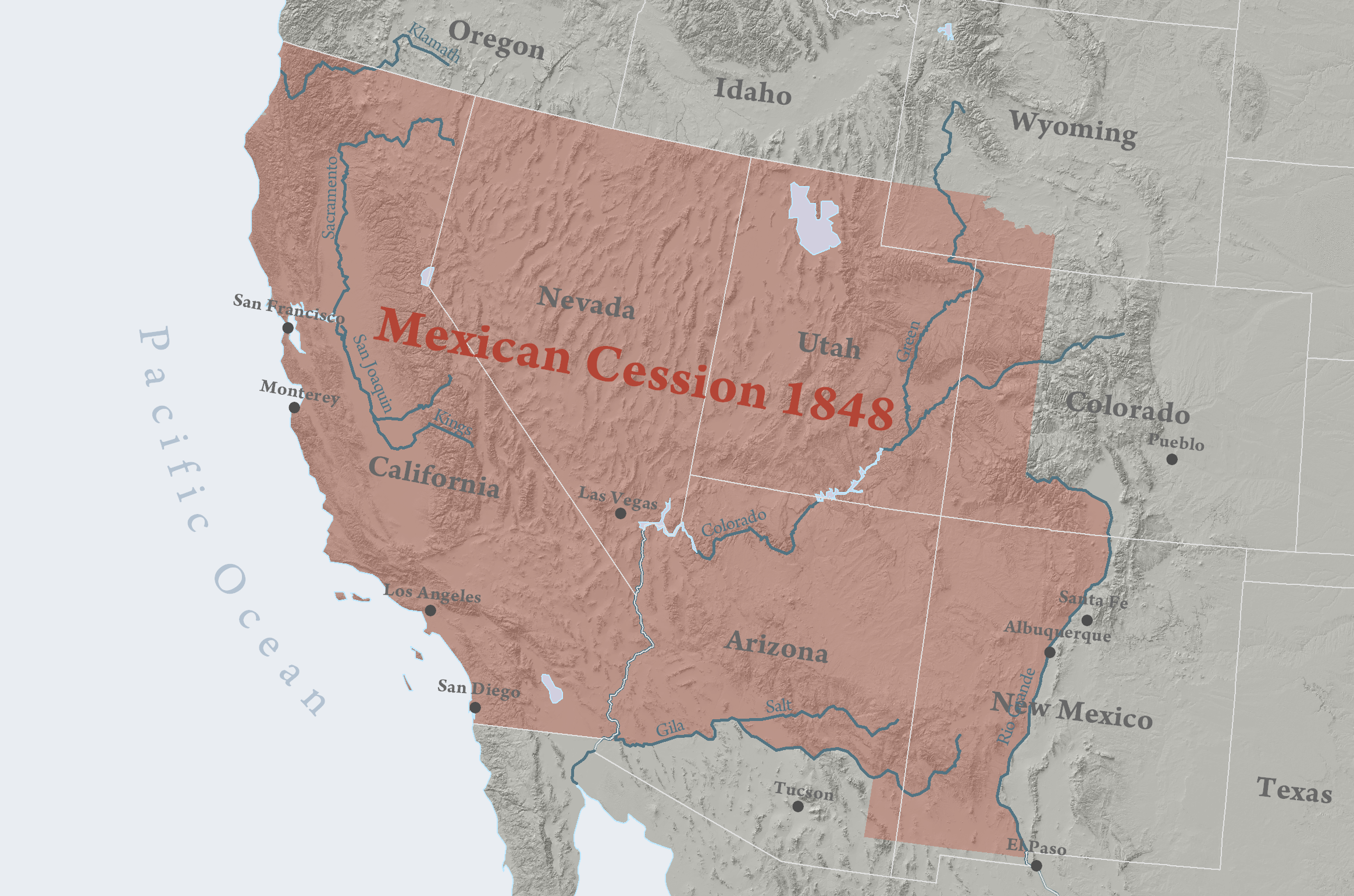

=== Social context ===
Following the war, tensions escalated between the Mexican residents and the influx of Anglo-American settlers moving westward. These newcomers often viewed the native Mexican population with prejudice, treating them as inferior and questioning their rights to land and political participation. Social and racial animosity was exacerbated by economic competition and cultural differences, leading to systemic efforts to marginalize Mexican residents in their own homeland. This environment set the stage for legal challenges like the one faced by Pablo de la Guerra.

=== Parties involved ===
Pablo de la Guerra, a distinguished figure in Santa Barbara, came from the influential de la Guerra family, known for their prominence in Californio society. Fluent in Spanish and English, he served as a delegate to California's Constitutional Convention, a state senator, and even acting lieutenant governor. Despite his qualifications and contributions, de la Guerra's political ascent faced resistance rooted in anti-Mexican sentiment.

The case against him was filed by M.M. Kimberly, a relatively obscure figure about whom little historical information is available. Kimberly argued that de la Guerra was ineligible to hold public office, claiming he had never been properly naturalized as a U.S. citizen and thus retained his Mexican citizenship. This case reflected broader efforts to exclude Californios from positions of power and influence in the rapidly changing social and political landscape of post-war California.

== Legal proceedings ==
The legal proceedings in People v. de la Guerra centered on Pablo de la Guerra's eligibility to serve as a judge in California. The case arose after his opponents claimed he was ineligible because, as a former Mexican citizen, he supposedly had not been granted U.S. citizenship. This argument stemmed from tensions over the integration of Californios, Mexican nationals living in California prior to its annexation, into U.S. society.

De la Guerra, a prominent Californio and political figure, had been elected to the judiciary. His opponents challenged his election by arguing that the Treaty of Guadalupe Hidalgo did not automatically confer citizenship to Californios. The California Supreme Court ultimately ruled in his favor, confirming that under the treaty and California's admission to the Union, former Mexican citizens who remained in California were granted U.S. citizenship and the rights associated with it. The decision upheld de la Guerra's position as judge and reinforced the citizenship status of Californios as part of California's integration into the United States.

The case highlighted significant racial and political tensions in post-annexation California, particularly as Anglo-American settlers sought to dominate the state's legal and political systems at the expense of the native Californio population. The ruling was a key moment in asserting the rights of Californios under U.S. law, even amid widespread discrimination.

== Impact ==
The case of People v. de la Guerra had several significant impacts, both legally and socially, particularly in the context of post-Mexican-American War California. The California Supreme Court reaffirmed that under the Treaty of Guadalupe Hidalgo, Mexican nationals residing in California at the time of annexation automatically became U.S. citizens. This was a crucial legal precedent that protected the rights of Californios against discriminatory claims questioning their eligibility for public office. The ruling validated the political and civic participation of Californios, including their eligibility for government positions. This was an important acknowledgment of their place in California's political landscape, despite significant racial prejudice and efforts to marginalize them. The case reinforced the binding nature of international treaties like the Treaty of Guadalupe Hidalgo in domestic legal disputes. This strengthened protections for the rights of minority groups based on treaty provisions.

Although the ruling was a victory for de la Guerra and other Californios, it did not eliminate the systemic discrimination they faced. The case highlighted tensions between Anglo-Americans and Californios, particularly over land ownership, cultural differences, and political influence. The decision reflected the broader struggle of Californios to maintain their rights and identity in the face of Anglo-American expansion. It became a symbolic assertion of Californio resilience during a period when many were losing land and political power due to discriminatory policies and practices.
