= Rancho El Conejo =

Mexican land grant in Ventura and Los Angeles Counties, California

Coordinates: 34°12′0″N 118°54′0″W

Rancho El Conejo was a 48,572-acre (196.56 km^{2}) Spanish land grant in California given in 1803 to Jose Polanco and Ygnacio Rodriguez that encompassed the area now known as the Conejo Valley in southeastern Ventura and northwestern Los Angeles Counties. El Conejo is Spanish for "The Rabbit", and refers to the many rabbits common to the region (the desert cottontail and brush rabbit species). The east-west grant boundaries approximately went from the border of Westlake Village near Lindero Canyon Road in the east to the Conejo Grade (the top of the hill along the 101 Freeway looking down into Camarillo) in the west. The north-south borders extended from the top of the Simi Hills at the end of Moorpark Road in the north to Hidden Valley in the Santa Monica Mountains in the south. The rancho is the site of the communities of Newbury Park, Thousand Oaks, and Westlake Village.

== History ==
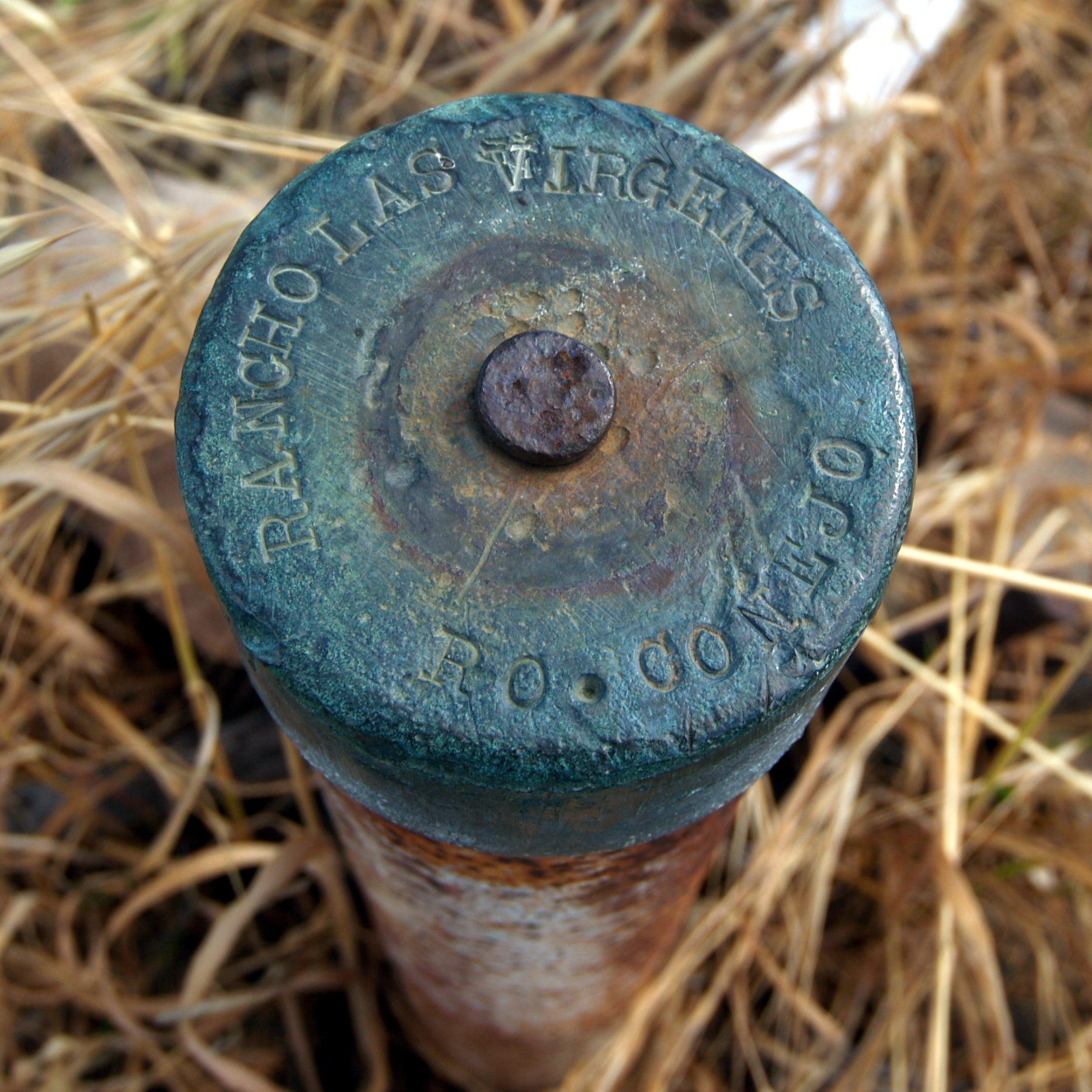
Rancho Las Virgenes and Rancho El Conejo boundary marker.

Former Santa Barbara Presidio soldiers Jose Polanco and Ygnacio Rodriquez were granted Rancho El Conejo in 1803. Polanco, eventually lost his land due to neglect. In 1822, influential Santa Barbara army officer José de la Guerra y Noriega was granted Polanco's claim by Spanish Governor Pablo Vicente de Solá.

With the cession of California to the United States following the Mexican-American War, the 1848 Treaty of Guadalupe Hidalgo provided that the land grants would be honored. As required by the Land Act of 1851, a claim for Rancho El Conejo was filed with the Public Land Commission in 1852, and the grant was patented to José de la Guerra y Noriega and María del Carmen de Rodríguez in 1873.

The property stayed in the de la Guerra and Rodriguez families until the 1860s, when after drought and disease decimated local cattle, the two families began selling off their land. In 1872, H. W. Mills purchased one-half of the Conejo grant from the heirs of Captain Jose de la Guerra, which he called the Triunfo Ranch. Mills went bankrupt and Andrew D. Russell purchased his Triunfo Ranch in 1881. In 1882, 2,200 acres (9 km^{2}) of the Newbury tract were sold. In 1910, Harold and Edwin Janss of the Janss Investment Company purchased about 10,000 acres (40 km^{2}) of land of what is now Thousand Oaks from the heir of John Edwards, who had purchased the land from the de la Guerra heirs.

== Historic sites of the Rancho ==
- De la Guerra built an adobe in Westlake that was later submerged by the Westlake dam.
- De la Guerra Adobe Ruins (1860) are located at 4651 Tapo Canyon Road.

== See also ==
- Ranchos of California
- List of Ranchos of California
