= Black-Foxe Military Institute =

Private military school in Hollywood, California, U.S.

Coordinates: 34°04′57″N 118°19′55″W

The Black-Foxe Military Institute was a private military school for boys in the Hollywood neighborhood of Los Angeles, California. It was located adjacent to the Wilshire Country Club to the west and south and the Los Angeles Tennis Club to the east.

Black-Foxe was founded in 1928 by Charles E. Toberman, a Hollywood developer and financier, along with two World War I veterans, Army Majors Earle Foxe and Harry Lee Black. The new school took over the site of the former Urban Military Academy, where Black had been commandant. Foxe became president, Black commandant of cadets, and Major Harry Gaver as headmaster. Black-Foxe attracted the sons of people in the film industry, thanks to its location and Foxe's Hollywood connections. Gaver died in 1954.

In 1959, Toberman sold Black-Foxe to Raymond Rosendahl. Foxe retired as president the next year. In the early 1960s, Rosendahl changed its name to the Black-Foxe School. Rosendahl sold the school in 1965 to a nonprofit group. In 1968, the school's mortgage holder foreclosed on the campus and Black-Foxe closed permanently.

== Notable alumni ==
- Jack Banta, halfback in the National Football League (NFL) for the Philadelphia Eagles, the Washington Redskins and Los Angeles Rams.
- Harry Carey Jr., actor.
- Charles Chaplin, Jr., actor, son of Charlie Chaplin.
- Guillermo Endara, president of Panama from 1989 to 1994.
- Larry Hagman, actor who played JR Ewing on the TV show Dallas.
- Alan Hale Jr., actor who played The Skipper on the TV show Gilligan's Island.
- Gary Lewis, musician, leader of Gary Lewis & the Playboys, son of comedian Jerry Lewis, attended from 1951 through 1963.
- Brown Meggs, record executive, novelist; signed the Beatles to Capitol Records in 1963.
- Bobby Robertson, football player
- Robert Wagner, television and film actor.
- Gene Wilder, film actor who appeared in Young Frankenstein and The Producers. Wilder attended Black-Foxe for one year. He wrote that he was bullied and sexually assaulted there, primarily because he was the only Jewish boy in the school.
