= Felipe de Goicoechea =

Don Felipe de Goicoechea
- Born: Felipe Antonio de Goicoechea; 1747; Cosalá, New Navarre, New Spain
- Died: 1814 (aged 66–67); Loreto, Baja California Sur

Don Felipe Antonio de Goicoechea was born in 1747 in Cosalá, New Navarre, New Spain. He joined the Spanish military at age 35 as a cadet. In June 1782, was promoted to alférez. In 1783 while serving in the presidial company of Buenavista (Lower California), Don Felipe was commissioned as lieutenant and received orders to proceed to Alta California to take command of the Presidio of Santa Barbara. He assumed command in Santa Bárbara on January 25, 1784, taking over from José Francisco Ortega. He supervised construction of the fortifications and living quarters for the soldiers and their families and remained in command until 1802. The Presidio was built based on designs he drew up in 1788.

In 1805 he was appointed governor of the province of Baja California, but did not assume office until 1806. He held that position until his death in 1814 at Loreto, Baja California Sur.
