= List of mayors of Santa Barbara, California =

Mayor of Santa Barbara
- Flag of Santa Barbara
- Incumbent; Randy Rouse since January 11, 2022
- Term length: 4 years
- Formation: 1850
- First holder: Lewis T. Burton

Since the city's incorporation in April 1850, the city of Santa Barbara, California has had over 50 mayors.

== List of mayors ==
| Name | Term | Description | Notes | Ref |
|---|---|---|---|---|
| 1 | Lewis T. Burton | 8/26/1850-11/21/1850 | Burton was born in 1809 in Tennessee and moved to California in 1831. He was a storekeeper and owned the Rancho Jesús María and a portion of the Rancho Bolsa de Chamisal. He was elected to the Common Council and was selected as its first president and acting mayor. The minutes of the Common Council first meeting recorded Burton's election: "In the City of Santa Barbara, on the 26 of August, 1850, the persons elected to the Common Council assembled and proceeded to elect a president. Lewis T. Burton having received a majority of the votes was declared elected. Luis Carrillo was then elected Clerk. The Council then adjourned." Burton died in 1879 and was buried in the Santa Barbara Cemetery. | |
| 2 | Francisco de la Guerra | 1850-51, 1852–54, 1866–70 | Born in Santa Barbara in 1817, the son of José de la Guerra y Noriega. Elected as mayor three times, on 11/15/1850, on 2/28/1852 for a two-year term, and on 3/7/1866 for a four-year term; first person to officially hold the title of "mayor". Died in 1878 and was buried in the Mission Santa Barbara Cemetery. | |
| 3 | Joaquín Carrillo | 1851-1852 | Grandson of José Raimundo Carrillo, he was born in 1813. Elected as mayor on 5/6/51. He was also Santa Barbara's first county judge, then judge of the Second Judicial District, and a member of the committee that named Santa Barbara's streets. | |
| 4 | Isaac J. Sparks | 1853 | Born 1804 in Maine. Moved to Santa Barbara where he became an otter trapper and acquired Rancho Huasna and Rancho Pismo. Elected as mayor on 5/5/1853. Died 1867. | |
| 5 | Jose M. Covarrubias | 1853-1854 | Born c. 1809. Elected as mayor on 11/6/1853. He was also a delegate to California Constitutional Convention in 1849 and represented Santa Barbara in the California State Assembly from 1849 to 1862. Died 1870. His home the Covarrubia Adobe (715 N Santa Barbara St.) is a California Historic Landmark. | |
| 6 | Joaquin de la Guerra | 1854-1855 | Elected as mayor on 5/8/1854 | |
| 7 | Pablo de la Guerra | 1855 | Elected as mayor on 5/8/1855; resigned from office on 6/18/1855 for health reasons | |
| 8 | Jose Carrillo | 1855 | Elected on 7/24/1855 to replace mayor Pablo de la Guerra | |
| 9 | H. B. Blake | 1856 | Elected as mayor on 3/24/1856 | |
| 10 | Antonio Maria de la Guerra | 1856-1858, 1859-1864 | Elected as mayor on 5/6/1856 for two-year term; elected again in 1859 and 1860 for one-year terms and again in 1862 for a two-year term | |
| 11 | Guillermo Carrillo | 1858-1859 | Elected as mayor on 5/15/1858 | |
| 12 | Mortimer Cook | 1874-1875, 1876-1878 | Born 1826 in Mansfield, Ohio. Elected as mayor on 3/2/1874 for a one-year term and in 1876 for a two-year term. Later settled along the Skagit River in Washington. Died in 1899. | |
| 13 | Jarrett T. Richards | 1875-1876 | Elected as mayor on 4/8/1875 | |
| 14 | R. L. Chamberlain | 1878-1880 | Elected as mayor on 4/4/78 | |
| 15 | Peter J. Barber | 1880-1882, 1890-1892 | Elected as mayor on 4/15/1880 | |
| 16 | Charles Fernald | 1882-1884 | Elected as mayor on 4/6/1882 | |
| 17 | G. W. Coffin | 1884-1888 | Elected as mayor on 4/7/1884 | |
| 18 | John P. Stearns | 1888-1890 | Born 1828. Builder of Stearns Wharf; elected as mayor on 4/2/1888. Died 1902. | |
| 19 | Edward W. Gaty | 1892-1894 | Elected as mayor on 4/4/1892 | |
| 20 | John M. Holloway | 1894-1896 | Elected as mayor on 4/2/1894 | |
| 21 | Frank M. Whitney | 1896-1898 | Elected as mayor on 4/6/1896 | |
| 22 | Charles A. Storke | 1900-1902 | Previously the Santa Barbara District Attorney | |
| 23 | George S. Edwards | 1901-1905 | Elected as mayor on 12/3/1901; reelected in 1903. | |
| 24 | Thomas D. Wood | Jan. 1906 | Served as mayor for 16 days; resigned because he did not want to attend city council meetings at night | |
| 25 | Elmer J. Boeske | 1907-1909, 1911-1914 | Elected as mayor on 12/31/1907. Dentist and organizer of the Santa Barbara Motion Picture Company. | |
| 26 | Clio Lloyd | 1909-1911 | Elected as mayor on 12/7/1909 | |
| 27 | Frank Smith | 1915-1917 | Elected as mayor on 12/7/1915 | |
| 28 | Willis M. Slosson | 1917-1918 | Elected as mayor on 5/3/1917 | |
| 29 | Harvey T. Nielsen | 1918-1921 | | |
| 30 | J. E. Sloan | 1921- | | |
| 31 | Charles M. Andera | 1925-1926 | | |
| 32 | H. A. Adrian | 1926-1927 | | |
| 33 | T. R. Finley | 1927-1931 | | |
| 34 | Harvey Nileson | 1931-1935 | | |
| 35 | Edmond O. Hanson | 1935-1936 | Resigned in December 1936 despite prevailing in an election for his recall | |
| 36 | Patrick Joseph Maher | 1936-1945 | Born in Ireland. Died in 1985 at age 101. | |
| 37 | Herbert E. Weyler | 1945-1947 | | |
| 38 | Norris Montgomery | 1947-1953 | Died in 1966. | |
| 39 | John T. Rickard | 1953-1957 | | |
| 40 | Floyd O. Bohnett | 1957-1959 | Died in 2017 at age 93. | |
| 41 | Edward L. Abbott | 1959-1963 | | |
| 42 | W. Don MacGillivray | 1963-1968 | Resigned in 1968 after being elected to the California Assembly | |
| 43 | Gerald Firestone | 1969-1973 | | |
| 44 | David Shiffman | 1973-1981 | | |
| 45 | Sheila Lodge | 1981-1993 | She was the first woman to serve as mayor of Santa Barbara and also held the position for longer (12 years) than any other person in the city's history. | |
| 46 | Hal Conklin | 1993-1994 | Served on City Council 1977–1993. He was sworn in as mayor in 1993 but was forced to step down after a year when a court ruled that he was prohibited from serving by a law limiting city council members to four consecutive terms. Died in 2021 in Santa Barbara. | |
| 47 | Harriet Miller | 1995-2001 | Born in 1919 in Idaho. Died 2010. | |
| 48 | Marty Blum | 2001-2009 | Blum was born in Illinois and attended Purdue University, later receiving a JD at Loyola University. She moved to Santa Barbara in 1968 with her husband Joe, a physician. Prior to her political career, she practiced law on the South Coast. Blum was elected to the Santa Barbara City Council in November 1995 and won re-election in 1999. Blum was elected mayor in November 2001, and re-elected in November 2005. | |
| 49 | Helene Schneider | 2010-2018 | Born in 1970 in New York City. Served 14 years on City Council and 8 years as mayor. | |
| 50 | Cathy Murillo | 2018-2022 | The first Latina to serve as mayor. First mayor of Santa Barbara to serve less than four years since Hal Conklin in 1994. | |
| 51 | Randy Rowse | 2022–present | See official Santa Barbara Mayoral website. | |

== See also ==
- List of mayors of Oxnard, California
- List of mayors of Ventura, California
