= Old Spanish Days Fiesta =

Annual festival in Santa Barbara, California

- Santa Barbara Mayor Marty Blum and Husband in the 2008 Fiesta Parade
- Status: Active
- Genre: Heritage festival, parades, dance, rodeo
- Frequency: Annual, first week of August
- Location: Santa Barbara, California
- Years active: 1924–present
- Founded: 1924
- Organizer: Old Spanish Days, Inc.
- Website: www.sbfiesta.org

Old Spanish Days Fiesta, commonly called Fiesta, is an annual five-day festival in Santa Barbara, California, held in late July or early August. It celebrates the city's Spanish, Mexican and Californio heritage with parades, dance performances, open-air markets and a rodeo. The first Fiesta was held in August 1924 to mark the reopening of the rebuilt Lobero Theatre. Except for World War II, it has been held every year since, even managing to hold a highly modified event during the height of the 2020 COVID-19 epidemic. The Library of Congress recorded the festival as a "Local Legacy", describing it as a celebration of Santa Barbara's rancho period of about 1830 to 1865. Its main events include La Fiesta Pequeña on the steps of Mission Santa Barbara, El Desfile Histórico (the Historical Parade), which is among the largest equestrian parades in the United States and the Fiesta Stock Horse Show & Rodeo, held at the Earl Warren Showgrounds from 1958 to 2024.

== History ==
=== Origins (1924) ===
In June 1924 a committee formed to organize a summer festival that would combine community arts, Santa Barbara's Spanish traditions and a carnival spirit. The Community Arts Association had scheduled the opening of the reconstructed Lobero Theatre for August 1924 and the festival was planned around it. Civic leaders Bernhard and Irene Hoffmann and preservationist Pearl Chase were among its organizers. Photographs of the early festivals from 1924 to 1930, collected by Chase, are held by the Santa Barbara Trust for Historic Preservation.

=== Mid-20th century ===
No Fiesta was held from 1942 to 1945 because of World War II. It resumed in 1946. One account says the festival was also cancelled because of the drought of 1948. In 1958 the Fiesta Stock Horse Show & Rodeo moved to the new Earl Warren Showgrounds, which hosted it for the next 67 years.

=== COVID-19 pandemic ===
In 2020 Old Spanish Days cancelled its events that drew large crowds, including both parades, and moved most of the festival online and onto local television. A planned drive-by "Caravan Parade" was also called off after city and county officials warned it could draw crowds. The 2021 festival, held August 4–8, lost almost all of its major events to a surge in COVID-19 cases. These included the parades, the Mercados and the Noches de Ronda performances at the Santa Barbara County Courthouse. In both years the Santa Barbara Historical Museum's Project Fiesta exhibit of posters, costumes and memorabilia stayed open.

=== Parade route change ===
For nearly a century the Historical Parade ran along State Street. In 2022 it moved to Cabrillo Boulevard along the waterfront, because the downtown blocks of State Street had been closed to cars and turned into a pedestrian promenade with outdoor dining. In 2024 the city reported that no active parades were permitted on State Street, pending the outcome of the State Street Master Plan.

=== Centennial (2024) ===
The 100th Fiesta, held July 31 to August 4, 2024, had the theme "Viva el Centenario" ("Long Live the Centennial"). The 2024 festival had no carnival and fewer charros (horsemen) in the parade than in earlier years.

=== Rodeo dispute ===
After the 2024 festival, Old Spanish Days and the Earl Warren Showgrounds failed to agree on a new contract for the rodeo. Financial records showed the fees Old Spanish Days paid to use the grounds had risen by more than 120 percent between 2017 and 2024. In 2025 the Old Spanish Days board voted unanimously to separate from the showgrounds, ending a 67-year relationship. The official Fiesta stock horse show moved to the Santa Ynez Valley. The showgrounds held its own rodeo, not affiliated with Old Spanish Days, during Fiesta weekend.

== Events ==
Old Spanish Days consist of multiple events spread out across the city. Starting each spring Old Spanish Days holds auditions to choose a "Spirit of Fiesta" and a "Junior Spirit of Fiesta", young dancers who serve as the festival's ambassadors. Dancers aged 16 to 20 can compete for Spirit of Fiesta and children aged 8 to 10 for Junior Spirit. The Spirit leads the Historical Parade, while the Junior Spirit rides in a horse-drawn carriage with the mayor of Santa Barbara. Since the mid-1990s both have danced together on the Mission steps at La Fiesta Pequeña.

Event	Description
La Fiesta Pequeña ("Little Fiesta")	The official opening night, a free evening of Spanish classical, Mexican folklórico and flamenco dance on the steps of Mission Santa Barbara. Crowds crack cascarones, confetti-filled eggshells sold throughout the festival.
El Desfile Histórico ("the Historical Parade")	A Friday afternoon parade of more than 600 horses, along with carriages, riders and dancers, described as one of the largest equestrian parades in the country.
El Desfile de los Niños ("the Children's Parade")	A secondary parade led by the Junior Spirit of Fiesta.
Mercados ("Markets")	Open-air markets with food, crafts and music, held at De la Guerra Plaza and other downtown sites.
Noches de Ronda ("Nights of Serenade")	Evening performances in the Sunken Gardens of the Santa Barbara County Courthouse.
Fiesta Stock Horse Show & Rodeo	Held at the Earl Warren Showgrounds from 1958 to 2024, and in the Santa Ynez Valley since 2025.

== Criticism ==
Historians and commentators have criticized the festival for presenting a romanticized story of Spanish colonial life that leaves out the region's Chumash people and much of its Mexican and Mexican-American history. In 2022 Chumash filmmaker Spenser Jaimes called the opening events on the Mission steps a "celebration of colonization". The Santa Ynez Band of Chumash Indians, a Fiesta sponsor, said that some Chumash families take part while others choose not to. In 2023 an elder of the Barbareño Chumash community served as the parade's grand marshal, the first time a Chumash elder had done so.

== See also ==
- Earl Warren Showgrounds
- Lobero Theatre
- Mission Santa Barbara
- Santa Barbara Summer Solstice Parade
