= Rancho Los Álamos =

Mexican land grant in California

Coordinates: 34.760°N 120.260°W

Rancho Los Álamos was a 48,803-acre (197.50 km^{2}) Mexican land grant in present-day Santa Barbara County, California given in 1839 by Governor Juan Alvarado to José Antonio de la Guerra, a son of José de la Guerra y Noriega. Los Álamos is Spanish for "the cottonwoods" and describes Frémont's Cottonwood (Populus fremontii) trees lining the banks of the San Antonio Creek.

== History ==
In 1839, during Mexico's rule of Alta California, José Antonio de la Guerra was granted title to Rancho Los Álamos in the Los Alamos Valley. Concepción Ortega, who married José de la Guerra, came to live at the adobe ranch house.

With the cession of California to the United States following the Mexican–American War, the 1848 Treaty of Guadalupe Hidalgo provided that the land grants would be honored. As required by the Land Act of 1851, a claim for Rancho Los Álamos was filed with the Public Land Commission in 1852, and the land grant was patented to de la Guerra in 1872.

In 1876, San Francisco financier Thomas Bell along with his son John S. Bell, and James B. Shaw, purchased acreage from Rancho Los Álamos and the neighboring Rancho La Laguna. Both families allocated a half square mile from each of their new ranches to create the Los Alamos town site with "Centennial Street" as the central thoroughfare.

== Historic sites of the Rancho ==
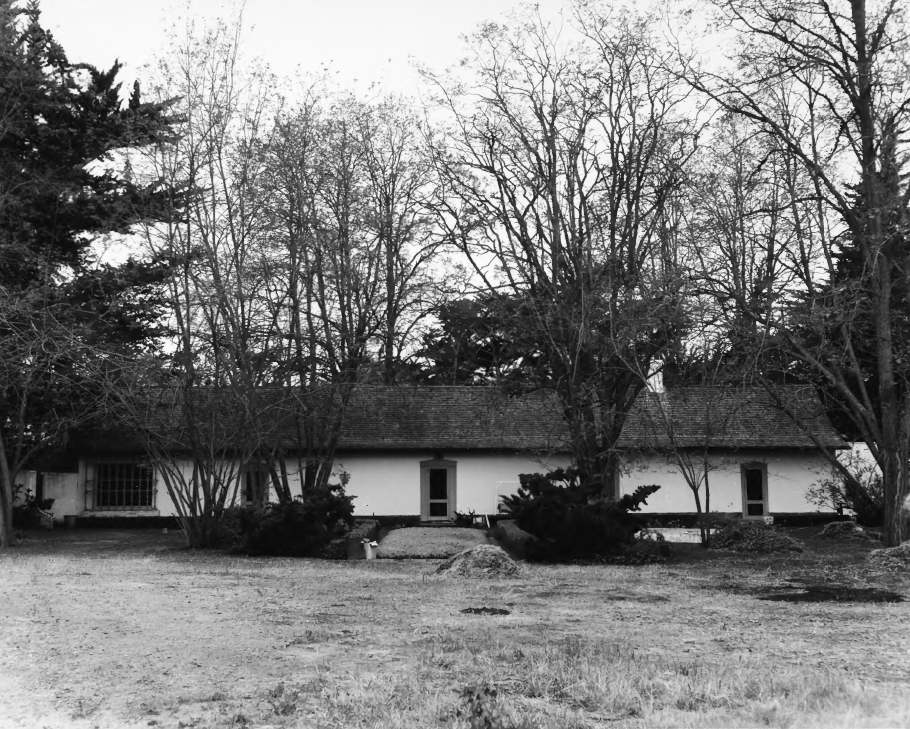
Los Alamos Ranch House in 1968

- Los Alamos Ranch House. A one story adobe ranch house established about 1840 and designated a National Historic Landmark in 1970.

== See also ==
- Ranchos of California
- List of Ranchos of California
