= Women's property rights =

Women's property rights are property and inheritance rights enjoyed by women as a category within a society.

Property rights are claims to property that are legally and socially recognized and enforceable by external legitimized authority. Broadly defined, land rights can be understood as a variety of legitimate claims to land and the benefits and products produced on that land. Inheritance, transfers from the State, tenancy arrangements, and land purchase are all constructs of land rights. These rights can be in the form of actual ownership or usufruct, the rights of use.

== Global overview ==
Women play an integral part in the production of food and goods, from work in fields and factories to home-based businesses across the globe. There is a critical relationship between the role that women play and the sustenance provided for families, communities, and nations. Globally, an estimated 41% of women- headed households live below the locally defined poverty line, and one-third of the world's women are either homeless or living in inadequate housing. The additional exclusion of women from access to land pushes them towards cities, where they often join the increasing number of women-headed households in slum areas. However, through the processes of globalization and industrialization, there has been a noted increase in the number of women entering the waged labor sectors. Rural women are solely responsible for half of the world's food production, and in developing countries, as much as 80% of food crops. More recent estimates claim that half of the world's food and, in developing countries, between 60-80% of food crops are grown from seeds planted by women. The persistence of traditional divisions of labor, in which women hold primary responsibility for producing food as well as other labor-intensive tasks such as gathering water and fuel, contributes to the large percentage of women working informally in rural areas. The roles that women play differ significantly by region; women make up an average of 43% of the agricultural labor force in developing countries, ranging from 20% in Latin America to 50% in Eastern Asia and sub-Saharan Africa. Thus, in addition to increasing vulnerability and reducing status, the exclusion of women from decision- making and from the control and transfer of land has also led to a decrease in food security and sustainable development.

== Shifting systems ==
Though women's lack of formal control over land and resources has long-standing historical roots, economies and societies undergoing extensive change have had deep implications for ownership rights. In subsistence production systems, access to land was determined by status within the family rather than by actual ownership rights, resulting in both men and women having “user rights” to produce food for their families. The combined processes of industrialization and globalization have disrupted longstanding livelihoods and systems of production, forcing many families to focus more on income-generating activities than on subsistence practices. However, increasing women's access to property rights has numerous significant economic benefits for the overall community, as well as psychological and social benefits for women themselves, especially in agricultural societies. Following 20th-century mandates on property laws intended to promote greater gender equality, governments began to expand women's access to land ownership in rural areas. Economically, when women have greater access to land ownership, they begin to cultivate their own land independently (whether given to them by the state, allocated through the private market, or passed on by a male relative), form women's collectives to learn more about agricultural practices and profit-generating skills, and ultimately yield more output from that land than the previous owners. A further, psychological benefit of increasing women's access to property rights is a significant decrease in instances of marital domestic violence. These factors can contribute to the long-term economic growth of the community through higher overall labor force participation rates, increased income generation, and greater investment in child healthcare and education, thereby also combating malnutrition and helping to break the poverty cycle.

== Impact of gender bias ==
The typical process of agrarian transformation, under which labor shifts from agricultural to nonagricultural sectors, has occurred slowly and with heavy gender bias. Because women's property rights are often assumed to be secured through the household head, who is often male, some inheritance laws allocate less property to female heirs than to male heirs. Ongoing adherence to male-dominated traditions of property ownership has generally meant that women cannot take advantage of the wide range of benefits associated with ownership and control of property. According to the Land Tenure Service at FAO, poverty is inversely correlated with household land ownership, and direct access to land minimizes women's risk of impoverishment and improves the physical well-being and prospects of children.

=== Land titles ===
The process of titling has been administered with strong gender bias, with women usually denied equal ownership rights. Furthermore, property and inheritance claims are generally processed through loosely organized administrative bodies consisting of local leaders and clerks with limited legal training, most of whom are men.

== Patriarchal property rights ==
Women who are potentially able to meet their subsistence needs on their own may threaten to leave the household if they are not given a large share of the surplus. However, because patriarchal property rights give husbands control over the allocation of their wives’ labor time, husbands can make decisions that reduce the value of their wives’ alternatives to marriage. Secure land rights, which encompass both the right to manage land and the right to control the income from its production, have much deeper implications than mere access. For many women, access to land and property is essential to the production of food and to sustainable livelihoods, but is dependent on natal and marital affiliations. In many countries, women can lose rights to land when there is a change in marital status, including marriage, divorce, or the death of a spouse.

=== Male dominance ===
Because of the worldwide prevalence of patrilineal inheritance customs, both productive resources and property such as household goods have ended up in the hands of men and not women. When only men have rights of inheritance or family succession, women have little opportunity to improve their status or living conditions within the family and community. Consequently, they are rendered dependent on male relatives for survival and have little say over how property is used to generate income or to support families. Additionally, within patrilineal communities, there is strong resistance among men to endowing women, especially daughters, with rights to land access.

== Barriers to change status ==
=== Inadequate laws and systems of enforcement ===
While there is a growing number of contemporary laws, as framed by the modern State, which give inheritance rights to daughters when they are recognized as individuals within their communities, the process of marriage and traditionally patrilineal customs have remained largely unchanged. Thus, there remains a mismatch between marriage practices and inheritance laws, with the strength and biases of marriage practices often overriding inheritance laws. This is also evident in dowry practices. In many cultures, a daughter's dowry is viewed by her family as her portion of the inheritance, even though it is typically absorbed by the new husband and his family. Thus, while in some communities women do have the formal right to inherit land, the social representation of inheritance in the form of dowries and the strength of the practice of marriage override the law.

=== Lack of awareness existing laws and insufficient understanding of legal redress options ===
Levels of education, often the product of restrictions on women's interaction with institutions primarily composed of men, create a mystique and illusion around legal action. Additionally, ideologies about expected female conduct, which normally emphasize docility, can attach shame to challenging persisting gender inequalities in law, policy and land rights.

=== Prevalence of traditional attitudes and practices ===
Gender ideologies, or beliefs and stereotypes of the expected characteristics of a particular gender, provide a barrier for women to gain property rights and enhance status. These ideologies may take the form of assumptions of the role that a woman plays in society, her needs or capabilities, which thus affect the way that an issue is framed and implemented.

== See also ==
- Family law
- Feminism
- Land law
- Legal rights of women in history
- Married Women's Property Acts in the United States
- Married Women's Property Act 1882
- Primogeniture
