= Antonio María de la Guerra =

American politician

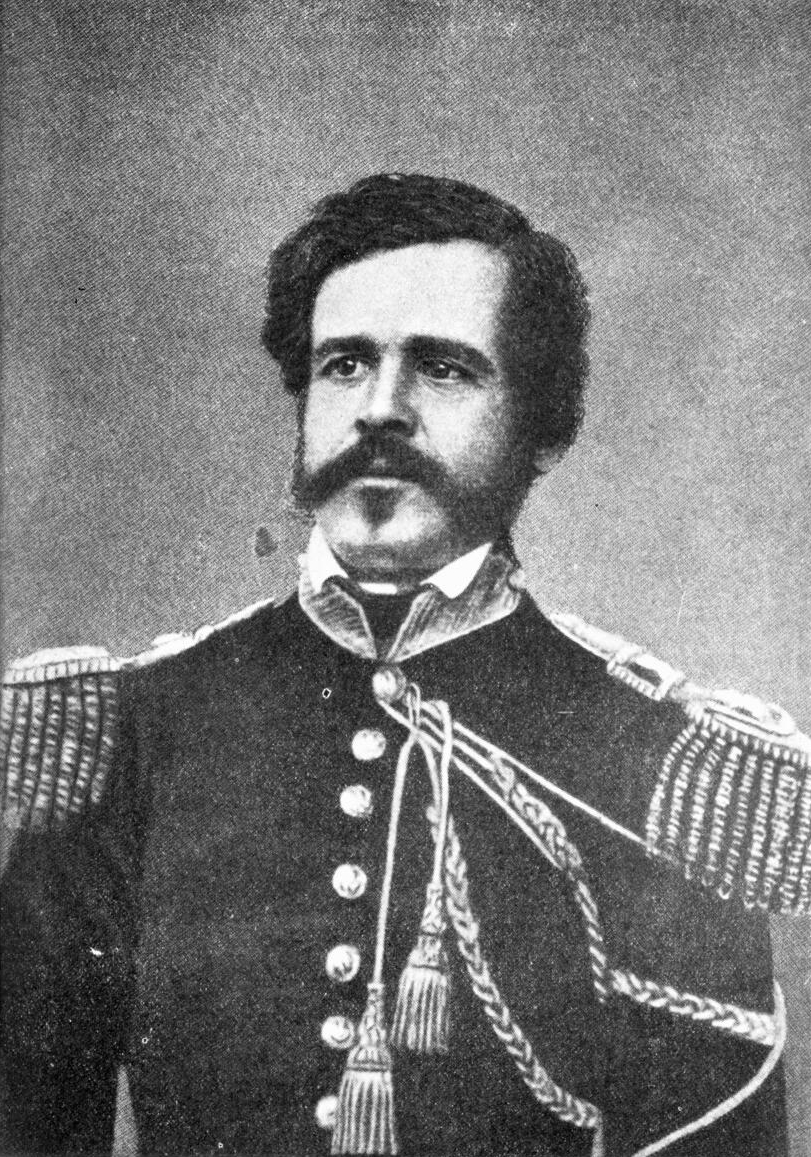

Member of the California Senate from the 3rd district
- In office January 5, 1852 – January 3, 1853
- Preceded by: Pablo de la Guerra
- Succeeded by: Pablo de la Guerra

Mayor of Santa Barbara
- In office 1856–1858
- Preceded by: H. B. Blake
- Succeeded by: Guillermo Carrillo
- In office 1859–1864
- Preceded by: Guillermo Carrillo
- Succeeded by: Francisco de la Guerra

Personal details
- Born: October 1, 1825 Santa Barbara, Alta California, Mexico
- Died: November 28, 1881 (aged 56) Goleta, California, U.S.
- Party: Democratic
- Spouse: Maria Antonia Carrillo
- Children: 14
- Profession: Politician, military officer

Military service
- Allegiance: United States
- Branch/service: United States Army
- Years of service: 1864–1866
- Rank: Captain
- Unit: 1st California Cavalry Battalion
- Battles/wars: American Civil War

Antonio María de la Guerra (October 1, 1825 – November 28, 1881) was a Californio politician and military officer, who served in the California State Senate and twice as Mayor of Santa Barbara. He also commanded the 1st California Cavalry Battalion during the Civil War and later served several terms on the Santa Barbara County Board of Supervisors.

== Early life ==
Antonio Maria de la Guerra, a member of the prominent Guerra family of California, was born in 1825 in Alta California, as the youngest son of José de la Guerra y Noriega an officer of the Mexican army. His father became a wealthy and influential man with extensive landholdings and a great house in Santa Barbara. He was educated by California mission padres and then in a Chilean college for several years.

== Career ==
In 1849, at the age of 24, he became secretary to the Santa Barbara ayuntamiento. In 1853, he served in the California Senate, and in 1857 was appointed Adjutant General for the Santa Barbara District of the California militia. He served as Mayor of Santa Barbara and was several times on the Santa Barbara County Board of Supervisors, including once being elected chairman.

On July 27, 1864, he became captain of Company C, 1st Battalion of Native Cavalry, California Volunteers recruited among the Californios of Santa Barbara for the United States Civil War. After training at Drum Barracks at Wilmington, California, he led his company to Arizona Territory in 1865. There they were stationed in Tubac and later at Fort Mason a little to the south where they were involved in the pursuit of troops the Mexican Empire that had raided into Arizona and fought against the Apache.

While in Arizona, Captain de la Guerra fell sick with a disease and was disabled, returning to Santa Barbara in February 1866. His health never recovered and he became totally blind in 1873. He eventually became paralyzed, affecting him greatly during the last years of his life. His family physician believed his health has ruined by the Mercury element used to treat him during his illness in Arizona. Never married, he died on November 28, 1881, at the age of 56. He was buried at the La Patera or Cieneguitas Catholic Cemetery, in Goleta, California on the Goleta Road, now Hollister Avenue.

== See also ==
- Alfred Robinson - Anita de la Guerra de Noriega y Carrillo
- Guerra family of California
- Casa de la Guerra
  - José de la Guerra y Noriega
  - Pablo de la Guerra
- Hispanics in the American Civil War
- List of mayors of Santa Barbara, California

== Sources ==
- Records of California men in the war of the rebellion 1861 to 1867 By California. Adjutant General's Office, SACRAMENTO: State Office, J. D. Young, Supt. State Printing. 1890.
