= Pablo de la Guerra =

American politician

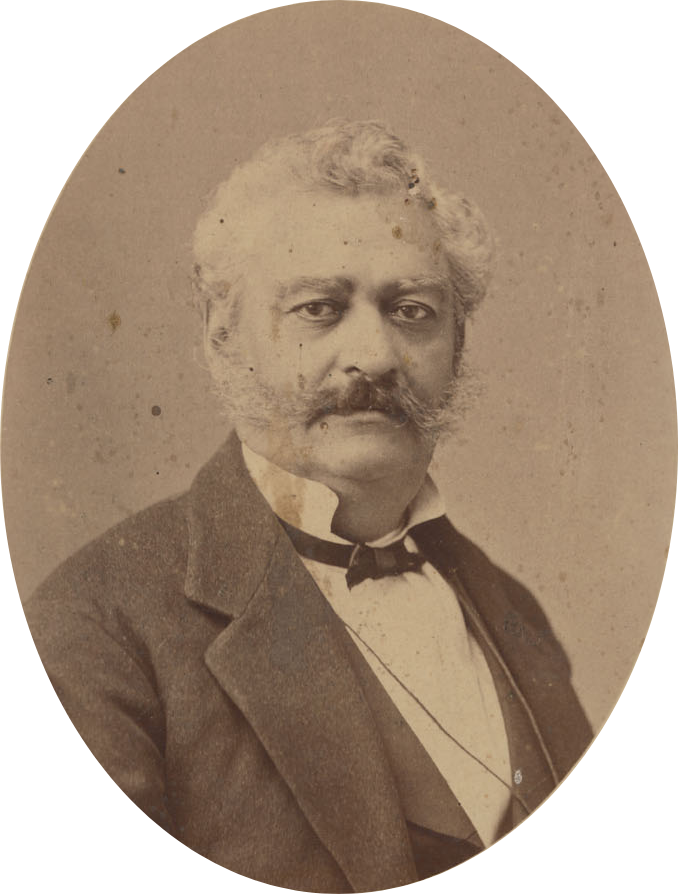
- Portrait by I. W. Taber c. 1875

8th Lieutenant Governor of California
- Acting; January 7, 1861 – January 10, 1862
- Governor: John G. Downey
- Preceded by: Isaac N. Quinn (acting)
- Succeeded by: John F. Chellis

Member of the California Senate
- In office January 2, 1860 – January 6, 1862
- Preceded by: Romualdo Pacheco
- Succeeded by: James Russell Vineyard
- Constituency: 2nd district
- In office January 2, 1854 – January 4, 1858
- Preceded by: Stephen Clark Foster
- Succeeded by: Romualdo Pacheco
- Constituency: 2nd district
- In office December 17, 1849 – January 5, 1852
- Preceded by: Constituency established
- Succeeded by: Antonio María de la Guerra
- Constituency: San Luis Obispo and Santa Barbara districts (1849–1851); 3rd district (1851–1852)

Personal details
- Born: November 29, 1819 Santa Barbara, Alta California, Viceroyalty of New Spain (now California, U.S.)
- Died: February 5, 1874 (aged 54) Santa Barbara, California, U.S.
- Party: Whig (before 1853); Democratic (after 1853)
- Relatives: Romualdo Pacheco (cousin); Guerra family
- Profession: Politician, judge, military officer

Pablo de la Guerra (29 November 1819 – 5 February 1874) was a Californio politician, judge, and signer of the Californian Constitution in 1849. He served several terms in the California State Senate between 1849 and 1862, and as acting lieutenant governor of California from 1861 to 1862.

== Personal information ==
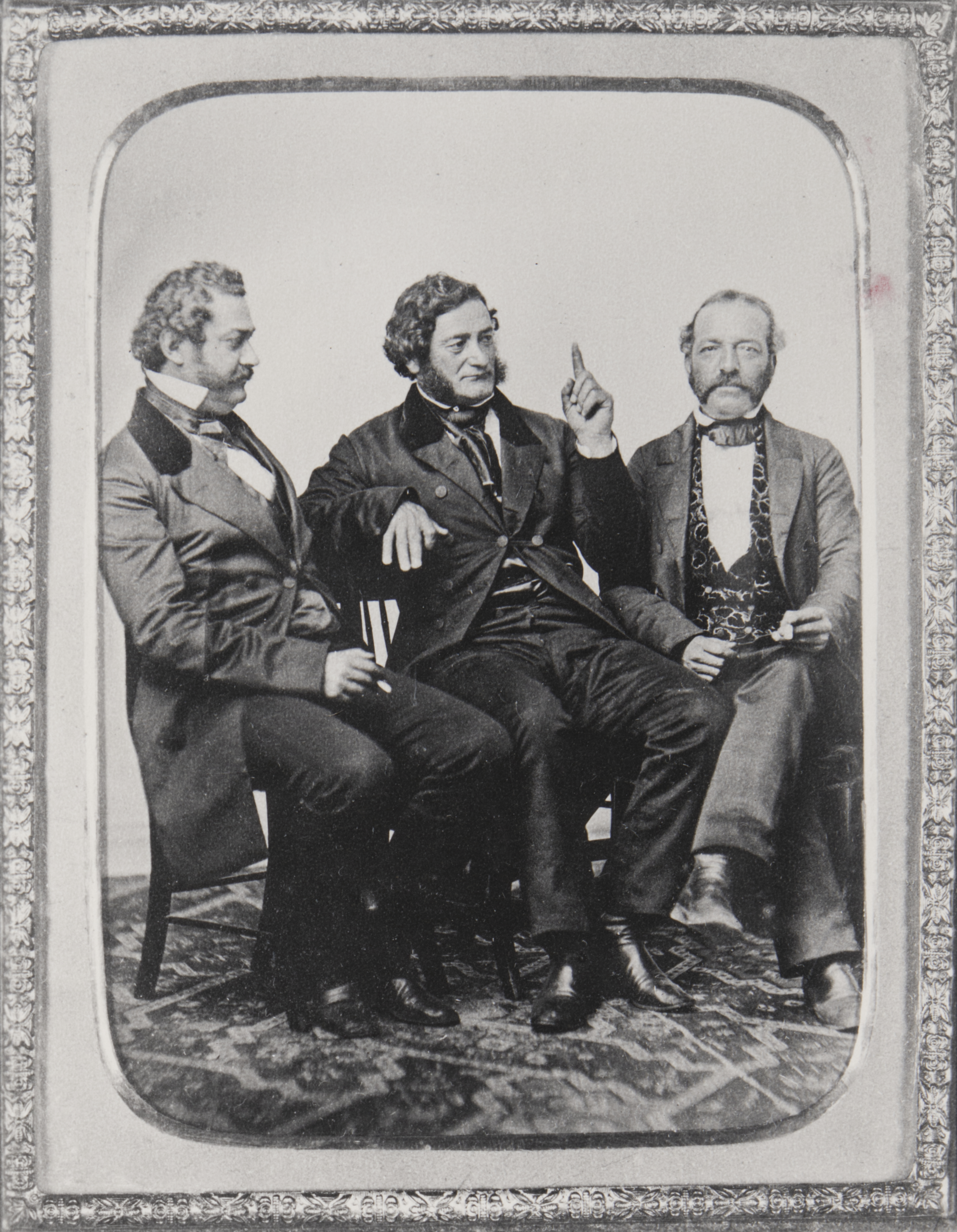
Portrait of Pablo de la Guerra, Salvador Vallejo and Andrés Pico

Pablo, a member of the Guerra family of California (a prominent Californio family), was born on 29 November 1819, in Santa Barbara, California.

== Career ==
In 1838, Guerra became an Administrator. In 1849, he served as a delegate representing the Santa Barbara District at the First California Constitutional Convention.

On 1 May 1851, he nearly resigned from the State Senate, but returned to the position which he held until 1861 when he became the leader of the senate, which led to his term as acting lieutenant governor.

From 1861-62, he served as the Acting Lieutenant Governor. From 1863-73 he was the District Judge for the 17th Judicial District.

== Death ==
Pablo de la Guerra died 5 February 1874, aged 54, in Santa Barbara, California.

== See also ==
- Casa de la Guerra
  - José de la Guerra y Noriega
  - Pablo de la Guerra
- Alfred Robinson - Anita de la Guerra de Noriega y Carrillo
- People v. de la Guerra

== Read more ==
- Pablo de la Guerra Speaks Out Against Injustice

Political offices
Preceded by Isaac N. Quinn; Acting Lieutenant Governor	Acting Lieutenant Governor of California; 1861–1862	Succeeded by John F. Chellis; Lieutenant Governor
