= José de la Guerra y Noriega =

Californio military officer (1779–1858)

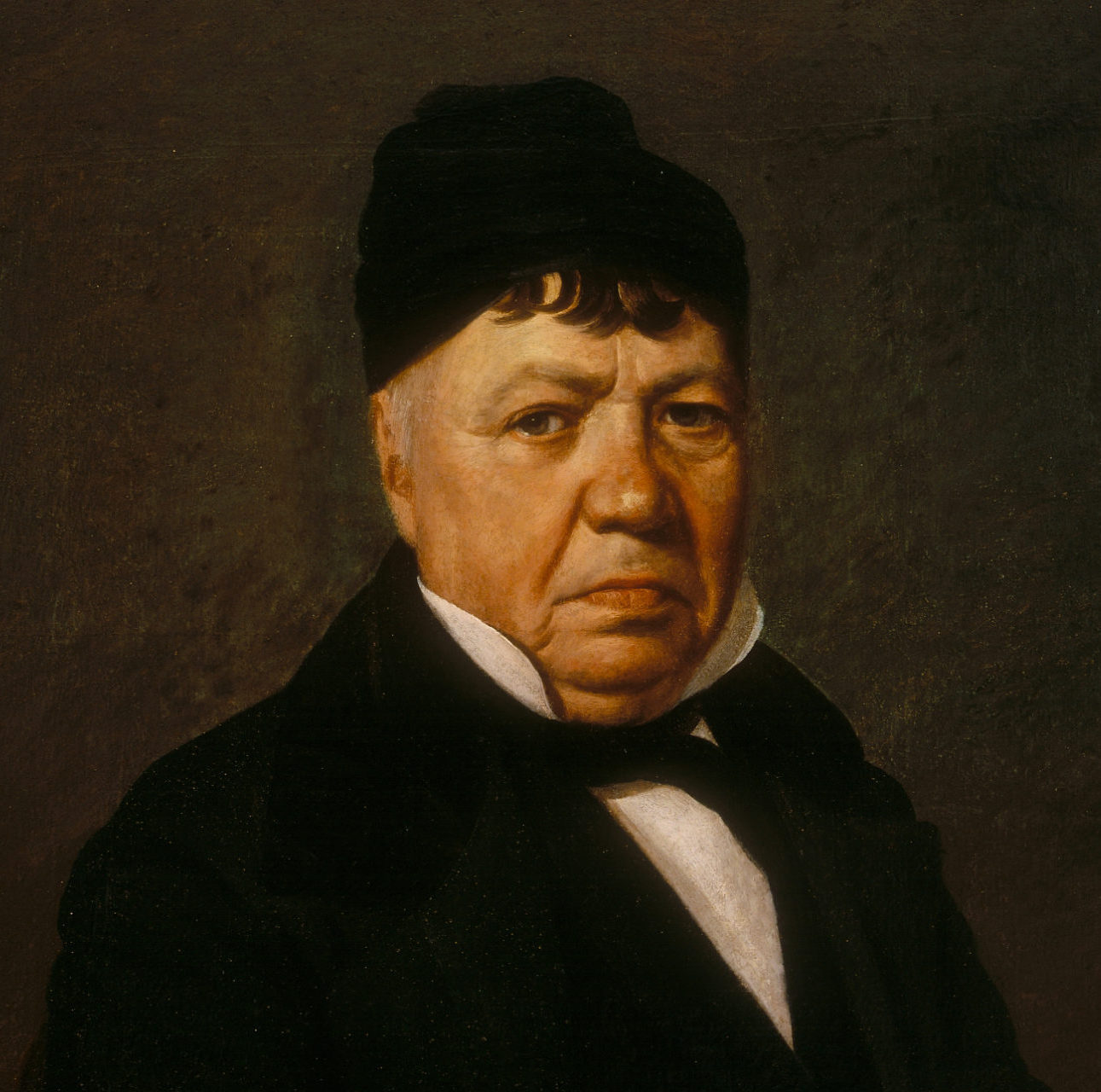
- Portrait by Leonardo Barbieri, c. 1850

Member of the Congress of the Union of the United Mexican States
- In office 1827–1828
- Constituency: Alta California

Commandant of the Presidio of Santa Barbara
- In office 1827-1842

Commandant of the Presidio of San Diego
- In office 1807-1808

Acting Commandant of the Presidio of Monterey
- In office 1804

Personal details
- Born: 1779
- Died: 1858 (aged 78–79)
- Profession: Politician, military officer

José Antonio de la Guerra y Noriega (March 6, 1779 – February 18, 1858) was a Californio military officer, politician, ranchero, and founder of the prominent Guerra family of California. He served as the Commandant of the Presidio of Santa Barbara and the Presidio of San Diego.

== Biography ==
José de la Guerra was born 1779 at Novales, Cantabria, Spain. When he was 13 De La Guerra went to Mexico City in New Spain, to live with his maternal uncle Pedro Gonzales de Noriega, a wealthy merchant.

De La Guerra joined the frontier army in 1793, working for the paymaster general. In 1796, his uncle the major merchant obtained permission to export otter hides from Acapulco to Manila on the galleon. De la Guerra was appointed a cadet in 1798 at the Presidio of San Diego in Alta California. He was promoted to alférez (ensign) at the Presidio of Monterey in 1800, and was its acting Commandant in 1804. In 1806 he was made lieutenant at the Presidio of Santa Barbara. From 1807 to 1815 he was lieutenant at the Presidio of San Diego, and was, for a short time during 1806–1807 the commandant.

From 1815, De La Guerra served at Santa Barbara, becoming captain in 1817. He became Commandant in 1827, succeeding José Darío Argüello, who was promoted to Governor of Alta California. De La Guerra also became a Deputy (diputado) to the Mexican National Congress in 1827. De La Guerra served as Commandant until 1842, when he retired after 52 years of service in the army. De La Guerra was a Californio popularly known as El Capitán.

From land grants and purchases, De La Guerra became owner of over 1/2 million acres (2000 km^{2}) in present Santa Barbara, Ventura, Marin, and Sacramento counties, California. These include Rancho Simi, Rancho Las Posas, Rancho San Julian, Rancho Los Alamos and Rancho El Conejo.

De La Guerra married María Antonia Carrillo (January 8, 1786 - December 26, 1843), daughter of José Raimundo Carrillo, on May 16, 1804. They had seven sons (Jose Antonio, Juan, Francisco, Pablo, Joaquin, Miguel, and Antonio Maria) and four daughters (Teresa, Angustias, Anita, and María Antonia).

De La Guerra died in 1858 and is buried in the church crypt at Mission Santa Barbara with his wife. His house, called the Casa de la Guerra, still stands and is a historic landmark of downtown Santa Barbara.

== See also ==
- Casa de la Guerra
  - Pablo de la Guerra
  - Antonio Maria de la Guerra
  - Alfred Robinson - Anita de la Guerra de Noriega y Carrillo
- Ranchos of California
  - List of Ranchos of California
