= Presidio of Santa Barbara =

- Santa Barbara Presidio
- U.S. National Register of Historic Places
- California Historical Landmark
- Original section of Cañedo Adobe and the rebuilt chapel from Canon Perdido Street
- Location: Santa Barbara, California
- Coordinates: 34°25′21.24″N 119°41′49.56″W
- Built: April 21, 1782
- Architectural style: California mission
- NRHP reference No.: 73000455
- CHISL No.: 636

Significant dates
- Added to NRHP: November 26, 1973
- Designated CHISL: 1958

El Presidio Real de Santa Bárbara, also known as the Royal Presidio of Santa Barbara, is a former colonial military building in Santa Barbara, California, United States. The presidio was built by Spain in 1782 to defend the Second Military District in California. In modern times, the Presidio serves as a tourist attraction, museum and an active archaeological site as part of El Presidio de Santa Barbara State Historic Park.

The park contains an original adobe structure named El Cuartel, which is the second oldest surviving building in California. The Presidio of Santa Barbara has the distinction of being the last military outpost built by Spain in its "New World" colonies. The Presidio became a California Historical Landmark in 1958 and was listed on the U.S. National Register of Historic Places in 1973.

== Contemporary setting and use ==
The original Chapel was damaged by earthquakes and later destroyed by Buddhist Chinese. This building dates from 1960's during site's restoration

The current El Presidio de Santa Barbara State Historic Park site sits between Anacapa and Garden Street on East Canon Perdido Street in downtown Santa Barbara. The main portion of the site is across the street from the Santa Barbara city Post Office, and is about two blocks from city hall, De la Guerra Plaza and two other museums, the Santa Barbara Historical Museum and the Casa de la Guerra and includes a reconstructed quadrangle with soldiers' quarters and a chapel.

Only two portions of the original presidio quadrangle survive to this day: a remnant of the Cañedo Adobe, named for José María Cañedo, the Soldado de Cuera to whom it was deeded in lieu of back pay when the Presidio fell to inactivity, and the remnants of a two-room soldiers quarters, called El Cuartel. The Cañedo Adobe is currently serving as the visitor center for the state park, and El Cuartel is largely unmodified. The site administrator, the Santa Barbara Trust for Historic Preservation (SBTHP), reconstructed the rest of the site, with the most recent construction—two rooms in the northwest corner of the site—finished in May 2006. The reconstruction is ongoing, with the more recent construction of two more rooms in the northwest corner.

The Presidio Chapel and courtyard were also completed during the construction of the quadrangle. The chapel is occasionally used for civic events such as musical concerts and lectures. Although not a canonical Roman Catholic oratory, Roman Catholic weddings are occasionally performed in the chapel with the permission of the local Roman Catholic Santa Barbara Pastoral Regional bishop.

== History ==
The site of the Presidio was chosen by Felipe de Neve, the fourth governor of Las Californias. Perceiving that the coast at Santa Barbara was vulnerable to attack, he located a spot near a harbor which was sheltered from severe storms. In addition, there was an ample supply of both building materials and water nearby. Construction began on April 21, 1782, and Padre Junípero Serra blessed the site. By the next year, a temporary facility had been completed, and a wheat field planted by the local Chumash Indians of Chief Yanonalit. The early Presidio consisted of mud and brush walls around a quadrangle 330 feet on a side. The post had 61 officers and men in 1783.

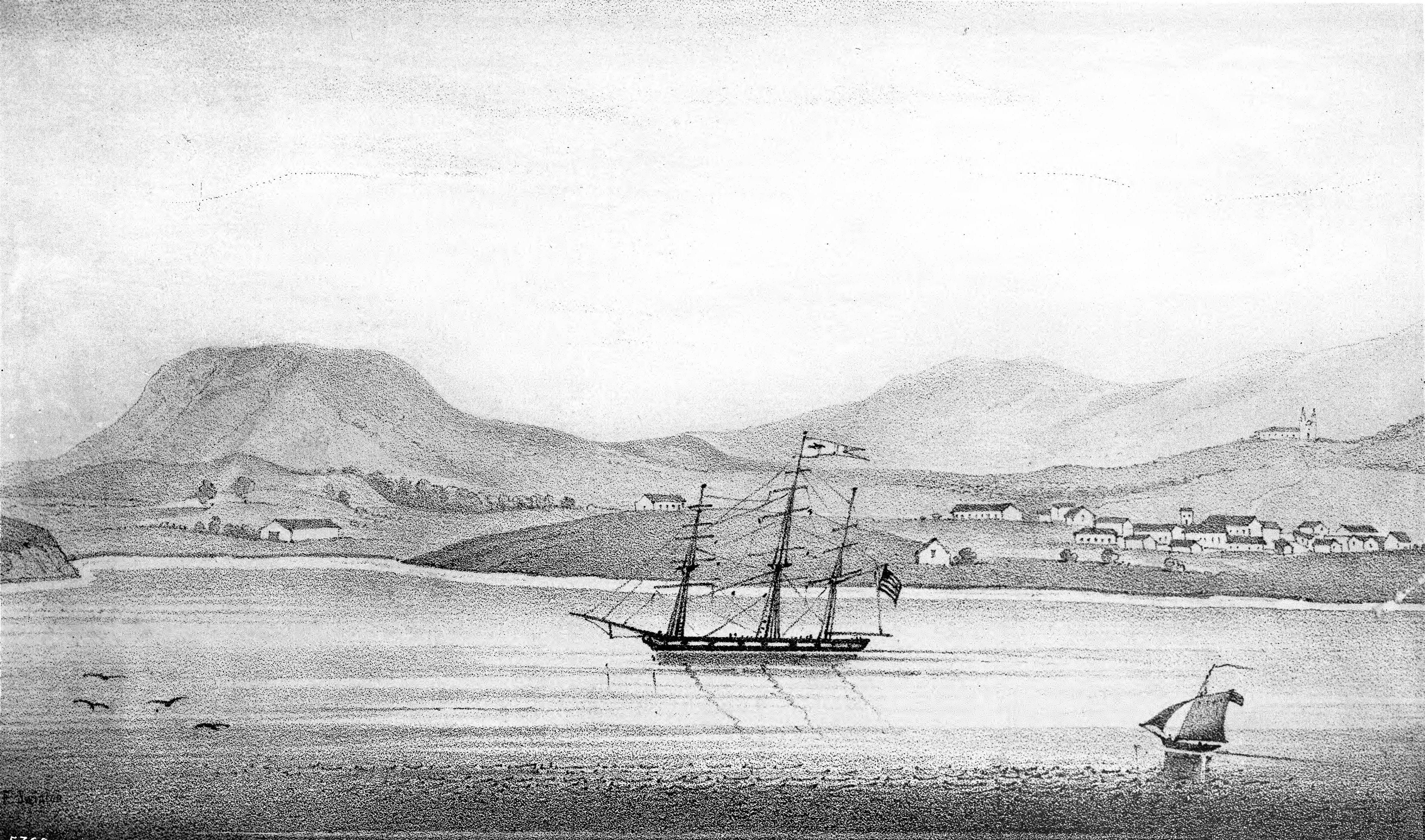
Drawing of the presidio of early Santa Barbara, ca.1839

The first comandante, José Francisco Ortega, planned the fortifications and irrigation works. He obtained livestock for the presidio from Mission San Buenaventura, established orchards, and began large-scale farming. In 1784, Felipe de Goicoechea took over as comandante, supervising construction of the fortifications and living quarters for the soldiers and their families. Two years later, construction of the nearby Mission Santa Barbara began in 1786. The pueblo or town of Santa Barbara developed around the Presidio, which offered protection for the residents. The chapel in the Presidio was the primary place of worship for the residents of early Santa Barbara, until its destruction by the 1857 Fort Tejon earthquake. The mission, located a mile and a half inland, was mainly intended for use by the native Chumash (Barbareño) neophytes after their conversion to Catholicism.

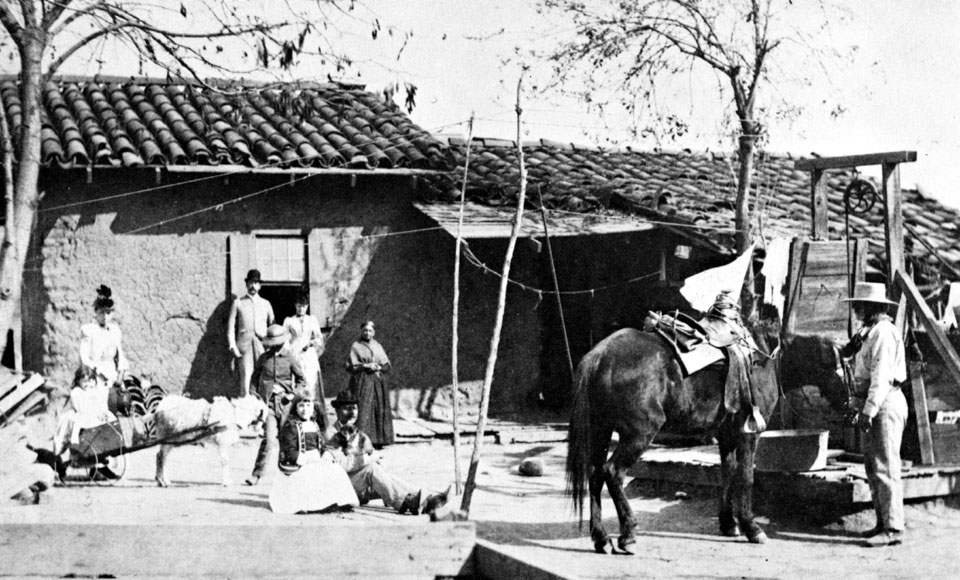
El Cuartel as a house in 1880

The Presidio was built to standard plans for a Spanish colonial military headquarters, using locally available materials, so the buildings forming the outer square were constructed with thick, solid adobe outer walls. The main gate opened into an open parade ground/plaza in the center of the square. The chapel stood at the center of the back of the square, facing the gate across the plaza. While it was never attacked by a strong military force during its sixty years of operation, the Presidio was subject to the assaults of nature. Several devastating earthquakes in the early 19th century destroyed much of the structure.

In 1855 the Presidio Chapel grew into the Apostolic College of Our Lady of Sorrows, which soon became Our Lady of Sorrows Church at the corner of Figueroa and State Streets, and then at the corner of Anacapa and Sola streets in 1929.

== Mexican–American War ==
At the time of the Mexican–American War in Alta California, very little of the fortress remained in usable condition, and on December 27, 1846, John C. Frémont ascended San Marcos Pass during rainy weather and came up on the Presidio and the town from behind. The Presidio surrendered without a fight, as the garrison was far south in the Pueblo de Los Angeles. Frémont had heard that the Mexican army was lying in ambush for him at Gaviota Pass, the only other sensible route over the mountains at that time, and had crossed the difficult muddy track on San Marcos Pass to outflank them, but this move turned out not to have been necessary. Mexican General Andrés Pico later surrendered his force to Frémont, recognizing that the war was lost.

== Preservation ==
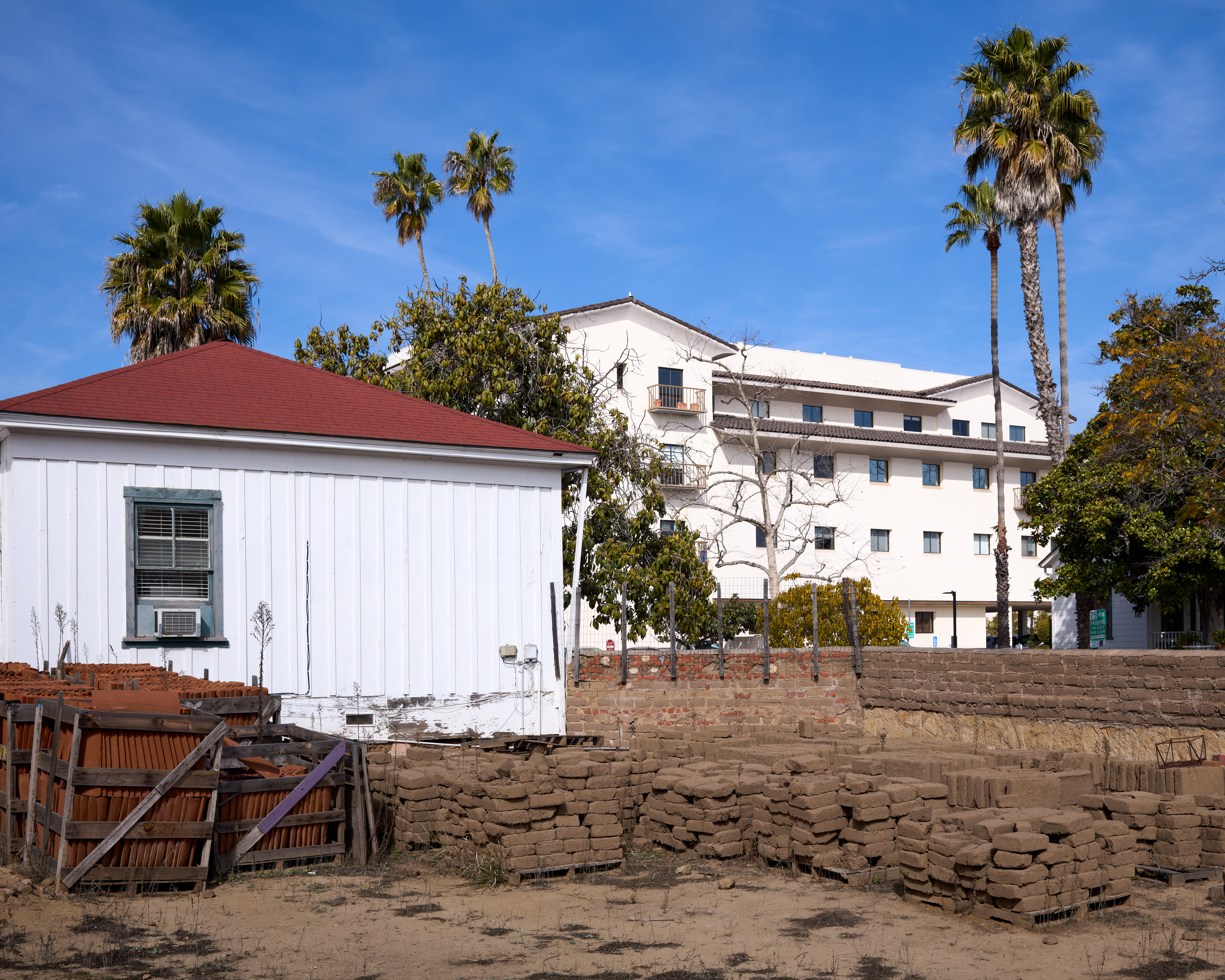
Bricks and roof shingles for restoration of buildings at the Presidio of Santa Barbara in February 2025

In 1963, the Santa Barbara Trust for Historic Preservation (SBTHP) was founded, with the primary mission of restoring the Presidio. In 1966, the land on which the Presidio is located became a State Historic Park. On December 27, 2006, the SBTHP renewed their ongoing agreement with the California State Parks Department to manage the Presidio. Work on the restoration is currently taking place. On November 26, 1973, the Presidio of Santa Barbara was added to the U.S. National Register of Historic Places.

The Presidio of Santa Barbara is a participating site of the Juan Bautista de Anza National Historic Trail, a National Park Service area in the United States National Trails System.

== See also ==
- Military districts in Spanish California
- History of Santa Barbara, California
- California Historical Landmarks in Santa Barbara County, California
- Bibliography of California history
