= Anna Gurney =

British academic (1795–1857)

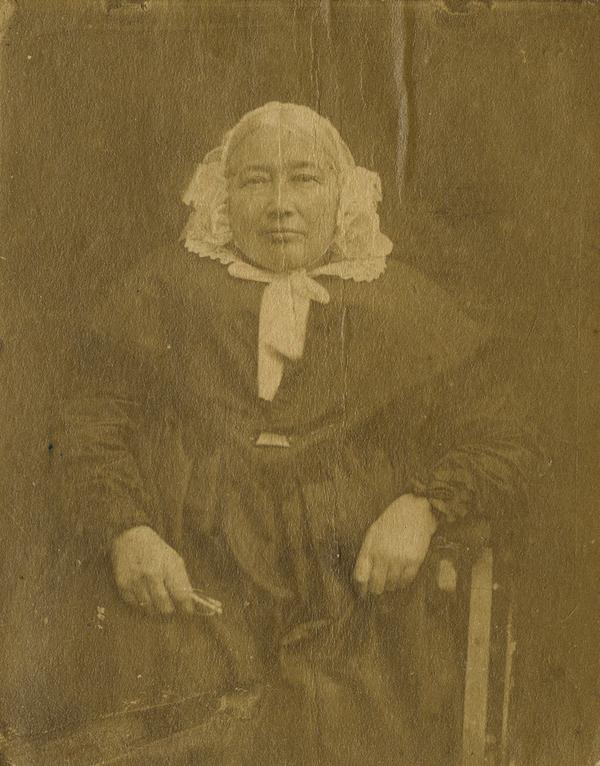
- An undated photograph of Gurney
- Born: 31 December 1795
- Died: 6 June 1857 (aged 61); Keswick, Norfolk, England
- Resting place: St Martin's, Overstrand, Norfolk
- Notable work: A Literal Translation of the Saxon Chronicle (1819); Report of the Parliamentary Select Committee on the Aboriginal Tribes (British Settlements) (1837)

Anna Gurney (31 December 1795–6 June 1857) was an Old English scholar, philologist, philanthropist, geologist, archaeologist, botanist, abolition campaigner, and member of the Gurney family of Norfolk.

A daughter to Richard and Rachel Gurney, Anna was brought up a Quaker. She learnt Latin, Greek, Hebrew, and Anglo-Saxon from an early age, in 1819 anonymously publishing for private circulation A Literal Translation of the Saxon Chronicle, the first translation of this text. She lived in a cottage at Northrepps from 1825 with Sarah-Maria Buxton, the pair becoming known as the "Cottage Ladies". Here, the pair worked with Thomas Fowell Buxton from 1834 on a campaign over the treatment of indigenous peoples in the British Empire which resulted in the Parliamentary Select Committee on Aboriginal Tribes, for which Gurney wrote the bulk of its final report. Gurney lived at the Northrepps cottage for the remainder of her life after Sarah Buxton's death in 1839, though continued to travel the world and study new languages. She was the first woman to be elected as a member of both the British Archaeological Association and the Philological Society, in 1845 and 1847 respectively. Following her death in 1857 at the house of her half-brother Hudson Gurney in Keswick near Norwich, she was buried in St Martin's Church in Overstrand.

== Early life and education ==
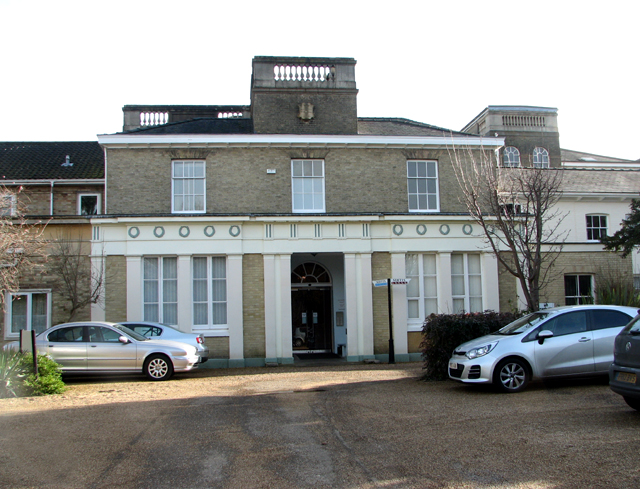
Anna lived at Keswick Hall, the seat of the Gurney family, from childhood.

Anna Gurney was born on 31 December 1795, likely at Keswick Hall, near Norwich, Norfolk, in England. She was daughter to Richard Gurney (1742–1811) and his second wife Rachel Gurney, née Hanbury (c. 1763–1825). Richard Gurney worked as a partner of Gurney's Bank. Anna's siblings were; Richard Gurney, and her elder sister Elizabeth Gurney, and she also had a half brother in Hudson Gurney (1775–1864), who was twenty years her senior. Anna lived at Keswick Hall from childhood, alongside Sarah-Maria Buxton, sister of Thomas Fowell Buxton. Thomas was the husband of Anna's cousin, Hannah Gurney. The Gurney family were prominent Quakers.

As a child, (10 months old) Gurney contracted a disease which was probably polio, described as a "paralytic affliction", as the disease paralysed her lower limbs, meaning from a young age and for the rest of her life Anna Gurney was a wheelchair user. Richard Gurney, her father, owned two properties; Keswick Hall and Northrepps Hall, the latter being near Cromer, Norfolk. He would die in 1811, after which Anna stayed with her mother at Northrepps Cottage, also known as Overstrand Cottage, on the Northrepps estate.

Anna Gurney was schooled at home, and was brought up a Quaker. Her sister Elizabeth, her cousin Catherine Gurney, and a tutor would give her her early education. At an early age, she learnt Latin, Greek, Hebrew, and Anglo-Saxon (also known as Old English); her first steps in foreign and medieval languages were overseen by her half-brother Hudson Gurney, an adult by the time of Richard Gurney's death. She was once found as a child with an Anglo-Saxon grammar under her pillow.

== Career ==
Throughout Gurney's adult life, Anna devoted resources and time to many different causes. This included abolition work, education for children, and geology. She mainly focused her geological research on local portions of the Cromer Forest Bed formation. As adults, she and Hudson Gurney would share scholarly interests, and for decades would exchange letters almost daily. As an adult, she converted from being a Quaker to Anglicanism, and was baptised as such.

=== 1817–25: Translations of the Anglo-Saxon Chronicle and other texts ===
Gurney in 1817 created a translation of the Kongs-Skugg-Sio, or, Speculum regale, a Norwegian text. This received a private and local printing, and was only circulated amongst her family.

Gurney's A Literal Translation of the Saxon Chronicle (1819) was the first English translation of the Anglo-Saxon Chronicle.

In 1819, at age 23, she published A Literal Translation of the Saxon Chronicle, for which she is remembered most. Gurney identified herself for the work only through the sobriquet "A Lady in the Country." She stated in its preface that this work was far along when she had learned that a full collected edition by James Ingram, at the time a former Rawlinson Professor of Anglo-Saxon at Oxford University, was about to be published. This caused her to go ahead with publication but only "for private circulation" in a limited impression. As a result, few copies of this work survive today. She only had access to the printed texts rather than the original sources for the translation. A Literal Translation was the first translation of the Anglo-Saxon Chronicle. It was commended by the academic Ingram when he finally published his Saxon Chronicle with Translations in 1823. Gurney's translation was compared to that of Ingram by reviewers, who favoured Gurney's, and it retained its positive reputation through to the 20th century as it was accurate, literal, clear, and plain in style. Positive reviews included Sir Francis Palgrave calling it a "remarkable work for a young woman", and John Mitchell Kemble calling it "very creditable".

In 1820, she produced a translation of 'A Saxon homily on St Neot'. This was published in an anonymous fashion as a part of Norfolk antiquary George Gorham's work.

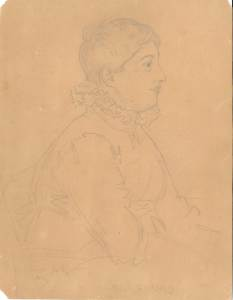
Gurney by John Linnell, 15 February 1824

She became known for her philanthropic maritime rescue efforts on the coastline of Norfolk, directing rescue operations from the shore before offering foreign sailors food and shelter, and talking to them in their own languages. In 1825, she wrote the pamphlet On Means of Assistance in Cases of Shipwreck, which would be included in an edited version in The Fisherman's Friendly Visitor and Mariner's Companion, a magazine. She procured at her own expense for the town of Sheringham a Manby mortar, also known as a Manby Life Saving Rocket. This was an apparatus used to fire a line to a ship in peril.

=== 1825–34: Northrepps Cottage, Sarah Buxton, philanthropy and the Belfry School ===
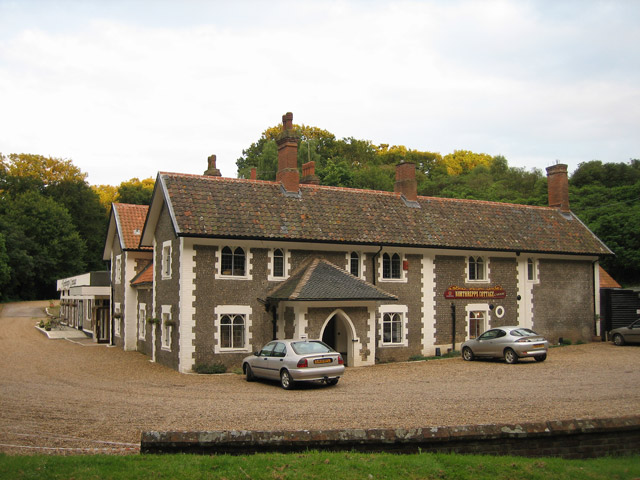
Gurney lived in Northrepps Cottage, where she had stayed with her mother in 1811, from 1825 until her death. As of 2019, it is known as Northrepps Cottage Country Hotel.

In 1825, after the death of her mother, her home became Northrepps Cottage, and she lived with Sarah Buxton, in a household that was matriarchal. Here, they established a base of operations for their political, scientific and artistic work. They shared an interest in zoology, natural history, and fossils, and worked together on animal welfare campaigns.

From 1827, when the Buxtons also moved to the Northrepps estate at Northrepps Hall, Gurney became part of the Buxtons' close family circle. While she and Buxton were not involved in the family's dealings in London, they were heavily engaged in their activities in Norfolk. Gurney campaigned on local Norfolk issues, sponsoring initiatives to improve the safety of local fishermen and gaining popularity through these efforts. Gurney thus established and maintained lifeboat services by Overstrand, and additionally pressured Thomas Fowell Buxton to raise discussion on lifeguard stations in the House of Commons. In 1830, Gurney lobbied Trinity House to install a light off Happisburgh; the effort was successful, and the light was set up on a small lifeboat by Happisburgh's most dangerous area of sand. It became known as the 'Gurney light'.

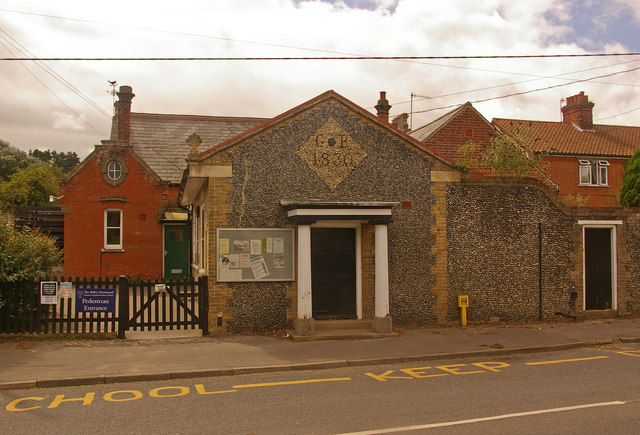
The Belfry School in Overstrand, an elementary school founded and run by Gurney and Buxton.

During their time together, Gurney and Buxton founded and ran an elementary school known as the Belfry School, located in a cobble building in Overstrand. This building notably features the initials G and B, for Gurney and Buxton, in pink pebbles at its front. The cost for each child was 1d per week. As of 2016, there was still a school at the building. On top of this, Anna also educated young women while also hosting labouring men's evening classes. Her teaching was progressive and thorough, and had "an emphasis on encouragement with sweets, rather than punishment"; this was innovative at the time. They additionally gave adult tuition at Northrepps Cottage, including to William Forster in his early political career; he would later become a Liberal MP. Gurney and Sarah Buxton also financed the construction of a road through Overstrand and other infrastructure, and ran several local charities such as a clothing charity and Bible clubs. The pair also travelled Britain and Europe, being carried up a glacier at Grindelwald. While supportive of the efforts of Thomas Buxton and in close touch with him, there is scant evidence of Gurney and Sarah Buxton being involved in the Buxtons' political activities until 1834.

In 1831, Sir Francis Palgrave published a dedicatory epistle to Anna Gurney in his first volume of his History of England. In it, he described writing the book while with her at Northrepps Cottage. The pair had shared a lively scholarly and personal correspondence, possibly after Palgrave was introduced to her as the son-in-law of Dawson Turner, a close friend of Hudson Gurney. In 1834, Anna Gurney and Buxton were compiling a commonplace book together; in this, they recorded an anonymously authored poem "Lines for the 1st of August 1834 Sung by 100 Children on the Lawn at Colne House", this being the home of Priscilla Buxton's brother Edward in Norfolk. This poem expressed support for the abolition of slavery:

Now let our hearts unite and raise
A humble song of grateful praise
To Him who bids the oppressed go free
And gives the Slave his liberty
A day long wished on Britons' part
To soothe and heal the broken heart
To send the gospel’s joyful sound,
And preach the Word on Slavery’s ground
[...]
And let us lift our hearts in prayer
For North Repps' Friends tho' absent here
That richest blessings may be shed
Upon our Champion! Buxton’s head.

The children at their Belfry School were similarly instructed to sing the hymn 'the year of jubilee' to celebrate the abolition of slavery.

=== 1834–39: Campaign for indigenous populations in the British Empire ===
In August 1834, Priscilla Buxton withdrew from assisting her father Thomas Fowell Buxton, because of her marriage to Andrew Johnston and decision to spend time on their Scottish estate. Thomas at the time was leading the Society for the Extinction of the Slave Trade and the Civilization of Africa, as well as a campaign highlighting the injustices committed by the British Empire on its indigenous peoples. At Northrepps Cottage, Anna and Sarah Buxton thus took over from Priscilla Buxton's role in the campaign for a period of six months, though continued their work with Thomas after the newly married couple returned to London in spring 1835. Anna and Priscilla, occasionally damaging their health, frequently worked twelve-hour days during this period, usually composing Thomas's speeches. Kathryn Gleadle has argued that Anna and Priscilla's work operated under 'Thomas Fowell Buxton' like a brand name.

One aim of the political project was to allow the Xhosa people, on the Cape coast, to be treated in a humanitarian manner, and Anna and Sarah gathered masses of data such as statistics on the economic condition of the indigenous population in order to oppose the government's accused punitive action on these people. After the group heard of the death of Hintsa kaKhawuta, king of the Xhosa Kingdom, Anna drew up a pamphlet to be signed by Thomas and submitted to the Colonial Office. Anna and Sarah worked to sift and cull evidence from missionary and government sources in preparation for Thomas's second parliamentary speech on aborigines in July 1835, selecting the most compelling pieces of evidence for Thomas's use in private and parliamentary lobbying. Anna suggested that the specific South Africa campaign should become a parliamentary committee about the wider status of 'aborigines' in all British settlements. Working from this, Thomas was able to use Anna and Sarah's material influence the evangelical Secretary of State for the Colonies, Lord Glenelg, to inquire into all British settlements in terms of the treatment of colonial subjects. An Aborigines Select Committee thus began in August 1835. Thomas credited Anna for this success, writing to her, "[O]wing exclusively to you the committee was formed, & that saved a nation".

In the midst of this, Gurney's Translation of the Ynglinga saga was published in 1836. Norfolk antiquary William Gunn was one of those who received it. That year, Anna and Sarah went to Frankfurt, and were invited to an audience with Princess Elizabeth.

==== Report of the Parliamentary Select Committee on the Aboriginal Tribes (British Settlements) ====
In 1837, a two-volume report titled Report of the Parliamentary Select Committee on the Aboriginal Tribes (British Settlements), the result of the select committee inquiry, was published. Gurney wrote the bulk of this 86-page humanitarian report, spending the winter of 1836–7 creating its drafts. It drew on over 600 pages of evidence that had been gathered during the select committee's hearings over the previous two years. The Buxtons referred to it as "Aunt Anna's Report", and Thomas wrote to her that "‘I hardly know how to look when they commend me—knowing as I do how little a portion [of the report] justly belongs to me."

The report made the argument that indigenous people turned to self-destructive practices such as alcoholism as a result of their oppression, and that those oppressed by colonialism would become Christians and become part of the colonial economy if they were allowed to do so as equals. It concluded that all over Earth, "the intercourse of Europeans in general, without any exception in favour of the subjects of Great Britain, has been, unless when attended by missionary exertions, a source of many calamities to uncivilized nations". The report originally had parts which assigned blame for the war of 1834 in South Africa; these were removed by Thomas under political pressure. A letter he wrote to her says that it was "some little consolation that you will save half a dozen nations from extermination". The report led to the withdrawal of British troops from Xhosa territories, which was one of its objectives.

=== 1839–57: Death of Sarah Buxton, abolition work, European travels and scholarship ===
Sarah-Maria Buxton died in 1839. As a result of her own insistence, Gurney authored and spoke a funeral oration, led her funeral service, and wrote her a poem for her gravestone. Gurney continued to inhabit the cottage for the remainder of her life; she from this time was referred to as "Anna Gurney of Northrepps Cottage".

In 1840, The Remedy, a sequel to The African Slave Trade (1839), was published. While it is credited to Thomas Fowell Buxton and he composed its initial draft, and Priscilla Buxton did most of the work, Sarah Buxton and Anna Gurney had had close involvement.

Gurney worked with Amelia Opie, a close family friend of the Gurneys and Buxtons, to create a ladies' anti-slavery society in Norwich. Opie was known to refer to Anna Gurney as 'Dr Gurney'.

In 1841 in Archaeologia, the journal of the Society of Antiquaries, is a communication from her on The Discovery of a Gold Ornament near Mundesley in Norfolk, and a paper On the Lost City of Vineta, a submerged Phœnician city, as well as a third publication. All three are totally anonymous; they were credited to a "gentleman unnamed" when read out by George Ellis. As vice-president of the Society of Antiquaries in charge of publications, Hudson Gurney likely helped arrange publication for these pieces; these were letters sent to Sir Henry Ellis, the Principal Librarian of the British Museum, to whom she was a friend, as well as a consultant. However, there is no evidence that she used the British Museum's Reading Room. Gurney also learned a number of African languages, and wrote a grammar on the Hausa language, alongside the Reverend James Schön. Schön, a missionary, had previously been on the 1841 Niger expedition and African Baptist Augustus William Hanson, who had learned from Gurney's own philosophy of language, had taught Schön the language Accra. Gurney and Schön also translated the Bible into Accra. In addition to this, Samuel Ajayi Crowther, a former slave with whom Gurney worked, visited her around this time and additionally preached at the church in Overstrand.

Alongside the Buxtons after her partner's death, Gurney visited Rome, Athens and Argos, and was contemplating a voyage to the Baltics. When they were in Rome, a paper that she had authored by Gurney, arguing for a less cruel method of animal slaughter, was presented to the Pope and was successful. In 1845, she became an associate of the British Archaeological Association, being the first woman to join the association as a member. In 1847, she also became the first woman to be elected a member of the Philological Society. That year, she appears as a listed annual subscriber to the London Library in its second catalogue; she obtained these books through the General Post Office. In 1848, she presented a copy of her Literal Translation to the Philological Society.

Gurney appears to have contemplated publishing a revised A Literal Translation, which would have contained Norse and Welsh sections for comparison, before deciding against this. It seems as though she allowed John Allen Giles to use a significant amount of her work; this highly derivative version of the Anna's Chronicle translation was published in 1847. M. J. Toswell has argued that she would have regretted allowing this use as Giles patronised her in the acknowledgement and made scant revisions, choosing not to credit her as a translator on the title page.

In March 1850, Gurney embarked on a scholarly search for the life of Saint Edmund, becoming particularly interested in his martyring by the Vikings. This search continued at least into April, when she wrote a poem about her search:

In the year seventy, plus eight hundred,
Edmund was martyred – Suffolk plunder’d –
Well had it been for Edmund’s skin,
And for those Danes that did the sin,
If the grim Vikings, in the dark,
Had shot, like you, beside the mark –
For ‘twas the twentieth of November
Those Heathens did the saint dismember –
His head into the woods they flung,
Not thus could silence Edmund’s tongue –
Oh, that this member bodiless
Again would speak from shelf or press!
Not from green leaves, but leaves of vellum,
Would lift its voice again, & tell ‘em
His whereabouts, with accent clear,
Crying, as whilome, ‘Here! Here! Here!’,
Pray hunt, and hearken, Brother dear!

She had her own copy of the Iolo Manuscripts from 1850 after borrowing a copy the previous year, published a letter in her own name in Archaeologia in 1852, and produced an article on Norfolk Words in 1855, which was read at a Philological Society meeting.

In her later life, she studied Danish, Swedish, and Russian literature. In 1854 it was confirmed to her that her brother Richard had made Hudson Gurney his heir rather than her; she wrote that he told her, "I do not approve of women having large responsibilities", and that she "honestly acquiesced & concurred with him" as she feared that she would not be able to live up to the responsibilities that came with expanded finances. In 1856, George Borrow visited Gurney at the cottage, after stating that Gurney was one of three people in the world that he had always wanted to meet, the others being Daniel O'Connell and the derby winner Phosphorus, both of whom had died. Upon that visit, Borrow wrote that Gurney asked him to explain a difficult point in Arabic before talking over his explanation. He wrote, "I could not study the Arabic grammar and listen to her at the same time, so I threw down the book and ran out of the room." He allegedly continued running until he reached Old Tucker's Hotel at Cromer before travelling on to Sheringham.

10 days prior to Anna Gurney's death, she made a suggestion to the BAA that they should begin to publish short reports on worldwide archaeological discoveries. She offered to oversee such reports on northern antiquities. She had been developing "a compilation of derivations from the Hebrew into Greek, English, and German, to show the common origin of languages" at the time of her death. She was also making a plan for a significant restoration of the local church which would have included an extension to the building.

== Personal life ==
=== Disability ===
After contracting polio at 10 months old, Anna Gurney's lower limbs were paralysed; from a young age, she was a wheelchair user. Anna was known to sit and move around on the floor as a child, with her cousin Catherine noting in a letter that she was "busy on the floor as usual". She was seen far more frequently in her wheelchair as an adult, though was also carried in a 'car' when she went outside. She was active and flexible despite her mobility issues, and was recorded dancing with Sarah and playing skittles with the African people who visited the cottage. Northrepps Cottage received adaptations to accommodate her needs, such as adjustments made to the banisters on its main staircase which as of 2019 are still present. Sarah Austin wrote of Anna's interaction with her research environment:

When talking on her favourite subject – philology, she would suddenly and rapidly wheel away the chair in which she always sate and moved, to her well-stored bookshelves, take down a book, and return delighted to communicate some new thought or discovery.

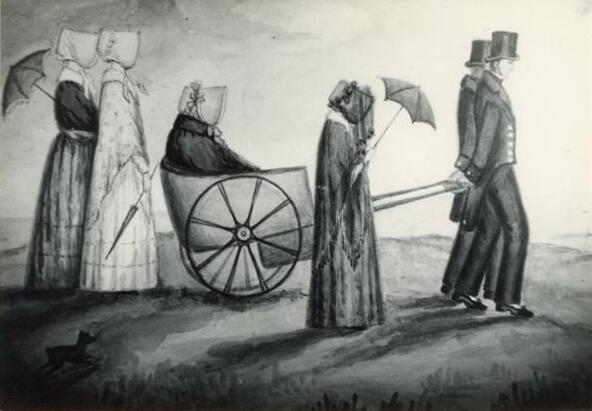
Anna Gurney being pulled by servants in a cart, attending three ladies, in a copy of a watercolour by Sarah-Maria Buxton

Gurney's financial resources, which were substantial, allowed her to make use of personal servants, though she also relied on family and friends. In cases of urgency when aiding people on the coast, she had others carry her down to the beach and directed the operations from her chair. In 1850, she remarked that her "dullness of head" and "weakness of hands" made her feel "inefficient in every way". Daniel Gurney wrote in 1857 that "She became very stout, & wheeled herself about in a chair in the house, & out of doors was carried, or dragged in a chair by two menservants". In later life, she experienced "great and frequent pain".

Helen Brookman has argued that many of the contemporary narratives of Gurney used her disability as a stock trope "as a way of domesticating her otherwise troubling political agency and sexuality", and drew on stereotypes to contrast her disability with her intelligence. Kathryn Geadle has similarly argued that depictions of Gurney "overstated her physical difficulties".

=== Relationship to Sarah Buxton ===
Zoë Laidlaw wrote in 2004 that the exact nature of the relationship between Anna Gurney and Sarah-Maria Buxton was unknown, but that they were a devoted couple. Geadle said in 2009 that they had a relationship of "deep emotional attachment", which took place prior to the creation of discourse on the idea of the lesbian. Cousins by marriage, they lived together from childhood, and they referred to each other as "my partner". On at least one occasion, Gurney called Buxton her "faithful and beloved Partner". Neither married, and they shared a bedroom for their full time living together. In the 1830s, despite being an intelligent and resourceful woman herself by all accounts, Buxton saw her role as supporting Gurney. They were known as the "Cottage Ladies"; Geadle has made the argument that references to them in this manner were "a means of obliquely hinting at, yet also containing, their unusual domestic arrangements", in a similar way to Lady Eleanor Butler and Sarah Ponsonby who were known as the "ladies of Llangollen". Gurney wrote a poem titled "Thoughts on our 8 years at the Cottage" in 1833. It considers their home as central to their shared lives and self-defines them as unmarried and childless women:

We came, enamoured of our barren choice,
We Partners came to work and to rejoice
"Pleasant the lives" to us, & care forgot
We made our Eden of the desert spot

Following Buxton's death in 1839, Thomas Buxton wrote to John Joseph Gurney, his brother-in-law, that "the affection she bore her partner was indeed remarkable, it is more than widowhood." Anna's cousin Daniel Gurney wrote that "although she had frequently intimate friends staying with her she never again had what she used to call another 'partner'".

=== Demeanor ===
Gurney was known for her altruism, likely influenced by her Quaker upbringing, as was her simple mode of dress. Gurney's mental capacities were described as 'masculine'. There is a poem attributed to Charles Buxton which describes the manner in which she engaged with the world:

But come the just cause – arise the occasion
Which pity excites, or profound indignation.
Away go the terrors and tears of her sex,
No womanish weakness her efforts shall vex –
But sagacious in counsel – and determined in deed
She has courage to dare, and persuasion to plead.
She has rescued the seaman, the caffer, the slave
From the rapine of man, from the wrath of the wave.

Reverend Edward Hoare stated in her eulogy that she did not correspond to the stereotype of an idle woman; "What a contrast did she present to the listless, fanciful, and indolent novel reader upon the sofa! How manfully did she grapple with one language after another!"

== Death ==
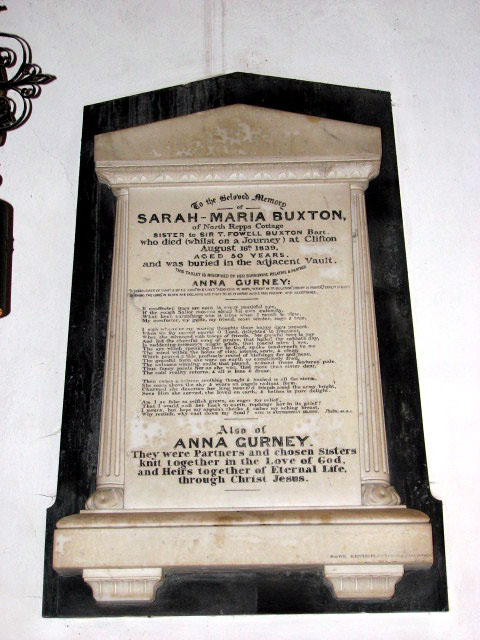
Gurney was buried alongside Sarah Maria Buxton in 1857. Part of their tablet inscription names them as "partners and chosen sisters knit together in the love of God and heirs together of eternal life through Christ Jesus."

After a short illness, Anna Gurney died at the residence of her half-brother Hudson at Keswick, near Norwich, on 6 June 1857. Her coffin was carried by local fishermen at her funeral, attended by 2,000 people. Local vicar Paul Johnson said that the elderly poor in the area were Gurney's 'pensioners' due to her support for them. She was buried in Overstrand Church. alongside Sarah Buxton. Gurney and Buxton's tablet inscription reads in part:

To the beloved memory of Sarah Maria Buxton of Northrepps Cottage sister to Sir T. Powell Buxton Bart. who died (whilst on a journey) at Clifton August 18th 1839, aged 50 years and was buried in the adjacent vault. This tablet was inscribed by her sorrowing relative and partner Anna Gurney. Also of Anna Gurney. They were partners and chosen sisters knit together in the love of God and heirs together of eternal life through Christ Jesus.

An obituary to Gurney was published in The Gentleman's Magazine. Following her death, Hudson Gurney was prompted to send Henry Ellis a copy of her work Extracts from the North Frisian Chronicle.

=== Estate ===
As Gurney had a large library at her cottage, the notes of Gurney's executors detail their finding of a large number of translations and analyses in her files following her death. These are compiled in the list of 'Anna’s MSS', listing the titles of dozens of translations, comparative collations, papers, treatises, and notes. Further works in this list mainly focused on Old English and Old Norse literary, historical, and philological material. Several of the documents were copied in the British Museum. Because she and Sarah Buxton made their own efforts to copy out and put together extracts of their family letters, abolition work and other political activity, Gurney's papers, including many letters to and from her, survive in the Norfolk County Record Office in Norwich. Hundreds of these are addressed to and from Hudson Gurney. Some of her correspondences are in the Library of the Society of Friends.

Her significant collection of books and journals, including on topics ranging from botany to Egyptology, were valued at £585.16. She had a collection of philological and antiquarian materials, particularly about Britain and Scandinavia. The scholarship included both outdated 18th-century works and more contemporary ones from both England and Europe. These included works by philologists Grimm, Bopp, Diefenbach, and Müller and antiquarians Hickes, Suhm, Lye and Manning, and Turner. She owned at least one Old Norse-Icelandic manuscript, an eighteenth-century copy of Víglundar saga, now in the University of Wisconsin-Madison Libraries Special Collections. She had also borrowed many books, being a member of the Norwich public and city libraries and the London Library.

Gurney additionally left an extensive fossil collection. The palaeontologist Richard Owen described it as "the most instructive in Norfolk", and Amelia Opie wrote that "Anna Gurney abounds in mammoth remains".

Anna also left a large bequest in her will toward the future of the Belfry School after her death.

== In fiction ==
Gurney's maritime rescue work has been celebrated multiple times in fiction, including from Joanna Baillie who wrote of her in her poem "Night Scene by the Sea", and Charlotte Mary Yonge who reprinted this poem in the Book of Golden Deeds, adding her own commentary. By both, Gurney is represented in a similar manner to Grace Darling, being depicted as courageous. Both stories also overstate her disability. Gurney also appears as a character in Emma Donoghue's short story "Salvage" (2002). In its narrative, Gurney and Sarah Buxton deal with a shipwreck, and she motivates her fellow townspeople to save two Russian sailors. Upon being saved, Gurney initially incorrectly translates the sailors' wishes as a want to save themselves, though eventually correctly translates them as wanting to salvage their lost possessions.

== Attribution ==
This article incorporates text from a publication now in the public domain: "Gurney, Anna". Dictionary of National Biography. London: Smith, Elder & Co. 1885–1900.
