= Idleness =

Inactive state, usually of a person or machine

Idle Woman, painting by Daniel Hernández Morillo

Idleness is a lack of motion or energy. In describing a person, idle suggests having no labor: "idly passing the day".

In physics, an idle machine exerts no transfer of energy. When a vehicle is not in motion, an idling engine does no useful thermodynamic work. In computing, an idle processor or network circuit is not being used by any program, application, or message.

== Cultural norms ==
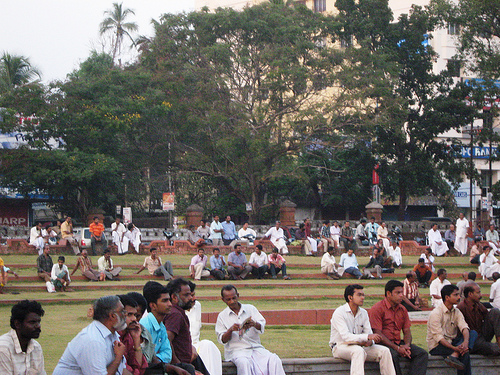
People idling in Kannur, India

Typically, when one describes a machine as idle, it is an objective statement regarding its current state. However, when used to describe a person, idle typically carries a negative connotation, with the assumption that the person is wasting their time by doing nothing of value.

Such a view is reflected in the proverb "an idle mind is the devil's workshop". Also, the popular phrase "killing time" refers to idleness and can be defined as spending time doing nothing in particular in order that time seems to pass more quickly. These interpretations of idleness are not universal – they are more typically associated with Western cultures. Idleness was considered a disorderly offence in England punishable as a summary offense.

== Analysis and interpretation ==
Philosopher Bertrand Russell published In Praise of Idleness and Other Essays in 1935, exploring the virtues of being idle in modern society.

Founded in 1993 by Tom Hodgkinson, the magazine The Idler is devoted to promoting the ethos of "idle living". Hodgkinson published How to Be Idle in 2005 (subsequently subtitled A Loafer's Manifesto in 2007), also aimed to improve the public perception of idling.

The Importance of Being Idle: A Little Book of Lazy Inspiration is a humorous self-help book published in August 2000. The book inspired the title of the 2005 chart-topping single by English rock band Oasis.

Mark Slouka published the essay "Quitting the Paint Factory: The Virtues of Idleness", hinting at a post-scarcity economy and linking conscious busyness with anti-democratic and fascist tendencies.

Idleness: A Philosophical Essay is a 2018 publication contending the idle state is one of true freedom.

== See also ==
- Inert
- Laziness
- Leisure
- Loitering
- Refusal of work
- Soldiering
- Slow movement (culture)
- Work (disambiguation)
