= Hudson Gurney =

English antiquary, verse-writer and politician

- Born: 19 January 1775; Keswick Old Hall, Norwich
- Died: 9 November 1864 (aged 89); Keswick Hall
- Relatives: Anna Gurney (sister)

Hudson Gurney (19 January 1775 – 9 November 1864) was an English antiquary and verse-writer, also known as a politician. He was a member of the Gurney family.

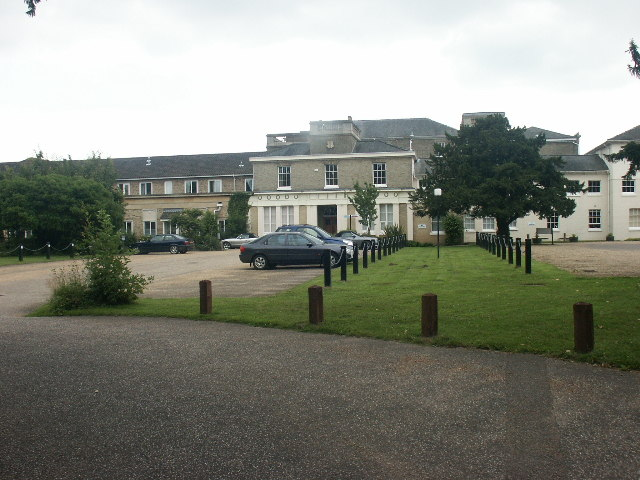
Keswick Hall. Built in 1817 and replacing The Old Hall where Hudson was born, and which still stands today. Keswick Hall was the residence of Hudson Gurney and many other members of the family

== Life ==
Gurney was born at Keswick Old Hall, Norwich on 19 January 1775, the eldest son of Richard Gurney of Keswick Hall, Norfolk, by his first wife, Agatha, daughter of David Barclay of Youngsbury, Hertfordshire; Anna Gurney was his sister. Hudson was born at what is now known as Keswick Old Hall, the original residence of the Norwich Gurney family. He was educated by his grandfather Barclay, by Thomas Young, and by John Hodgkin. He inherited a fortune from his father in 1811. In early life he travelled on the continent with his friend George Hamilton-Gordon, 4th Earl of Aberdeen.

Gurney was briefly M.P. for Shaftesbury from 1812 to 1813, the election being voided on petition. In March 1816, he was elected M.P. for Newtown, Isle of Wight, sitting in five successive parliaments until 1832. He served much on committees.

He was appointed High Sheriff of Norfolk for 1835–36. He was elected fellow of the Society of Antiquaries on 12 March 1818, and was vice-president from 1822 to 1846. He contributed to the society many hundreds of pounds for the publication of Anglo-Saxon works. He was also a Fellow of the Royal Society (elected 15 January 1818), a member of the British Archæological Association from 1843, vice-president of the Norfolk and Norwich Archæological Society and a supporter of the Norwich Museum and Literary Institute.

Gurney lived at Keswick Old Hall and in St. James's Square, London, where he saw much society till the last twenty years of his life, when he suffered from ill-health. In 1817 he felt he built Keswick Hall, re-naming the original house Old Hall. On 9 November 1864 he died at Keswick Hall, and was buried in Intwood churchyard, near Norwich. He was the head of the Norfolk family of the Gurneys, and his fortune was inherited mostly by John Henry Gurney.

Gurney is described as having a habit of questioning everything: "he seemed never to agree with you"; but he was kind, liberal, and hospitable. He married in 1809 Margaret (d. 1855), daughter of Robert Barclay, M.P., of Ury, Kincardineshire. They had no children. Gurney's portrait (when about 20) was painted by Opie, and also, about 1840, by Briggs.

== Works ==
His first publication was a privately printed English History and Chronology in Rhyme. In 1799 he published Cupid and Psyche, an imitation in verse of the Golden Ass of Apuleius (also 1800, 1801, and in Bohn's Classical Library, Apuleius). He also published Heads of Ancient History, (1814); Memoir of Thomas Young, M.D., (1831) Letter to Dawson Turner on Norwich and the Venta Icenorum (Norwich, 1847); and "Orlando Furioso" (1843), a verse translation, written in 1808, of parts of the poem. He also wrote for the Archæologia, mainly on English antiquities, in vols. xviii. (on the Bayeux Tapestry), xx–xxii. xxiv. xxv. and xxx. He purchased from the widow of Samuel Woodward all his manuscripts, drawings, and books on Norfolk topography, and printed for Mrs. Woodward's benefit the Norfolk Topographer's Manual and the History of Norwich Castle.

He possessed a library of from ten to fifteen thousand volumes, in every one of which he used to boast he had read. He left some diaries, which were not to be published for fifty years.

== Legacy ==
Between 1822 and 1830 he had presented to the British Museum Henry Jermyn's manuscript collections for the history of Suffolk; the seal of Ethelwald, bishop of Dunwich; and Roman tesselated pavements from Carthage.
