= Sarah-Maria Buxton =

- Born: 1789
- Died: 18 August 1839 (aged 49–50); Clifton, England
- Resting place: St. Martin's Church, Overstrand
- Occupations: Social reformer; abolitionist
- Family: Buxton family

Sarah-Maria Buxton (1789 – 18 August 1839) was a social reformer and abolitionist, long-term companion of Anna Gurney, scholar and philanthropist.

== Biography ==
Sarah-Maria Buxton was born in 1789, the daughter of Thomas-Fowell Buxton (1756-1793), Esquire of Earls Colne, Essex, and high-sheriff of that county, and Anna, eldest daughter of Osgood Hanbury, Esquire of the Grange, Coggeshall, Essex. She was the sister of Sir Thomas Fowell Buxton, 1st Baronet (1786–1845), a Member of Parliament, brewer, abolitionist and social reformer, who married the abolitionist Hannah Gurney, first cousin of Anna Gurney, scholar and philanthropist, who would later become Sarah-Maria Buxton's companion.

After Sarah-Maria's mother remarried to Reverend Henning, she went to reside at Northrepps with her cousin Anna Gurney, and the latter's mother. After Gurney's mother died in 1825, the two cousins moved to Northrepps Cottage and were henceforth known as the "Cottage ladies", and spoke of themselves as "partners". When Thomas Buxton's daughter, Priscilla, married, she decided not to work with him anymore, therefore Thomas Buxton enlisted the help and support of his sister Sarah-Maria and their cousin by marriage Anna. Much of the collection of papers presented by Thomas Buxton to the Colonial Office in support of the anti-slavery movement was done by Gurney and Buxton. Gurney's 1835 compendium on the Cape was "the most valuable and the only thing in use"; Which "might save a nation of 100,000 beings and several flourishing missions". The combined effort of Buxton, Sarah-Maria, Gurney, Priscilla Buxton and her husband Andrew Johnston, an MP and member of the Parliamentary Select Committee on Aboriginal Tribes, enabled the Buxtons to collect, collate and repackage large quantities of colonial information.

Buxton and Gurney entirely built the school at Overstrand and the Overstrand children constantly were taught in their house.

When Buxton died in 1839, Gurney continued to inhabit the cottage for the remainder of her life. When Gurney died in 1857, she was buried alongside Buxton in St. Martin's Church, Overstrand Church. Their tablet inscription reads: "To the beloved memory of Sarah Maria Buxton of Northrepps Cottage sister to Sir T. Powell Buxton Bart. who died (whilst on a journey) at Clifton August 18th 1839, aged 50 years and was buried in the adjacent vault. This tablet was inscribed by her sorrowing relative and partner Anna Gurney. Also of Anna Gurney. They were partners and chosen sisters knit together in the love of God and heirs together of eternal life through Christ Jesus."

== Legacy ==
George Richmond made a portrait of Sarah-Maria Buxton that is at Colne House, a pair to that of Anna Gurney.
