= Henry Jermyn =

Henry Jermyn may refer to:

- Henry Jermyn, 1st Earl of St Albans KG (c. 1604–1684), third son of Sir Thomas Jermyn and first Baron Jermyn of St Edmundsbury, Governor of Jersey
- Henry Jermyn, 1st Baron Dover (c. 1636–1708), nephew of the former, second son of (a later) Sir Thomas Jermyn and third and last Baron Jermyn of St Edmundsbury
- Henry Jermyn (antiquary) (1767–1820), English antiquarian
