= Stella Haverland Rouse =

American writer (1908–1999)

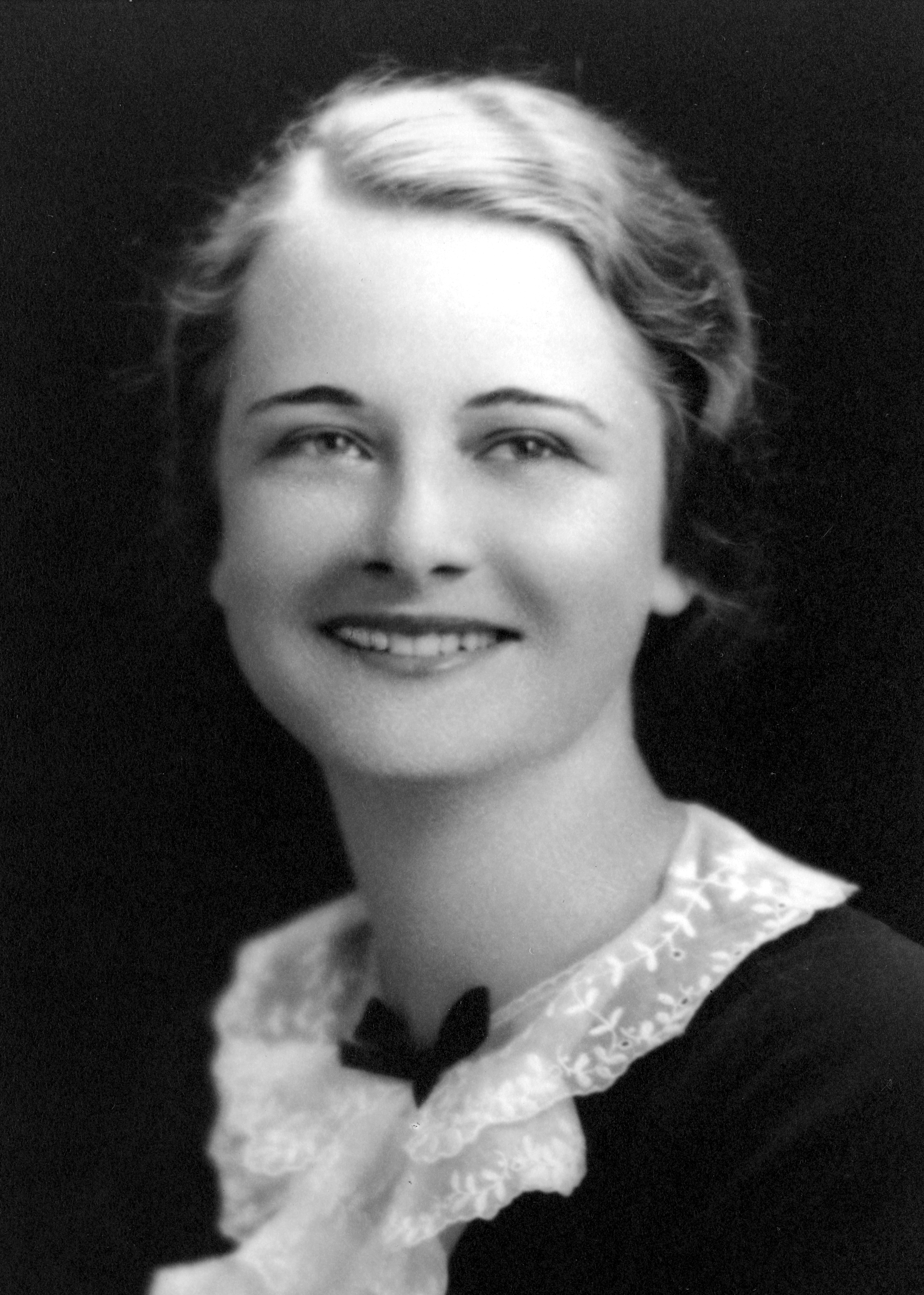
Stella Haverland Rouse, 1938

Stella Ella Haverland Rouse (April 14, 1908 – January 18, 1999) was a librarian, historian, author, and newspaper columnist in Santa Barbara, California. She wrote under her maiden name, Stella Haverland, and her married name, Stella Haverland Rouse.

== Early life and education ==
Haverland and her twin sister Della Haverland Huffstutler grew up on their father Albert Haverland's citrus ranch in the Goleta Valley. They attended the one-room Cathedral Oaks School near their home and graduated from Santa Barbara High School in 1925. After high school they studied for two years at the Santa Barbara Teachers College, earned their bachelor's degrees from the University of California at Los Angeles, and finished their educations at the Library School of the Los Angeles Public Library, graduating in 1931.

== Career ==
After returning to Santa Barbara in 1931, Haverland spent a decade as a staff librarian at the Santa Barbara Public Library. In 1942 she became the first librarian in charge of the new Santa Barbara County Medical Library housed at Cottage Hospital in Santa Barbara.

During their time as librarians in the 1930s and ‘40s Stella and Della wrote articles about various library topics for the Pacific Library Binding Company's Pacific Bindery Talk trade publication, including a series of biographical sketches of prominent librarians and authors. Two of the notable Santa Barbara residents Stella interviewed were German-born biographer Emil Ludwig, and Isobel Field, Robert Louis Stevenson's stepdaughter and literary assistant.

Haverland was frequently invited to provide book reviews at programs for women's organizations. Since she found no published guides for how to do so, she decided to write her own. Oral Book Reviewing was published by Meador Publishing Company of Boston in 1938.

When Della died in 1951, Haverland took over her daily Santa Barbara News-Press "Olden Days" column, compiling extracts of local news from 25, 50, and 75 years in the past. In 1962 she also began writing a Sunday feature previously written by local historian Walker A. Tompkins that focused on Santa Barbara history.

Over the next thirty years she produced about 1,500 weekly articles until her retirement from the News-Press in February 1991 at the age of 82. Her weekly articles are among the collections at the Gledhill Library at the Santa Barbara Historical Museum.

In 1974, Haverland published her book Santa Barbara's Spanish Renaissance and Old Spanish Days Fiesta about the history behind the Old Spanish Days Fiesta, an annual event that began in 1924. She wrote the book because she “wanted readers to put themselves back in time and know Santa Barbara ‘as it was.’” In 2012, Haverland's family arranged to have the book reprinted in time for that year's Fiesta.

From 1977 until 1987, Haverland also served as editor of the Santa Barbara Historical Society's quarterly journal, Noticias, and authored many articles for the publication at the same time.

Haverland was a member of the Business and Professional Women's club, and the American Association of University Women.

== Personal life ==
Haverland was married to Clarence Rouse on August 3, 1940. Clarence was a banker at County National Bank, later Crocker Bank. They had one daughter.

Haverland died in Santa Barbara on January 18, 1999.
