= Inerter =

Inerter may refer to:

- Inerting system, a device to increase the safety of a closed tank that contains highly flammable material
- Inerter, an element of mechanical network theory, known as a J-damper when implemented as a real device in the suspensions of Formula 1 racing cars

== See also ==
- Inert (disambiguation)
