= Daniel Hernández Morillo =

Peruvian painter

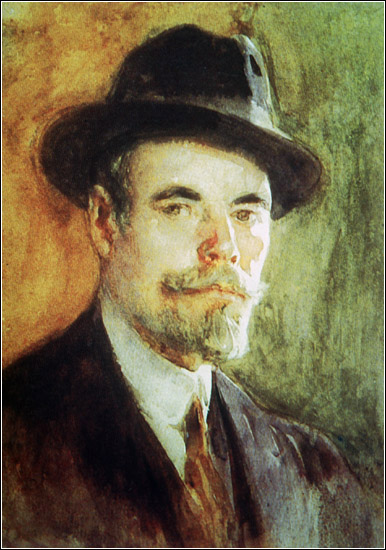
- Born: August 1, 1856; Salcabamba, Peru
- Died: October 23, 1932 (aged 76); Lima, Peru
- Education: Apprenticed to Leonardo Barbieri; further training in Rome (studied with and worked alongside Marià Fortuny); trained and worked in Paris
- Known for: Painting
- Notable work: "Death of Socrates" (1872)
- Style: Academic style
- Movement: Academic art
- Parent(s): Mother (Peruvian); Father (Spanish)
- Relatives: Inocencio Hernández Morillo (brother)
- Awards: Government grant from President Manuel Pardo (to study in Europe)
- Elected: President, Sociedad de Pintores Españoles (c.1883); Director, Escuela Nacional Superior Autónoma de Bellas Artes (1919–1932)
- Patrons: President Manuel Pardo (grant)
- Memorials: District near Pampas (named in his honour)

Daniel Hernández Morillo (1 August 1856, Salcabamba – 23 October 1932, Lima) was a Peruvian painter in the Academic style who spent most of his working life in Paris. He also served as the first Director of the Escuela Nacional de Bellas Artes.

== Biography ==
His mother was Peruvian and his father was from Spain. He was brought to Lima at the age of four and began his artistic education at fourteen, in the studios of Italian-born Leonardo Barbieri, who had worked as a portrait painter and daguerrotypist in California during the Gold Rush.

Later, when Barbieri had left Lima, Hernández took over his art classes. In 1872, he painted a version of the "Death of Socrates" that won him recognition from the government of President Manuel Pardo, and a grant that enabled him to study in Europe. He left Peru in 1874.

After his arrival in Paris, he met his fellow Peruvian, Ignacio Merino, who advised him to study in Rome instead. He did so, and remained there for nine years, working with Marià Fortuny, among others. In 1883, he returned to Paris and was elected President of the "Sociedad de Pintores Españoles", composed of the Spanish-speaking artists who lived there. He was also a member of the "Société des Artistes Français" and exhibited regularly at the Salon.

In 1912, he travelled to Montevideo, Buenos Aires and Rome to exhibit, returning to Paris in 1918. Not long after, his younger brother Inocencio obtained an important leadership position in the Dominican Order and, possibly through his influence, President José Pardo called upon Hernández to participate in the creation of a new art school. The "Escuela Nacional Superior Autónoma de Bellas Artes" opened in 1919, with Hernández as its first director. He retained that position until his death in 1932. A district encompassing the city of Pampas, near his birthplace, has been named after him.

== Gallery ==
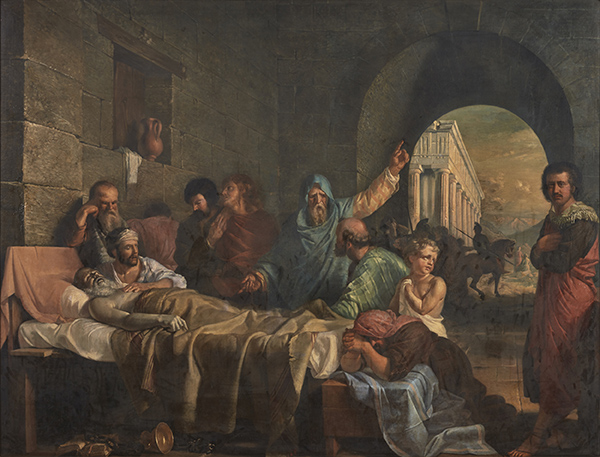
Death of Socrates

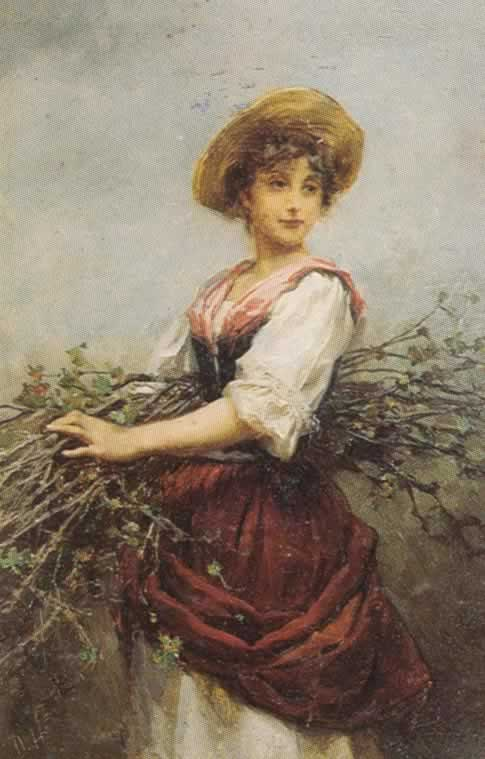
Woman Carrying Firewood

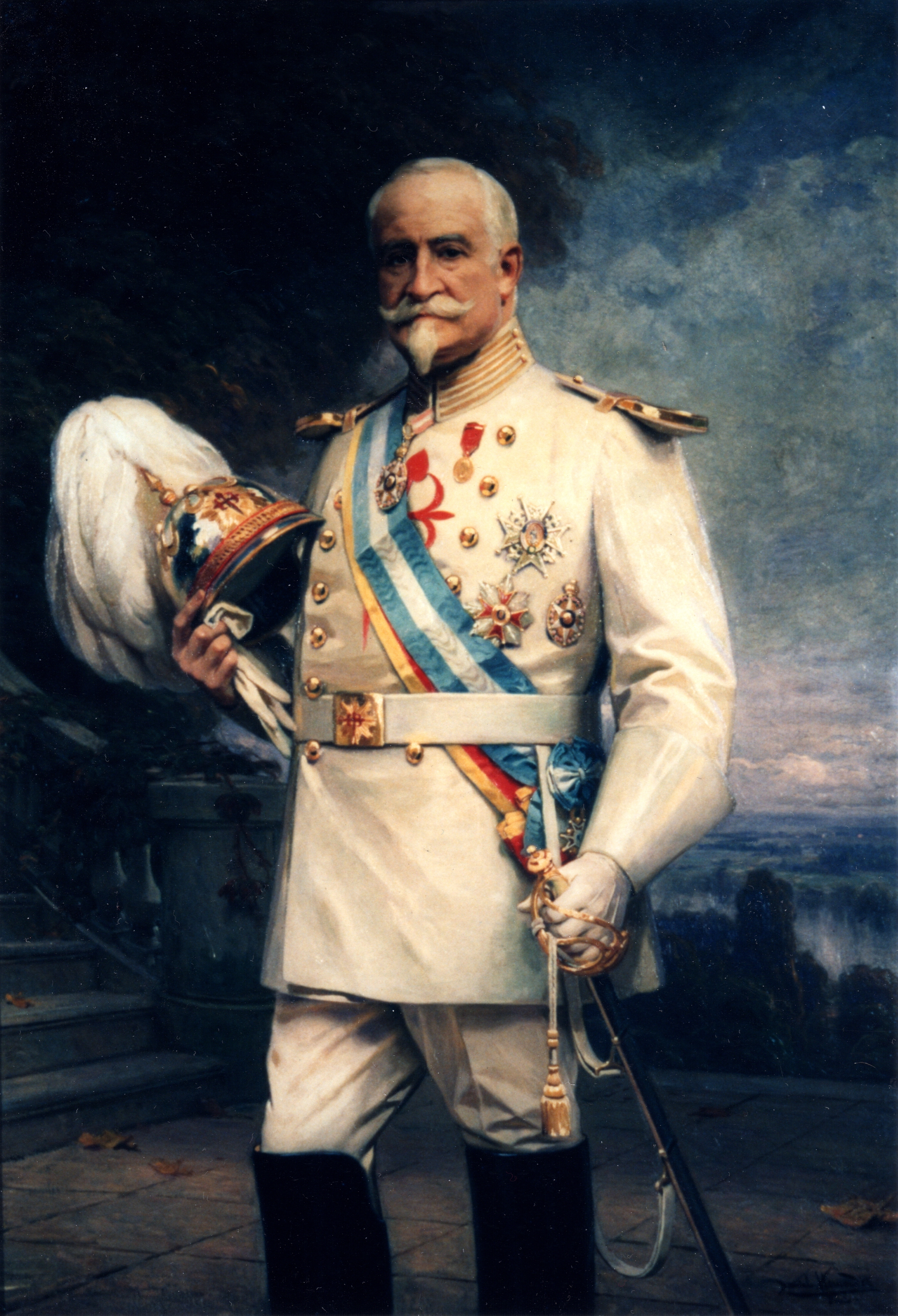
Juan Mariano de Goyeneche y Gamio

Francisco Pizzaro

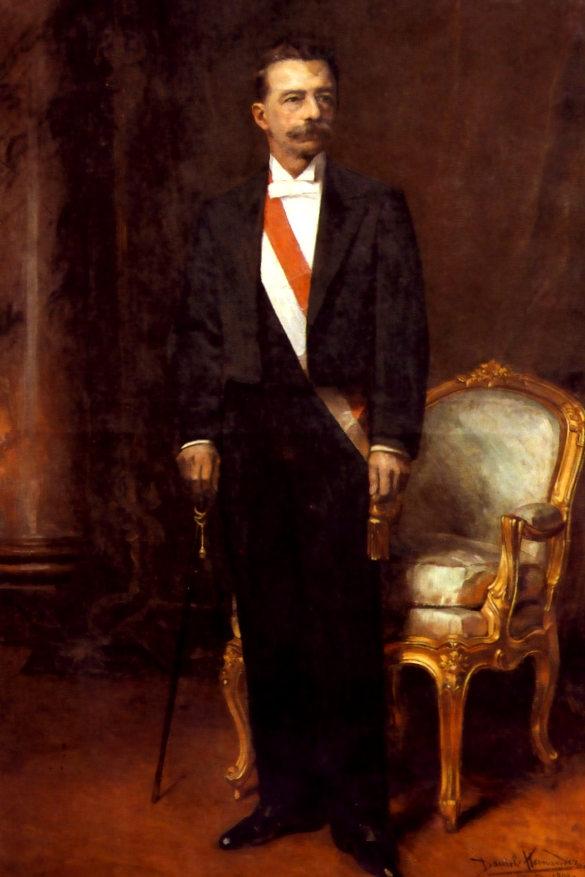
Eduardo López de Romaña

Idle Woman (La Perezosa) One of a popular series of similarly themed works.

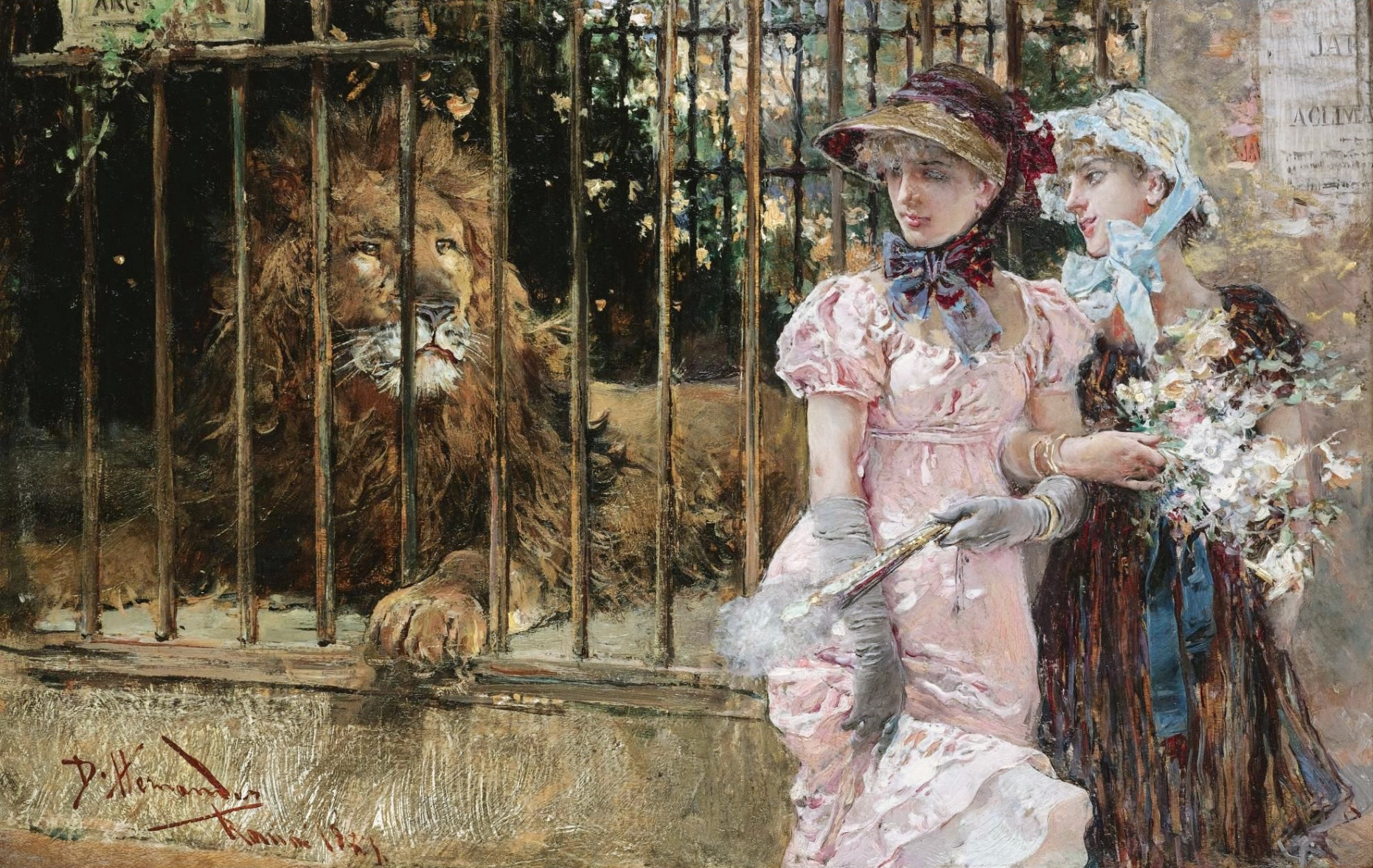
Girls at the Zoo

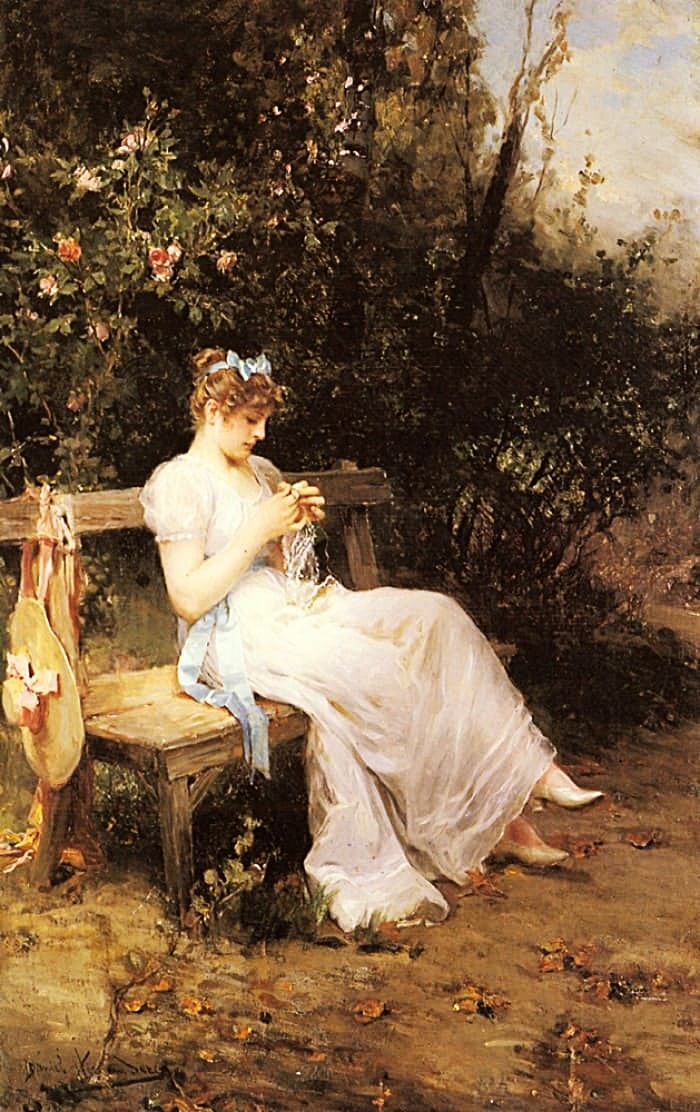
Leisure Moments
