= Gaston de Raousset-Boulbon =

19th-century French adventurer, filibuster and entrepreneur

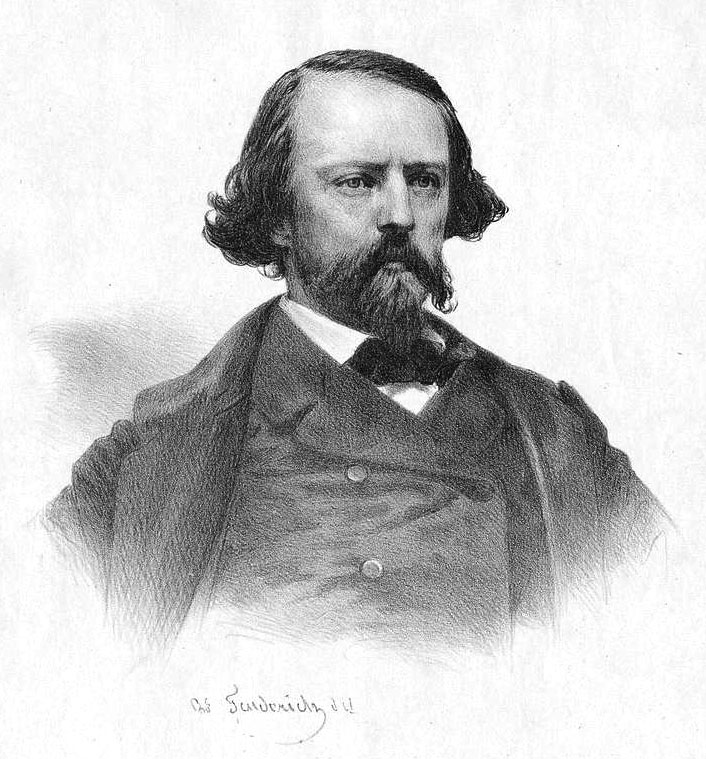
- Born: May 5, 1817; Avignon, Vaucluse, France
- Died: August 13, 1854 (aged 37); Guaymas, Sonora, Mexico
- Cause of death: Execution by firing squad
- Occupations: Adventurer, filibuster, businessman

Charles René Gaston Gustave de Raousset-Boulbon (May 5, 1817 – August 13, 1854) was a French adventurer, filibuster and entrepreneur and, by some accounts a pirate, and a theoretician of colonialism.

== Early life ==
Gaston de Raousset-Boulbon was born in Avignon, Vaucluse, Kingdom of France. He inherited the title of count.

== Career ==
In 1845, following the death of his father, Raousset-Boulbon moved to Algeria and served under the command of General Thomas Robert Bugeaud in the campaign in Kabylia. It was there where his first theories about colonialism were born; the French Revolution of 1848 killed his hopes of making a new fortune on Africa and he returned to Paris, where he failed to integrate into a society where aristocrats were fading and giving way to a new bourgeoisie.

Unable to survive in France, he boarded a ship sailing to the Americas as a third-class passenger, disembarking in a Colombian port. His impressions are typical of a 19th-century aristocrat: A letter to a friend describes Colombia as:

...the true America, the Spanish America. Ruins, mendicants, racial degradation, the haphazard mixture of all kins of blood, vagabonds playing guitar... naked children, little savages running everywhere amongst dogs... All of it in an admirable state of Nature.

The flag of Sonora created by Raousset in 1853 - modeled on the Flag of France rather than on any of Sonora's own political or social traditions.

Raousset-Boulbon arrived in San Francisco and felt deeply disillusioned after not receiving the treatment he thought was deserved for a Count.

After a series of failed enterprises as a gold prospector he became involved in a conflict in the Mexican state of Sonora.

=== Expeditions to Mexico ===
A group of mercenaries under the command of the Count Raousset-Boulbon sailed from the port of San Francisco, California, attempting two separate filibuster expeditions, in 1852 and 1854, against the government of Sonora, Mexico. During this time he became a close friend of the painter Leonardo Barbieri, with whom he eventually accompanied from California to Mexico City.

The main objective of the invaders was to attain independence for the State of Sonora, forming a new country separate from Mexico, following the example of Texas, which had achieved its independence in 1836. Raousset-Boulbon wanted Sonora to be ruled by the François d'Orléans, Prince of Joinville, whom he befriended.

The first expedition was under the guise of a mining company known as La Compania Restauradora de la Mina de la Arizona. Raousset-Boulbon and his forces captured Hermosillo, Sonora, the capital of the state, in 1852. A retreat to Guaymas resulted in his surrender to General Miguel Blanco. In 1854 Raousset-Boulbon returned to Sonora, but his forces did not get the popular support they needed. They were defeated in Guaymas by a small army led by Jose Maria Yanez, in the Battle of Guaymas, on July 13, 1854.

== Death ==
On August 13, 1854, the Count Raousset-Boulbon was executed by a firing squad in Guaymas, Sonora, Mexico. He refused to wear a blindfold. Don José Márquez, an eye-witness to the execution, stated that Raousset-Boulbon's remains were buried in Guaymas until 1866, when, while Mexico was under the rule of Maximilian, they were exhumed by French naval officers and taken to France for final burial.

== See also ==
- Filibuster (military)
- William Walker (filibuster)
- List of French possessions and colonies

== Sources ==
- Condal, Pablo. (1977). El Conde de Sonora. Todo es historia, El ayer de los hechos de hoy. Año II., Núm. 18. Marzo de 1977. México D.F.: Grupo Editorial, S. A. Cd. Satélite.
- de Collet La Madelène, Joseph Henri. (1876). Le comte Gaston de Raousset-Boulbon, sa vie et ses aventures: d'pres ses papiers et sa correspondance. Paris: Charpentier et Cie, Libraires Éditeurs.
- de Lachapelle, André [Raousset de Boulbon]. (1859). El Conde De Raousset-Boulbon Y La Expedición De Sonora: Correspondencia, recuerdos y obras inéditas, publicadas por André de Lachapelle, exredactor en jefe del Messager de San Francisco, etc., etc. (Carlos Mal, Trans.). París: Impreso en Bonaventure et Successois, Quai des Augustins, 55. (Biography in Spanish, with letters and poems written by the Earl of Raousset.)
- Dyssord, Jacques. (1943). Un conquistador moderne : Le comte de Raousset-Boulbon. Paris: Éditions Sorlot.
- Glantz, Margo (Ed.). (1973). Un folletín realizado: La aventura del conde de Raousset-Boulbon. México, D.F.: Secretaría de Educación Pública, Dirección General de Educación Audiovisual y Divulgación.
