= Keswick, South Norfolk =

Village in Norfolk, England

Coordinates: 52.593°N 1.266°E

Keswick
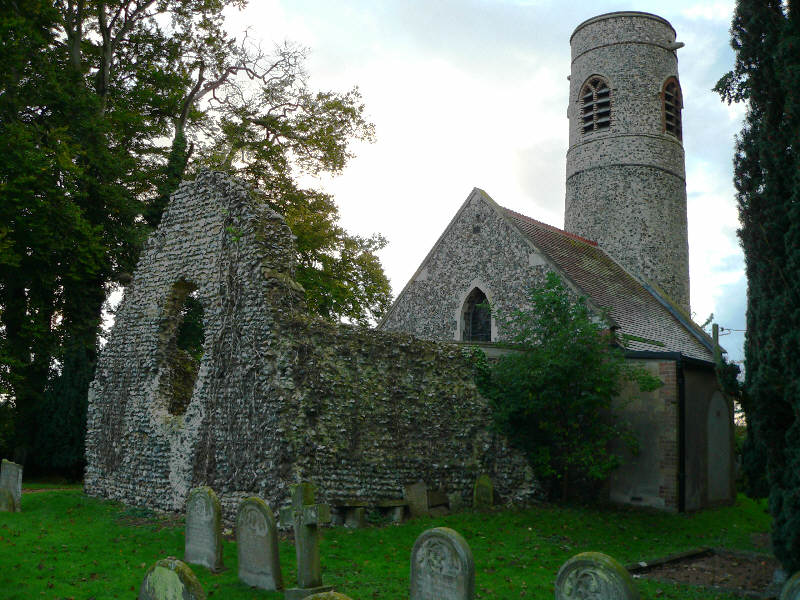
- All Saints' Church

- Location within Norfolk
- OS grid reference: TG212044
- Civil parish: Keswick and Intwood
- District: South Norfolk
- Shire county: Norfolk
- Region: East
- Country: England
- Sovereign state: United Kingdom
- Post town: NORWICH
- Postcode district: NR4
- Dialling code: 01603
- Police: Norfolk
- Fire: Norfolk
- Ambulance: East of England
- UK Parliament: South Norfolk

Keswick (/ˈkɛzɪk/) is a village and former civil parish, now in the parish of Keswick and Intwood, in the South Norfolk district, in the English county of Norfolk.

Keswick is located 6.5 miles (10.5 km) east of Wymondham and 2.4 miles (3.9 km) south-west of Norwich.

== Etymology ==
Keswick's name is of Anglo-Saxon origin and derives from the Old English for the farm specialising in cheese.

== History ==
In the Domesday Book, Keswick is listed as a settlement of 38 households in the hundred of Humbleyard. In 1086, the village was divided between the East Anglian estates of Roger Bigod and Godric the Steward.

A watermill has been recorded in Keswick since the time of the Norman Conquest, along the River Yare. The current building was built in the 19th century and has now been converted into private residences.

All Saints' Church, Keswick is a short distance away from the main section of the village, accessed via a remote lane off the B113.

== Keswick Hall ==
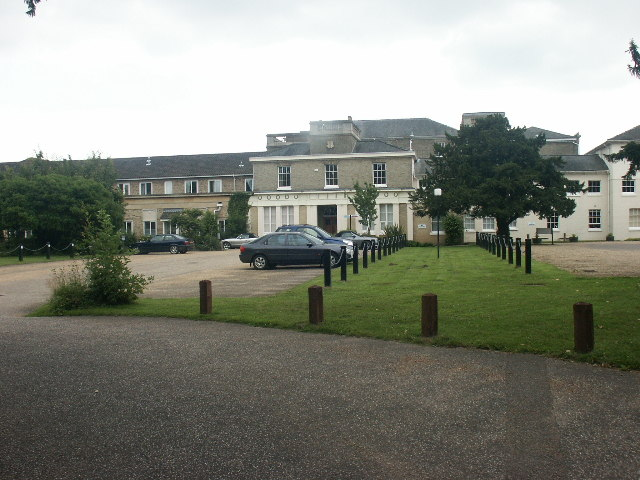
Keswick Hall

Keswick Hall was built in 1817 by William Wilkins in the Regency style using gault brickwork for the Gurney family, and extended in 1839.

The hall was requisitioned during the Second World War and was later used as a teacher training college, Norwich Training College. The building was sold during the 1980s and converted into flats. It was Grade II listed in 1987.

There was also an older building, Keswick Old Hall, dating from the early 17th century. This was extended around 1800. The building was demolished in the 1960s, but there are still 18th-century cellars.

== All Saints' Church ==
Keswick's church is one of Norfolk's 124 remaining round-tower churches, dating from the Twelfth Century. All Saints' is located close to Low Road and, like Keswick Hall, has been Grade II listed since 1987. The church stands alongside the B113 in an elevated position, overlooking nearby farmland and Keswick Village.

All Saint's Church is widely-thought to be one of East Anglia's smallest churches alongside the similarly-named All Saints' Church in Santon Downham. However, the church in Santon has been unused since the late 1990s, making All Saints' Keswick the smallest church still used by Norfolk's parishioners today.

The church itself fell into disuse during the 1500s and was largely demolished in 1597, leaving just a few walls and the round tower still standing. In the late 1800s, a restoration of the church site took place and a newer mortuary chapel was constructed by the well-known Gurney Family. Today, the newer chapel sits alongside the atmospheric ruins of the original church building. The church is open once a month for a Sunday service.

All Saints' holds a stained-glass window designed by William Morris in the 1950s, depicting Saint Hope.

According to widely repeated local folklore, a circular copse of trees visible in the field overlooked by the church to the south-west is said to conceal a plague pit, however no credible historical accounts are available to verify this claim.

== Notable residents ==
- General Richard Dannatt, Baron Dannatt (b.1950), senior British Army officer, Chief of the General Staff (2006–2009).
- Sir Thomas Gresham (1519–1579), merchant and financier, link to Keswick unknown.
- Hudson Gurney (1775–1864), antiquary and politician, lived in Keswick.
- Anna Gurney (1795–1857), geologist and philanthropist, lived and died in Keswick.
- Darren Huckerby (b.1976), Coventry City and Norwich City footballer, lives in Keswick.
- Jake Humphrey (b.1978), television presenter, grew up in Keswick.

== Governance ==
Keswick is part of the electoral ward of Cringleford for local elections and is part of the district of South Norfolk.

The village's national constituency is South Norfolk, which has been represented by the Labour's Ben Goldsborough MP since 2024.

On 1 April 1935 the parish of Intwood was merged with Keswick, on 7 July 2007 the parish was renamed "Keswick and Intwood". In 1931 the parish of Keswick (prior to the merge) had a population of 127.

== War Memorial ==
Keswick's war memorial is a marble plaque affixed to the exterior of All Saints' Church which lists the following names for the First World War:

Rank	Name	Unit	Date of death	Burial/Commemoration
Sjt.	Edward V. Edwards	9th Bn., Norfolk Regiment	7 May 1918	All Saints' Churchyard
Gnr.	William R. Gooch	5th Bty., Royal Garrison Artillery	21 Nov. 1916	Karasouli War Cemetery
Pte.	Alfred G. Bailey	13th Bn., Royal Fusiliers	15 Nov. 1916	Thiepval Memorial
Pte.	Edgar H. Larwood	7th Bn., Norfolk Regiment	1 Nov. 1918	Norwich Cemetery
Pte.	William H. Evenden	8th Bn., Norfolk Regt.	21 Oct. 1916	Thiepval Memorial
Pte.	James B. Edwards	7th Bn., Suffolk Regiment	8 Apr. 1918	All Saints' Churchyard
Pte.	George E. Brock	8th Bn., York and Lancaster Regiment	12 Oct. 1917	Tyne Cot
Rfn.	William G. A. Ashfield	16th Bn., King's Royal Rifle Corps	12 Oct. 1918	Vis-en-Artois Memorial

The following names were added after the Second World War:

Rank	Name	Unit	Date of death	Burial/Commemoration
Capt.	James E. D. Lowe	2nd Bn., Royal Norfolk Regiment	9 Feb. 1945	Taukkyan War Cemetery
Gnr.	Leonard L. Bumfrey	65 AT Regt., Royal Artillery	1 Jun. 1940	Dunkirk Town Cemetery
