= Ernest de Saisset =

American painter (1864–1899)

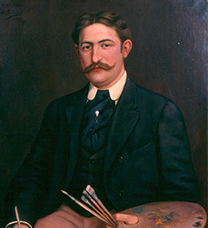
- Self-portrait (c.1895)
- Born: Ernest Pierre de Saisset; 1864; San Jose, California, U.S.
- Died: 1899 (aged 34–35); San Jose, California, U.S.
- Education: Santa Clara University, Académie Julian
- Known for: Painting

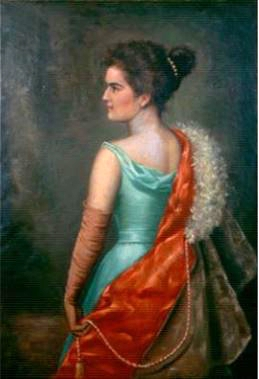
Portrait of his sister, Isabel

Ernest Pierre de Saisset (1864 – 1899) was an American painter, he is best known for landscapes, portraits and nudes. The De Saisset Museum in Santa Clara is named after him.

== Biography ==
Ernest de Saisset was born in 1864 in San Jose, California. His father, Pedro de Alcântara Brasileiro de Saisset (1829–1902), was the illegitimate son of Pedro I & IV, King of Portugal and Emperor of Brazil. Upon immigrating to California to take advantage of the Gold Rush, becoming a businessman and French consular agent; later serving as Vice-Consul. Years later, he helped incorporate and served as President of the Brush Electric Light Company branch in San Jose. Ernest's mother, Maria de Jesus (Jesusita) Palomares (1832–1907), was the widow of Jose Suñol (a son of Don Antonio Suñol) and had owned a large ranch. Palomares had three daughters from her prior marriage, Maria "Lola" Dolores A. Suñol (1851–1910), Narcisia Meleton Suñol (1853–1894) and Maria Josefa Brigida Suñol (1854–1906). Together Pedro de Saisset and Maria Palomares had four children together: Henrietta, Ernest, Pierre, and Isabel (1876–1950).

Ernest attended classes at Santa Clara College starting at age 16. While there, he took classes in French, elocution, calligraphy and design, and received an award in 1883 for an oil painting. During the final year of his studies, Ernest studied painting with Fr. Bartholomew Tortone, who approved of his work. Since art instructors were in short supply in pioneer California, the de Saisset family sent Ernest to Paris for further study in art at Académie Julian. With the assistance of an uncle who lived there, he was able to find a studio near the Académie. He stayed in Paris for nine years altogether, studying with Jules Lefebvre, Jean-Joseph Benjamin-Constant and William Bouguereau, among others. At one point, he tried to set up an exhibit at the Salon, but was discouraged by what he felt was favoritism for native-born French people.

In 1895, he returned to California; painting nudes, landscapes and numerous portraits. He died only a few years later in 1899, at the age of thirty-five, of what was diagnosed as "rheumatism".

His sister Isabel de Saisset, who died in 1950, bequeathed a large sum for the establishment of an art museum, to be named in his honor, at Santa Clara University. The De Saisset Museum was dedicated in 1955, and contains most of his extant paintings.
