= De Saisset Museum =

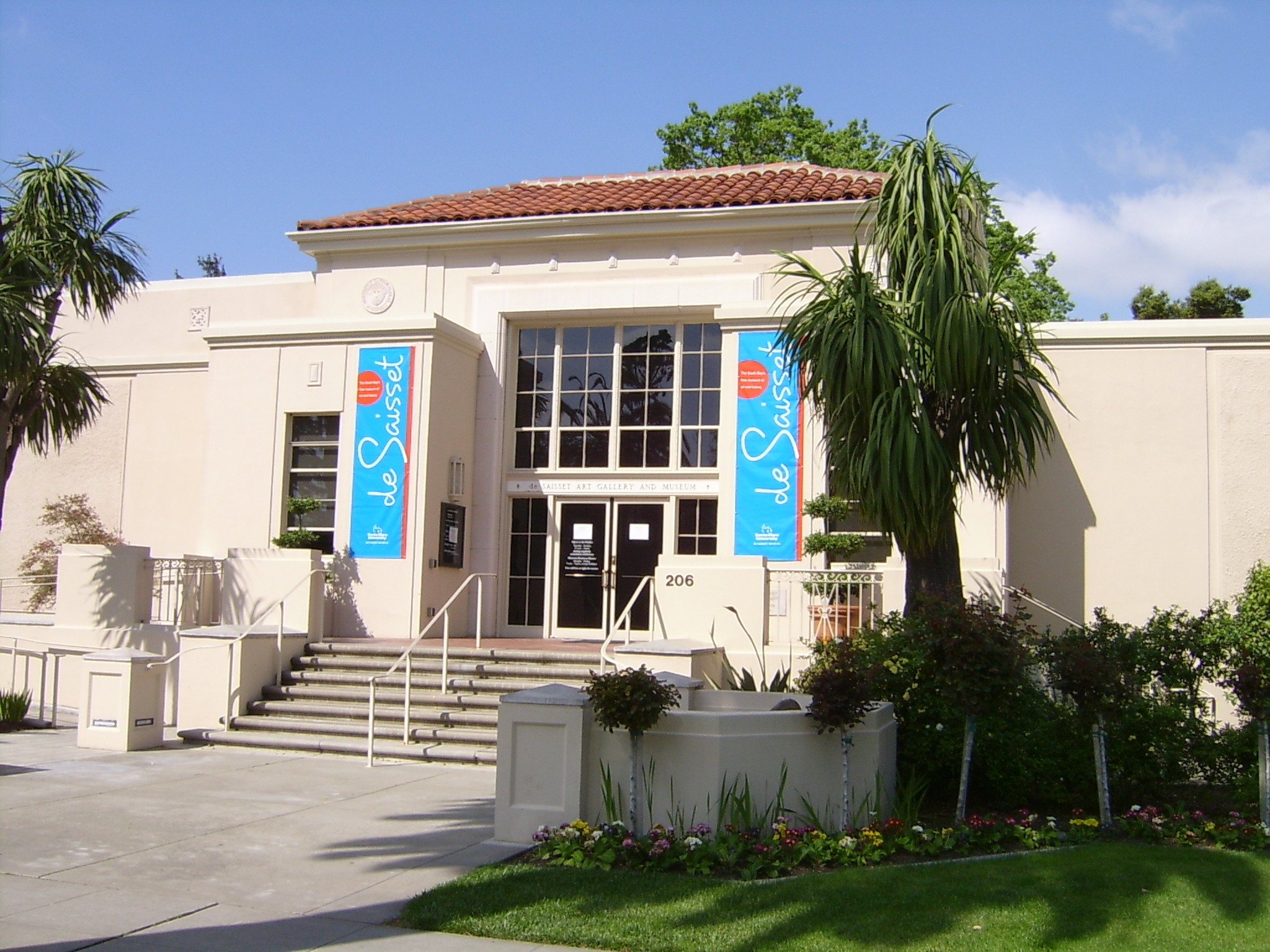
- Established: 1955
- Location: Santa Clara, California, U.S.
- Coordinates: 37.35230°N 121.93819°W
- Type: Art museum
- Accreditation: American Association of Museums
- Founder: Isabel de Saisset

The de Saisset Museum at Santa Clara University opened in 1955, after Isabel de Saisset, the last member of a California pioneer family bequeathed her estate to the University of Santa Clara. The museum owns nearly 10,000 art pieces and historical artifacts, including the work of early Californian artist and university alumnus Ernest de Saisset and a considerable collection of California mission artifacts. The de Saisset recently completed a major renovation of its storage facilities and is open to the public free of charge.

== About the museum ==
The 19,210-square-foot (1,785 m^{2}) building is located in front of Mission Santa Clara de Asís and has been a part of the university campus since 1955. It is one of only two museums in the San Jose area accredited by the American Alliance of Museums.

The museum is housed in a three level building that conforms with the Mission Style prevalent on the Santa Clara campus and bears the de Saisset family crest above the foyer door. The ground floor holds a foyer, several rooms for visiting exhibits, and a large lecture hall for presentations and activities. The upstairs includes room for exhibits from the permanent collection and a bathroom, and the basement displays historical artifacts, artwork from the permanent collection, and houses viewing drawers for many of the European prints.

== History ==
=== de Saisset family ===
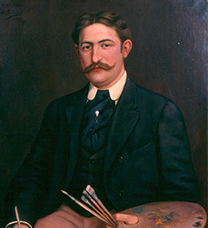
Ernest de Saisset, self-portrait from circa 1895.

Pedro de Alcântara Brasileiro de Saisset was born in Paris, France, the illegitimate son of Pedro I & IV, King of Portugal and Emperor of Brazil, and his mistress Henrietta Josephine Mees Saisset. He emigrated from France near the time of the gold rush intending to capitalize on the newfound wealth in the region. While in the area, he served as a consular representative in San Jose and founded the Brush Electric Light company in San Jose, California. While in San Jose, de Saisset married with Maria de Jesus (Jesusita) Palomares (1832–1907) and had four children together: Henrietta, Ernest, Pierre, and Isabel.

Of these children, Henrietta was the only one to marry, and none of the siblings had any children of their own. Ernest was the oldest of the children and began his education at Santa Clara College when he was sixteen. He continued as a student for three years, showing potential in French and drawing. During the final year of his studies, Ernest studied painting with Fr. Bartholomew Tortone, who approved of his work. Since art instructors were in short supply in pioneer California, the de Saisset family sent Ernest to Paris for further study in art at Académie Julian. In 1895, he returned to California; however, he died four years later in 1899.

=== Museum history ===
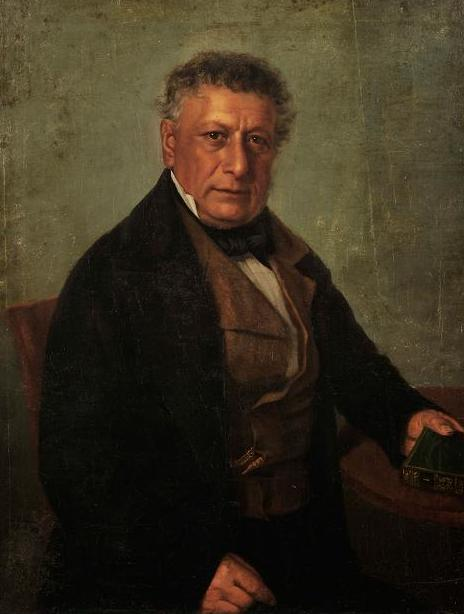
Portrait of Don Francisco Pérez Pacheco; oil on canvas by Leonardo Barbieri, 1852.

Before her death in 1950, Isabel de Saisset informed the president and governing board of the University of Santa Clara of her wish to donate family real estate and the family art collection for the purpose of constructing a gallery and museum. Many of her personal items—jewels, silver, and tapestries—were also donated. Since that time, the museum has expanded its collections to include many objects from the United States and abroad.

The museum was opened in 1955.

"Highlights of the de Saisset’s permanent collection include Renaissance, Baroque, Rococo, and 19th century prints by artists such as Albrecht Dürer, William Hogarth, and Giovanni Battista Piranesi. Modernist prints in the de Saisset Collection include works by Marc Chagall, Henri Matisse, and Pablo Picasso." The museum also houses important collections of contemporary prints and photographs.

== See also ==
- Triton Museum of Art
