= La Perezosa =

Painting by Daniel Hernández Morillo

Idle Woman
- Artist: Daniel Hernández Morillo
- Year: 1906
- Medium: Oil on canvas
- Dimensions: 70 cm × 105 cm (28 in × 41 in)
- Location: Lima, Peru
- Owner: Museo de Arte de Lima

La Perezosa (English: Idle Woman) is a genre painting completed in oil on canvas by Peruvian painter Daniel Hernández Morillo in Lima, Peru.

== Background and creation ==
Daniel Hernández Morillo, a Peruvian student of itinerant Italian painter Leonardo Barbieri, left his homeland for Europe in 1874. Although Europe was in the midst of an artistic renewal, Morillo remained influenced by the academic art movement and French rococo painting. This is reflected in the pastel tones and the lightness of Idle Woman, which was completed in 1906.

== Provenance ==
The painting is currently held by the Museo de Arte de Lima, in Lima, Peru.
