= José María Yáñez =

19th-century Mexican military leader and war hero

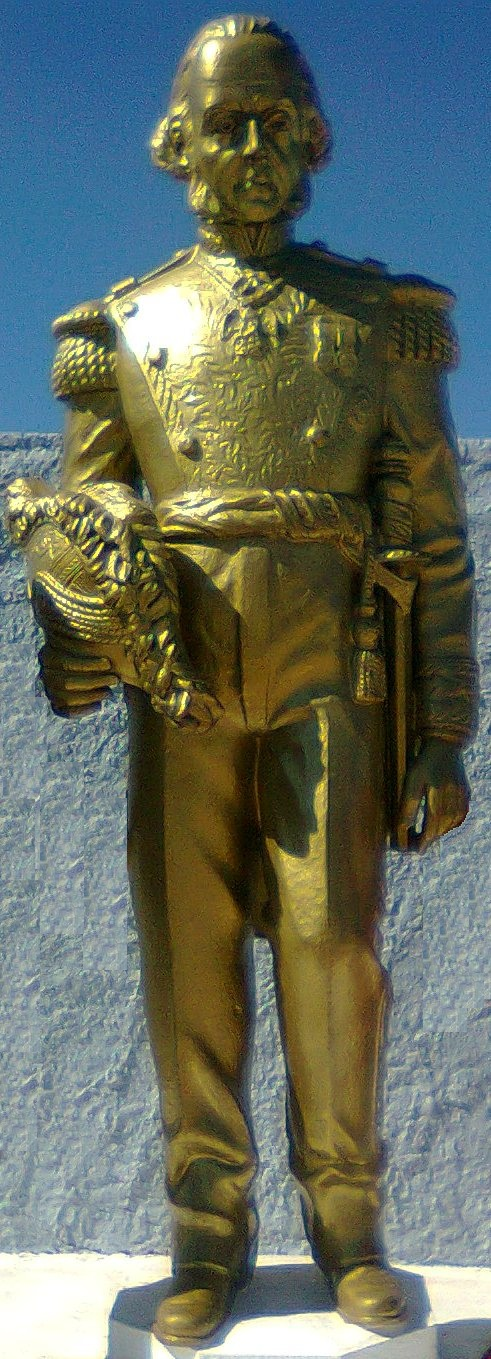
- Statue of Jose Maria Yañez.
- Born: c. 1803; Valle de Santiago, Guanajuato, Mexico
- Died: August 10, 1880 (aged 76–77); Mexico City, Mexico
- Occupation: General

General José María Yáñez Carrillo (1803 – August 10, 1880) was a Mexican soldier who fought in the Mexican War of Independence. He also served in the Mexican-American war and the war against the French attempt to create an empire in Mexico.

== Biography ==
He was born to peasants in Valle de Santiago, Guanajuato, and ran away from home as a child to see other lands and customs of the people. At the age of 18, he joined the Ejército Trigarante to fight for the Independence of Mexico where he was promoted, and had his best performance in the defense of Tampico against an expedition eight years after the independence was consummated.

In 1838, he contributed to the successful defense of Veracruz against French invaders when they attacked during the Pastry War. On May 20, 1846, he revolted against President Mariano Paredes y Arrillaga, who was a conservative trying to turn the republic into a monarchy. As a general in Jalisco, commanding an army of 500 men and six artillery pieces, he attacked the invading U.S. Army, which had arrived through the San Blas port, forcing the Americans to retreat.

In 1852, he was designated governor of Jalisco, by the conservatives who supported, with José María Blancarte, the Hospice Plan.

In November 1853 he commanded the forces that defeated William Walker and filibusters who tried to seize Baja California and Sonora to create an independent republic.

One of the most notable military facts about Yáñez, was the defense of Guaymas. He was designated governor of Sonora on April 19, 1854, and, on July 13 of the same year, he defended the state against an army under the command of Count Gaston de Raousset-Boulbon. In that month, the state of Sonora was invaded by 400 filibusters from France, Germany and Chile, under the command of Boulbon who was trying to seize the Mexican state and found an independent country. Count Boulbon had tried to convince Yáñez to give up Guaymas without resistance and, after his refusal, attacked the port on July 13. Neighboring Mexican states joined the army commanded by Yañez and Boulbon was arrested and executed on August 13. President Santa Anna criticized Yáñez out of apparent jealousy for his courage but, after his administration ended, Yáñez was declared "Benefactor (Benemérito) of Sonora and Jalisco". He was later designated governor of Sinaloa and, as such, he accepted the Tacubaya Plan. Few days later he resigned, leaving Pedro Espejo as governor of Sinaloa, and traveled to Mexico City.

He died, as a Minister of War and the Navy, in Mexico City.

Guaymas Airport is named after him.
