= Leonardo Barbieri =

Italian painter

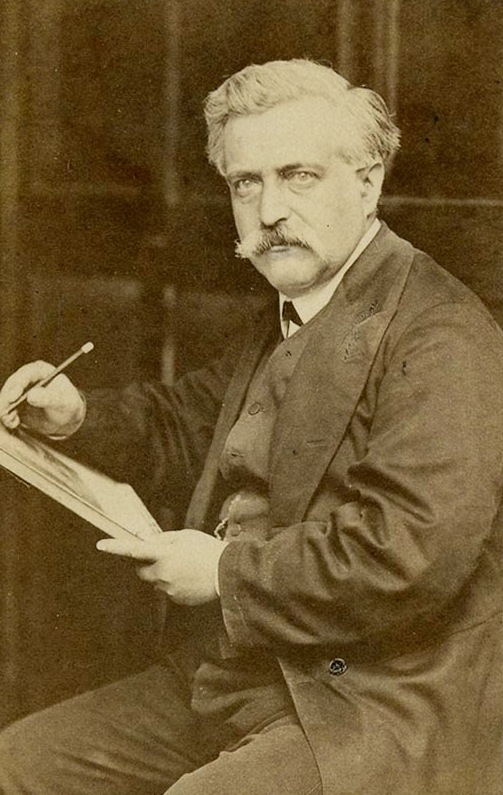
- Born: c. 1818; Savoy, Italy
- Died: 1896; Savoy, Italy
- Occupations: Portraitist, daguerrotypist

Leonardo Barbieri (1818–1896) was an Italian painter, who was active in the Americas in from 1840s to the 1860s. He is famous for his numerous portraits of Californios, produced between 1849 and 1853, considered to be California's most important collection of portraits from the 19th century, earning him the epithet as "California's Leonardo".

== Life ==
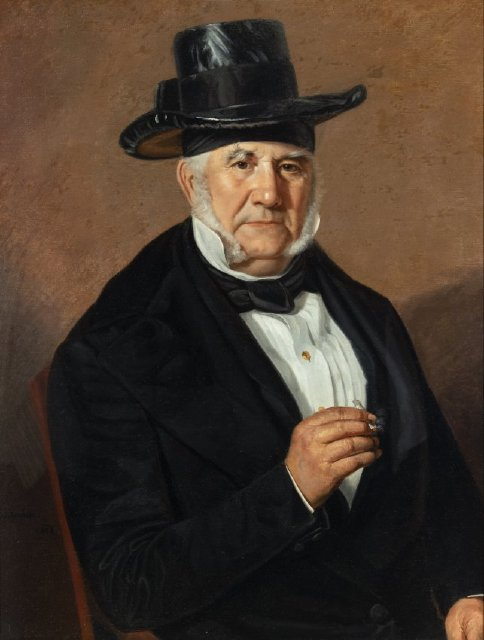
Portrait of Carlos Antonio Carrillo, 1852; Santa Barbara Historical Museum.

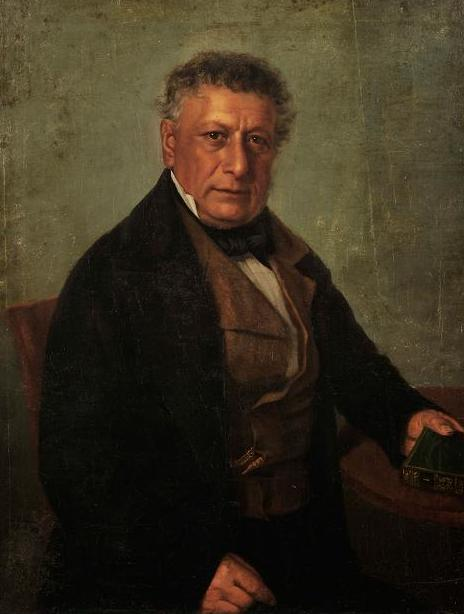
Portrait of Francisco Pérez Pacheco, 1852; De Saisset Museum of Santa Clara University.

Barbieri was born in 1818 in the Duchy of Savoy, Kingdom of Sardinia. He was educated in Lyon.

=== Argentina and Bolivia ===
Barbieri emigrated to the Americas in 1844, to Buenos Aires in Argentina, where he became a portraitist. He subsequently taught drawing in La Paz, Bolivia.

=== California ===
By 1849, he had opened a studio in San Francisco, followed by Santa Barbara in 1850 and 1852, and Monterey in 1852. Barbieri is famed for his numerous portraits of Californios, including:

- Don Guillermo Castro; 1852. Held by the Hayward Area Historical Society
- Don José de la Guerra y Noriega; 1850. Held by the Santa Barbara Historical Museum
- Don Carlos Antonio Carrillo; 1852. Held by the Santa Barbara Historical Museum
- Doña Ramona de los Ángeles Lorenzana; 1852. Held by the Santa Barbara Historical Museum
- Padre José González Rubio; 1850. Held by Mission Santa Barbara
- Don Francisco Pérez Pacheco; 1852. Held by the De Saisset Museum at Santa Clara University
- Doña Feliciana Estada Pacheco; 1852. Held by the De Saisset Museum at Santa Clara University
- Doña María Pacheco Malarín; 1852. Held by the De Saisset Museum at Santa Clara University

=== Mexico ===
In July 1853, he accompanied Count Gaston de Raousset-Boulbon in a steamship from California down to Acapulco and then overland to Mexico City, during which he became a close friend of Raousset-Boulbon.

=== Peru ===
He was a portrait painter and daguerrotypist in Lima, Peru in 1861-1863, He opened an art school, and his students included Peruvian painters Federico del Campo and Daniel Hernández Morillo.

=== Later life ===
Barbieri returned to Europe in 1871. He died in his home village in Savoy in 1896.

== Legacy ==
Although his tenure in California was brief, his oeuvre is considered to be the most important collection of portraiture of 19th century California, during a historically crucial period of its transition from Mexican to American rule.

The largest collections of his works make up part of the permanent collections at the De Saisset Museum of Santa Clara University and the Santa Barbara Historical Museum.
