= Intwood =

Village in Norfolk, England

Coordinates: 52.591°N 1.242°E

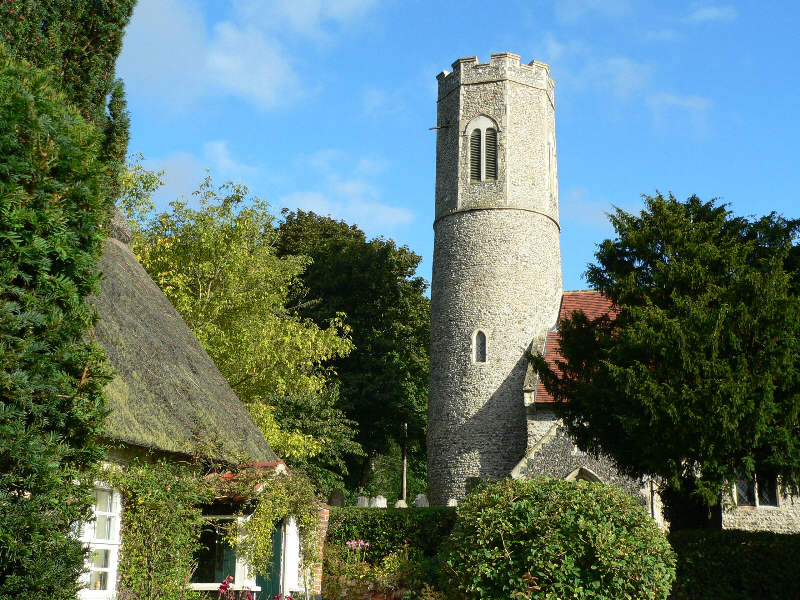
- All Saints' Church

- Location within Norfolk
- OS grid reference: TG197042
- Civil parish: Keswick and Intwood
- District: South Norfolk
- Shire county: Norfolk
- Region: East
- Country: England
- Sovereign state: United Kingdom
- Post town: NORWICH
- Postcode district: NR4
- Dialling code: 01603
- UK Parliament: South Norfolk

Intwood is a village and former civil parish, now in the parish of Keswick and Intwood, in the South Norfolk district, in the English county of Norfolk.

Intwood is located 5.5 miles (8.9 km) north-east of Wymondham and 3 miles (4.8 km) south-west of Norwich.

== History ==
Hethel's name is of Anglo-Saxon origin and derives from the Old English for Inta's wood.

In the Domesday Book, Hethel is listed as a settlement of 18 households in the hundred of Humbleyard. In 1086, the village part of the estates of Eudo the Steward.

Intwood Hall was previously a medieval manor which entertained Queen Elizabeth I during a royal progress. The present building was built in the mid-Nineteenth Century for the Unthank family.

On 1 April 1935 the parish was abolished and merged with Keswick.

== Geography ==
In 1931 the parish had a population of 54, this was the last time separate population statistics were collected for Intwood as in 1935 the parish was merged.

== All Saints' Churchyard ==
All Saints' Church dates from the Twelfth Century and is one of Norfolk's 124 remaining round-tower churches. All Saints' is located on Intwood Road and has been Grade II listed since 1959. The church holds Sunday service once a month.

All Saints' was restored in the Victorian era and features poppy-headed benches dating from the 1850s. The church also features a stained-glass window depicting a set of angels designed by Heaton, Butler and Bayne as well as a memorial to Lieutenant Clement W. O. Unthank who died in Lucknow in 1900 after falling during a game of polo.

== Governance ==
Intwood is part of the electoral ward of Cringleford for local elections and is part of the district of South Norfolk.

The village's national constituency is South Norfolk which has been represented by the Labour's Ben Goldsborough MP since 2024.
