= Santa Barbara Historical Museum =

Museum in California, United States

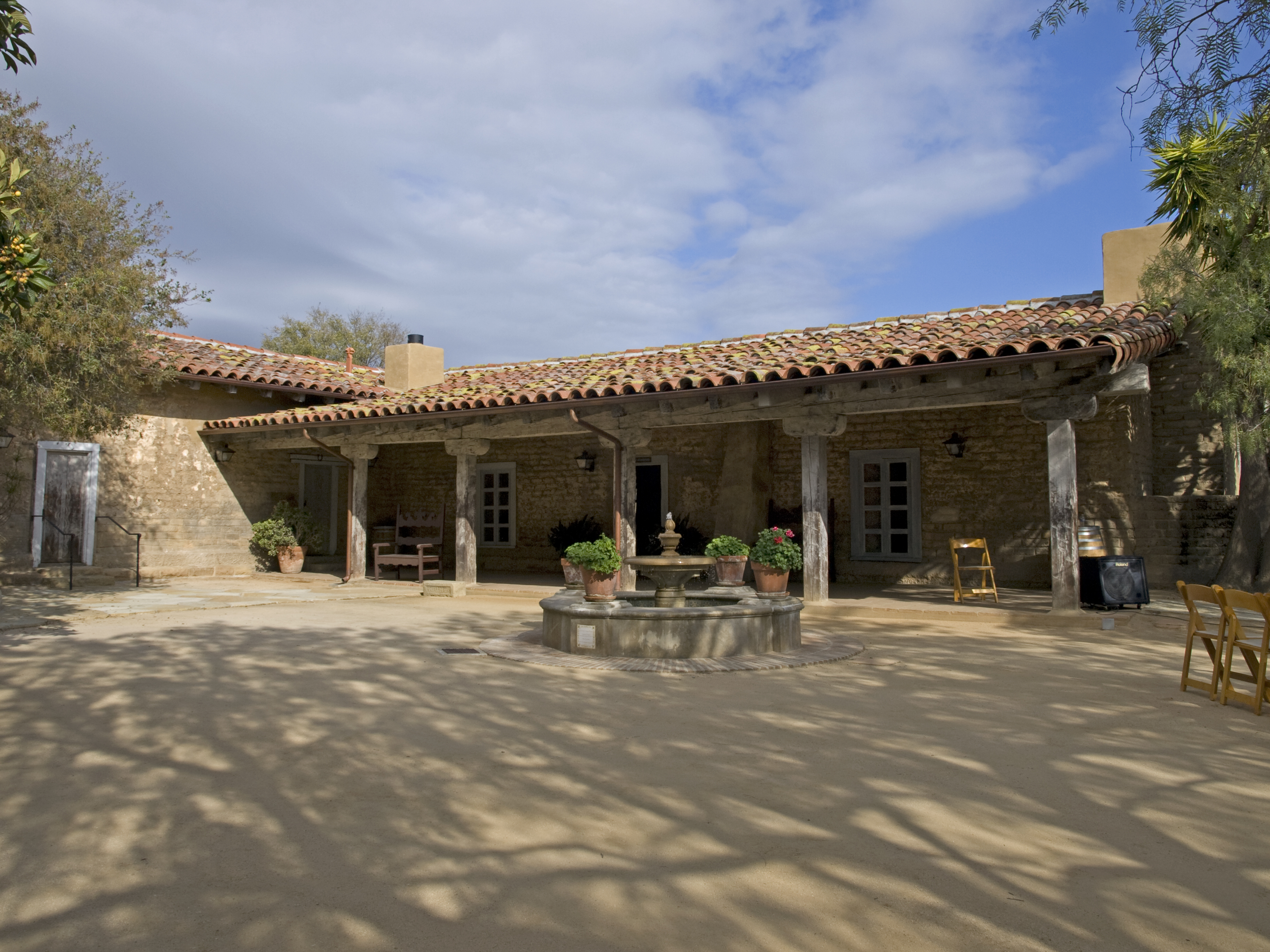
- The Historic Adobe (1836)
- Established: 1932
- Location: 136 E. De la Guerra Street, Santa Barbara, California, 93101
- Coordinates: 34.4214°N 119.698°W
- Visitors: 40 thousand annually (2009-2010): Mission: Building a future worth remembering; Admission Free, Donations Appreciated
- Director: Dacia Harwood
- Website: https://www.sbhistorical.org/

The Santa Barbara Historical Museum is located in Santa Barbara, California, U.S. It features relics from Chumash, Spanish, Mexican, Yankee, and Chinese cultures, including artifacts, photographs, furnishings and textiles, dating as far back as the 15th century.

The Museum is located at 136 East De la Guerra in the heart of historic downtown Santa Barbara. The facility was built in 1965 by the Santa Barbara Historical Society.

== History ==
In October 1932 a voluntary association was formed consisting of representatives from a number of local organizations. The Articles of Association laid out the purposes of this new group: to foster research and study of the history of the city and county of Santa Barbara; to collect, preserve, and make available materials having to do with same; and to provide for the exhibition of such materials. This new association was the Santa Barbara Historical Society.

Soon after its founding, the Society was offered the “tower” room in the Santa Barbara County Courthouse as an exhibition space and the Society began to collect, catalogue, and store artifacts and documents. For the first ten years, little changed in the character of the Historical Society.

In 1942, the Society moved to establish classes of membership, admit individuals, and set up a schedule of dues. The result was a considerable increase in membership and in the acquisition of materials for collections. The next step was taken the following year when the Society was incorporated under California law; on June 7, 1943, the Santa Barbara Historical Society became a California non-profit corporation.

As membership grew, Society activities increased. In 1947, the Society published its first book, China Trade Days in California by D. MacKenzie Brown, based upon the papers of Alpheus Thompson, an early prosperous Santa Barbara merchant. The Society's growth necessitated a larger space than the courthouse tower room. Katherine Bagg Hastings offered her home, the Trussell-Winchester Adobe at 412 West Montecito Street, as a new headquarters. The house had been built in 1854 by Horatio Gates Trussell for his family. Mrs. Hastings arranged to transfer ownership of the house to the Society upon her death; this transfer took place in 1955.

The search for a permanent home continued throughout the 1950s. Early in the decade the Society opened negotiations with the Franciscans at the Santa Barbara Mission regarding use of a portion of the mission cloister for office and exhibition space. A license agreement was signed in January 1954 and the first exhibit was held in the new quarters in May. The Society would remain housed in the Old Mission for the next eleven years.

== 1950-1960s ==
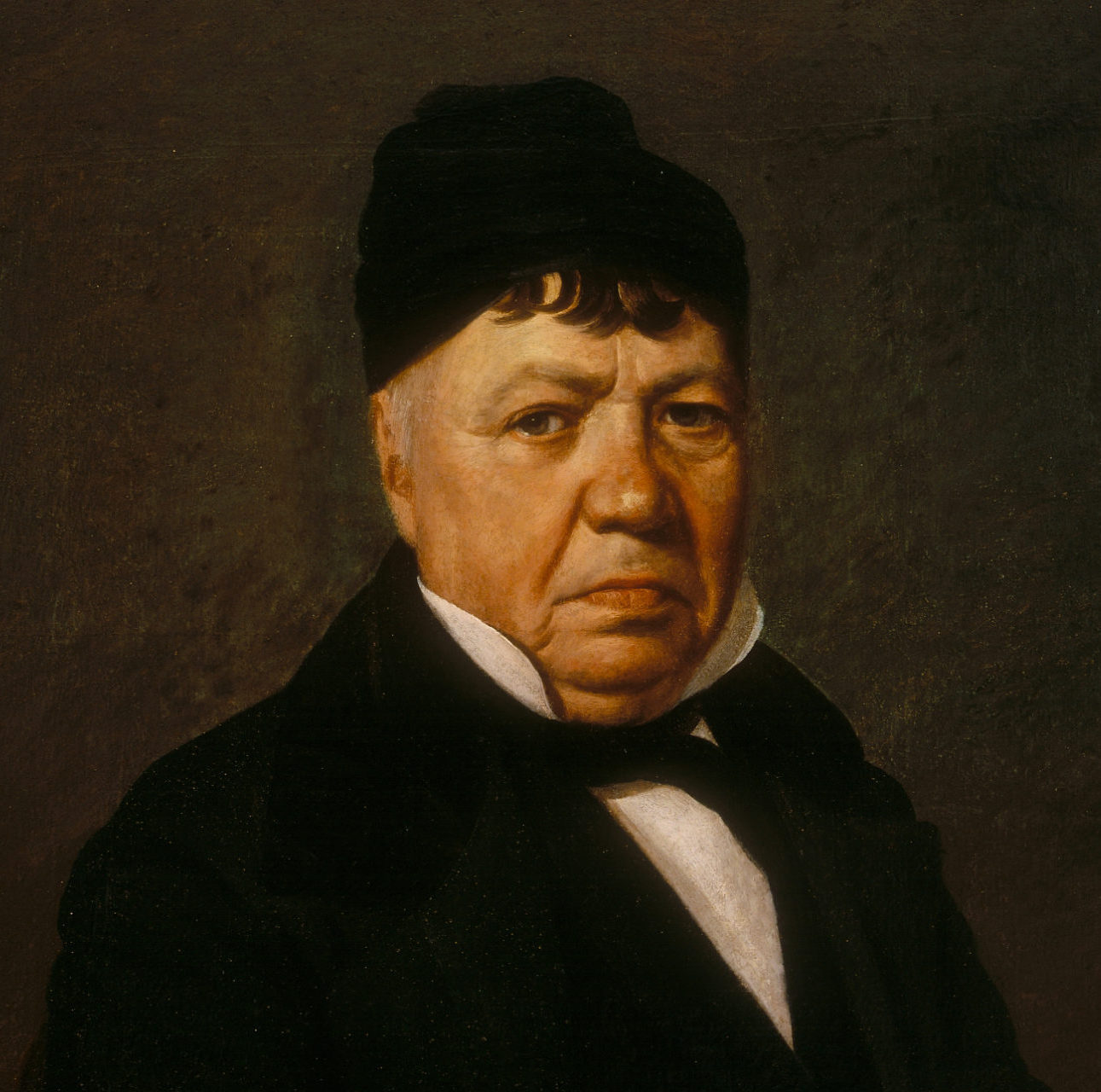
Portrait of José de la Guerra y Noriega is one of several pieces by Leonardo Barbieri held by the museum.

In April 1955 the first issue of the Society's journal, Noticias, was published and this quarterly devoted to the study of the Santa Barbara region has been in publication ever since. In 1959 the Society acquired the Judge Charles Fernald Mansion. The fourteen-room home, built by one of Santa Barbara's most prominent citizens of the late 19th century, was threatened with destruction in 1958 upon the death of the judge's last surviving child. The Society's Executive Director, W. Edwin Gledhill, spearheaded a fundraising drive to purchase the house and have it moved adjacent to the Trussell-Winchester Adobe on West Montecito Street. After a massive restoration project, Fernald House opened to the public as an historic home museum in 1962.

The dream of a permanent home for the Society was fulfilled with the dedication of the museum building at 136 East De la Guerra Street on February 28, 1965. In 1961 Santa Barbara County granted a 99-year lease to the Society for a parcel in downtown Santa Barbara and a building fund campaign was launched. In 1963 ground was broken for the adobe museum building – 25,000 square feet (2,300 m^{2}) of exhibition, office, and collections storage space. In 1964, the Society also acquired two adobes adjacent to the museum grounds from the Rancheros Visitadores, the 1817 Covarrubias Adobe and the Historic Adobe, c. 1836. The Covarrubias is used as a lecture space and houses the office of the Docent Council; the Historic Adobe headquarters the Rancheros Visitadores.

Two additional events of note in the decade of the 1960s was the dedication of the Gledhill Library in 1967, named in honor of W. Edwin Gledhill and his wife Andriette, who served for many years as executive director and Curator, respectively.

== Growth ==
In 1981 the Society began an oral history program which to date has logged over 500 interviews. Professional development was a focus in the mid-1980s as staff increased and departmental specialization initiated. A Long Range Plan, adopted in 1985 and annually reviewed, became the foundation for future advancements. In 2000 began a multi-year redesign of museum grounds and upgrade of the museum building. This entailed a $3.5 million installation of a state-of-the-art air filtration and climate control system and a complete redesign of the exhibit galleries. The core gallery installation, "The Story of Santa Barbara," opened to the public, showcasing over four and a half centuries of Santa Barbara history. Expansion of the museum's physical plant was the focus of The Gift of History Capital Campaign launched in 2003. In March 2007, Phase I of the collection vaults redesign and renovation began in line with the highest standards of collections preservation and management. In 2017, the Museum expanded adding the Edward Borein Gallery.
