= Salcabamba District =

Coordinates: 12.2020°S 74.7808°W

Salcabamba Sallqa Pampa
- District
- Interactive map of Salcabamba
- Country: Peru
- Region: Huancavelica
- Province: Tayacaja
- Capital: Salcabamba

Government
  - Mayor: Waldimar Perez Torres

Area
  - Total: 192.52 km^{2} (74.33 sq mi)
- Elevation: 3,037 m (9,964 ft)

Population (2005 census)
  - Total: 5,415
  - Density: 28.13/km^{2} (72.85/sq mi)
- Time zone: UTC-5 (PET)
- UBIGEO: 090714

Salcabamba (from Quechua Sallqa Pampa, meaning "wild plain") is one of sixteen districts of the Tayacaja Province in the Huancavelica Region) of Peru.

== Geography ==
One of the highest peaks of the district is Yana Urqu at approximately 4,600 m (15,100 ft). Other mountains are listed below:

- Hatun Wayq'u
- Inka Rumi
- Layan Q'asa
- Lima Lima
- Llant'an Urqu
- Qutu Qutu
- Tiklla Q'asa
- Turi Urqu
- T'asta
- Usnu Pata
- Wamani Marka
- Wayta Pallana
- Yana Qucha

== Ethnic groups ==
The people in the district are mainly Indigenous citizens of Quechua descent. Quechua is the language which the majority of the population (84.11%) learnt to speak in childhood, 15.49% of the residents started speaking using the Spanish language (2007 Peru Census).

== Climate ==
Climate data for Salcabamba, elevation 3,005 m (9,859 ft), (1991–2020)
Month	Jan	Feb	Mar	Apr	May	Jun	Jul	Aug	Sep	Oct	Nov	Dec	Year
Mean daily maximum °C (°F)	18.1 (64.6)	17.6 (63.7)	17.6 (63.7)	18.2 (64.8)	18.8 (65.8)	18.6 (65.5)	18.5 (65.3)	18.9 (66.0)	19.0 (66.2)	19.2 (66.6)	20.0 (68.0)	18.4 (65.1)	18.6 (65.4)
Mean daily minimum °C (°F)	9.5 (49.1)	9.5 (49.1)	9.4 (48.9)	8.9 (48.0)	8.2 (46.8)	7.4 (45.3)	6.9 (44.4)	7.3 (45.1)	8.3 (46.9)	9.0 (48.2)	9.4 (48.9)	9.6 (49.3)	8.6 (47.5)
Average precipitation mm (inches)	107.5 (4.23)	120.2 (4.73)	109.2 (4.30)	40.6 (1.60)	17.4 (0.69)	9.3 (0.37)	10.6 (0.42)	12.4 (0.49)	25.9 (1.02)	56.8 (2.24)	60.2 (2.37)	101.6 (4.00)	671.7 (26.46)
Source: National Meteorology and Hydrology Service of Peru
