= Lifeguard tower =

Watchtower for recreational swimming areas

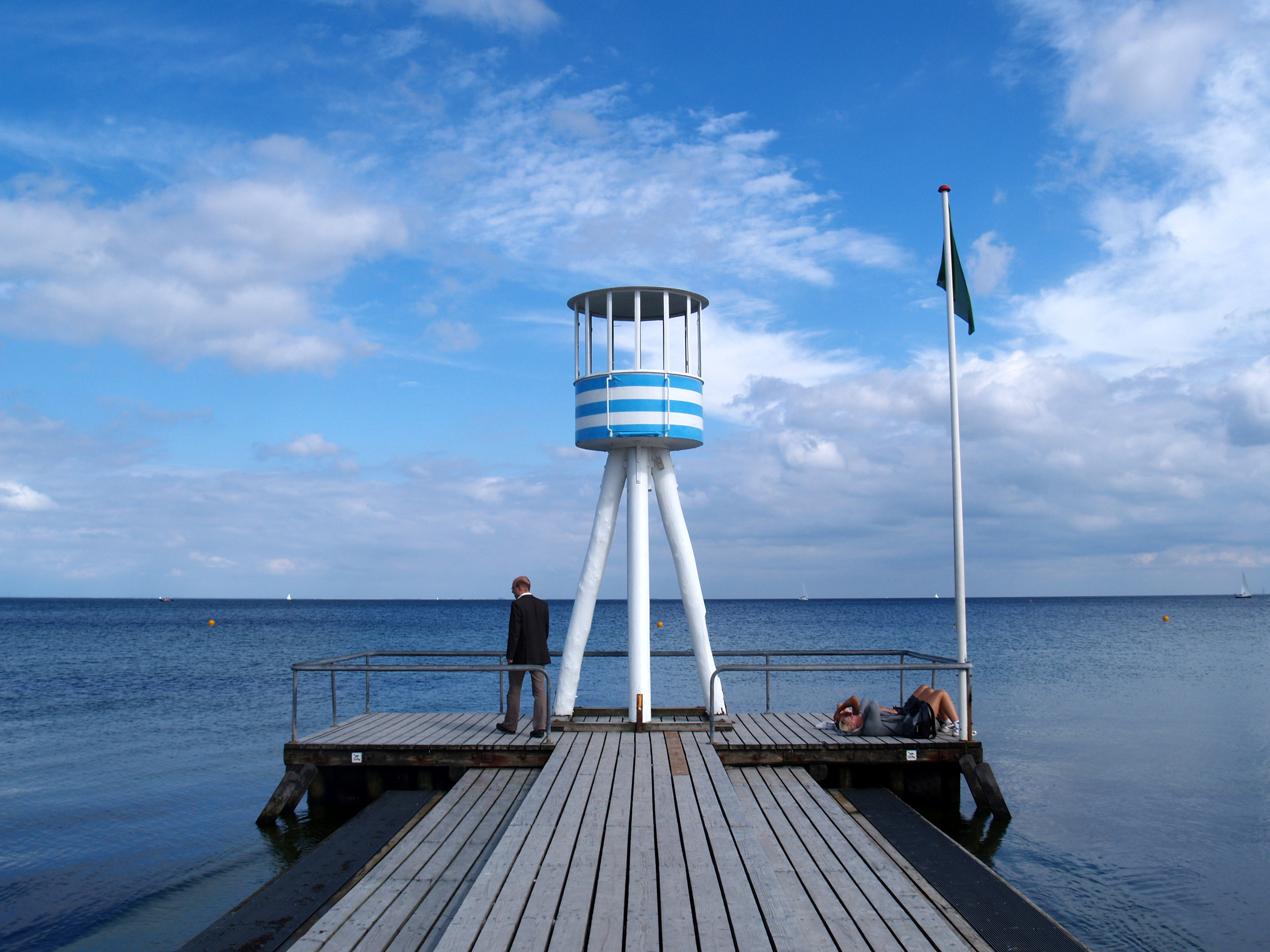
Arne Jacobsen-designed lifeguard tower at Bellevue Beach in northern Copenhagen, Denmark

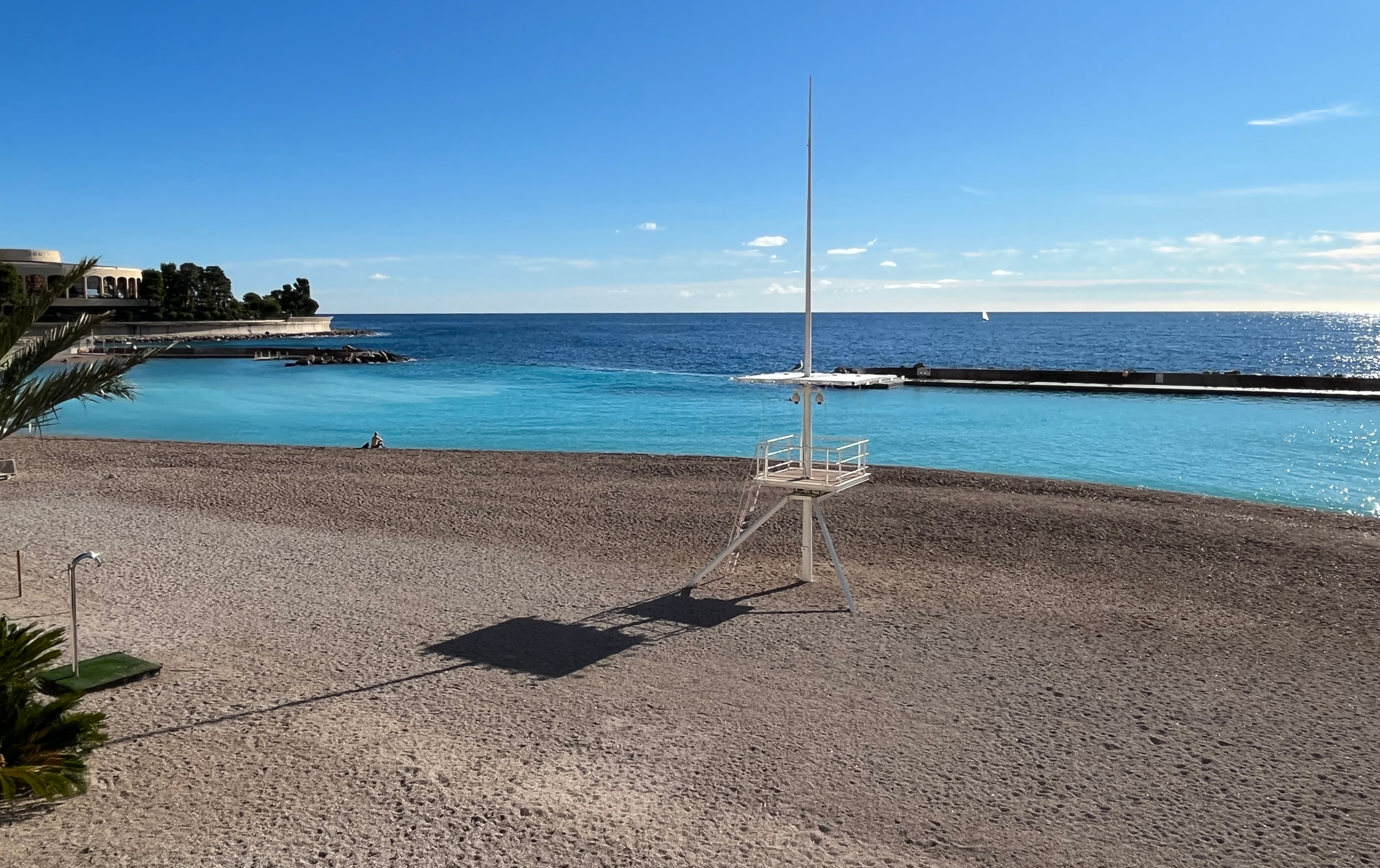
Renzo Piano-designed lifeguard tower at Larvotto Beach in Monaco

Lifeguard towers are used at recreational beaches or public swimming pools to watch and swimmers in order to prevent drownings and other dangers. Lifeguards scan for trouble from the structures, which vary from beach bungalows by the ocean to poolside towers. Lifeguard towers are also used to spot sharks and other threats.

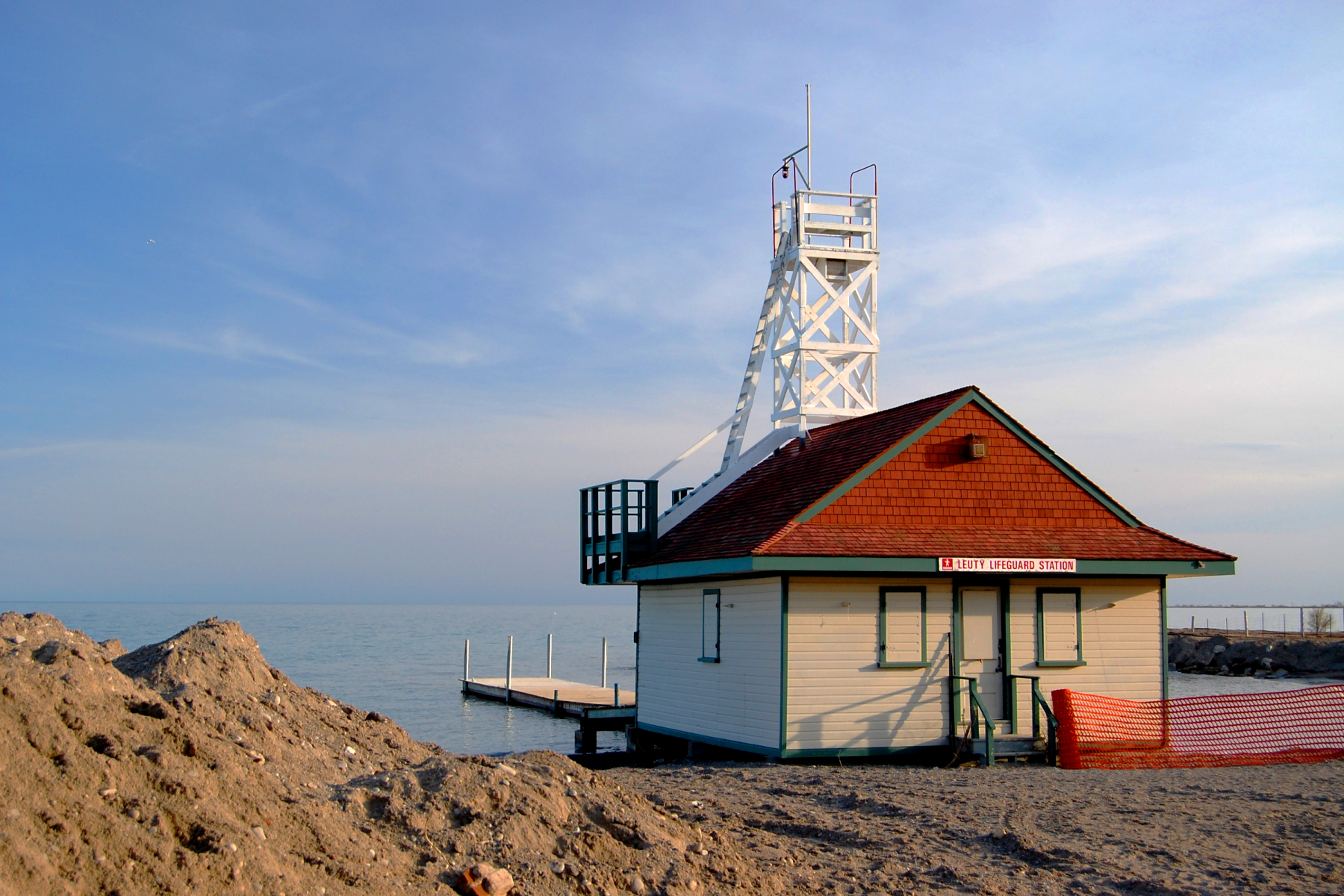
Leuty Lifeguard Station (c. 1920), Toronto, Canada

The towers have featured in television shows including Baywatch. Their construction is sometimes paid for with fundraisers, and their operation and staffing is subject to funding availability. Design contests have challenged architects to offer their visions of the structures.

== Swimming Pool Lifeguard Towers ==
Different from the regular beach lifeguard towers, a swimming pool lifeguard tower is generally smaller in size. It can be as simple as a heightened chair or as complex as a structure with a built-in ladder and a platform that edges over the pool. Entering the lifeguard tower is a routine part of a lifeguard's job, but maintaining constant surveillance and safely entering the tower is key

== In the arts ==
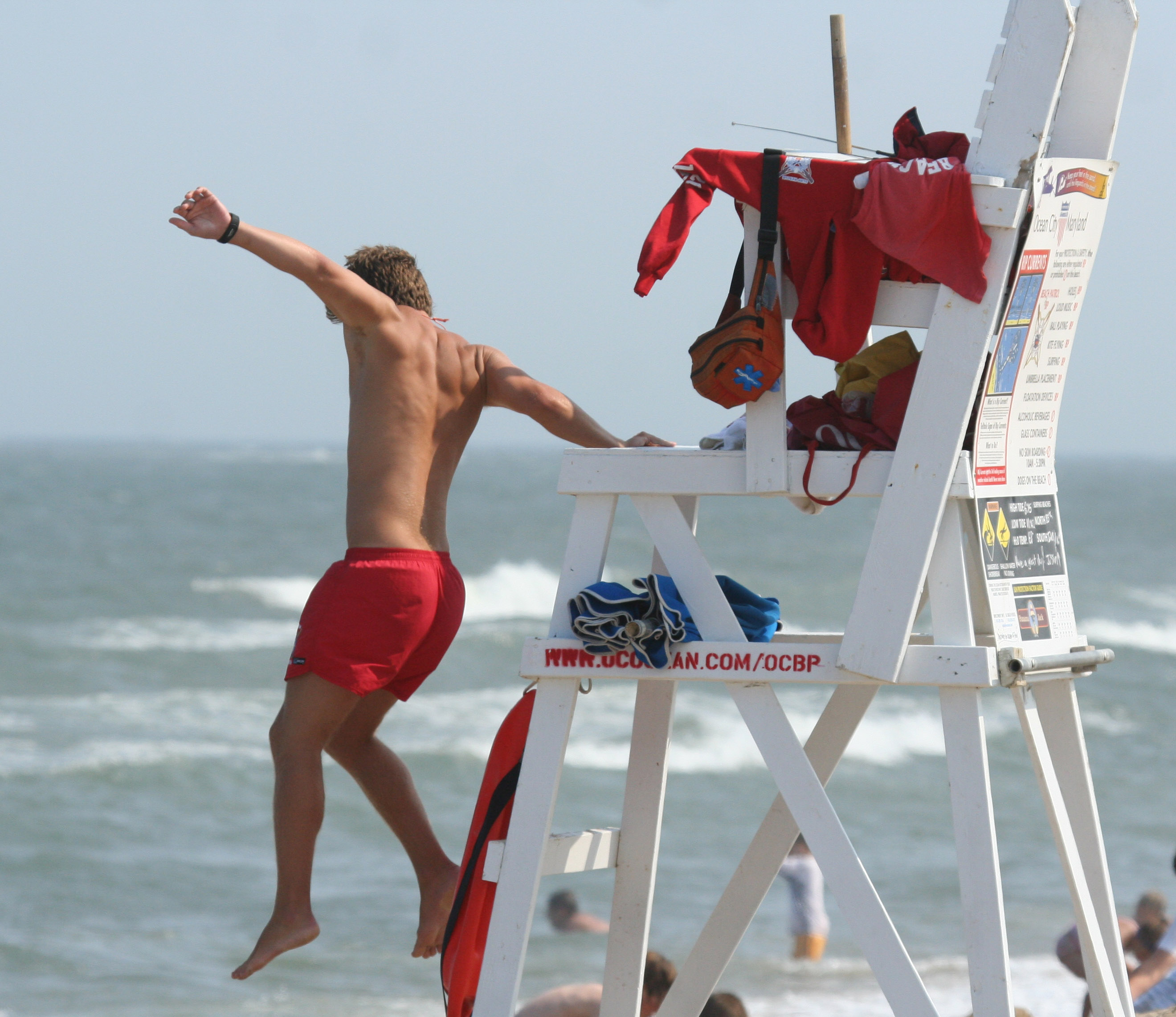
Lifeguard in action at an Ocean City, Maryland beach.

Architect Frank Gehry designed a lifeguard tower into a house as part of a remodel in Venice Beach, California in 1985.

In 1988 a gallery commissioned "14 of the world's best-known architects to design lifeguard towers, those familiar fixtures that protect lifeguards from the elements and provide landmarks to help swimmers remember where they put their towels." The designers included Stanley Tigerman, Michael Graves, Richard Meier, Charles Moore, Aldo Rossi, Hans Hollein, Antoine Predock and Cesar Pelli and were given specifications including 360-degree visibility, vandal-proofing and other requirements as well as a hypothetical budget of $17,000 for their designs. The "superstar" West Coast architects were part of an exhibit of drawings and models of proposals for designer lifeguard towers in 1990.

A similar contest was held in 2004 in Miami Beach with 25 local architects. The contest was organized by Jeremy Calleros Gauger, a graduate student at the University of Miami School of Architecture, and the designs were displayed at the Ocean Beach Auditorium. The winners announced were a functional cube with louvers and a modified surfboard design. A "striking" design called Plank earned an honorable because "there had to be space for a lifeguard to change out of a wet bathing suit."

== In popular culture ==
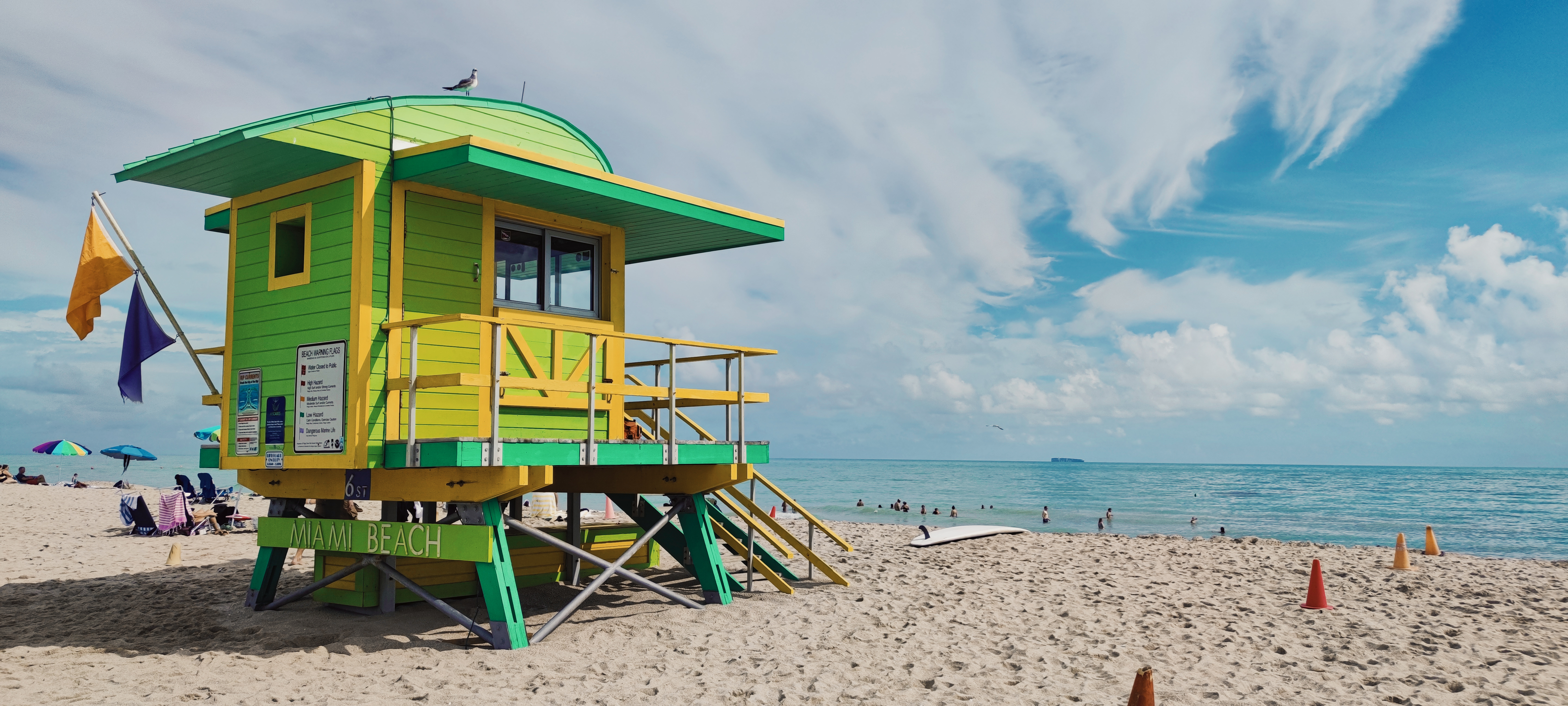
Lifeguard stand in Miami Beach

A May 21, 2006 Family Guy episode featured Stewie trying to destroy his rival by blowing up the lifeguard tower.
