= Parliamentary Select Committee on Aboriginal Tribes =

1830s British parliamentary committee

The Parliamentary Select Committee on Aboriginal Tribes, or the Aborigines Select Committee, was a select committee of the Parliament of the United Kingdom.

Fowell Buxton chaired the committee, which had 16 members. Other members included Charles Lushington, Rufane Shaw Donkin, and William Ewart Gladstone (later prime minister).

Buxton moved for Parliament to create the committee in March 1835. Hearings started in August 1835 and the committee's report was released in 1837. Its terms of reference instructed it to

... consider what measures ought to be adopted with regard to the native inhabitants of countries where British settlements are made, and to the neighbouring tribes, in order to secure to them the due observance of justice and the protection of their rights; to promote the spread of civilization among them, and to lead them to the peaceful and voluntary reception of the Christian religion.

The terms of reference gave the committee the ability to investigate policies of the British Empire with respect to Indigenous people in southern Africa, Canada, Newfoundland, New South Wales, and Van Diemen's Land.

The committee's recommendations included more "missionary activity" in the empire; that the alienation of land by Indigenous people be regulated; an end to the sale of liquor; stricter regulation of contracts of labour with Indigenous people; and that Indigenous affairs be handled by the imperial Parliament, not colonial legislatures.

The report catalyzed the formation of the Aborigines' Protection Society, which was founded soon after the report came out.

According to historian Alan Lester, the committee "brought the relations between officials, settlers and indigenous peoples on the frontiers of colonial settlement to the very centre of the empire". John W. Cell argues that its report adopted rhetorical tropes of the Victorian era: "[t]he language of this report—its emphasis on Providence in having chosen Great Britain for a sacred mission in the world, on the need to atone for past sins, on the day of judgment when the nation would be called to account—is characteristic of this early Victorian period."

== Sources ==
- Curtin, Philip D., ed. (1971). Imperialism. Harper & Row. ISBN 0-06-138455-0. OCLC 206249.
- Lester, Alan (19 August 2005). Imperial Networks: Creating Identities in Nineteenth-Century South Africa and Britain. Routledge. doi:10.4324/9780203995723. ISBN 978-0-203-99572-3.
