= Inert =

Inert may refer to:

- Chemically inert, not chemically reactive
  - Inert gas
  - Noble gas, historically called inert gas
- Inert knowledge, information which one can express but not use
- Inert ingredient, a component of the excipient of a pharmaceutical drug
- Inert munition, a round that does not contain any energetic material
- Inert prime, a type of behaviour of a prime under an algebraic extension
- Inert waste, waste which is neither chemically nor biologically reactive and will not decompose

== See also ==
- Inerter (disambiguation)
- Inertia (disambiguation)
