= Henry Jermyn (antiquary) =

English antiquarian (1767–1820)

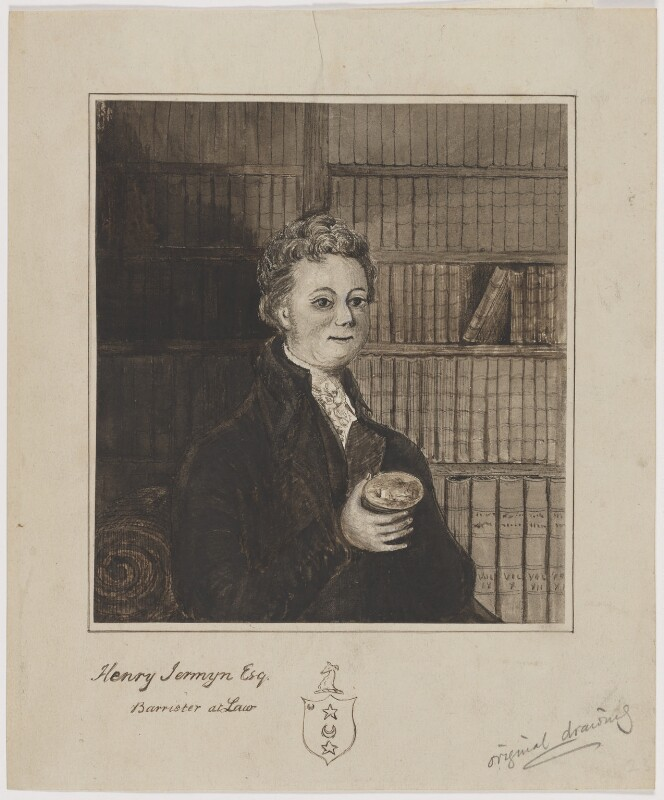
- Born: 11 February 1767
- Died: 27 November 1820 (aged 53)
- Occupation: Antiquarian

Henry Jermyn (11 February 1767 – 27 November 1820) was an English antiquarian from Suffolk.

== Biography ==
Jermyn was born on 11 February 1767, the second son of Peter Jermyn the elder (1737–1810), solicitor, of Halesworth, Suffolk, by Elizabeth, daughter and coheiress of Dr. Samuel Rye of the same place. He studied for a time at St. John's College, Cambridge, but did not graduate, and was afterwards called to the bar from Lincoln's Inn. He resided at Sibton, Suffolk. He died on 27 November 1820. In May 1791, he married Harriott Lucke of Sussex, widow of Thomas Douglas, by whom he had two daughters. His portrait by Mrs. Pulham has been engraved (Nichols, Herald and Geneal. v. 439–40).

Jermyn amassed materials for a history of Suffolk in conjunction with his friend David Elisha Davy [q. v.], each receiving a copy of the other's work. At Davy's request Jermyn's collections were not sold at the sale of his effects in 1821, but were subsequently bought by Herbert Gurney, and presented to the British Museum in 1830. James Jermyn [q. v.], cousin of Henry Jermyn, accused Davy, in a published pamphlet, of fraud in his relations with his cousin, but Davy vindicated his conduct in notes to the copy which is now at the British Museum. Jermyn's manuscripts consist of ‘Suffolk Pedigrees’ (Add. MS. 17097), ‘Index to Suffolk Families and Places, List of Parishes, &c.’ (Add. MSS. 17099–100), and ‘Collections for the County of Suffolk’ (Add. MSS. 8168–218).
