= Carrillo (surname) =

Carrillo is a surname.

The House of Carrillo was a large Spanish noble house that traces its origins from the ancient Kingdom of Castille.

Other notable people with the surname include:

- Álvaro Carrillo (1921–1969), Mexican music composer
- Amado Carrillo Fuentes (1956–1997), Mexican drug lord
- Ana Carrillo Domínguez (1898–1974), known as Anita Carrillo, communist activist and a captain in the Spanish Republican Army.
- André Carrillo (born 1991), Peruvian footballer
- Aníbal Carrillo, Paraguayan politician
- Carlos Antonio Carrillo (1783–1852), Governor of Alta California
- Cesar Carrillo (born 1984), American baseball player
- Charles M. Carrillo (born 1956), American artist
- Donovan Carrillo (born 1999), Mexican figure skater
- Edna Carrillo (born 1991), Mexican judoka
- Elpidia Carrillo (born 1961), Mexican actress
- Enrique Gómez Carrillo (1873–1927), Guatemalan writer
- Ernesto Perez-Carrillo (born 1952), Cuban master cigar maker
- Erwin Carrillo (born 1983), Colombian footballer
- Fernando Carrillo (b. 1966), Venezuelan actor
- Fernando Carrillo Flórez (born 1963), Colombian politician
- Gil Álvarez Carrillo de Albornoz (1310–1367), Spanish cardinal and ecclesiastical leader
- Guido Carrillo (born 1991), Argentinian football player
- Humberto Carrillo (born 1995), Mexican professional wrestler
- Joan Carrillo (born 1968), Spanish footballer and manager
- Jorge Carrillo Olea (born 1937), Mexican politician, head of intelligence services.
- José Ángel Carrillo (born 1994), Spanish footballer
- José Antonio Carrillo (1796–1862), the three-time mayor of pre-statehood Los Angeles
- José Raimundo Carrillo (1749–1809), member of 1769 Portolà expedition
- Juan José Carrillo (1842–1916), the mayor of Santa Monica and Santa Barbara, California
- Julián Carrillo (1875–1965), Mexican composer and musical theorist
- Laiza Carrillo (born 1968), Cuban long and triple jumper
- Leo Carrillo (1880–1961), American actor
- Lluís Carrillo (born 1971), Spanish football manager
- Luis Carrillo (died 1568), Spanish colonial administrator
- Mario Carrillo (born 1956), a Mexican football coach
- Maite Carrillo (born 1993), better known as Mayichi, Spanish gamer and Twitch streamer
- Mónica Carrillo (born 1976), Spanish journalist and novelist
- Nabor Carrillo Flores (1911–1967), Mexican nuclear physicist
- Nelly Carrillo Tarazona de Espinoza (1927–2017), Peruvian herpetologist
- Pablo San Segundo Carrillo (born 1970), Spanish chess grandmaster
- Ramón Carrillo (1906–1956), Argentine neurosurgeon, neurobiologist
- Roxanna Carrillo, Peruvian feminist and activist
- Santiago Carrillo (1915–2012), Spanish communist leader
- Tony Carrillo (politician) (1936–2020), American politician
- Vicente Carrillo Fuentes (born 1962), Mexican drug lord, brother of Amado Carrillo Fuentes
- Vicente Carrillo Leyva (born 1976), Mexican drug lord, son of Amado Carrillo Fuentes
- Yadhira Carrillo (born 1972), Mexican actress

== See also ==
- Carillo, surname
