= Genser =

Genser is a surname. Notable people with the surname include:

- Jared Genser, American human rights lawyer
- Ken Genser (1950–2010), American politician
