= Carrillo =

Carrillo may refer to:

== Places ==
- Carrillo (canton), the fifth division of Guanacaste Province, Costa Rica
- Puerto Carrillo, a small town in Guanacaste, Costa Rica
  - Carrillo Airport, which serves Puerto Carrillo
  - Carrillo (beach), a beach adjacent to Puerto Carrillo, Costa Rica
- Leo Carrillo State Park, a beach in Thousand Oaks, California, USA

== Other uses ==
- Carrillo (crater), a lunar crater
- Carrillo (surname), including a list of people with the surname
- House of Carrillo, a large Spanish noble house that traces its origins from the ancient Kingdom of Castille
- USS Carrillo, a United States Navy cargo ship in commission from 1918 to 1919

== See also ==
- Carillo, surname
