= Kevin McKeown =

Kevin McKeown may refer to:

- Kevin McKeown (footballer) (born 1967), Scottish footballer
- Kevin McKeown (politician) (born 1948), Californian politician
