= Carrillo family of California =

Californio family

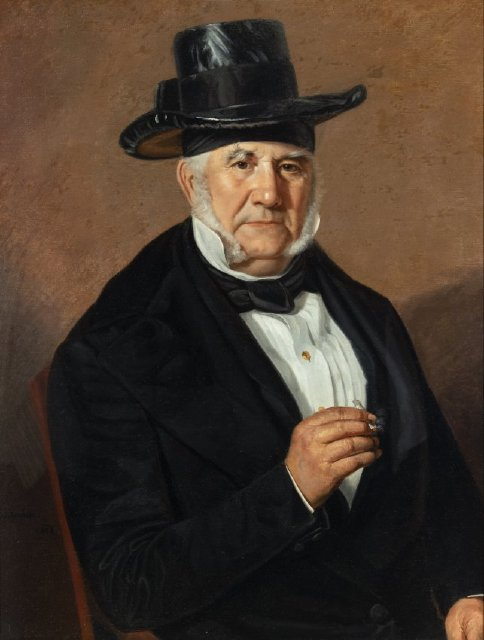
Carlos Antonio Carrillo.

The Carrillo family is a prominent Californio family of Southern California. Members of the family held extensive rancho grants and numerous important political positions, including Governor of Alta California, Mayor of Los Angeles, Mayor of Santa Barbara, Mayor of Santa Monica, and a signer of the Californian Constitution.

== Notable members ==
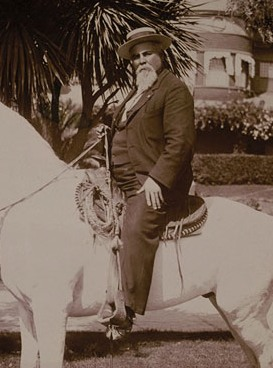
Juan José Carrillo.

=== José Raimundo Carrillo ===
The family was founded by Juan Jose Carrillo who in 1715 worked for the Jesuits at Presidio Loreto. His grandson, José Raimundo Carrillo, was born in Loreto, Baja California in 1749 and came to Alta California with the Portolà expedition in 1769. He was a member of the company that founded Presidio Santa Barbara in 1782, and served as Commandante of Presidio Santa Barbara from 1802 to 1807, and of Presidio of San Diego from 1807 to 1809. On April 23, 1781 Carrillo married Tomasa Ignacia Lugo in a ceremony performed by Junipero Serra in San Carlos. She was born in Sinaloa de Leyva, a presidio community opposite Loreto on the other side of the Gulf of California. While Raimundo Carrillo was Commander of Presidio Santa Barbara in 1806, his cousin Francisco Maria Ruiz Carrillo was acting Commander of Presidio San Diego, and would in 1809 succeed don Raimundo in that position. Francisco's brother was Jose Manuel Ruiz Carrillo, the commander of La Frontera (i.e., northern Baja California) 1797 to 1820. Thus, for a brief moment, the Carrillos controlled Santa Barbara to the Bay of San Quintin in Baja California.

=== Carlos Antonio Carrillo ===
Carlos Antonio Carrillo was born in Santa Barbara in 1783. He was granted Santa Rosa Island in a land grant from Governor Manuel Micheltorena. He served as a member of the Congress of the Union from 1831 to 1832. Carrillo was nominated as Governor of Alta California in opposition to Juan Bautista Alvarado, from 1837 to 1838, until he relinquished his claim to Alvarado.

=== José Antonio Carrillo ===
José Antonio Carrillo was born in Santa Barbara in 1796. He served three times as the Mayor of Los Angeles. He distinguished himself for achieving victory at the Battle of Rancho Domínguez. He served as a delegate to the Monterey Constitutional Convention of 1849 and was a signer of the Californian Constitution.

=== Juan José Carrillo ===
Juan José Carrillo was born in Santa Barbara in 1842. He was prominent a politician and served as Mayor of Santa Monica from 1890 to 1897, as well as a Santa Monica City Trustee from 1888 to 1898, the longest serving trustee in history. He also served as the last City Marshal of Los Angeles from 1875 to 1876.

=== Leo Carrillo ===
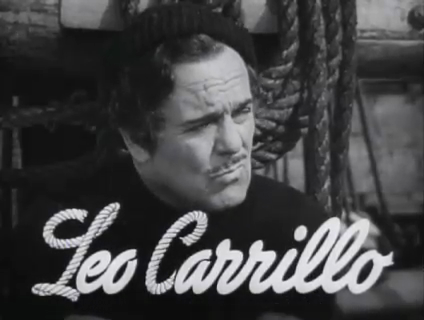
Leo Carrillo.

Leopoldo Antonio Carrillo, popularly known as Leo Carrillo, was born in Los Angeles in 1880. He was a Hollywood actor in the early 20th century, best known for his role in The Cisco Kid. He was also a noted California conservationist, playing in a key role in the Californian government's acquisition of Hearst Castle in San Simeon and Anza-Borrego Desert State Park in California's Colorado Desert. Leo Carrillo State Park is named for him.

=== Other members ===
- Joaquín Carrillo, who served as the 3rd Mayor of Santa Barbara, from 1851 to 1852.
- José Carrillo, who served as the 8th Mayor of Santa Barbara, in 1855.
- Guillermo Carrillo, who served as the 11th Mayor of Santa Barbara, from 1858 to 1859.
- Pedro Carrillo, who served in the California Senate, from 1853 to 1854.
- María Ygnacia López de Carrillo, founder of Santa Rosa, California
- Francisca Benicia Carrillo Vallejo, pioneer and wife of Mariano Guadalupe Vallejo

== Legacy ==
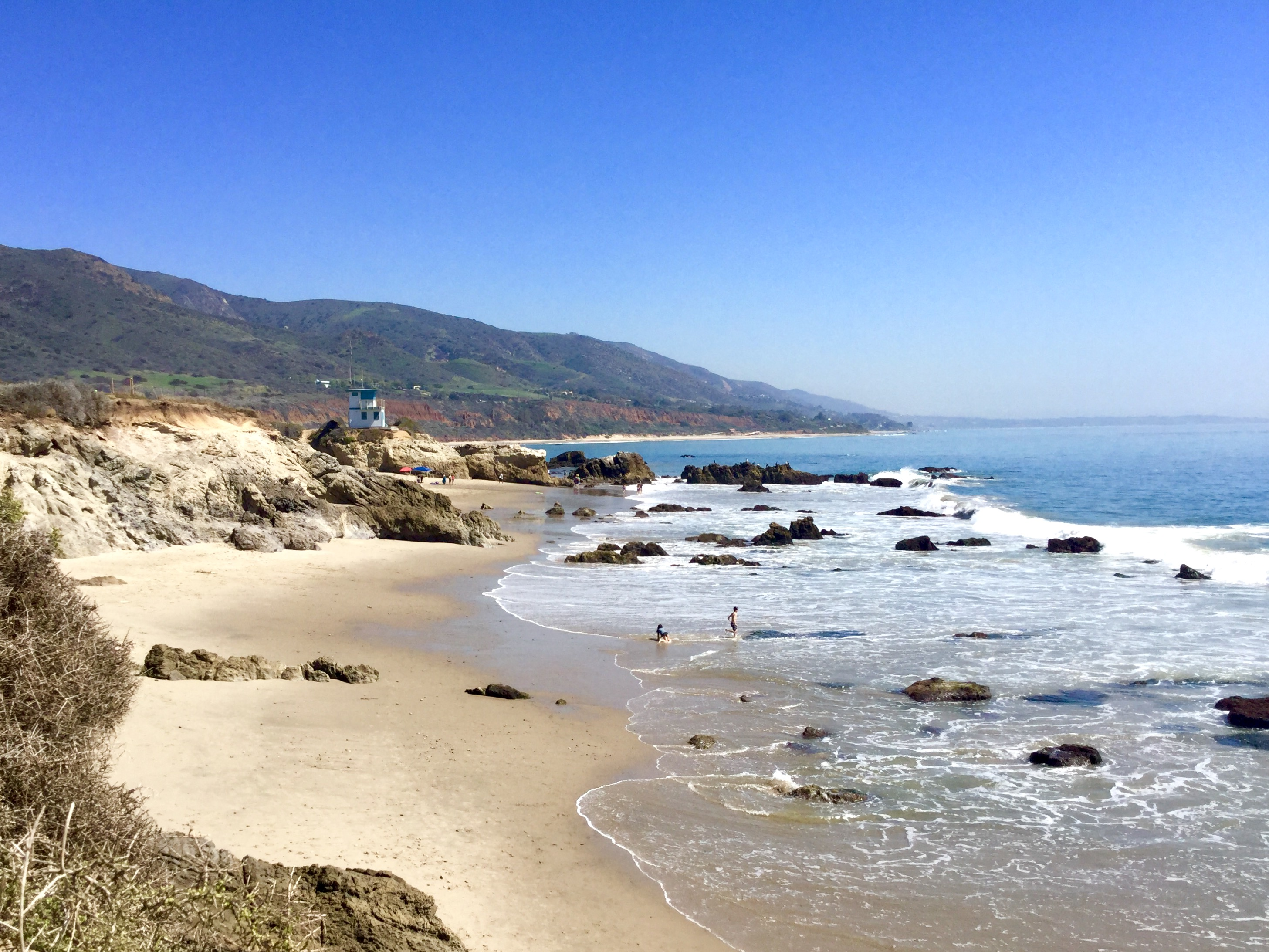
Carrillo State Park in Malibu.

Leo Carrillo State Park, in Los Angeles County and Ventura County, is named in honor of Leo Carrillo.

The Hill-Carrillo Adobe in Santa Barbara is the former residence of Guillermo Carrillo.

The Casa de Carrillo in San Diego is the former residence of Joaquín Carrillo.

Leo Carrillo's former estate, Rancho de los Quiotes, in Carlsbad is open to the public as the Carrillo Ranch Historic Park.

Maria Carrillo High School in Santa Rosa is named María Ygnacia López de Carrillo.

Carrillo Elementary School in Orange County is named after Leo Carrillo.

Carrillo Elementary School in San Marcos is named after the family.

== See also ==
- List of Californios people
- Media related to Carrillo family of California at Wikimedia Commons
