= José Raimundo Carrillo =

- Born: 1749; Loreto, Baja California, New Spain
- Died: November 10, 1809; San Diego, Alta California, New Spain
- Burial place: Chapel, Presidio of San Diego
- Spouse: Tomasa Ignacia Lugo
- Relatives: Carlos Antonio Carrillo (son) * José Antonio Carrillo (son) * Juan José Carrillo (grandson) * Leo Carrillo (great-great-grandson)
- Military career
- Allegiance: New Spain
- Branch: Spanish Army
- Rank: Captain
- Commands: Presidio of San Diego
- Conflicts: Portolá expedition (1769)

Captain José Raimundo Carrillo (1749–1809) was Californio soldier and settler, known as an early settler of San Diego, California and as the founder of the Carrillo family of California.

== Biography ==
Carrillo was born in 1749 in New Spain (present-day México) at Loreto, Baja California. He came to upper Las Californias as a soldier with the first expedition of Gaspar de Portolà in 1769, and rose to rank of Captain.

Carrillo served at the Presidio of Santa Barbara, Presidio of Monterey, and in 1806, the Presidio of San Diego. He was commandant of the Presidio of San Diego during 1807–1809. In 1809 he died and was buried in the chapel on Presidio Hill November 10, 1809.

On April 23, 1781, Carrillo married Tomasa Ignacia Lugo, daughter of the soldier Francisco Lugo, with the ceremony performed by Junipero Serra at San Carlos, New Spain.

The children of José Raimundo Carrillo and Tomasa Ignacia Lugo.
Name	Birth/Death	Married	Notes
Carlos Antonio de Jesus Carrillo	1783 - 1852	Maria Castro	Governor of Alta California from 1837 to 1838. Grantee of Rancho Sespe.
Maria Antonia Carrillo	1786 - 1843	José de la Guerra y Noriega	
Anastasio José Carrillo	1788 - 1850	Concepción Garcia	Grantee of Rancho Punta de la Concepcion. His son, Guillermo Carrillo, is the namesake of the Hill-Carrillo Adobe in Santa Barbara
Domingo Antonio Ignacio Carrillo	1791 - 1837	Concepción Pico	Grantee of Rancho Las Virgenes.
Maria Ignacia Josefa Carrillo	1794 - 1802		Died in childhood.
José Antonio Ezequiel Carrillo	1796 - 1862	Estefanía Pico	Served as three-time mayor of pre-statehood Los Angeles. Grantee of Rancho Las Posas.

- His Grandson, Juan José Carrillo (1842–1916), the mayor of Santa Monica, California.
- His Great-great Grandson, Leo Carrillo, (1881–1961) was a Hollywood actor and conservationist.
