= Robert Holbrook =

Robert Holbrook may refer to:

- Robert Hobrook (politician) of Santa Monica City Council
- Robert Boyd Holbrook (born 1981), actor

== See also ==
- Robert Holbrook Smith (1879–1950), American physician and surgeon
