= Santa Monica City Hall =

Building in Santa Monica, California, U.S.

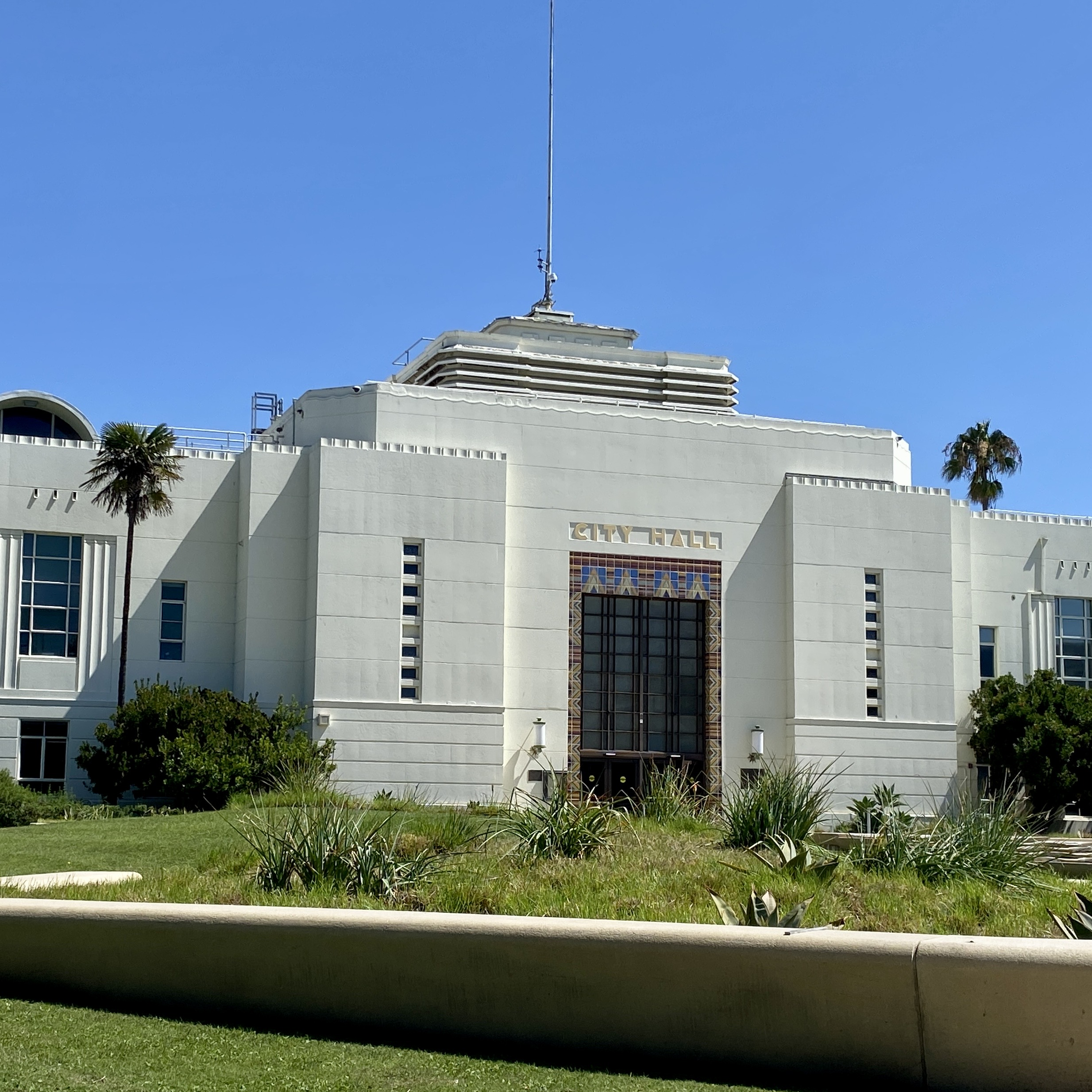
- Front entrance, 2023
- Interactive map of the Santa Monica City Hall area

General information
- Location: Santa Monica, California, United States
- Coordinates: 34°0′42.5″N 118°29′29.5″W

Santa Monica City Hall is a government building in Santa Monica, California. Completed in 1939, the Art Deco-style building was funded in part by the Public Works Administration.

== See also ==
- List of Art Deco architecture in California
- List of City of Santa Monica Designated Historic Landmarks
- Santa Monica City Council
