= Carrillo Ranch Historic Park =

- Rancho de los Quiotes
- U.S. National Register of Historic Places
- California Historical Landmark
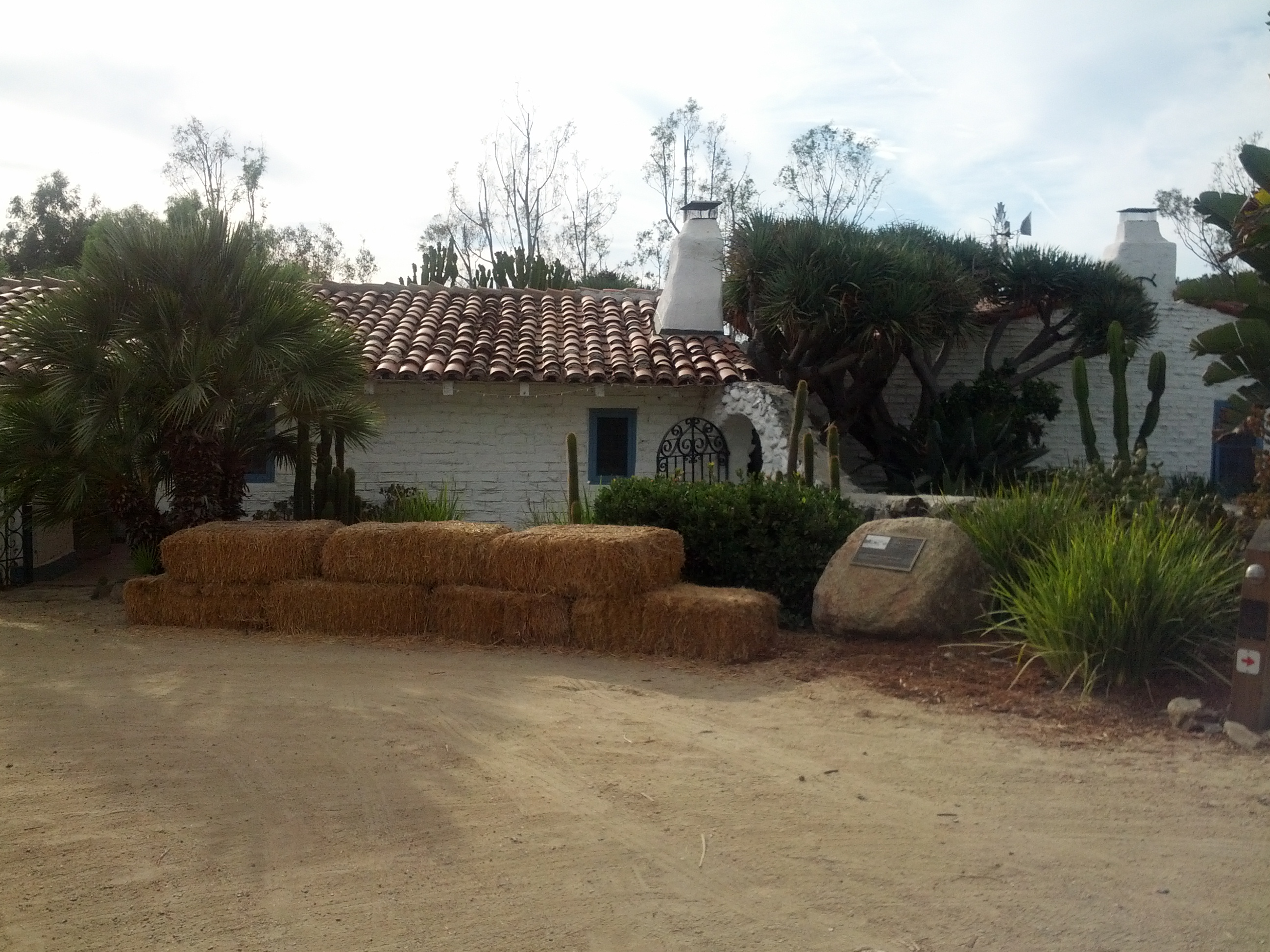
- Rancho De Los Quiotes

- Location within San Diego County, California Location within California Location within the United States
- Nearest city: Carlsbad, California
- Coordinates: 33°07′13″N 117°14′08″W
- Area: 27 acres (11 ha)
- Built: 1937–1940
- Architect: Leo Carrillo
- Architectural style: Spanish
- NRHP reference No.: 92000261
- CHISL No.: 1020

Significant dates
- Added to NRHP: March 31, 1992
- Designated CHISL: 1996

Rancho de los Quiotes, today known as the Leo Carrillo Historic Park, is a historic estate near Carlsbad, California. The rancho was built as a weekend retreat for actor Leo Carrillo, who designed the property in the style of Spanish hacienda estates. Situated on land once inhabited by the Luiseño people, the original 2,538 acres (1,027 ha) were located on an old Spanish land grant. Carrillo purchased 1,700 acres (690 ha) for $17 an acre in 1937, adding additional acreage two years later. Over the next few years, he designed and built a working rancho (Spanish style ranch) in tribute to his family, the Carrillo family of California, who arrived in California in the 1700s.

In 1976, the city of Carlsbad acquired the 10.5 acres (4.2 ha) of the ranch that had been listed on the National Register of Historic Places and added an additional 16.4 acres (6.6 ha) to create the Leo Carrillo Ranch Historic Park. There are 17 contributing properties on the ranch, including the main adobe house and "Deedie's house", a smaller adobe artist studio built especially for his wife Edith

== Gallery ==
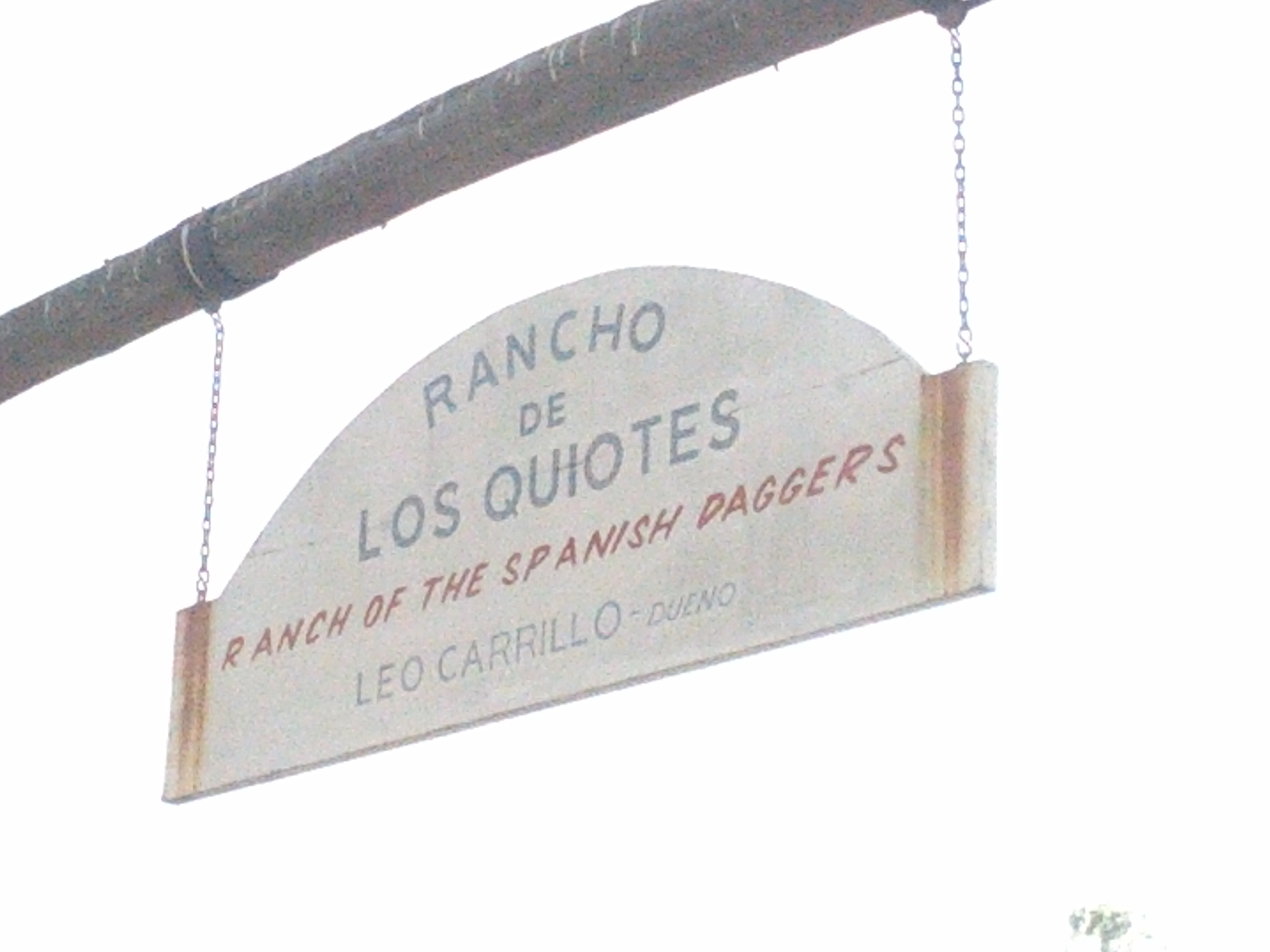

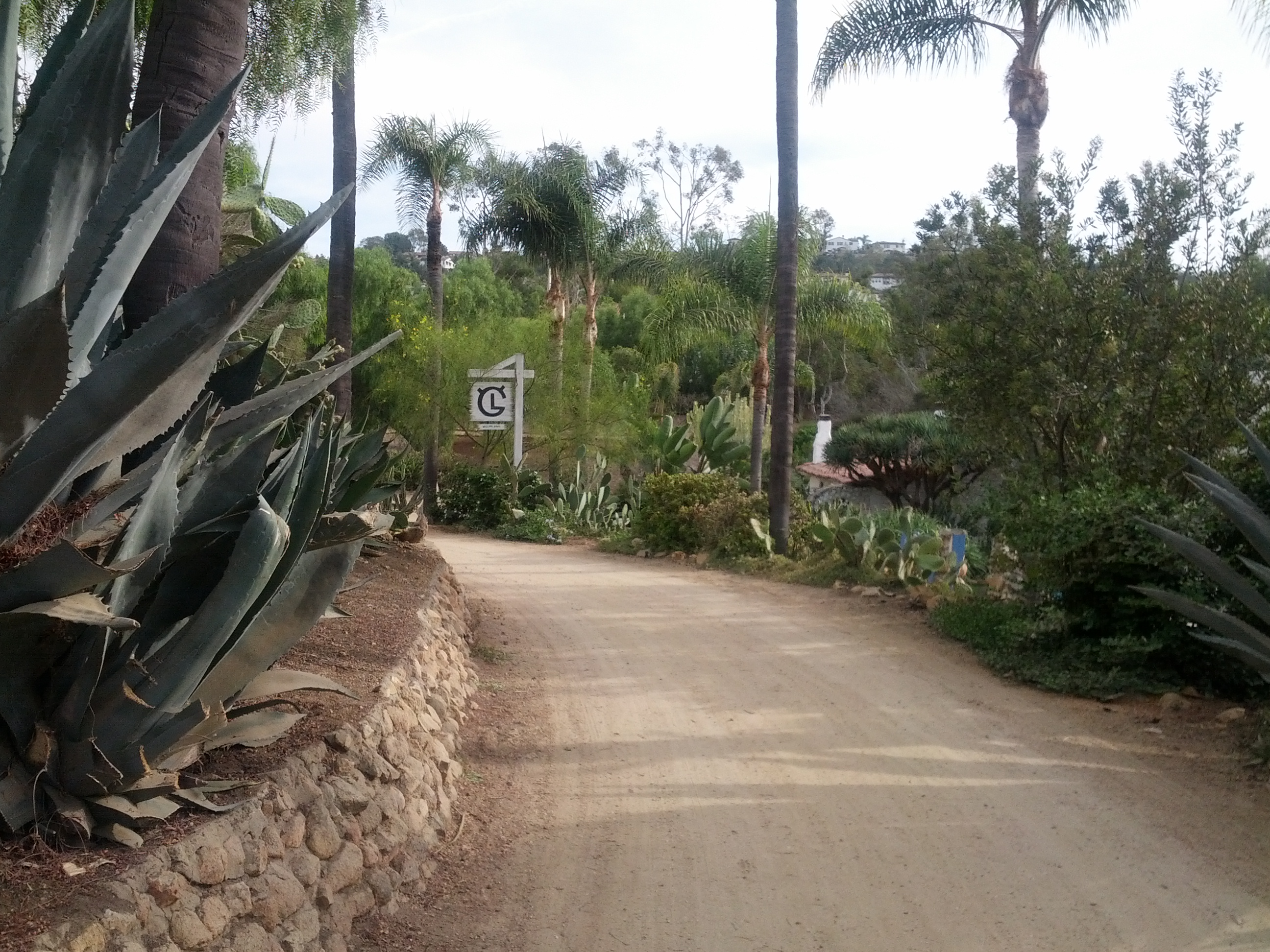

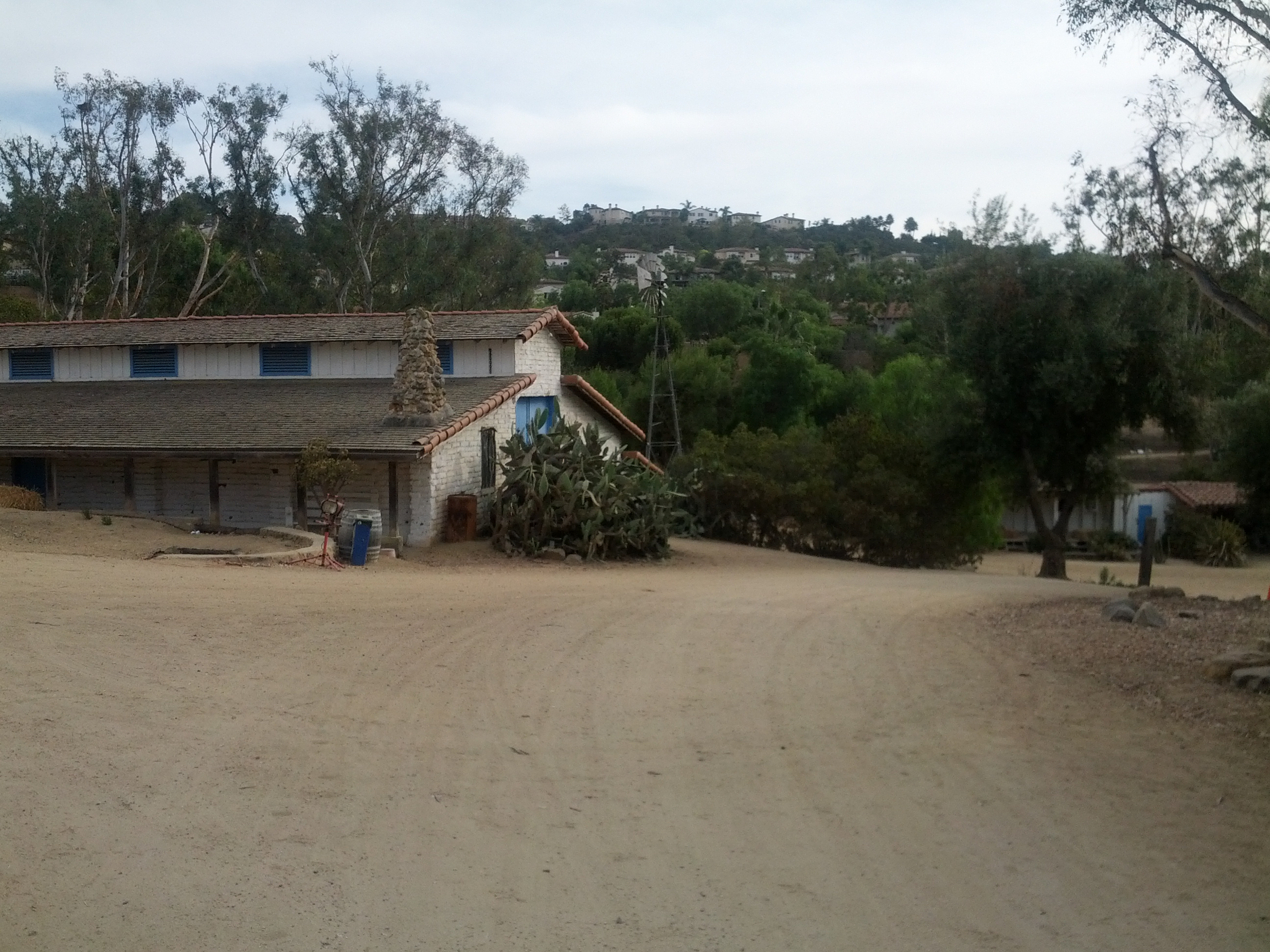

== See also ==
- California Historical Landmarks in San Diego County, California
- National Register of Historic Places listings in San Diego County, California
