= William C. Warren =

Los Angeles marshal

- Born: c. 1836; Michigan, U.S.
- Died: October 31, 1870 (aged 33–34); Los Angeles, California, U.S.
- Spouse: Juanita Lopez (m. 1860)
- Relatives: 3 daughters
- Police career
- Country: United States of America
- Allegiance: Los Angeles, California
- Department: Los Angeles City Marshal
- Service years: 10
- Rank: Deputy City Marshal (1860–1865); City Marshal (1865–1870)

William C. Warren (c. 1836 – October 31, 1870) was the first regularly employed law enforcement officer in the city of Los Angeles. He earned that distinction when he was elected Los Angeles City Marshal from 1865 until 1869. Warren served as leader of the local police force that consisted of six officers. His second marshalship had elements consistent with the renegade nature of that era, when he was shot dead by one of his deputy officers over a quarrel regarding reward money.

== Biography ==
William C. Warren was born on a farm in southwestern Michigan in 1836. He migrated to California and by June 1860 Warren was the deputy of City Marshal Thomas Trafford and was living with him. In December 1860 he married Juanita Lopez, a daughter of the Paredon Blanco settler Jose Francisco Lopez. The couple had three daughters. The eldest, Ida, became the mother of the later Los Angeles County Sheriff Eugene Biscailuz.

As a deputy city marshal, at the end of 1861, Warren assisted J. E. Pleasants, overseeing one of William Wolfskill's ranches, to pursue and capture several horse thieves who were sent to the penitentiary.

Warren, a Republican, was elected Los Angeles City Marshal from 1865 to 1869 with the help of the Californio voters in this Democrat dominated city. As city marshal once again in 1869, Warren also served as the first head of the local police force of six officers in a city that had about 5,600 residents. The city granted Warren $50 to furnish his headquarters and $25 a month for rent. He also was dog catcher and tax collector, being paid 25% of all the tax money he collected. However the following year:

During the second marshalship of William C. Warren, when Joe Dye, was one of his deputy officers, there was great traffic in Chinese women, one of whom was kidnapped and carried off to San Diego. A reward of a hundred dollars was offered for her return, and she was brought back on a charge of theft and tried in the Court of Justice Trafford, on Temple Street near Spring. During the trial, on October 31, 1870, Warren and Dye fell into a dispute as to the reward; and the quarrel was renewed outside the courtroom. At a spot near the corner of Spring and Temple streets Dye shot and killed Warren; and in the scrimmage several other persons standing near were wounded. Dye was tried, but acquitted. Dye won an acquittal but the disposition of the reward is unknown.

== Sources ==
- Secrest; William B.; Lawmen & Desperadoes: a compendium of noted, early California peace officers, badmen and outlaws, 1850-1900, A.H. Clark Co., 1994.
- Secrest; William B.; California Badmen: Mean Men with Guns, Quill Driver Books, Sanger, CA., 2007
