= Juan José Carrillo =

American politician (1842–1916)

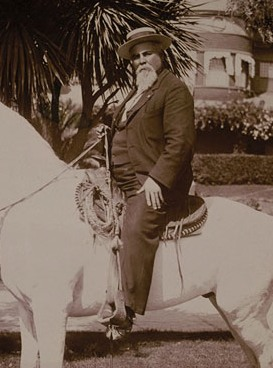

Mayor of Santa Monica
- In office 1890–1897

Santa Monica City Trustee
- In office 1888–1898

City Marshal of Los Angeles
- In office 1875–1876

Personal details
- Born: September 8, 1842 Santa Barbara, California, Mexico
- Died: March 30, 1916 (aged 73) Los Angeles, California, US
- Spouse(s): Francisca Roland, m. 1869; Eva Carrillo
- Profession: Judge, politician

Juan José Carrillo (September 8, 1842 – March 30, 1916), was a Californio politician and judge, who served as Mayor of Santa Monica and as the last City Marshal of Los Angeles.

== Biography ==
Carrillo was born in Santa Barbara to Pedro Carlos Antonio Carrillo (1818–1888) and Maria Josefa Bandini (1823–1896). He was a member of the Carrillo family of California, a prominent Californio family. His mother was one of three Bandini sisters; Maria Josefa, Ysidora, and Arcadia. His grandfather Carlos Antonio Carrillo (1783–1852) was Governor of Alta California from 1837 to 1838. Juan's great uncle, José Antonio Carrillo, was a three time mayor of Los Angeles and a hero of the Californios during the Mexican–American War.

From 1852 to 1858, Juan and his brother were educated in Boston, returning to California in 1858. In 1864 Carrillo came to Los Angeles and worked for the grocery firm of Samuel B. Caswell, John T. Ellis, and John H. Wright. Carrillo was Los Angeles City Marshal from 1875 to 1876.

In 1881 Carrillo moved to Santa Monica. He acted for a time as agent for his aunt, Arcadia Bandini de Stearns Baker. In 1884 Arcadia Baker deeded the site of Woodlawn cemetery to him and he in turn, without compensation, deeded the same to the city. In 1888 he was elected as Santa Monica City trustee and served till 1898 - longer than any other trustee. From 1890 to 1897, he was president of the board and thus acting mayor of the city. After his retirement from the council he served two years as superintendent of streets, from 1904 to 1906, and a police judge in Santa Monica from 1905 to 1915.

== Personal life ==
Carrillo married Francisca Roland (1849–1897) in 1869, and together had eleven children. His son was the actor Leo Carrillo. Carrillo had four sons and three daughters with his second wife, Eva Van Vusker Carrillo.
