= Nat Trives =

American politician (born 1934)

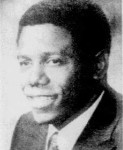

Mayor of Santa Monica, California
- In office 1975–1977
- Preceded by: Clo Hoover
- Succeeded by: Donna O'Brien Swink

Santa Monica City Council
- In office 1971–1979

Personal details
- Born: Nathaniel Trives; 1934 (age 91–92) Birmingham, Alabama

Nathaniel Trives (born 1934) is an American politician who served as the first African-American mayor of Santa Monica, California, a town then 95 percent white. Trives is a former Santa Monica police officer who served on the Santa Monica City Council from 1971 to 1979. His is professor emeritus of Santa Monica College and California State University, Los Angeles.

== Early life and education ==
Trives was born in Birmingham, Alabama in 1934, the son of Oscar Trives and Lillie Bell Blakley. At an early age, his parents divorced, and he moved with his mother to Richmond, Indiana, where she met and married James Bart Blakley on December 15, 1938. He and his siblings were raised by his mother and stepfather in Indiana and Ohio. He has two brothers, Ben and Bart, and three sisters, Rachel, Joyce, and Carol. His father worked in commercial real estate.

In the spring of 1949, his family relocated to Santa Monica. Trives attended Lincoln Jr. High (today Lincoln Middle School), and Santa Monica High School, where he graduated in 1952.

Trives attended Santa Monica College, where he received an Associate's Degree in Criminal Justice in 1954. Trives received his B.S. in criminal justice from Cal State Los Angeles and Master of Public Administration from UCLA.

== Career ==
After college, Trives served on the Santa Monica Police Department achieving the rank of sergeant and served as president of the Santa Monica Police Officers Association for five years.

He was elected to the Santa Monica City Council in 1971 and re-elected in 1975. He served as mayor pro tem from 1973-1975 and mayor from 1975-77. While mayor, he diversified the administration adding minorities to every board and commission and saved the Santa Monica Pier from demolition.

In the late 1970s, he was named a special master and auditor monitor at the US Federal Court for the Northern District of California flying to San Francisco during the week.

For two decades, Trives served on the faculty of Santa Monica College.

Trives is professor emeritus of criminal justice at Cal State LA.

== Community ==
For many years, Trives served as the board chair of Crossroads School in Santa Monica.

He serves on the President's Council of California State University, Los Angeles.

== Personal ==
In 1955 he married Ida Trives at the First Baptist Church in Venice, California. they had one daughter, Toni.

== Awards and honors ==
- 1999—Edmund G. "Pat" Brown Institute of Public Affairs Award
- 2012—Bahai Global Justice Award
- 2015—Mark J. Benjamin Community Impact Award
- 2024—Albert Nelson Marquis Lifetime Achievement Award from Marquis Who's Who.

== See also ==
- List of first African-American mayors
- African American mayors in California
