= Ruth Y. Goldway =

American Postal Regulatory Committee chairwoman

Ruth Goldway
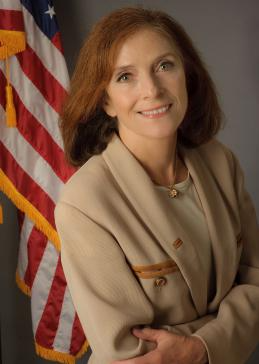

Chairwoman of the Postal Regulatory Commission
- In office August 6, 2009 – December 3, 2014
- Preceded by: Dan Blair
- Succeeded by: Robert G. Taub

Personal details
- Born: September 17, 1945 (age 81) New York City, New York
- Party: Democratic
- Education: University of Michigan (BA); Wayne State University (MA)

Ruth Yannatta Goldway (born September 17, 1945) is a member of the Postal Regulatory Commission, and served as its chairman from 2009 to 2014.

== Early life and career ==
Goldway was born September 17, 1945, in New York City. After graduating from the Bronx High School of Science, she attended the University of Michigan and Wayne State University where she earned a Bachelor of Arts and Master of Arts in English literature respectively.

She is on the board of TreePeople and New Visions Foundation. She is a founder and co-chair of Women in Logistics and Delivery Services (WILDS), a networking and mentoring organization. Goldway has lectured on the role of women in government, Finnish culture and society, urban planning, and consumerism at universities and professional associations throughout the United States, Europe, Australia and Japan. She was assistant to the director of California's Department of Consumer Affairs during the 1970s. She was elected council member and mayor of the city of Santa Monica from 1979 to 1983. She helped to found California's system of statewide farmers markets and expanded citizen representation on state regulatory boards. She served as Founder and Chairperson of the Santa Monica Pier Restoration Corporation from 1983 to 1994.

Goldway served as director of public affairs at California State University, Los Angeles. From 1991 to 1994 she served as manager of public affairs for the Getty Trust, the largest arts and education foundation in the U.S.

In Finland, from 1994 to 1997, as the then-spouse of U.S. Ambassador Derek Shearer, she authored several articles that appeared in the Finnish magazine Gloria, organized seminars on women's issues and assisted in the promotion of American products and services. Her memoirs of her experiences there, Letters from Finland, were translated and published in Finland by Otava Oy in November, 1998. In 1993, Goldway played the part of the Education Secretary in the film "Dave".

== Postal Regulatory Commission ==
She was first appointed by President Bill Clinton in April 1998, and reappointed in 2002 and 2008 by President George W. Bush to serve until 2014. She was selected as chairman by President Barack Obama on August 6, 2009.

Goldway is currently the longest serving Senate-confirmed presidential appointee in a full-time political position in the executive branch of the United States Government. She has written on postal matters for national newspapers and submitted congressional testimony. Goldway is widely credited for persuading the United States Postal Stamp Service to adopt the "Forever stamp," a stamp that will be valid forever when purchased at the going first-class rate. She has advocated for wider availability of Vote by Mail and national access to no-excuse absentee ballots in federal elections. She has also advocated for the large-scale adoption of electric vehicles for mail delivery.

As chairman, Goldway presided during a time marked by a record caseload and the implementation of new postal laws and regulations. On her watch, the commission issued a number of major decisions including the first Exigency Rate Case, the first Non-Compliance Determination, and Advisory Opinions on Post Office Station and Branch Closings, and on Five Day Mail Delivery. She established a series of monthly commission public meetings, which are webcast, and initiated the publication of a quarterly report on rate and service inquiries. The commission has responded to hundreds of Postal Service proposals including Rate Requests, Market Tests and Experimental Products and Negotiated Service Agreements, and has carried out its statutory international responsibilities.

In October 2012, Goldway received a National Consumer Excellence Award for her contributions to the protection of postal consumers from the organization Consumer Action.
