= Postal Regulatory Commission =

US regulatory agency

United States Postal Regulatory Commission

Agency overview
- Formed: 1970
- Headquarters: 901 New York Avenue NW Suite #200 Washington, D.C.
- Employees: 65
- Annual budget: $15 m
- Agency executives: Vacant, Chairman; Robert G. Taub, Vice Chairman
- Website: www.prc.gov

The United States Postal Regulatory Commission (or PRC), formerly called the Postal Rate Commission, is an independent regulatory agency created by the Postal Reorganization Act of 1970. Like the Postal Service, it was defined in law as an independent establishment of the executive branch.

== History ==
=== Postal Rate Commission ===
The Postal Reorganization Act of 1970 created the PRC—originally named the Postal Rate Commission—to set the rates for different classes of mail by holding hearings on rates proposed by the United States Postal Service (USPS).

From 1970 through 2006, the PRC also had oversight authority over the USPS in areas besides rates changes. Specifically, that additional oversight consisted of conducting public, on-the-record hearings concerning proposed mail classification or major service changes and of recommending actions to be taken by the postal Governors.

=== Postal Regulatory Commission ===
The Postal Accountability and Enhancement Act of 2006 (Public Law 109-435) enacted on December 20, 2006, made several changes to the Postal Regulatory Commission. Besides giving the body its current name, the Postal Accountability and Enhancement Act significantly strengthened the Commission's authority to serve as a counterbalance to new flexibility granted to the USPS in setting postal rates.

The Postal Accountability and Enhancement Act requires the Postal Regulatory Commission to develop and maintain regulations for a modern system of rate regulation, consult with the Postal Service on delivery service standards and performance measures, consult with the Department of State on international postal policies, prevent cross-subsidization or other anti-competitive postal practices, promote transparency and accountability, and adjudicate complaints.

The law also assigns new and continuing oversight responsibilities to the Postal Regulatory Commission, including annual determinations of USPS compliance with applicable laws, development of accounting practices and procedures for the Postal Service, review of the Universal Service requirement, and assurance of transparency through periodic reports. New enforcement tools given to the PRC include subpoena power, authority to direct the Postal Service to adjust rates and to take other remedial actions, and levying fines in cases of deliberate noncompliance with applicable postal laws.

==== Retiree Health Benefits Fund ====
According to the Postal Accountability and Enhancement Act, the United States Postal Service must make annual payments of between $5.4 billion and $5.8 billion to the Postal Service Retiree Health Benefits Fund from 2007. This provision of the law has been highly controversial, as no other federal agency is required to pre-fund future retirees' health benefits in this manner. The consequences of this funding requirement have been blamed for the perilous financial condition of the Postal Service, but no consensus has been reached on its fiscal effects, given other contributors such as stiff competition and other economic circumstances.

In June 2011, the United States Postal Service had to suspend its weekly payment of $115 million into the fund because it had reached $8 billion in debt and the retirement plan had a surplus of $6.9 billion.

== Composition ==
The PRC is composed of five Commissioners—each of whom is appointed to a six-year term of office by the President and confirmed by the Senate, similar to many other high-level Executive Branch office holders. As with Postal Governors, PRC commissioners are permitted to serve for one additional "holdover" year beyond the end of their term if a replacement has not been nominated and confirmed. The President designates one Commissioner as Chairman of the Commission. The Commissioners together designate one of their number as a Vice chairman for a one-year term. No more than three of the Commissioners can be from any one political party.

=== Current commissioners ===
The commissioners as of September 29, 2026 are:

Position	Name	Party	Joined	Term expires
Chairman	Vacant	—N/a	—	November 22, 2026
Vice chairman	Robert G. Taub	Republican	October 8, 2011	October 14, 2028
Member	Ann C. Fisher	Republican	August 8, 2019	October 14, 2030
Member	Ashley E. Poling	Democratic	August 8, 2019	November 22, 2030
Member	Thomas G. Day	Independent	October 12, 2023	October 14, 2028

=== Nominations ===
President Trump has nominated the following to fill a seat on the commission. They await Senate confirmation.

Name	Party	Term expires	Replacing
Jeffrey Zisk	Republican	November 22, 2026	Michael Kubayanda
Jeffrey Zisk	Republican	November 22, 2032	Reappointment

=== Offices ===
The PRC is organized into five operating offices: Accountability and Compliance, General Counsel, Public Affairs and Government Relations, Secretary, and Inspector General.

== Past commissioners and chairmen ==
Name	Position	Party	Term started	Term expired
Howard Elliott	Commissioners	Republican	November 23, 1970	February 28, 1973
William J. Crowley	Chairman	Republican	October 15, 1970	May 1, 1973
John L. Ryan	Commissioner	Republican	November 23, 1970	August 3, 1970
John L. Ryan	Chairman	Republican	August 4, 1973	October 31, 1973
Rod Kreger	Commissioner	Republican	August 6, 1973	January 7, 1974
Nathan A. Baily	Commissioner	Democratic	October 15, 1970	October 14, 1974
Fred B. Rhodes	Chairman	Republican	January 18, 1974	December 30, 1974
Paul A. Miltich	Commissioner	Republican	March 13, 1975	March 7, 1977
Frank P. Saponaro	Commissioner	Independent	October 15, 1970	October 14, 1977
Carlos C. Villarreal	Commissioner	Republican	April 15, 1973	February 1, 1979
Kieran O'Doherty	Commissioner	Conservative	February 20, 1975	October 14, 1980
A. Lee Fritschler	Chairman	Democratic	July 31, 1979	March 4, 1981
A. Lee Fritschler	Commissioner	Democratic	March 5, 1981	August 31, 1981
Clyde S. DuPont	Commissioner	Republican	September 20, 1974	March 13, 1975
Clyde S. DuPont	Chairman	Republican	March 14, 1975	July 29, 1979
Clyde S. DuPont	Commissioner	Republican	July 30, 1979	September 14, 1981
Simeon M. Bright	Commissioner	Democratic	December 15, 1977	October 12, 1984
James H. Duffy	Commissioner	Democratic	May 11, 1979	September 11, 1985
Henrietta F. Guiton	Commissioner	Democratic	December 20, 1984	June 19, 1987
Janet D. Steiger	Commissioner	Republican	October 15, 1980	February 2, 1982
Janet D. Steiger	Chairman	Republican	February 3, 1982	August 10, 1989
Patti Birge. Tyson	Commissioner	Democratic	September 12, 1985	November 22, 1991
Henry R. Folsom	Commissioner	Republican	March 9, 1982	December 29, 1992
John Crutcher	Commissioner	Republican	March 9, 1982	October 14, 1993
Wayne A. Schley	Commissioner	Republican	December 30, 1992	October 14, 1995
Edward H. Quick	Commissioner	Democratic	December 2, 1991	November 22, 1997
George W. Haley	Chairman	Republican	February 14, 1990	October 14, 1993
George W. Haley	Commissioner	Republican	December 1, 1993	September 10, 1998
Edward J. Gleiman	Chairman	Independent	February 23, 1994	February 2, 2001
W.H. "Trey" LeBlanc	Commissioner	Democratic	November 24, 1987	November 22, 2001
Dana B. "Danny" Covington	Commissioner	Republican	November 2, 1998	October 14, 2005
George A. Omas	Commissioner	Republican	August 8, 1997	November 29, 2001
George A. Omas	Chairman	Republican	November 30, 2001	December 9, 2006
Dawn Tisdale	Commissioner	Democratic	December 1, 2004	November 22, 2007
Dan Gregory Blair	Chairman	Republican	December 9, 2006	August 5, 2009
Dan Gregory Blair	Commissioner	Republican	August 6, 2009	June 30, 2011
Ruth Y. Goldway	Commissioner	Democratic	April 15, 1998	August 5, 2009
Ruth Y. Goldway	Chairwoman	Democratic	August 6, 2009	December 3, 2014
Ruth Y. Goldway	Commissioner	Democratic	December 4, 2014	November 22, 2015
Tony Hammond	Commissioner	Republican	August 6, 2002	October 7, 2011
Tony Hammond	Commissioner	Republican	April 30, 2012	October 14, 2013
Tony Hammond	Commissioner	Republican	December 10, 2014	August 7, 2019
Nanci E. Langley	Commissioner	Democratic	June 9, 2008	November 22, 2013
Nanci E. Langley	Commissioner	Democratic	December 10, 2014	August 7, 2019
Mark D. Acton	Commissioner	Republican	August 17, 2006	October 5, 2023
Michael M. Kubayanda	Commissioner	Democratic	January 15, 2019	January 19, 2021
Michael M. Kubayanda	Chairman	Democratic	January 20, 2021	October 3, 2025

=== Office of Accountability & Compliance ===
The Office of Accountability & Compliance (OAC) provides analytic support to the Commission for the review of various Postal Service proposed actions: rate changes, negotiated service agreements (NSAs), classification of products and services, the Annual Compliance Determination, the Annual Report to President and Congress, changes to postal services, post office closings and other issues before the Commission. Areas of expertise include economic and econometric analysis, analysis of operational characteristics of the postal system, analysis of Postal Service operating costs and cost methodologies. OAC also collects, analyzes and periodically summarizes financial and various other statistical information to support Commission responsibilities.

=== Office of General Counsel ===
The Office of General Counsel provides legal assistance on matters involving the Commission's responsibilities; defends Commission decisions before the courts; and advises the Commission on the legal aspects of proposed legislation, rulemaking, and policies on procurement, contracting, personnel matters, ethics, and other internal legal matters.

=== Office of Public Affairs & Government Relations ===
The Office of Public Affairs & Government Relations (PAGR) manages communications and public outreach for the Commission with the public, Members of Congress, the Postal Service, state and local governments, and the news media. PAGR engages in public outreach, responds to media inquiries and disseminates information concerning Commission decisions and activities to the public. PAGR also provides information to postal customers and assists in the resolution of informal complaints, called "rate and service inquiries", from members of the public.

=== Office of Secretary & Administration ===
The Office of Secretary & Administration records and preserves PRC actions and documents, manages the dockets, reference materials, and interagency reporting. It also helps to manage the administrative aspects of the PRC, including budgeting and accounting, strategic planning, contracting, human resources and personnel, and serves as a point of contact for audits. It also manages facilities and infrastructure, and provides support services.

=== Office of Inspector General ===
The Office of Inspector General is a watchdog office that seeks out fraud, waste and abuse in the PRC programs and operations, and conducts audits of programs to identify areas of potential improvement. The Office of Inspector General also investigates allegations and complaints.

=== Public Representative ===
The law (39 U.S.C. 505) requires that the Commission designate an individual to represent the interest of the general public in every public proceeding. This obligation is likely unique in the federal government, although state-level public utility commissions have similar arrangements. Since 2007, the Commission has used the method of appointing a staff member, on a case-by-case basis, to represent the public interest before the Commission for the duration of that particular case. This appointee is called the Public Representative. The Public Representative can obtain legal or technical support if necessary to fulfill that responsibility, but no one working in the Public Representative role can participate in the Commission's decision-making process.

== See also ==
- Board of Governors of the United States Postal Service
- History of United States postage rates
