= Leo Carrillo =

American actor, vaudevillian, political cartoonist, and conservationist (1881–1961)

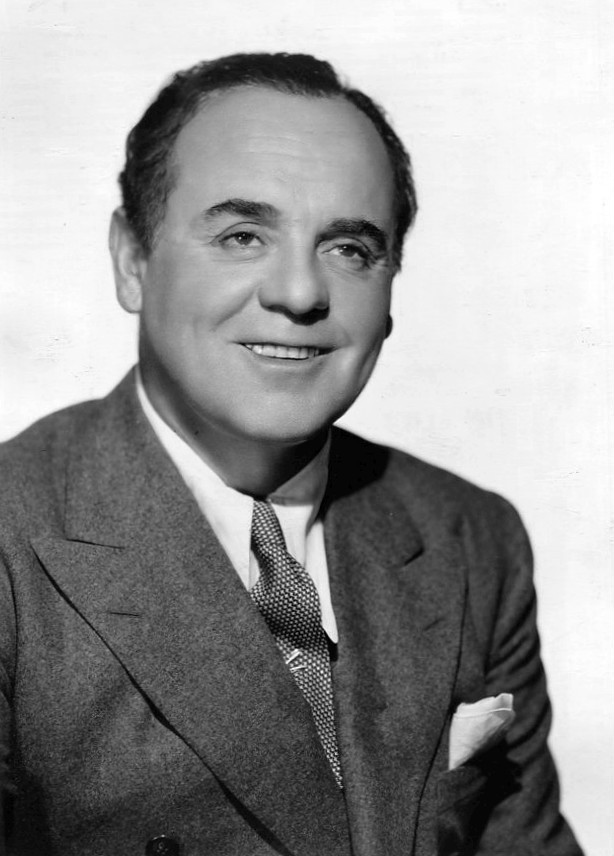
- Carrillo in 1934
- Born: Leopoldo Antonio Carrillo; August 6, 1880; Los Angeles, California, U.S.
- Died: September 10, 1961 (aged 81); Santa Monica, California, U.S.
- Resting place: Woodlawn Memorial Cemetery
- Occupations: Actor; Vaudevillian; Political cartoonist; Conservationist
- Years active: 1915–1957
- Political party: Republican
- Spouse: Edith Haeselbarth (m. 1913; died 1953)
- Children: 1

Leopoldo Antonio Carrillo (Spanish pronunciation: [ka'riʎo]; (Note: Carrillo's autobiography phonetically spelled what his family considered the correct Castilian pronunciation: "The name is pronounced "Cay-reel-yo"' with a liquid Castilian double "l". It is not pronounced "Care-reeyo" with the "y" for double "l" as in Mexico. The Mexican adaptation of Spanish is a beautiful variation in itself, but we of Castilian lineage prefer the original liquid sound for the double "l". It is part of our heritage.") August 6, 1880 – September 10, 1961) was an American actor, vaudevillian, political cartoonist, and conservationist. He was notable for playing Pancho in the television series The Cisco Kid (1950–1956) and in several films.

== Biography ==
=== Family roots ===
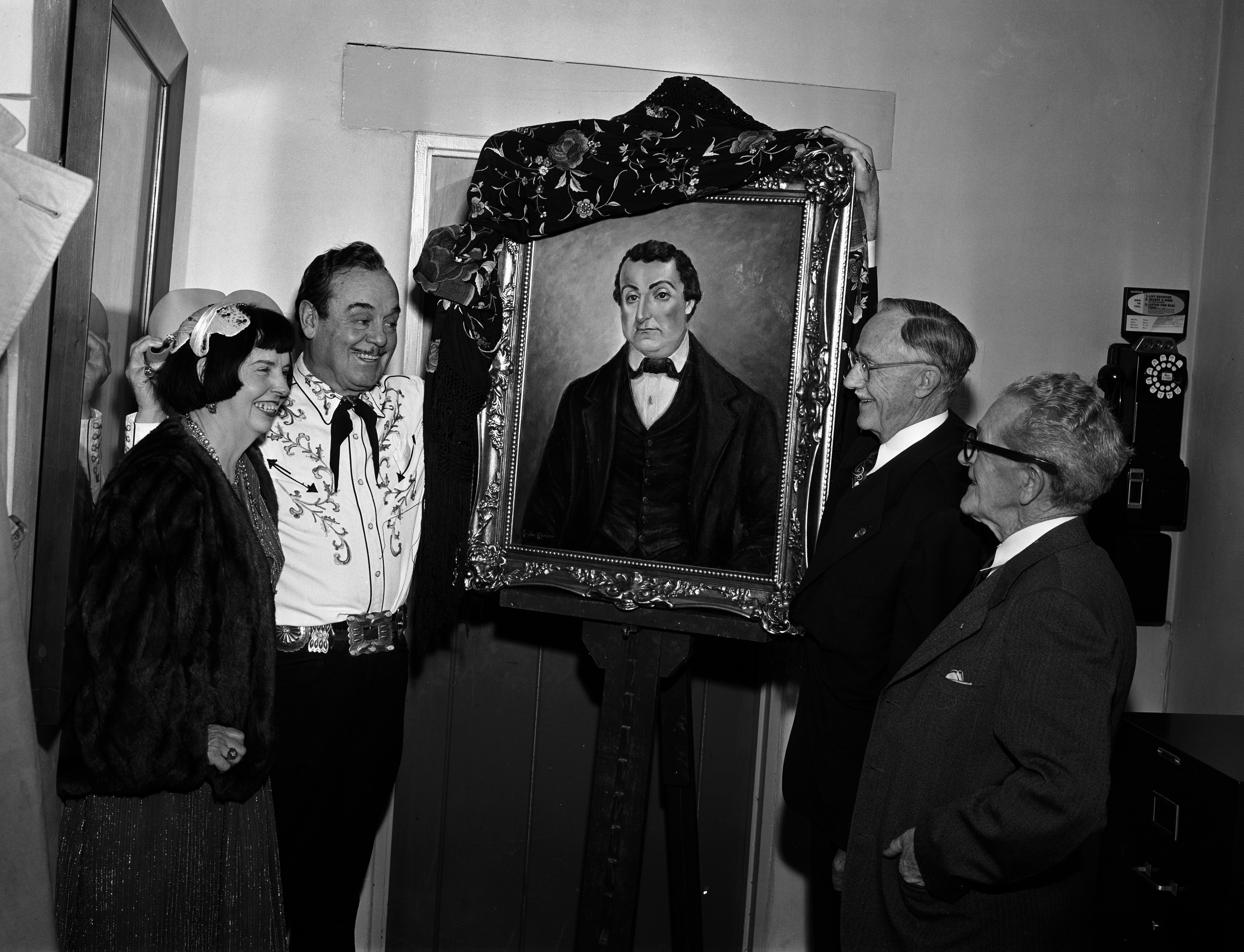
Leo Carillo unveils portrait of his great-uncle José Antonio Carrillo, 1955

Leo Carrillo was a member of the Carrillo family of California, a prominent Californio family, and traced his ancestry through California, Mexico, and Spain to the year 1260. His great-great grandfather José Raimundo Carrillo (1749–1809), was a soldier in the Spanish Portolá expedition colonization of Las Californias, arriving in San Diego on July 1, 1769. Franciscan Friar Junípero Serra performed the marriage ceremony for Don Jose Raimundo and Tomasa Ignacia Lugo in 1781. His great-grandfather Carlos Antonio Carrillo (1783–1852) was governor of Alta California (1837–38). His great-uncle, José Antonio Carrillo, was a three-time mayor of Los Angeles and twice married to sisters of Governor Pío Pico. His paternal grandfather, Pedro Carrillo, who was educated in Boston, was a writer.

=== Early history ===
The family moved from San Diego to Los Angeles then to Santa Monica, where Carrillo's father, Juan José Carrillo (1842–1916), served as the city's police chief and later the first mayor. His cousin was Broadway star William Gaxton (real name Arturo Antonio Gaxiola). Proud of his heritage, Carrillo wrote the book The California I Love, published shortly before his death in 1961.

=== Career ===
A university graduate, Carrillo worked as a newspaper cartoonist for the San Francisco Examiner, then turned to acting on Broadway. In Hollywood, he appeared in more than 90 films, often as a dialect specialist—although in real life, he had a baritone speaking voice without a trace of an accent. He usually used the dialect for comic effect, liberally salting his speech with malaprops: "My ears, they are para-loused!" or "Why you wanna put your dirty face in my horse's water? I got a healthy horse and you put Germans in the water!" When his screen character left any scene, Carrillo always exclaimed, "Let's went!"

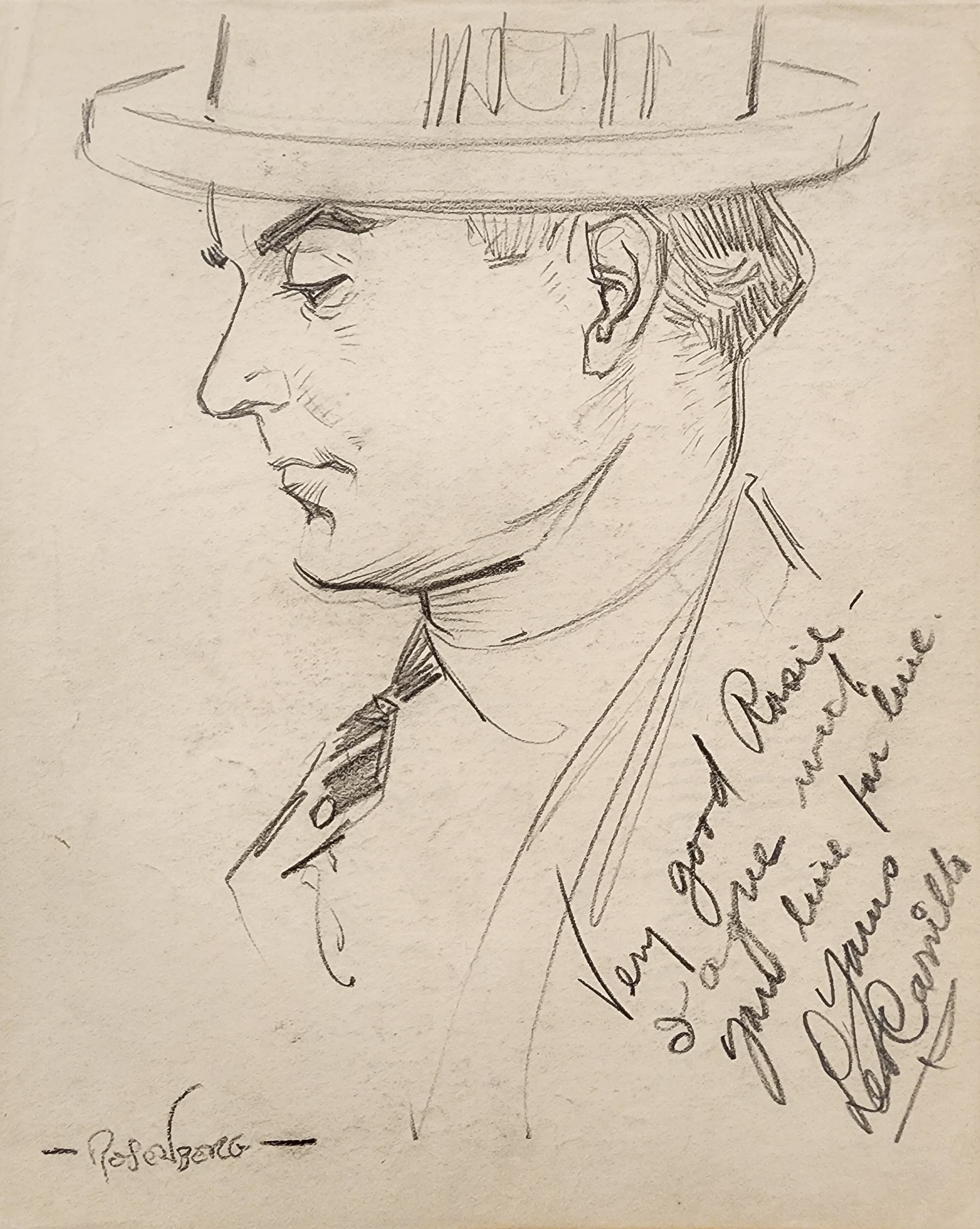
Leo Carrillo autographed drawing by Manuel Rosenberg for the Cincinnati Post, 1926

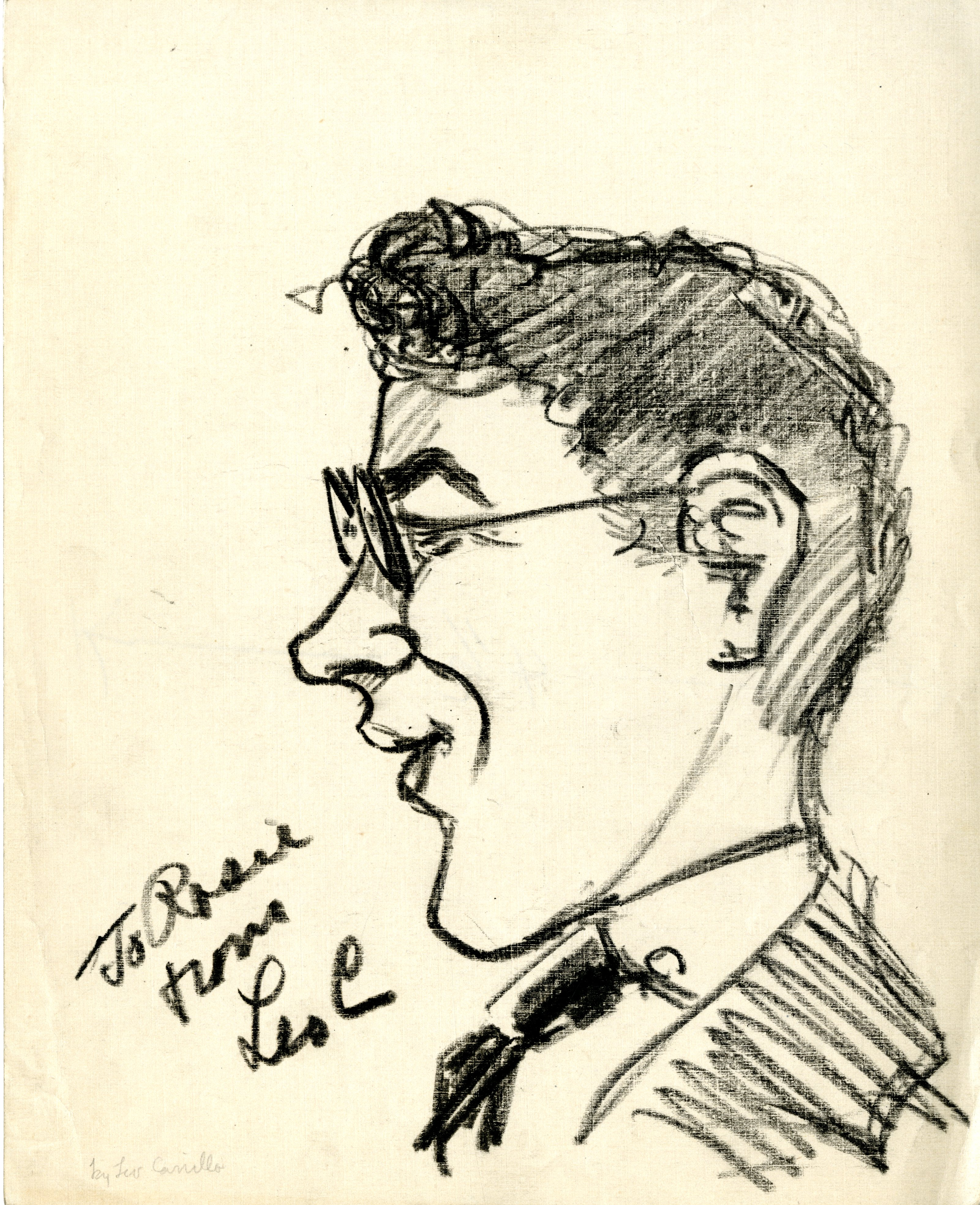
Signed portrait of "Rosie" Manuel Rosenberg by Leo Carrillo 1922

Leo Carrillo could play sympathetic and villainous roles with equal skill. In 1951, he took the starring role in the feature film Pancho Villa Returns, which was filmed in both English- and Spanish-dialogue versions. However, he is best remembered as Pancho, good-natured sidekick of the Cisco Kid, opposite Duncan Renaldo as Cisco. Renaldo and Carrillo were teamed for a series of feature films in 1949, and then for a syndicated television series that ran from 1950 until 1956. The Cisco Kid was notable as the first TV series filmed in color. After The Cisco Kid ended production, Carrillo appeared in the episode "Rescue at Sea" of the syndicated military drama Men of Annapolis.

== Civic contributions ==
Carrillo was a preservationist and conservationist of long standing. When a film crew did location filming in Hilo, Hawaii, in 1933, the city named one of its stately banyan trees in Carrillo's honor; the "Leo Carrillo tree" still stands there today.

Carrillo served on the California Beach and Parks commission for 18 years and played a key role in the state's acquisition of Hearst Castle at San Simeon, Los Angeles Arboretum, and Anza-Borrego Desert State Park. He eventually was made a goodwill ambassador by the California governor at the time.

As a result of his service to California, west of Malibu, California on CA-1 Pacific Coast Highway, a 1.5-mile beach is named Leo Carrillo State Park in his honor. The City of Westminster, California, named an elementary school for him. Leo Carrillo Ranch Historic Park, originally Rancho de los Kiotes, in Carlsbad, California, is a registered California Historical Site. Rancho Carrillo Trail, also in Carlsbad, is named for Leo Carrillo.

== Political views ==
In the early days of World War II, Carrillo advocated for the removal of all Japanese Americans from the West Coast. In a telegram to Congressman Leland Ford that received extensive coverage, Carrillo wrote:

I travel every week through a hundred miles of Japanese shacks on the way to my ranch, and it seems that every farmhouse is located on some strategic elevated point. Let's get them off the coast and into the interior. You know and I know the Japanese situation in California. The eastern people are not conscious of this menace. May I urge you in behalf of the safety of the people of California to start action at once.

Carrillo was a Republican. In 1944, for instance, he performed a "Wild West" act at the massive rally organized by David O. Selznick in the Los Angeles Coliseum in support of the Dewey-Bricker ticket, as well as Governor Earl Warren of California, who became Dewey's running mate in 1948 and later the Chief Justice of the United States. The gathering drew 93,000, with Cecil B. DeMille as the master of ceremonies and with short speeches by Hedda Hopper and Walt Disney. Among the others in attendance were Ann Sothern, Ginger Rogers, Randolph Scott, Adolphe Menjou, Gary Cooper, Edward Arnold, William Bendix, and Walter Pidgeon.

== Personal life ==
In 1905, Carrillo married Edith Shakespeare Haeselbarth of Nyack, New York, whom he met backstage at the New York City theater where she had seen him perform. They remained together until her death in 1953. They lived in Los Alisos on Channel Road, in Santa Monica Canyon. The Carrillos had one child, a daughter, Marie Antoinette. They spent part of their time at their 4,500-acre (1,800 ha) ranch in Carlsbad, California. Carrillo frequently permitted Boy Scout groups to camp on the grounds.

== Death ==
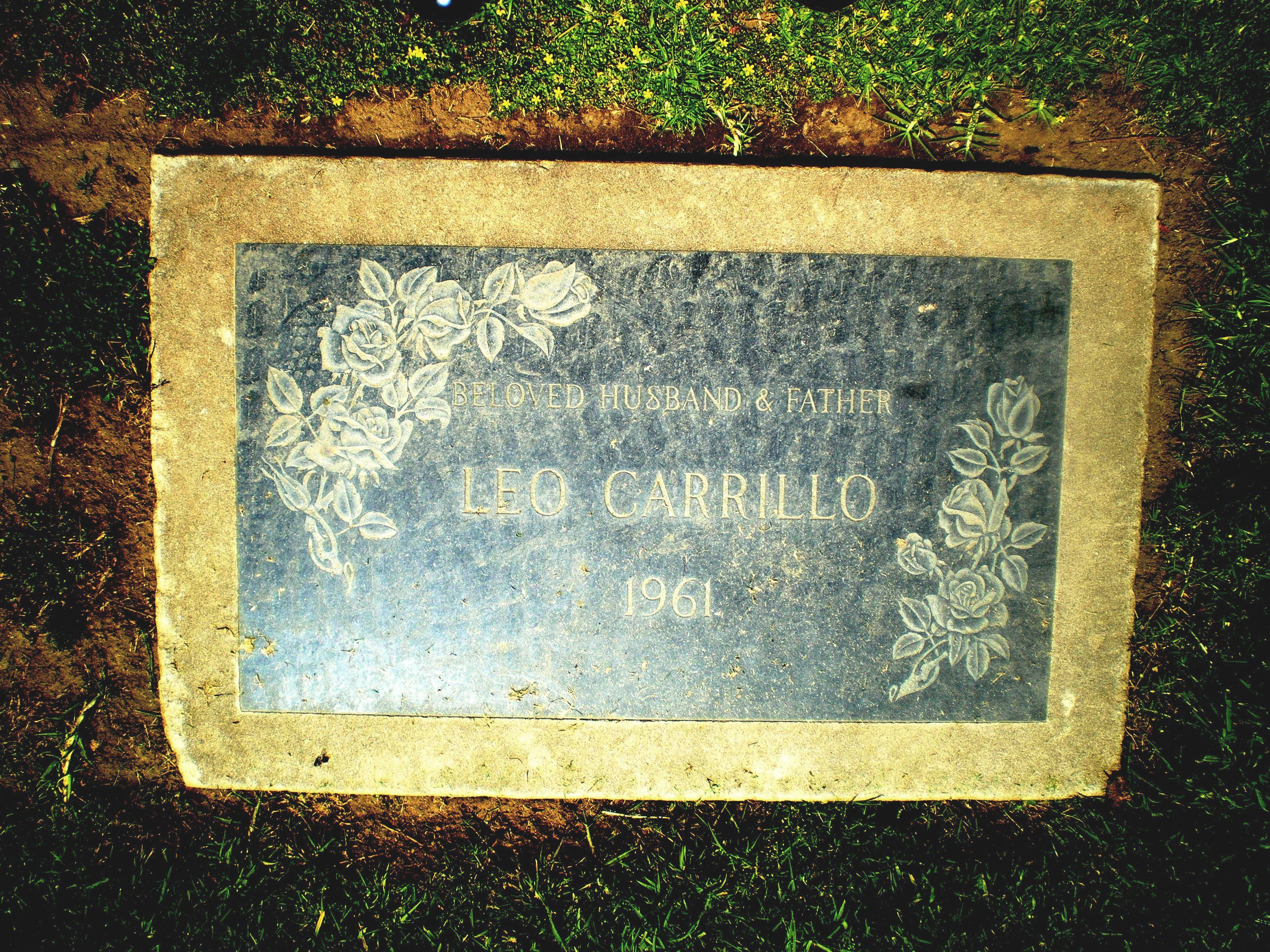
Leo Carillo Grave at Woodlawn Memorial Cemetery, Santa Monica

Leo Carrillo died of cancer on September 10, 1961, at the age of 81, and is interred at Santa Monica's Woodlawn Memorial Cemetery.

== Legacy ==
For his contributions to the film industry, Leo Carrillo has a motion pictures star on the Hollywood Walk of Fame at 1635 Vine Street, and a second star at 1517 Vine Street for his work in television. The star inspired the name of the character Horatio Carillo in the Netflix drama Narcos.

== See also ==
- Rancho De Los Kiotes (Leo Carrillo Ranch Historic Park)
- Leo Carrillo State Park
