= Mayichi =

Spanish gamer and Twitch streamer

- Born: Maite Carrillo; 13 November 1993 (age 32); Barcelona, Spain
- Occupations: Gamer, Twitch streamer

Twitch information
- Channel: mayichi
- Followers: 1.7 million
- Last updated: 19 June 2026

Maite Carrillo (born 13 November 1993), known professionally as Mayichi, is a Spanish gamer and Twitch streamer. She is best known for her gaming livestreams on Twitch. According to MónTerrassa, in 2023, she was ranked as one of the top 50 Spanish-speaking streamers on the platform.
