= Ken Genser =

American politician

Ken Genser (November 11, 1950 – January 9, 2010) was mayor of Santa Monica, California, until he died in office. Genser also served on the Santa Monica City Council.

== Political career ==
Genser served as a member of the Santa Monica Planning Commission and Santa Monica City Council. He was described as an advocate for affordable housing and the restoration of the Santa Monica Pier. Genser served on the City Council from 1988 until his death in 2010, and he was elected to the mayorship in 1992, 2000, and 2008. At the time of his death, he was Santa Monica's longest-serving councilmember.

According to a 1990 Los Angeles Times article, Genser was an opponent of new real estate development. A 1993 Los Angeles Times article described Genser as being part of the "militant slow-growth faction" of the City Council. He was also reported to have been associated with the pro-renter faction in Santa Monica politics. John Gilderbloom described Genser as part of a progressive block of politicians that emerged in Santa Monica in the late 1980s who advanced a "progressive agenda" of controlling land use development through participatory democracy. According to Gilderbloom, Genser and his progressive colleagues would advance community interests by striking deals with developers to include community benefits.

Prior to his election to the City Council in 1988, Genser served as the Chair of Santa Monicans for Renters' Rights.
