= Dan Gregory Blair =

American nonprofit executive

Dan Gregory Blair currently serves as an independent senior consultant to the U.S. Agency for Global Media. Formerly, Blair served in senior positions in the nonprofit sector. He served as a senior counselor examining and recommending reforms on the presidential appointments process for the Center on Presidential Transition. He also served as Fellow and Senior Counselor at the Bipartisan Policy Center and led a task force of government and private sector management experts charged with examining government oversight issues. He also advises private sector clients on a broad array of government management and postal issues.

From July 2011 to January 2017, Blair led the National Academy of Public Administration, a congressionally chartered nonprofit whose mission is to improve public administration at the state, local and federal levels. Previously, he served as the first Chairman of the independent Postal Regulatory Commission, the successor agency to the former Postal Rate Commission. He was unanimously confirmed as a Commissioner of the former Postal Rate Commission on December 9, 2006 by the United States Senate and designated Chairman by President George W. Bush on December 15, 2006.

Blair served as deputy director and acting director at the U.S. Office of Personnel Management. He was nominated by President George W. Bush and confirmed by the U.S. Senate as OPM deputy director in 2002.

Formerly, Blair served in senior staff positions in the U.S. House of Representatives and Senate oversight committees. He received his bachelors of journalism and Juris Doctor degrees from the University of Missouri-Columbia.

== Biography ==
Blair was born and raised in Joplin, Missouri, and received a Bachelor of Journalism degree from the School of Journalism at the University of Missouri in 1981 and his Juris Doctor from the School of Law at the University of Missouri in 1984.

== Career ==
=== Early career ===
Prior to joining United States Office of Personnel Management (OPM), Blair served on Capitol Hill, having worked for nearly 17 years on the staffs of both House and Senate committees charged with postal and civil service oversight. From 1998 through 2001, Blair served as senior counsel to Senator Fred Thompson (R-TN) on the Senate Committee on Governmental Affairs. Blair was responsible for review of legislation and policy affecting the federal civil service, the USPS, federal budget process, government ethics, and federal lobbying reform. Prior to joining the Committee on Governmental Affairs, Blair served as Staff Director for the House of Representatives Subcommittee on the Postal Service. Blair was responsible for directing the Subcommittee's oversight of the USPS and directed the development of comprehensive postal reform legislation. Blair also served as Minority General Counsel for the House of Representatives Committee on Post Office and Civil Service.

=== Later career ===
Between 2001 and 2006, Blair was Deputy Director at OPM, and represented the agency on a number of important external initiatives and has been responsible for many internal reform efforts. Blair also headed OPM's effort to "fix the hiring process" for the Federal Government and actively sought ways to provide agencies with the human resources tools necessary to streamline and reform their processes. Blair also chaired OPM's outreach program to veterans through his work and meetings with veterans service organizations. In recognition of his sustained contribution to the field of public administration through public service, Blair was elected as a Fellow of the National Academy of Public Administration in 2008.

In addition, Blair served on the President's Council on Integrity and Efficiency, the federal council of Presidentially-appointed and Senate-confirmed Inspectors General and frequently worked with the Chief Human Capital Officers Council and federal agencies in helping implement the President's Management Agenda and in overseeing critical human capital reforms at the Department of Defense and the Department of Homeland Security. Blair represented OPM as a witness before U.S. Senate and U.S. House of Representatives committees on a variety of issues, including pension and health benefits liabilities affecting the U.S. Postal Service.
