= Los Angeles City Marshal =

Juan José Carrillo
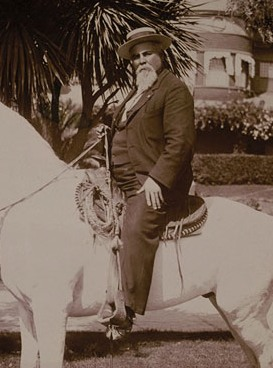
- Californio politician Juan José Carrillo served as the last City Marshal from 1875 to 1876.
- Other name: J.J. Carrillo
- Known for: Last Los Angeles City Marshal (1875–1876), Tax and Licence Collector, Chief of Police
- Police career
- Country: Los Angeles City Marshal's Office
- Allegiance: City of Los Angeles
- Department: Los Angeles City Marshal
- Service years: 1875–1876
- Rank: City Marshal, Chief of Police
- Other work: Tax and Licence Collector (1876–1877)

The Los Angeles City Marshal was the chief law enforcement officer of Los Angeles in the city's early years.

The City Marshal was an office created in 1850 upon the city's incorporation. The title was City Marshal, Tax and Licence Collector. The title of Chief of Police was added in 1871. In 1876 the position of City Marshal was eliminated. Jacob F. Gerkens as the first officer to hold the new title of Chief of Police. J.J. Carrillo continued as Tax and Licence Collector in 1876 - 1877.

The second City Marshal, Jack Whaling, was shot in 1853. This led to the creation of the "Los Angeles Rangers", a volunteer force who assisted the City Marshal and County Sheriff. At this time, law enforcement was limited and the Marshal had use of but one small county jail.

In 1869, William C. Warren was appointed as City Marshal and was given command over a force of six officers. He was responsible for being the city's dog catcher and collecting taxes. He was paid 2.5% of all tax monies he collected (in 1875 it totaled to $115 per month). In 1872, a city ordinance was passed which required the city marshal to register and license dogs.

Name	Tenure	Title	Notes
Samuel Whiting	1850	City Marshal, Tax and Licence Collector	
Alexander Gibson	1851	City Marshal, Tax and Licence Collector	
William Reeder	1852	City Marshal, Tax and Licence Collector	
A. S. Beard	1853	City Marshal, Tax and Licence Collector	^{[A]}
George W. Cole	1854	City Marshal	
Alfred Shelby	1855	City Marshal, Tax and Licence Collector	
William C. Getman	1856–1857	City Marshal, Tax and Licence Collector	^{[B]}
F. H. Alexander	1858–1859	City Marshal, Tax and Licence Collector	
Thomas Trafford	1860–1863	City Marshal, Tax and Licence Collector	
J. P. Owenby	1864	City Marshal, Tax and Licence Collector	
William C. Warren	1865–1867	City Marshal, Tax and Licence Collector	
John Trafford	1868	City Marshal, Tax and Licence Collector	
William C. Warren	1869–1870	City Marshal, Tax and Licence Collector	^{[C]}
Francis Baker	1871–1872	City Marshal, Tax and Licence Collector and Chief of Police	
R. J. Wolf	1873–1874	City Marshal, Tax and Licence Collector and Chief of Police	
Juan José Carrillo	1875–1876	City Marshal, Tax and Licence Collector and Chief of Police	

== Notes ==
- ^{A} Beard was removed from office.
- ^{B} Getman was killed in 1858 after being elected as sheriff of Los Angeles County.
- ^{C} Warren was shot and killed in 1870 by one of his deputies, Joseph Franklin Dye.

== Bibliography ==
- Bailey, William G. (1995). The Encyclopedia of Police Science. Routledge. ISBN 978-0-8153-1331-1.
- An illustrated history of Los Angeles County, California. Lewis Publishing Company, Chicago. 1889.
