= Carillo =

Carillo is a surname. Notable people with the surname include:

- Andrés Carillo (born 1980), Cuban fencer
- Frank Carillo (born 1950), American musician
- Luigi Carillo (born 1996), Italian footballer
- Maria Barbara Carillo (1625–1721), woman burned at the stake during the Spanish Inquisition
- Mario Carillo (1883–1958), Italian actor
- Mary Carillo (born 1957), American tennis player, writer, and sportscaster

== See also ==
- Carillo Gritti (1942–2016), Brazilian Roman Catholic bishop
- Carrillo (disambiguation)
