= Kevin McKeown (politician) =

American politician

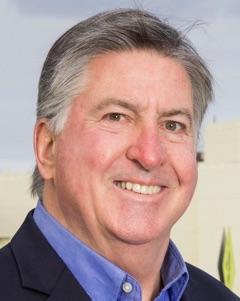
- McKeown at Santa Monica City Hall

Mayor / Councilmember Santa Monica
- In office December 8, 1998 – June 11, 2021

Personal details
- Born: January 6, 1948 (age 78) Bronxville, New York, U.S.
- Party: Democratic
- Website: www.mckeown.net

Kevin McKeown (born January 6, 1948) is an American politician who was twice (2015 and 2020) the Mayor of Santa Monica, California. He was elected to the Santa Monica City Council for six consecutive four-year terms, retiring at age 73 in June 2021. He was also a multi-term elected delegate to the Central Committee of the California Democratic Party, and remains a Party Caucus officer.

== Background ==
Kevin McKeown was born just north of New York City. His family moved to New Haven, CT, and he graduated from Suffield Academy in Suffield, CT at 16 and subsequently attended Yale. He was active at the campus radio station WYBC, beginning a career path that eventually led him to move to Santa Monica and become general manager of Los Angeles station KROQ in the late 1970s.

McKeown has been a Santa Monica renter in the same apartment since 1976. After leaving radio and advertising, he worked for 25 years as a Macintosh computer and educational technology consultant for the Santa Monica-Malibu Unified School District.

McKeown served on SMMUSD's technology advisory committee, the City of Santa Monica's Telecommunications Working Group, the steering committee of Santa Monicans for Renters’ Rights, and as chair of the Wilshire/Montana Neighborhood Coalition, before first being elected to City Council in 1998.

== Career as an elected official ==
McKeown served for parts of four decades (and two centuries). In six terms on the City Council, including being Mayor twice, McKeown focused on affordable housing, workers’ rights, and environmental sustainability. Among his accomplishments were greatly enhanced renter protections, a living wage for local workers, and converting Santa Monica to 100%-renewable electricity.

During his first term as Mayor of Santa Monica, he was an invited presenter at the COP21 United Nations Climate Change Conference in Paris. He is a long-standing advocate for single-payer healthcare.

McKeown represented Santa Monica as Chair of the Westside Cities Council of Governments, sat on the State of California's Santa Monica Bay Restoration Commission, and was chair of the Energy Committee on the Board of Directors of the Clean Power Alliance, a regional community-choice utility bringing 100% renewably sourced electricity to Santa Monica.

McKeown holds dual citizenship with the United States (by birth) and the Republic of Ireland (by descent). He is vice chair of the Irish-American Caucus of the California Democratic Party. He has twice (2010 and 2013) been named California Assembly District Democrat of the Year for the Santa Monica area.
