= Santa Monica City Council =

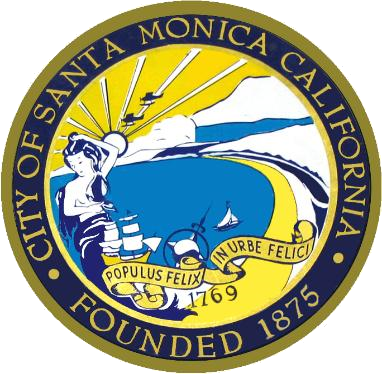

Type
- Type: Unicameral

Leadership
- Mayor: Caroline Torosis, Democratic
- Mayor Pro Tem: Jesse Zwick, Democratic

Structure
- Seats: 7
- Political groups: Officially nonpartisan: Democratic (7)
- Length of term: 4 Years

Elections
- Voting system: At-large districts
- Last election: November 5, 2024
- Next election: November 3, 2026

Meeting place
- Santa Monica City Hall, 1685 Main St, Santa Monica, CA, 90401

Website
- Official Website

The Santa Monica City Council is the legislative body of Santa Monica, California. The council consists of seven members elected at large to staggered four-year terms. It establishes municipal policies and priorities, adopts the city budget, enacts ordinances and appoints the city manager, city attorney and city clerk.

Santa Monica operates under a council–manager form of government. The mayor is not elected separately by the voters and does not serve as an independent municipal executive. Instead, the council selects a mayor and mayor pro tempore from among its seven members. The council normally meets on the second and fourth Tuesdays of each month.

== Organization and powers ==
Under the city charter, the council's seven members are elected at large for four-year terms. Terms begin on the first Tuesday following the election. A charter amendment approved by voters in 2018 limits a person to three council terms, whether consecutive or nonconsecutive; a partial term of more than two years counts as a term. The limitation applies prospectively to terms beginning on or after the 2018 election.

All municipal powers are vested in the council, subject to the city charter and the Constitution of California. Four members constitute a quorum, and most ordinances, resolutions and orders authorizing payments require at least four affirmative votes. The council sets city policy, establishes priorities, adopts and oversees the municipal budget and appoints the city manager, city attorney and city clerk.

=== Mayor ===
Following a municipal election in which councilmembers are elected, the council chooses one of its members to serve as its presiding officer with the title of Mayor of Santa Monica. The mayor has the same right to speak and vote as every other councilmember and is designated by the charter as the official head of the city for ceremonial purposes. The mayor may also perform duties assigned by the charter or by the council and serves in the position at the pleasure of the council.

As the council's presiding officer, the mayor chairs meetings, maintains order, presents questions for consideration, announces the results of votes and rules on procedural questions, subject to appeal to the full council. The mayor is also responsible for promoting compliance with the city's civility policy. The mayor may participate in debate and make or second motions while presiding. As one of the seven councilmembers, the mayor retains a vote on matters before the council and ordinarily votes last."

The office carries no independent veto or administrative authority. Municipal administration is conducted through the city manager, and the charter prohibits individual councilmembers—including the mayor—from directing city employees.

Section 602 of the city charter establishes base monthly compensation of $900 for the mayor and $750 for other councilmembers. These amounts are adjusted annually according to changes in the Consumer Price Index for the Los Angeles–Long Beach–Anaheim metropolitan area. The mayor and councilmembers may also receive employment benefits and reimbursement for authorized expenses incurred in performing their official duties.

Because Santa Monica uses a council manager system, the mayor is not a separately elected chief executive. Administrative responsibility is assigned to the city manager, while the mayor continues to serve as one of the seven voting councilmembers.

The charter does not prescribe a fixed one- or two-year mayoral term. Council selection practices have varied. In 2020, the council selected the mayor and mayor pro tempore for two-year terms. In 2022, it divided the two-year period between two mayors serving one year each while selecting a mayor pro tempore for two years.

=== Mayor pro tempore ===
The council also designates one of its members as Mayor Pro Tempore, commonly abbreviated as Mayor Pro Tem. Under the charter, the mayor pro tempore performs the mayor's duties during the mayor's absence or disability. The position does not carry separate executive authority, and its holder remains a voting member of the council.

As of 9 December 2025, Caroline Torosis is mayor and Jesse Zwick is mayor pro tempore. They were installed on December 9, 2025.

== Current council ==
District	Councilmember	Party (officially nonpartisan)
At large	Caroline Torosis (Mayor)	Democratic
At large	Jesse Zwick (Mayor Pro Tempore)	Democratic
At large	Dan Hall	Democratic
At large	Ellis Raskin	Democratic
At large	Barry Snell	Democratic
At large	Natalya Zernitskaya	Democratic
At large	Lana Negrete	Democratic

== Former councils ==
=== Charter ===
Council-Manager form of government, with seven Council members elected at-large. The new Charter was adopted in 1946.

Year	Council Members						
2024	Dan Hall	Ellis Raskin	Caroline Torosis	Jesse Zwick	Lana Negrete	Barry Snell	Natalya Zernitskaya
2022	Phil Brock	Oscar de la Torre	Caroline Torosis	Jesse Zwick	Lana Negrete	Christine Parra	Gleam Davis
2020	Phil Brock	Oscar de la Tore	Sue Himmelrich	Kristin McGowan	Kevin McKeown	Christine Parra	Gleam Davis
2018	Ted Winterer	Terry O'Day	Sue Himmelrich	Greg Morena	Kevin McKeown	Ana Maria Jara	Gleam Davis
2016	Ted Winterer	Terry O'Day	Sue Himmelrich	Pam O'Connor	Kevin McKeown	Antonio Vasquez	Gleam Davis
2014	Ted Winterer	Terry O'Day	Sue Himmelrich	Pam O'Connor	Kevin McKeown	Antonio Vasquez	Gleam Davis
2012	Ted Winterer	Terry O'Day	Robert Holbrook	Pam O'Connor	Kevin McKeown	Antonio Vasquez	Gleam Davis
2010	Richard Bloom	Terry O'Day	Robert Holbrook	Pam O'Connor	Kevin McKeown	Bobby Shriver	Gleam Davis
2008	Richard Bloom	Ken Genser	Robert Holbrook	Pam O'Connor	Kevin McKeown	Bobby Shriver	Gleam Davis
2006	Richard Bloom	Ken Genser	Robert Holbrook	Pam O'Connor	Kevin McKeown	Bobby Shriver	Herb Katz
2004	Richard Bloom	Ken Genser	Robert Holbrook	Pam O’Connor	Kevin McKeown	Bobby Shriver	Herb Katz
2002	Richard Bloom	Ken Genser	Robert Holbrook	Pam O'Connor	Kevin McKeown	Michael Feinstein	Herb Katz
2000	Richard Bloom	Ken Genser	Robert Holbrook	Pam O'Connor	Kevin McKeown	Michael Feinstein	Herb Katz
1998	Asha Greenberg	Ken Genser	Robert Holbrook	Pam O'Connor	Kevin McKeown	Michael Feinstein	Paul Rosenstein
1996	Asha Greenberg	Ken Genser	Robert Holbrook	Pam O'Connor	Ruth Ebner	Michael Feinstein	Paul Rosenstein
1994	Judy Abdo	Ken Genser	Robert Holbrook	Pam O'Connor	Ruth Ebner	Asha Greenberg	Paul Rosenstein
1992	Judy Abdo	Ken Genser	Robert Holbrook	Kelly Olsen	Antonio Vasquez	Asha Greenberg	Paul Rosenstein
1990	Judy Abdo	Ken Genser	Robert Holbrook	Dennis Zane	Antonio Vasquez	Kelly Olsen	Herb Katz
1988	Judy Abdo	Christine Reed	William H. Jennings	Dennis Zane	Ken Genser	David Finkel	Herb Katz
1986	James P. Conn	Christine Reed	William H. Jennings	Dennis Zane	Alan S. Katz	David Finkel	Herb Katz
1984	James P. Conn	Christine Reed	William H. Jennings	Dennis Zane	Ken Edwards	David Epstein	Herb Katz
1983	James P. Conn	Christine Reed	William H. Jennings	Dennis Zane	Ken Edwards	David G. Epstein	Delores M. Press
1981	James P. Conn	Christine Reed	William H. Jennings	Dennis Zane	Ken Edwards	Ruth Yannatta Goldway	Delores M. Press
1979	Perry Scott	Christine Reed	William H. Jennings	Donna O. Swink	John J. Bambrick	Ruth Yannatta Goldway	Peter van den Steenhoven
1977	Nathaniel Trives	Christine Reed	Donna O. Swink	Seymour A. Cohen	John J. Bambrick	Perry Scott	Pieter van den Steenhoven
1975	Nathaniel Trives	Christine Reed	Donna O. Swink	Seymour A. Cohen	Fred M. Judson	John W. McCloskey	Pieter van den Steenhoven
1973	Nathaniel Trives	Anthony L. Ditury	Donna O. Swink	Clo Hoover	Fred M. Judson	John W. McCloskey	Pieter van den Steenhoven
1971	Nathaniel Trives	Anthony L. Ditury	Virgil Kingsley	Clo Hoover	James B. Reidy, Jr.	John W. McCloskey	Robert Gabriel
1969	Herbert A. Spurgin	Anthony L. Ditury	Virgil Kingsley	Clo Hoover	James B. Reidy, Jr.	John W. McCloskey	Kenneth B. Wamsley
1967	Herbert A. Spurgin	Anthony L. Ditury	Wendell Corey	Clo Hoover	James G. Reidy, Jr.	Royal M. Sorensen	Kenneth B. Wamsley
1965	Herbert A. Spurgin	Rex H. Minter	Wendell Corey	Clo Hoover	James B. Reidy, Jr.	Royal M. Sorensen	Kenneth B. Wamsley
1963	Samuel C. Brown	Rex H. Minter	Martin Goodfriend	Clo Hoover	John M. Bohn	Howard B. Hamilton	Herbert A. Spurgin
1961	Samuel C. Brown	Rex H. Minter	Martin Goodfriend	Clo Hoover	William G. Thornsbury	Howard B. Hamilton	Thomas M. McCarthy
1959	Alys M. Drobnick	Rex H. Minter	Ben A. Barnard	Ralph S. Frantz	William G. Thornsbury	Wellman B. Mills	Thomas M. McCarthy
1957	Alys M. Drobnick	Rex H. Minter	Ralph S. Frantz	Russell K. Hart	Fred M. Judson	Wellman B. Mills	William G. Thornbury
1955	Jack J. Guercio	Rex H. Minter	Ben A. Barnard	Russell K. Hart	Fred M. Judson	Wellman B. Mills	Thomas M. McCarthy
1953	Jack J. Guercio	Thomas J. McDermott	Ben A. Barnard	James L. Grubbs	Louis E. Mahoney	Wellman B. Mills	Thomas M. McCarthy
1951	Jack J. Guercio	Thomas J. McDermott	Ben A. Barnard	James L. Grubbs	Louis E. Mahoney	Russell K. Hart	Thomas M. McCarthy
1949	Jack J. Guercio	Mark T. Gates	Ben A. Barnard	Cecil S. Dickinson	George A. Neilson	Russell K. Hart	Thomas M McCarthy
1947	Jack J. Guercio	Mark T. Gates	Ben A. Barnard	H. George Markworth	George A. Neilson	J. Lee Schimmer, Jr.	Edwin Talmadge

=== Second charter (1915–1946) ===
Commission form of government. Under the new charter, the City government now consisted of 3 departments: Public Safety, Public Works and Finance with one elected Commissioner responsible for each department. The City Council consisted of the three elected Commissioners. The Commissioner of the Department of Public Safety was the ex officio Mayor; and the elections process included the use of a preferential ballot form.

Year	Commissioners		
Year	Public Works	Public Safety	Finance
1945	William W. Milliken	Ray Schafer	Dwight C. Freeman
1943	William W. Milliken	Leonard J. Murray	Dwight C. Freeman
1941	William W. Milliken	Claude C. Crawford	Dwight C. Freeman
1939	William W. Milliken	Claude C. Crawford	Dwight C. Freeman
1937	William W. Milliken	Edmond S. Gillette	Theodore D. Plumer
1935	Hal Clark Sanborn	William H. Carter	Theodore D. Plumer
1933	Hal Clark Sanborn	William H. Carter	Theodore D. Plumer
1931	John A. Morton	William H. Carter	Frank A. Helton
1929	John A. Morton	Herman Michel	Frank A. Helton
1927	John A. Morton	Herman Michel	Frank A. Helton
1925	John A. Morton	John C. Steele	Frank A. Helton
1923	John A. Morton	John C. Steele	Frank A. Helton
1921	William H. Carter	Samuel L. Berkley	Frank A. Helton
1919	William H. Carter	Samuel L. Berkley	Frank J. Townsend
1917	William H. Carter	Samuel L. Berkley	Frank J. Townsend
1915	William H. Carter	Samuel L. Berkley	Maxwell K. Barretto

=== First charter (1906–1915) ===
Mayor - Council form of government. Under the new charter, the City Council was composed of one Mayor with veto power, and one Council member from each of its seven wards.

Year	Mayor	Council Member						
Year	Mayor	Ward 1	Ward 2	Ward 3	Ward 4	Ward 5	Ward 6	Ward 7
1915	-	-	-	-	-	-	-	-
1913	-	-	-	-	-	-	-	-
1909	-	-	-	-	-	-	-	-
1906	T. H. Dudley	G. D. Snyder	W. A. Armstrong;	Abe S. Reel	Alf Morris	H. L. Coffman	J. Euclid Miles	Roscoe H. Dow

=== Board of trustees (1886–1906) ===
The residents of the town of Santa Monica voted to incorporate November 30, 1886, and chose a board of five trustees.

Year	Trustees				
1903	J. C. Steele	T. H. Dudley	A. F. Johnston	H. X. Goetz	W. S. Vawter
1902	J. C. Steele	T. H. Dudley	C. H. Sammis	J. C. Morgan	W. S. Vawter
1900	Robert F. Jones	T. H. Dudley	C. H. Sammis	J. C. Morgan	N. R. Folsom
1898	Robert F. Jones	N. A. Roth	J. J. Carrillo	Moses Hostetter	R. C. Gillis
1896	Robert F. Jones	N. A. Roth	J. J. Carrillo	Moses Hostetter	R. C. Gillis
1894	Robert F. Jones	N. A. Roth	J. J. Carrillo	T. A. Lewis	E. J. Vawter
1892	R. R. Harris	H. C. Beville	J. J. Carrillo	T. A. Lewis	E. J. Vawter
1890	J. L. Allen	John Steere	J. J. Carrillo	T. A. Lewis	E. J. Vawter
1888	E. C. Folsom	Thomas Rhodes	J. J. Carrillo	T. A. Lewis	W. S. Vawter
1886	E. C. Folsom	John Steere	A. E. Ladd	J. W. Scott	W. S. Vawter
