= Carlos Antonio Carrillo =

Governor of Alta California Mexico from 1837 to 1838

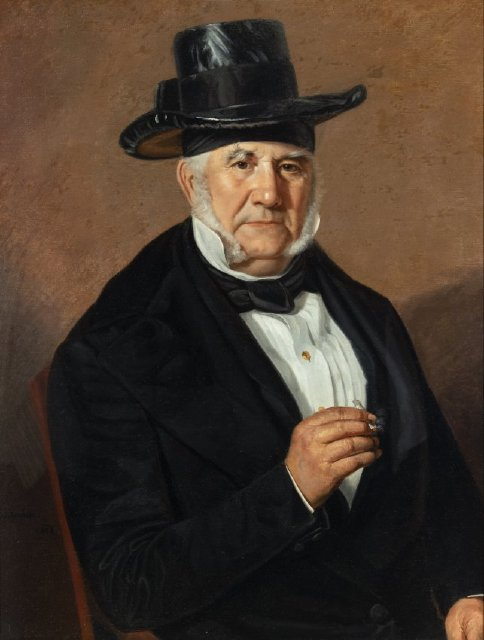
- Portrait by Leonardo Barbieri, 1852.

Nominated Governor of California
- In office 6 December 1837 – 20 May 1838
- Preceded by: Juan Bautista Alvarado
- Succeeded by: Juan Bautista Alvarado

Member of the Congress of the Union of the United Mexican States
- In office 1830–1832
- Constituency: Alta California

Personal details
- Born: 24 Dec 1783 Santa Barbara, Las Californias, New Spain
- Died: 23 February 1852 (aged 68) Santa Barbara, California, U.S.
- Spouse: Maria Josefa Raymunda Castro
- Children: Manuela, Francisca (at least)
- Parent: José Raimundo Carrillo (father)
- Relatives: actor Leo Carrillo, great grandson
- Profession: Politician, soldier

Military service
- Allegiance: Mexico

Carlos Antonio Carrillo (24 December 1783 – 23 February 1852), was a Californio politician, military officer, and ranchero. He was nominated to serve as Governor of Alta California from 1837 to 1838, in opposition to Juan Bautista Alvarado's rule. However, after failing to subdue Alvarado, Carrillo relinquished his claim to the governorship to Alvarado in 1838.

== Life ==
Carrillo was a member of the Carrillo family of California, a prominent Californio family, one of the first children born at the Presidio of Santa Barbara (established 1782). His father, José Raimundo Carrillo, was a soldier who came north with the Portolá expedition in 1769 and served at the Presidio of Santa Barbara for twelve years.

From 1797 to 1825 Carlos Antonio served in the military at Monterey and Santa Barbara. As Alta California's delegate to the Mexican Congress of the Union, Carrillo pursued Alta California judicial reform, but his ideas were rejected. In 1836, Carrillo joined the rebellious Juan Bautista Alvarado in demanding a more autonomous Alta California, but internal dissension doomed the effort. In 1837, Carlos was appointed to replace Alvarado as governor, but Alvarado was able to reclaim the Governorship a year later.

Governor Manuel Micheltorena gave a Mexican land grant of Santa Rosa Island, in the Channel Islands of California, to Carlos and his brother José Antonio Carrillo in 1843. They later gave the island to Carlos' daughters, Manuela Carrillo Jones and Francisca Carrillo Thompson.
