= José Antonio Carrillo =

Californio politician (1796–1862)

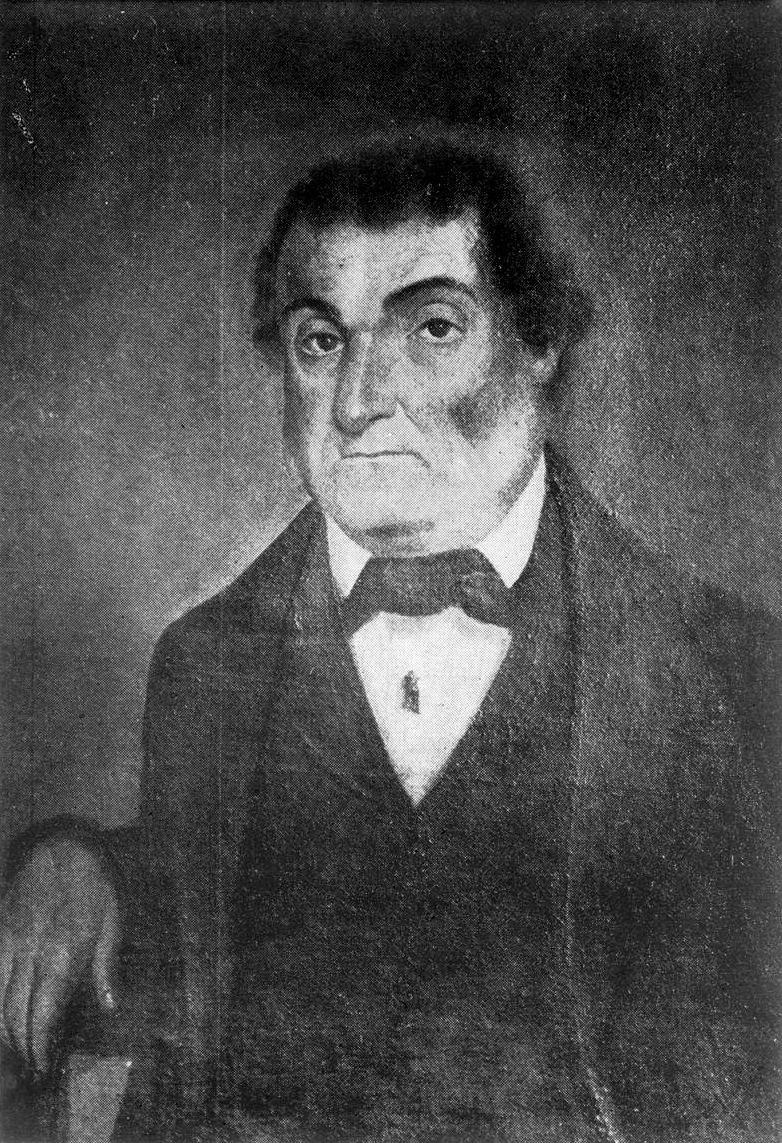

Alcalde of Los Angeles
- In office 1833–1834
- In office 1828–1829
- In office 1826–1826

Member of the Congress of the Union of the United Mexican States
- In office 1834–1835
- Constituency: Alta California

Personal details
- Born: 1796 Santa Barbara, California
- Died: 1862 (aged 65–66) Los Angeles, California
- Spouse: María Estéfana Pico
- Profession: Politician, ranchero

Captain José Antonio Ezequiel Carrillo (1796–1862) was a Californio politician, ranchero, and signer of the California Constitution in 1849. He served three terms as Alcalde of Los Angeles (mayor).

== History ==
A member of the prominent Carrillo family of California, he was the son of the Spanish José Raimundo Carrillo, and brother of Carlos Antonio Carrillo, governor of Alta California, himself serving three non-consecutive terms as alcalde (a combination mayor/judge) of Pueblo de Los Angeles between 1826 and 1834.

José Antonio Carillo married María Estéfana Pico (1806–) in 1823, and after her death, Jacinta Pico (1815–) in 1842; both women were sisters of prominent Californios Pío Pico and Andrés Pico. He built Carrillo House in Los Angeles, fronting the historic plaza, with wings extending back on Main Street.

José Antonio Carrillo was the rancho grantee of Rancho Las Posas in 1834, in present-day Ventura County, California, and the Island of Santa Rosa of the Channel Islands.

== Political activities ==
Carrillo was alcalde of Los Angeles in 1826, 1828, and 1833. In 1836, Juan Bandini, a prominent political official who supported the American cause, was back in the revolution-making business - this time in opposition to Governor Juan Bautista Alvarado. Carrillo returned from his post as a territorial congressman in Mexico with the news that his brother, Carlos, had been appointed governor of Alta California to replace Alvarado, and that the capital had been changed from Monterey to Los Angeles.

=== Californian Constitution ===
Carrillo was a delegate to the Monterey Constitutional Convention of 1849 and was one of the signers of the Californian Constitution.

== Mexican American War ==
During the Siege of Los Angeles, Carrillo, along with Captain José María Flores and Andrés Pico, formed a militia to defend Alta California during the Mexican–American War.

Carrillo distinguished himself by leading fifty Californio Lancers to victory at the Battle of Dominguez Rancho against 203 United States Marines; killing 14, and wounding several others, while not suffering a single casualty. The Americans, under the command of US Navy Captain William Mervine, were forced to retreat from what is presently Carson to San Pedro Bay. Commodore Robert F. Stockton, leader of the US Pacific Naval Fleet, was so taken aback by the strong resistance of the Californios that he immediately set sail for San Diego to regroup.

Two months later, Stockton rescued US Army General Stephen W. Kearny's surrounded forces after the Battle of San Pasqual, and with their combined, re-supplied force, they moved northward from San Diego, entering the Los Angeles area on January 8, 1847, linking up with John C. Frémont's Bear Flag battalion.

With American forces totaling 660 soldiers and marines, they fought 150 Californios, led by José María Flores, with Carrillo second in command, in the Battle of Rio San Gabriel. The American forces were victorious, and the Californios were forced to retreat. The next day, January 9, 1847, they fought the Battle of La Mesa. American counter-battery fire forced the Californios' artillery to retreat. A cavalry charge by Californios' lancers was repulsed. This caused Flores' men to desert, and the Americans were able to advance towards Los Angeles. On January 12, 1847, the last significant body of Californios surrendered to American forces. That marked the end of the war in California. On January 13, 1847, Carrillo, acting as a commissioner for Mexico, drafted in English and Spanish the Treaty of Cahuenga, and was present at the signing.

== Reputation ==
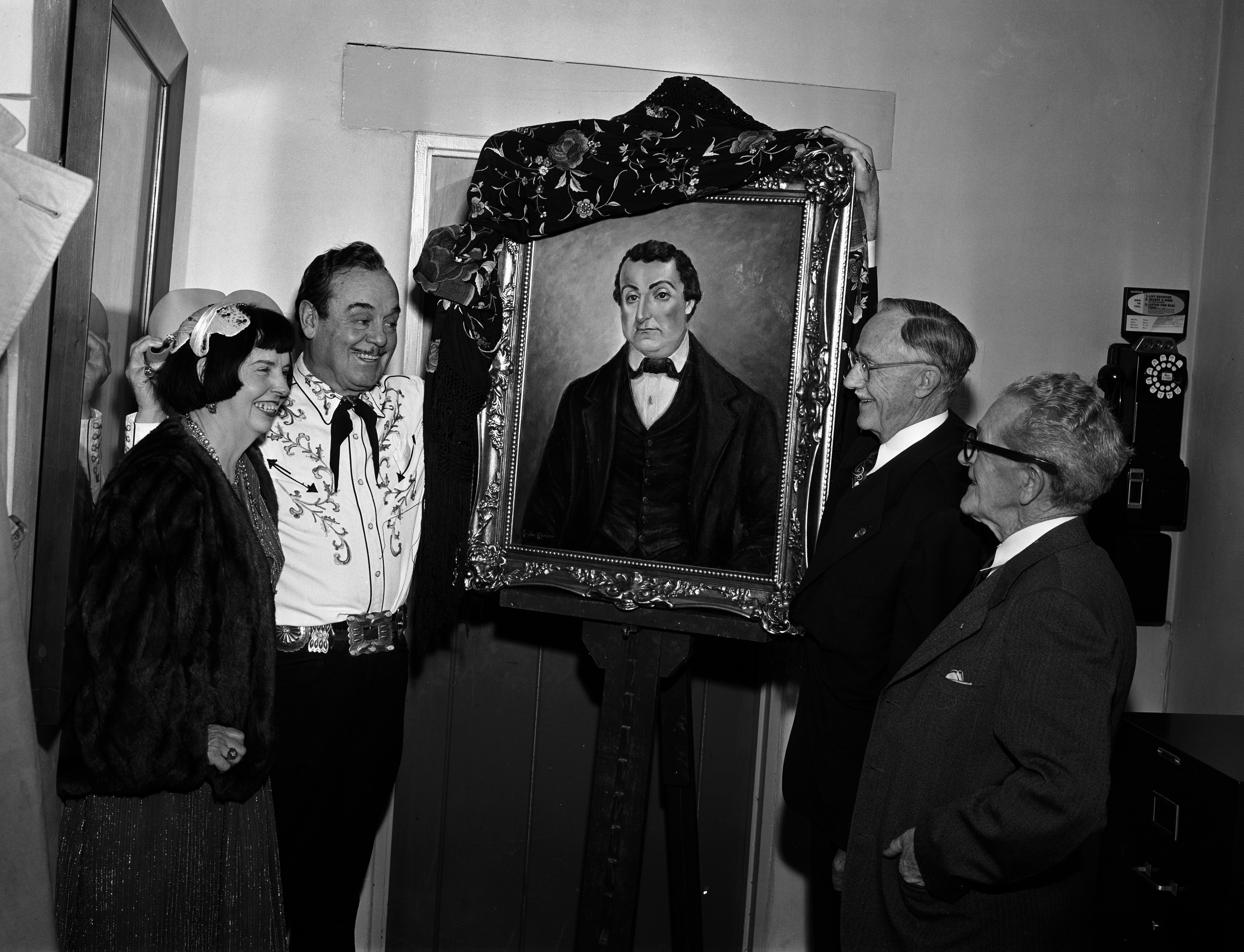
Leo Carrillo unveils portrait of his great-uncle José Antonio Carrillo, 1955

"He was a man of remarkable natural abilities for the most part unimproved and wasted. Slight modifications in the conditions and his character might have made him the foremost in Californians - either the best or the worst. None excelled him in intrigue, and he was never without a plot on hand. A gambler, of loose habits, and utterly careless in his associations, he yet never lost the privilege of associating with the best or the power of winning their friendship. There was nothing he would not do to oblige a friend or get the better of a foe; and there were few of any note who were not at one time or another both his foes and friends. No Californian could drink so much brandy as he with so little effect. A man of fine appearance and iron constitution; of generous impulses, without much principle; one of the few original and prominent characters in early California annals."

== Notable descendant ==
His grand-nephew was actor Leo Carrillo, co-star of the TV series The Cisco Kid (1950–56), as Pancho, loyal partner of Cisco.

== See also ==
- Ranchos of California
- List of Ranchos of California

Preceded by José Maria Avila	Mayor of Los Angeles; 1826	Succeeded by Claudio Lopez
Preceded by Guillermo Cota	Mayor of Los Angeles; 1828-1829	Succeeded by Guillermo Soto
Preceded by Manuel Dominguez	Mayor of Los Angeles; 1833-1834	Succeeded by José Perez
