= Olympic Theatre (Los Angeles) =

Former movie theater in Los Angeles, California, United States

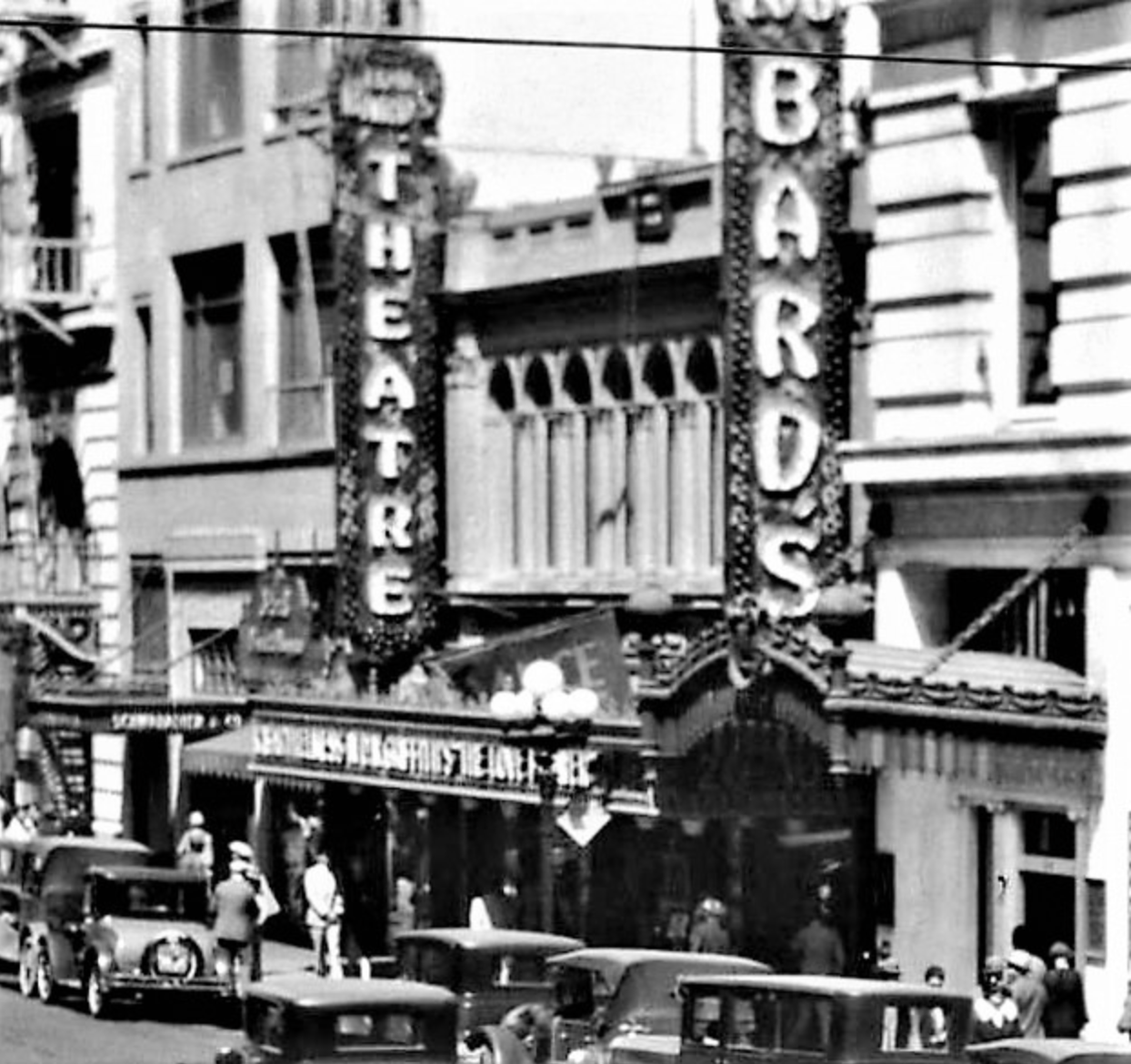
- The theater in 1927
- Interactive map of Olympic Theatre
- Former names: Bard's Eight Street Theatre
- Address: 313 West Eighth Street; Los Angeles
- Coordinates: 34.0445°N 118.2550°W
- Capacity: 600
- Type: Movie theater

Construction
- Built: 1925
- Opened: April 2, 1927
- Renovated: 1942, mid-2000s, 2017
- Closed: 1986 or 1997
- Architects: Lewis Arthur Smith (1925); Charles Matcham (1942)

Olympic Theatre, formerly Bard's Eighth Street Theatre, was a movie theater located at 313 West Eighth Street in the Jewelry District in the historic core of downtown Los Angeles. It is currently a two-story retail building.

== History ==
The building that would become Olympic Theatre originally opened as a restaurant in 1917. The building was converted to a theater by Lewis Arthur Smith, an architect known for many theaters in southern California, most notably the Vista, El Portal, Highland, Rialto, and Ventura. This theater, the last of Louis L. Bard's numerous theaters to open, was built in 1925 at a cost of $200,000 ($3.67 million in 2025). It opened as Bard's Eighth Street Theater with the premiere of Oh Baby on April 2, 1927, and had a capacity of 600 at opening.

Bard's Eight Street Theatre was renamed Olympic Theatre in 1932, a rename that corresponded to the Olympic Games being held in the city that year. A blade sign was added to the building in 1934 and the theater's exterior was remodeled, including the addition of a ticket office, in 1942. Charles Matcham led the 1942 remodel, which cost $1,500 ($29,557 in 2025).

Metropolitan Theatres, who operated Olympic Theater as a Spanish-language movie theater its later years, closed the theater in either 1986 or 1997. The building was renovated in the mid-2000s and reopened as a chandelier and French rococo furniture store in 2007.

COS moved into the building in 2017 and also restored the building's facade to its original color and look.

== Architecture and design ==
Olympic Theatre is rectangular in plan and made of concrete with stucco cladding, wood casement windows, and a tiled entryway. The building features a flat parapet, symmetric facade, and is decorated with a belt course and pilasters.

The theater interior was originally Chinese-styled, but this was later removed. Additionally, sometime between 1986 and 2004, the theater's interior was stripped to its four walls, leveled, and painted white, and the two stairways that connect the lobby and auditorium were cemented into ramps.

== In popular culture ==
Olympic Theatre was featured in the 1971 film The Omega Man.
