= Beverly Theatre (Beverly Hills, California) =

Demolished theater in Beverly Hills, CA

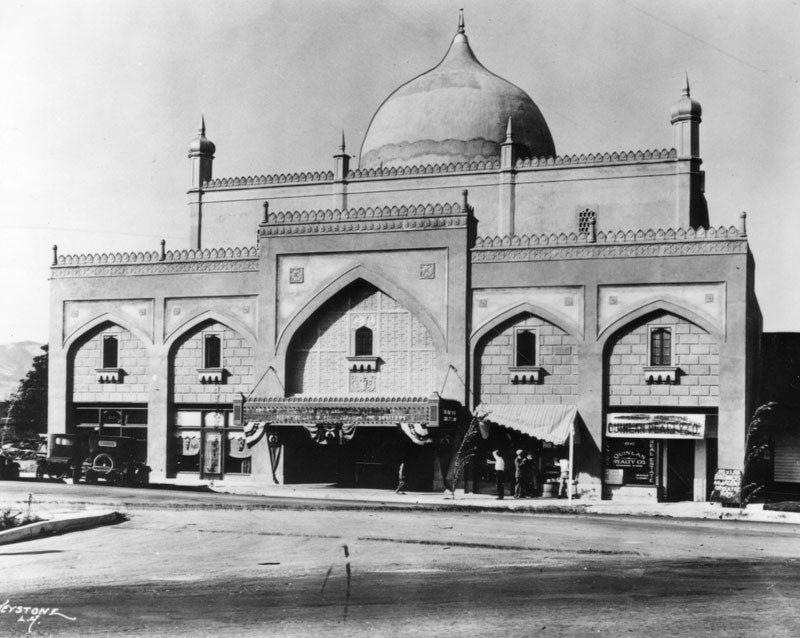
- The building in 1925
- Interactive map of Beverly Theatre
- Address: 206 North Beverly Drive; Beverly Hills, California, US
- Coordinates: 34.0675°N 118.3992°W
- Capacity: 1,270
- Type: Stage and movie theater

Construction
- Opened: May 18, 1925
- Closed: 1977
- Demolished: 2005
- Architect: Lewis Arthur Smith

Beverly Theatre, also known as Fox Beverly and Loew's Beverly, was a stage and movie theater located at 206 North Beverly Drive in Beverly Hills, California, United States. The first movie theater built in the city, it opened in 1925, closed in 1977, and the building was demolished in 2005.

== History ==
Beverly Theatre was designed for Daniel Quinlan by Lewis Arthur Smith, an architect known for many theaters in southern California, most notably the Vista, El Portal, Highland, Rialto, and Ventura. This theater, built in 1925, was Beverly Hills's first movie theater and had a capacity of 1,270.

Beverly Theatre opened on May 18, 1925 with a program that included screenings of movie stars' home tours. The theater was originally operated by West Coast Theaters, then Fox West Coast Theaters when Fox Theaters and West Coast Theaters merged in 1929. After the merger, the theater was renamed Fox Beverly.

Daniel Quinlan, who also had offices in the building, owned the theater until 1936, when he traded it for property behind the Beverly Hills Hotel. Fox West Coast Theaters continued to lease the theater until at least 1953, and Amusement Corporation of America leased the theater in the 1960s. The theater was subsequently operated by Statewide, Loew's, Mann, and finally General Cinema.

Beverly Theatre closed in 1977, after which its interior was gutted, turned into a commercial space, and occupied by Fiorucci and an Israeli bank. Preservationists attempted to preserve the building, but in 2004, the city permitted its demolition and it was demolished the following year.

Beverly Hills Gardens and Montage Hotel was built on the space in 2008.

== Architecture and design ==
Beverly Theatre was designed in a Moorish/Mughal Revival style that blended Near East and Far East motifs. The facade was inspired by Humayun's Tomb and above the facade was the building's most prominent feature: a large onion dome. The building also contained four first-floor storefronts and two second-floor studios.

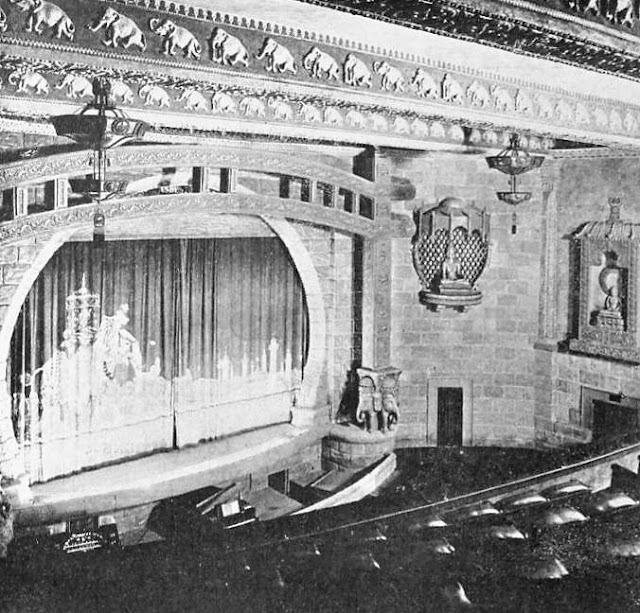
Theater interior in 1929

The theater's interior featured Arabian Nights murals, a Chinese moon gate-shaped proscenium arch, and ornamental elephants throughout. The interior also included a Wurlitzer organ and space for an eight-piece orchestra.

The theater was later remodeled in the Art Deco style, then remodeled again into a commercial space. The building's onion dome remained through each remodel.

== In popular culture ==
Beverly Theatre's interior was featured in the 1980 film Xanadu.
