= Ritz Theatre (Los Angeles, California) =

Former movie theater in Los Angeles, California, United States

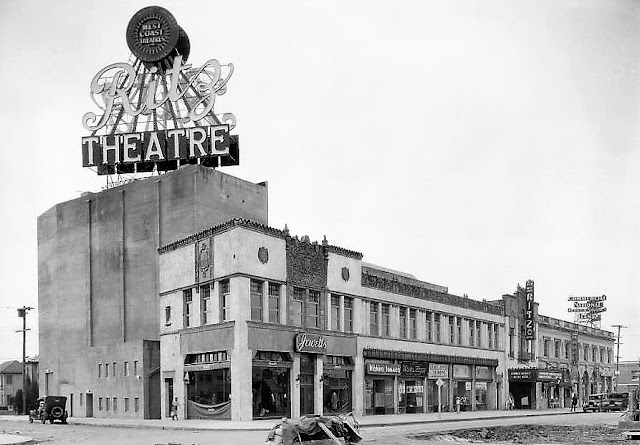
- The theater in 1926
- Interactive map of Ritz Theatre
- Address: 5214 Wilshire Boulevard; Los Angeles
- Coordinates: 34.0622°N 118.3437°W
- Capacity: 1,750 or 1,660 originally, later lowered to 1,402
- Type: Stage and movie theater

Construction
- Opened: October 15, 1926
- Renovated: late 1940s, 1963
- Demolished: 1977
- Cost: $350,000 ($6.37 million in 2025)
- Architect: Lewis Arthur Smith

Ritz Theatre, also known as Fox Ritz Theatre and Lindy Opera House, was a stage and movie theater located at 5214 Wilshire Boulevard, on the corner of Wilshire and La Brea Avenue, in Los Angeles, California.

== History ==
Ritz Theatre was designed for West Coast Theatres by Lewis Arthur Smith, an architect known for many theaters in southern California, most notably the Vista, El Portal, Highland, Rialto, and Ventura. This theater, part of a block-long commercial development that included offices, stores, and apartments, was commissioned for $350,000 ($6.37 million in 2025) in anticipation of what would become Miracle Mile, Los Angeles. Ritz Theatre, one of the first "talking" movie theaters in Los Angeles, opened with a screening of The Strong Man on October 15, 1926. Its capacity was either 1,660 or 1,750 at opening, and was later reduced to 1,402.

In 1929, West Coast Theaters merged with Fox Theaters, after which this theater was renamed Fox Ritz Theatre. In the 1950s, the theater was used for private screenings by producer Mike Todd and on January 25, 1960, Scent of Mystery and its accompanying smell-o-vision had its west coast premiere in the theater. In December 1963, Sidney Linden reopened the theater as the Lindy Opera House. The theater was later briefly converted back to a movie theater and then to a Korean church.

Ritz Theatre and the building it was part of was razed in 1977 and replaced by a parking lot, the parking lot later replaced by another development.

== Architecture and design ==
Ritz Theatre originally featured Beaux Arts architecture with Spanish and French Baroque ornamentation in its interior. The exterior also featured an ornate rooftop electric sign and the interior a 42-by-30-foot stage for live performances.

After World War II, Ritz Theatre's exterior was sheathed in concrete, glass, and steel. The rooftop sign remained through and after the remodel.
