= Tivoli Theatre (Los Angeles) =

Former movie theater in Los Angeles, California, United States

- Interactive map of Tivoli Theatre
- Address: 4217-4219 (renumbered to 4317 in 1939) S. Central Avenue; Los Angeles
- Coordinates: 34.0077°N 118.2565°W
- Capacity: 450 (1926); 873 (1931)
- Type: Stage and movie theater

Construction
- Built: 1921
- Renovated: 1931
- Demolished: 1971
- Architect: Lewis Arthur Smith

Tivoli Theatre, also known as Bill Robinson Theatre, was a stage and movie theater located at 42nd Street and Central Avenue in Los Angeles, California.

== History ==
Tivoli Theatre was designed by Lewis Arthur Smith, an architect known for many theaters in southern California, most notably the Vista, El Portal, Highland, Rialto, and Ventura. This theater was built in 1921 at a cost of $65,000 ($1.17 million in 2025). Its original address was 4217 South Central Avenue, although the street number was changed to 4219 in 1929. The theater was listed as having a capacity of 450 in 1926.

The theater was broken into in early October 1923; a safe with $1,200 ($22,676 in 2025) was taken.

By 1931, the theater's staff was entirely African American and its patrons mostly the same. The capacity was raised to 873, with the most expensive seats for live shows going for as much as $60 ($1,416 in 2025). In 1937, the theater was renamed Bill Robinson Theatre and in 1939, the theater's street number was changed a second time, to 4317.

The building was damaged during the 1971 Sylmar Earthquake and was demolished later that year.

== Architecture and design ==
Tivoli Theatre was made of pressed brick with a cast stone facing and featured plate glass windows, reinforced concrete lintels, skylights, marble, and tile.
