= Grauman's Egyptian Theatre =

Movie theater in Los Angeles, California, United States

- Egyptian Theatre
- U.S. Historic district – Contributing property
- Los Angeles Historic-Cultural Monument
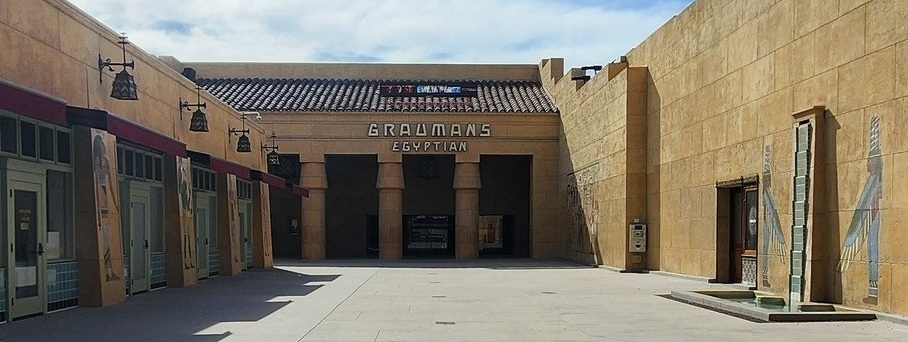
- The theater in 2024

- Location within the Los Angeles metropolitan area
- Location: 1650–1654 McCadden Pl & 6706–6712 Hollywood Blvd., Hollywood, Los Angeles, California
- Coordinates: 34°06′03″N 118°20′11″W
- Built: 1922
- Architect: Meyer & Holler
- Architectural style: Egyptian Revival, Programmatic
- Part of: Hollywood Boulevard Commercial and Entertainment District (ID85000704)
- LAHCM No.: 584

Significant dates
- Designated CP: April 4, 1985
- Designated LAHCM: September 21, 1993

Grauman's Egyptian Theatre, also known as Egyptian Hollywood and the Egyptian, is a historic movie theater located on Hollywood Boulevard in Hollywood, Los Angeles, California. Opened in 1922, it is an early example of a lavish movie palace and was the site of the world's first film premiere; however, its popularity was supplanted by Grauman's Chinese Theatre when that theatre opened five years later.

After losing popularity to the Chinese, the Egyptian became a re-run house. MGM returned it to first run programming in 1944; they, however, were forced to sell the theater in 1949, after which United Artists operated it until 1992. The American Cinematheque restored the theater in 1998 and operated it until 2020, when Netflix bought it. Following a second restoration, the theater re-opened in 2023, with Netflix in charge of programming Monday through Thursday while the Cinematheque programs Friday through Sunday.

== History ==
=== Origins ===
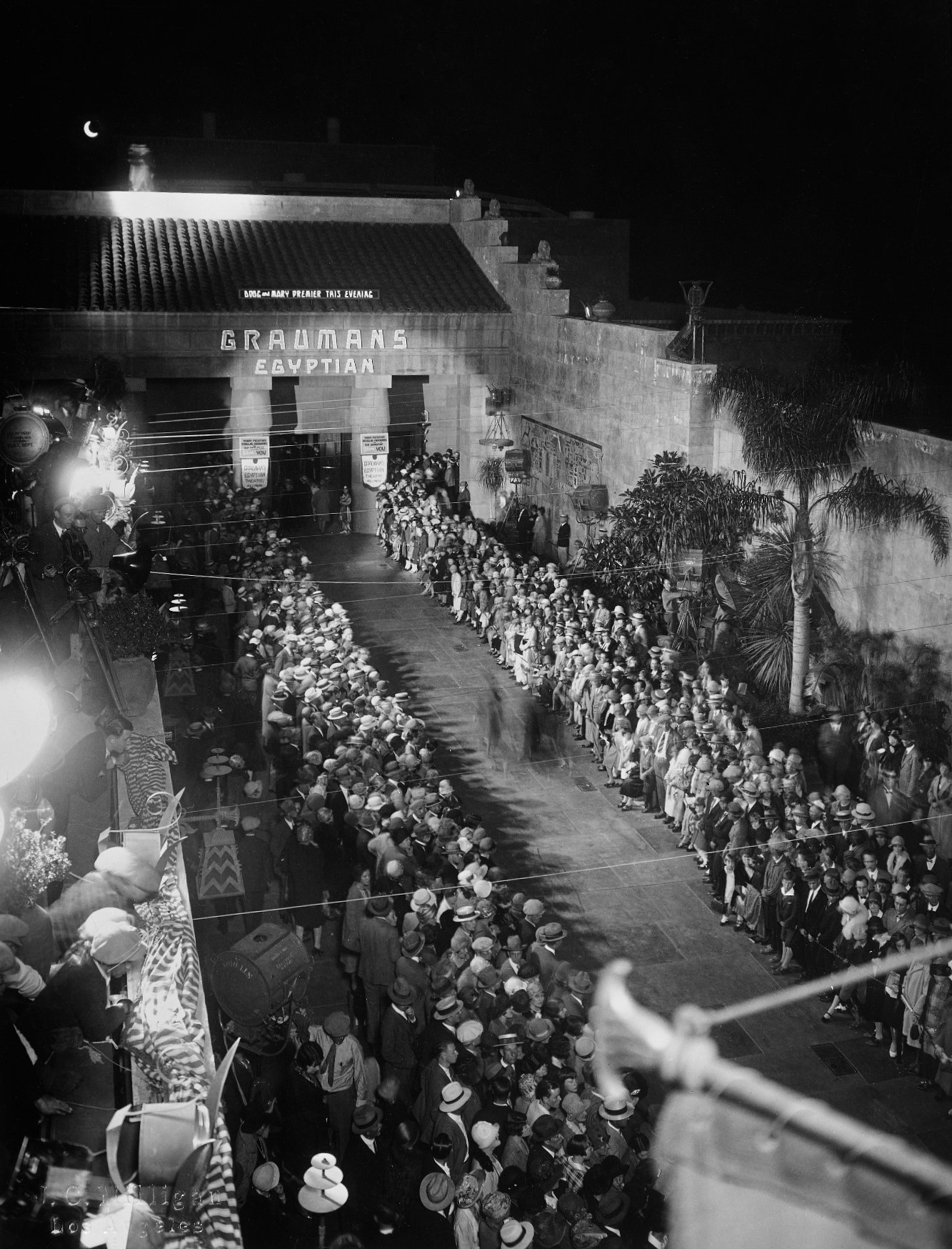
West coast premiere of The Black Pirate, 1926

The Egyptian was built by showman Sid Grauman, who previously opened the Million Dollar Theater and later designed Grauman's Chinese, and Charles E. Toberman, who later built the El Capitan and Chinese. This theater, designed with an Egyptian theme to capitalize on the Egyptomania that was occurring at the time, took 18 months to construct at a cost of $800,000 ($15.4 million in 2025). Architects Meyer & Holler designed the building and it was constructed by the Milwaukee Building Company, a Meyer & Holler affiliate.

The Egyptian was the site of the world's first film premiere, Douglas Fairbanks in Robin Hood, in 1922. Additional premieres that took place in this theater in the 1920s include The Ten Commandments, The Thief of Bagdad, The Gold Rush, Don Juan, the west coast premiere of The Black Pirate, and many more. The theater sat 1,771.

=== Decline ===
In 1927, Grauman opened Grauman's Chinese, also on Hollywood Boulevard. This theater's popularity surpassed the Egyptian, most likely due to the Chinese's celebrity handprints, footprints, and signatures in the concrete of its forecourt, and following its opening, Fox West Coast Theaters operated the Egyptian as a re-run house.

The Egyptian returned to first-run premieres in 1944, when it became the exclusive Hollywood showcase for MGM. However, MGM was forced to relinquish this theater in 1949, when the Paramount Decree barred major studios from operating movie theaters. United Artists operated this theater from 1949 to 1992, with the theater showcasing 20th Century Fox films from the 1970s onwards. Additionally, a large curved Todd-AO screen was added to the theater in 1955; much of the original proscenium arch demolished to make room for the screen.

In 1985, the Hollywood Boulevard Commercial and Entertainment District was added to the National Register of Historic Places, with the Egyptian Theatre listed as a contributing property in the district. The theater fell into disrepair and closed in 1992. The Los Angeles Community Redevelopment Agency bought the theater for $1.7 million ($3.79 million in 2025) the following year, the same year the theater was designated a Los Angeles Historic-Cultural Monument.

=== Revitalization ===
The Egyptian underwent two large restoration efforts, the first by the American Cinematheque in the late 1990s and the second by Netflix in the early 2020s. The entire process is considered a "case study in reversibility" by Los Angeles City staff.

==== American Cinematheque ====
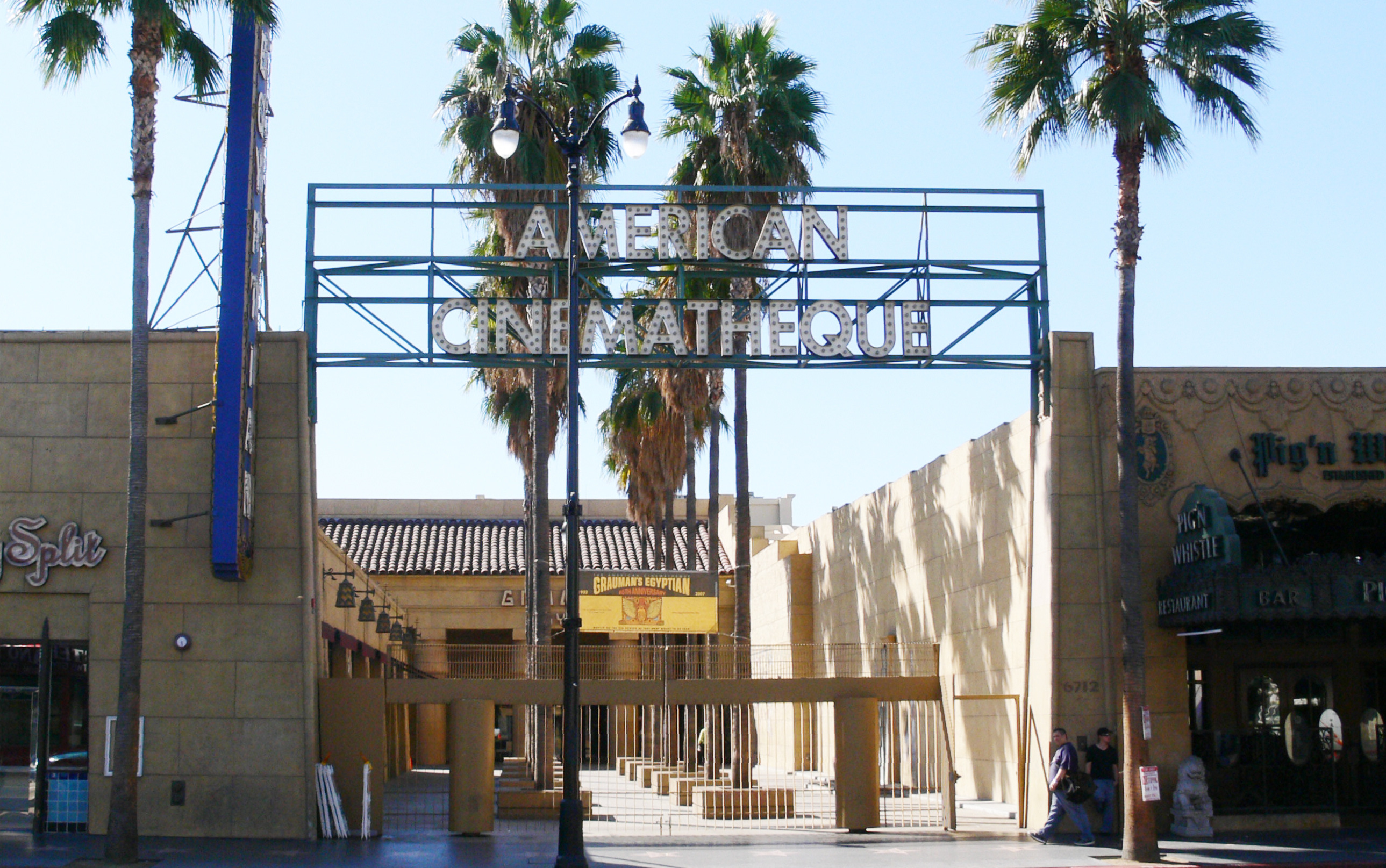
The theater in 2008, post-Cinematheque renovation

In 1996, the Los Angeles Community Redevelopment Agency sold the Egyptian to the American Cinematheque for a nominal $1, with the provision that the building be restored to its original grandeur and reopened as a movie theater. The Cinematheque raised $12.8 million ($29.4 million in 2025) to pay for the restoration, which was done by architecture and design studio Hodgetts + Fung.

The Egyptian theater reopened on December 4, 1998. The restored theater, named after Lloyd Rigler, sat 616 patrons, while a new second theater named after Steven Spielberg sat 78. The forecourt was also restored, with palm trees and planters added. In 2000, the restoration project won the National Preservation Award from the National Trust for Historic Preservation.

==== Netflix ====
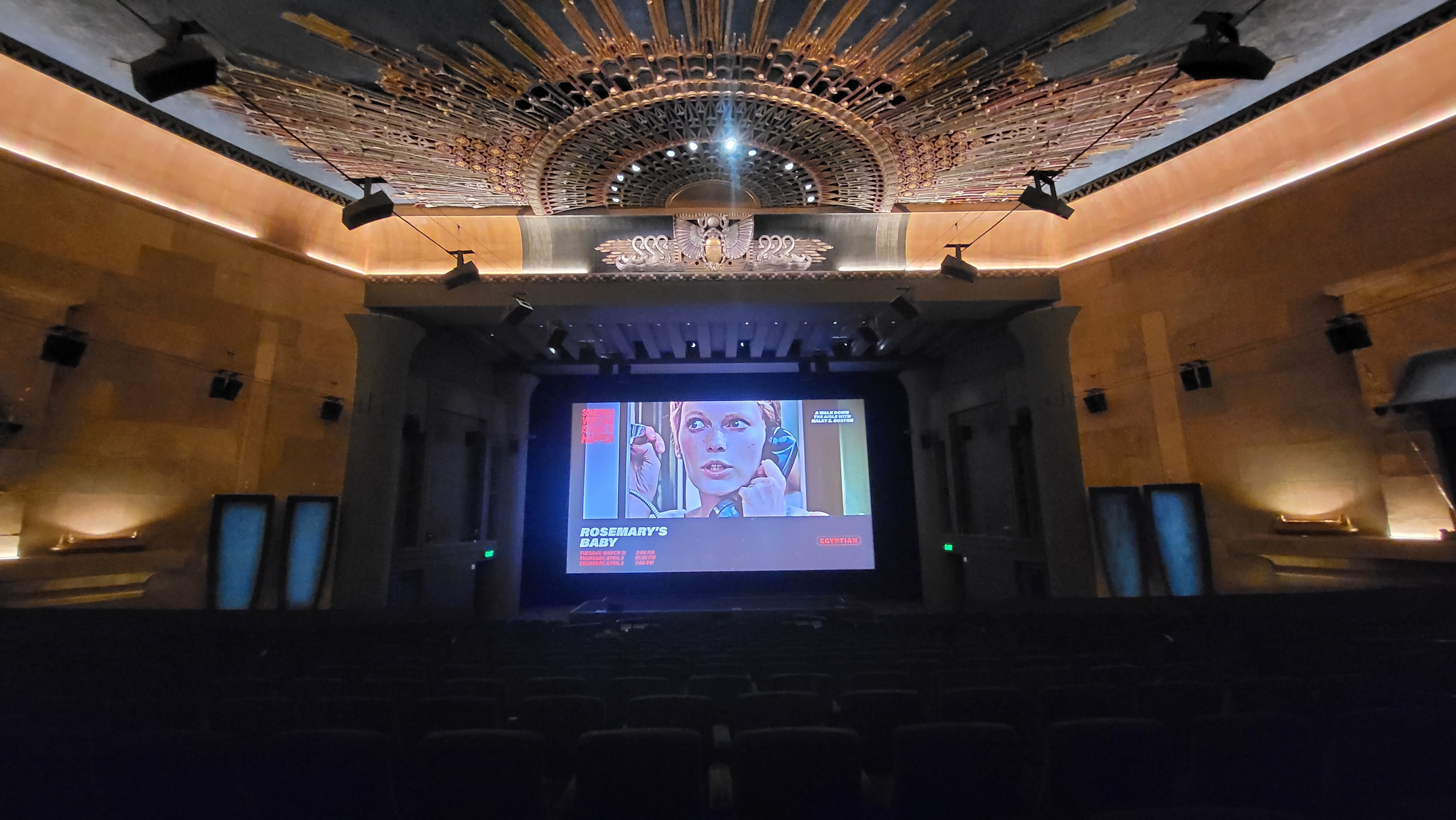
The theater in 2026, post-Netflix renovation

In 2019, Netflix announced plans to purchase the Egyptian for use as a special events venue and also to qualify its films for Oscar nominations and screen its films and television shows for Oscar and Emmy voters. Netflix also announced that the American Cinematheque would still hold events on weekends. A year later, Netflix announced that they would acquire the theater and invest in renovations. The theater's purchase price was $14.4 million ($17.9 million in 2025) and the renovations totaled more than $70 million ($87.1 million in 2025).

The Egyptian was renovated and restored from 2020 to 2023. The restoration included the removal of elements added during the 1990s restoration, such as the main theater's balcony section and acoustic panels, the entire second theater, and the palm trees and planters in the forecourt. Modern lighting and sound upgrades were also added, and the theater's capacity was reduced to 516.

Netflix reopened the theater on November 9, 2023 with a screening of The Killer followed by a Q&A session with director David Fincher. Netflix also announced the release of the documentary short Temple of Film: 100 Years of the Egyptian Theatre, which features interviews from Guillermo del Toro, Rian Johnson, Lynette Howell Taylor, Autumn Durald Arkapaw and the theater's restoration architect Peyton Hall.

== Architecture and design ==
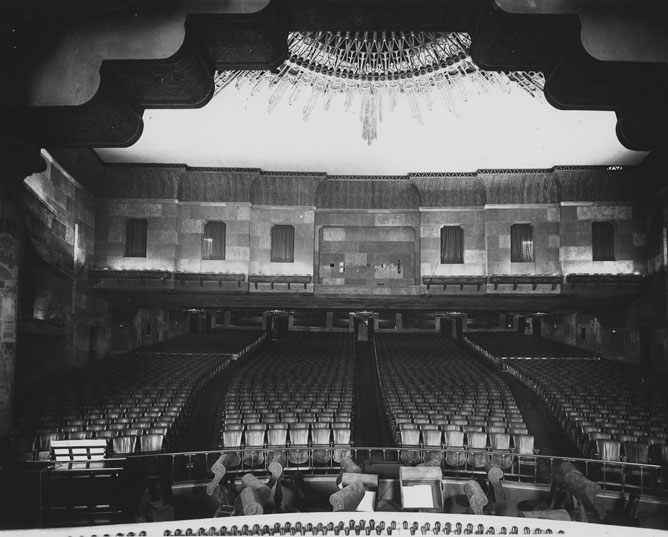
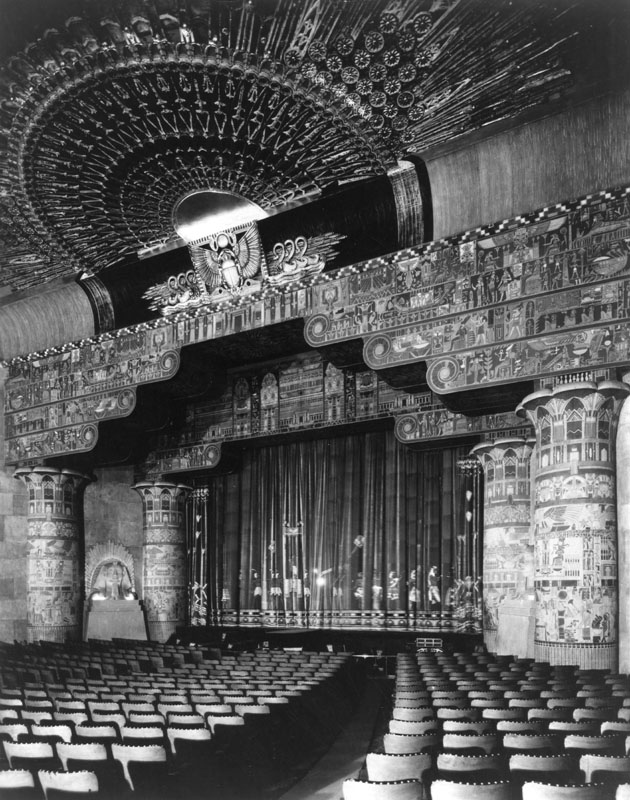
The interior in the 1920s

The Egyptian features a programmatic Egyptian Revival design; the roof panels, however, are in a Spanish style, the unconfirmed but plausible reason being that the panels had already been bought and delivered when the theater's style was changed from Spanish to Egyptian.

The building's exterior walls contain Egyptian-style paintings and hieroglyphs. The front courtyard, 45 ft × 150 ft (14 m × 46 m) in size, was designed to host red-carpet ceremonies and capitalize on Southern California's sunny weather. Storefronts along the east side of the courtyard had an "Oriental motif" and sold imports, while the Pig 'n Whistle was located west and included a side entrance direct from the restaurant to the courtyard. Originally, the courtyard served as the theater's entrance hall, as the front doors formerly opened directly into the auditorium. The four columns that mark the theater's main entrance are 4 1/2 feet (1.4 m) wide and rise 20 feet (6 m).

Inside, the theater originally contained Sphinx sculptures, singer's boxes, an orchestra pit, and a proscenium arch that featured a winged scarab surmounted by a medallion and snakes at its center. The theater's centerpiece, however, was its massive stylized sunburst device on the ceiling, which doubled as an organ grille. Several of these features, including the sculptures and orchestra pit, were removed when the theater transitioned to sound, and much of the proscenium arch was demolished to make room for an enlarged screen when the theater upgraded to Todd-AO.

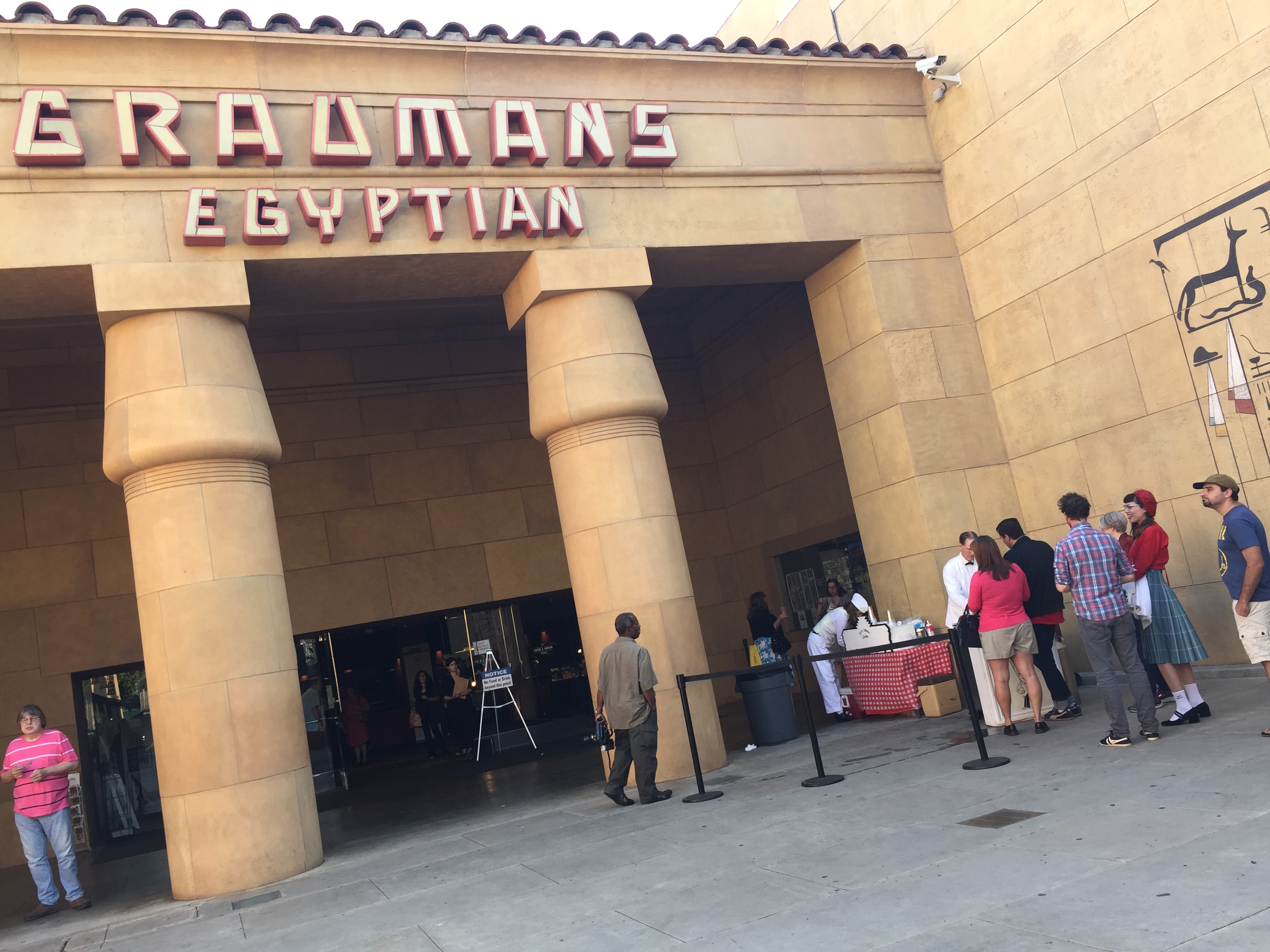
Theater entrance

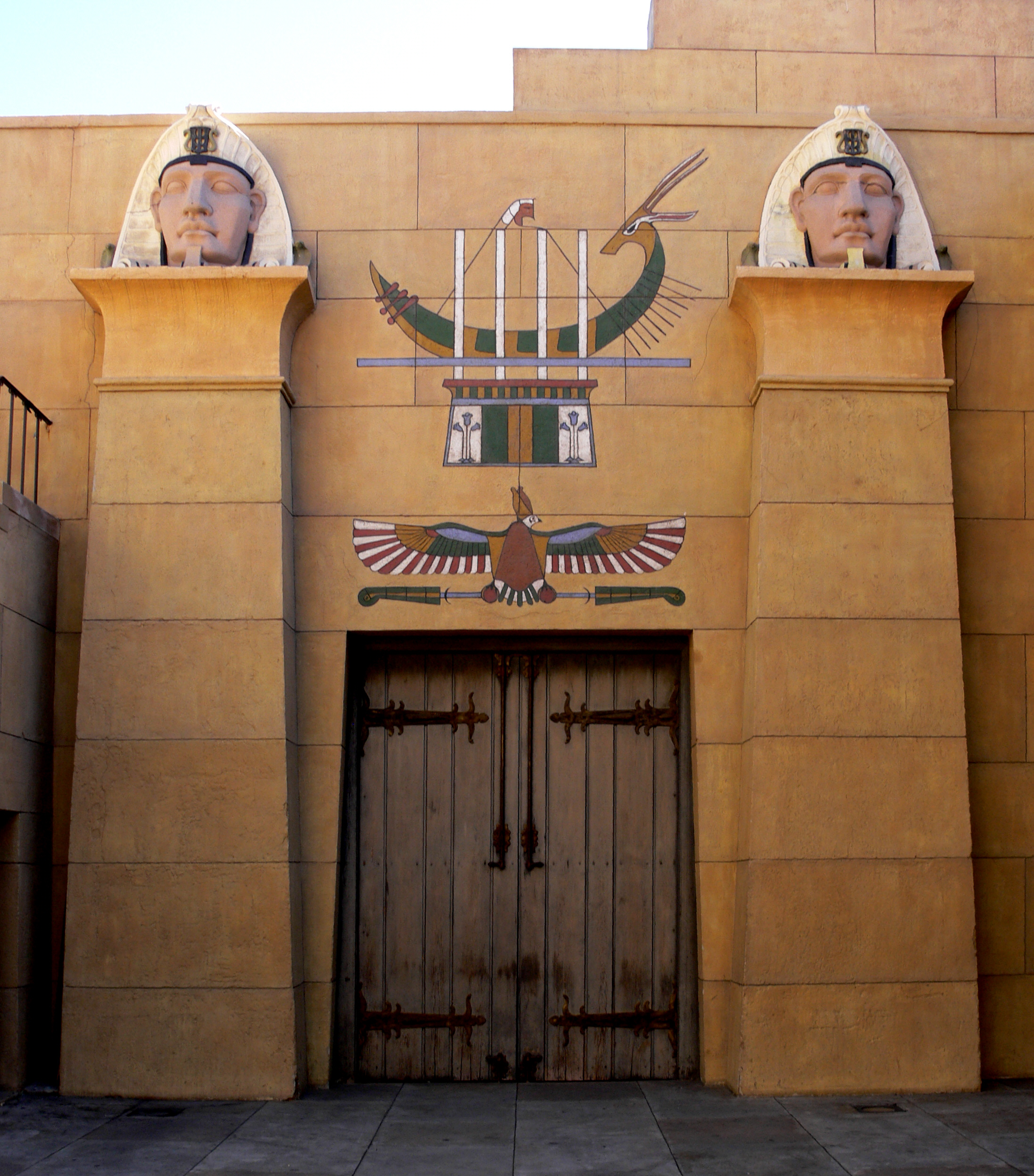
Exterior doorway

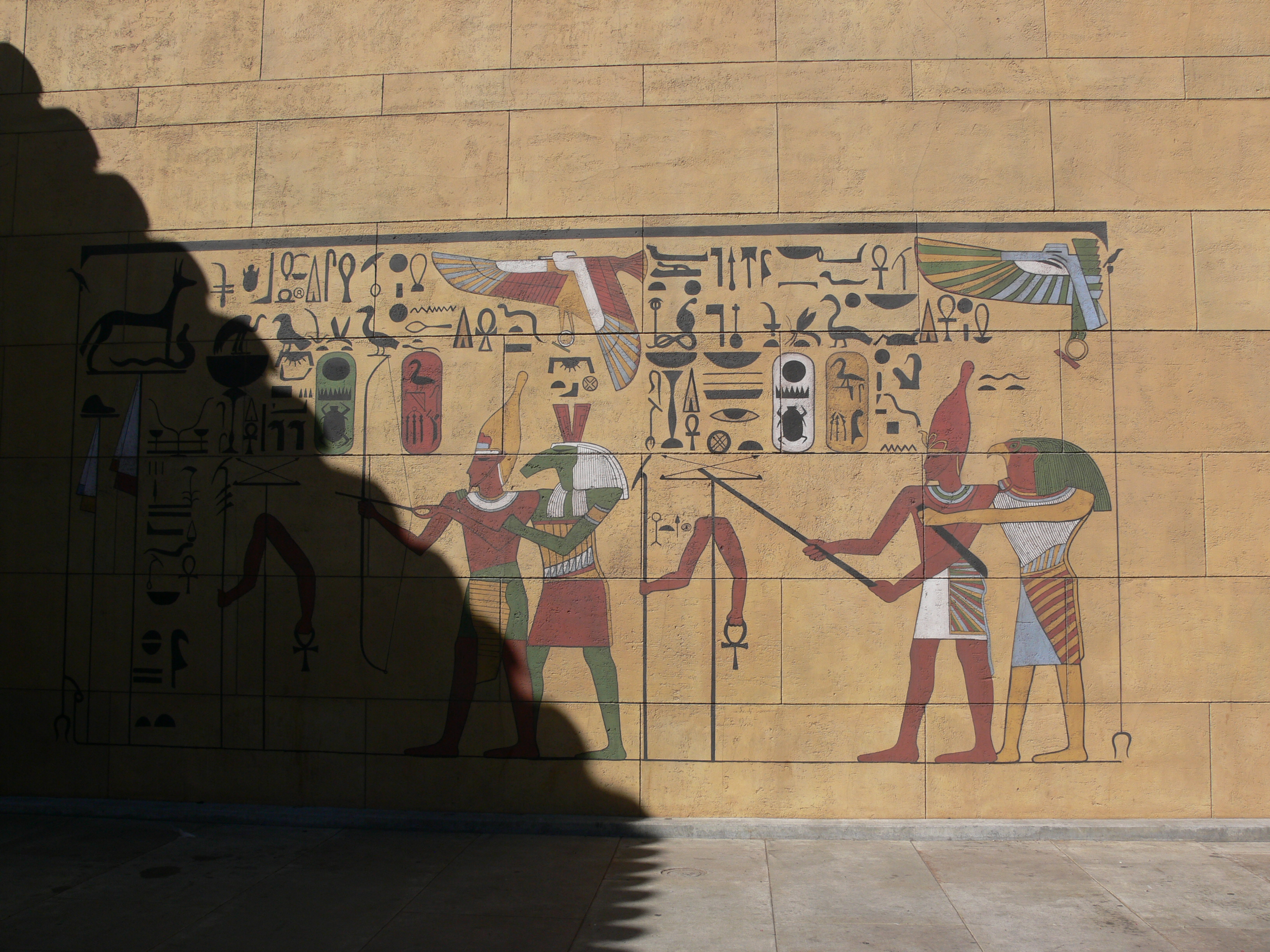
Exterior wall designs

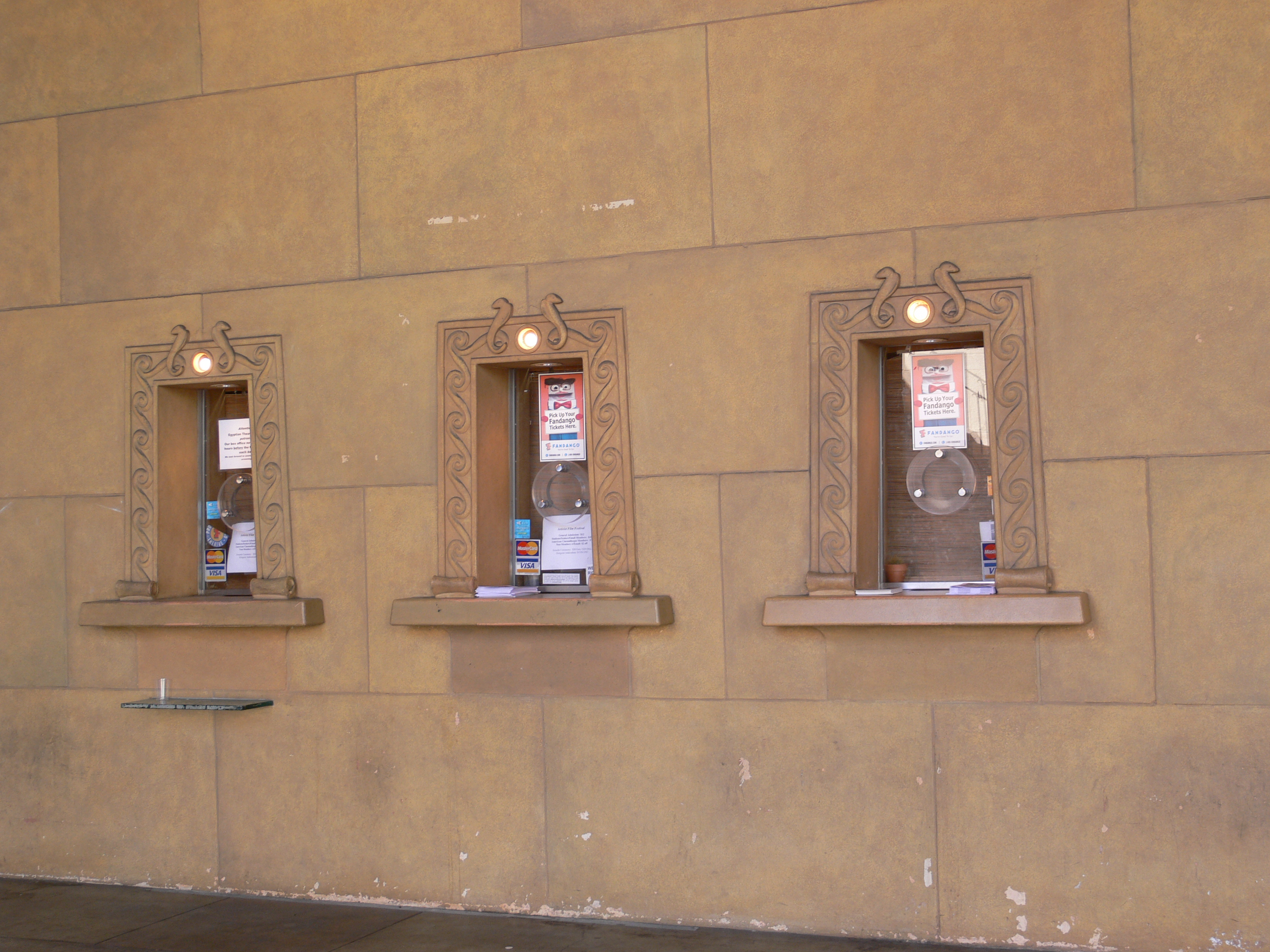
Box office

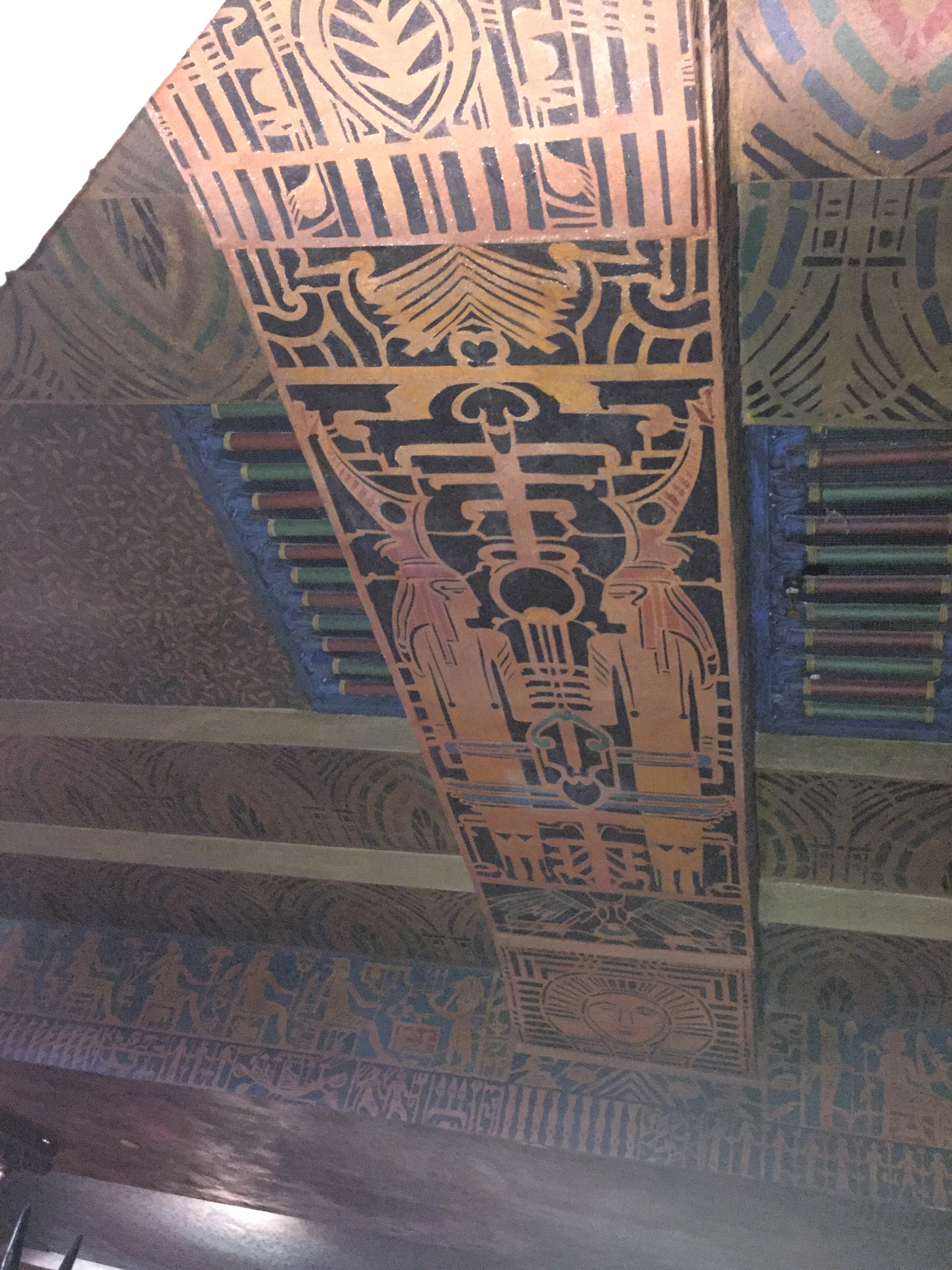
Lobby ceiling

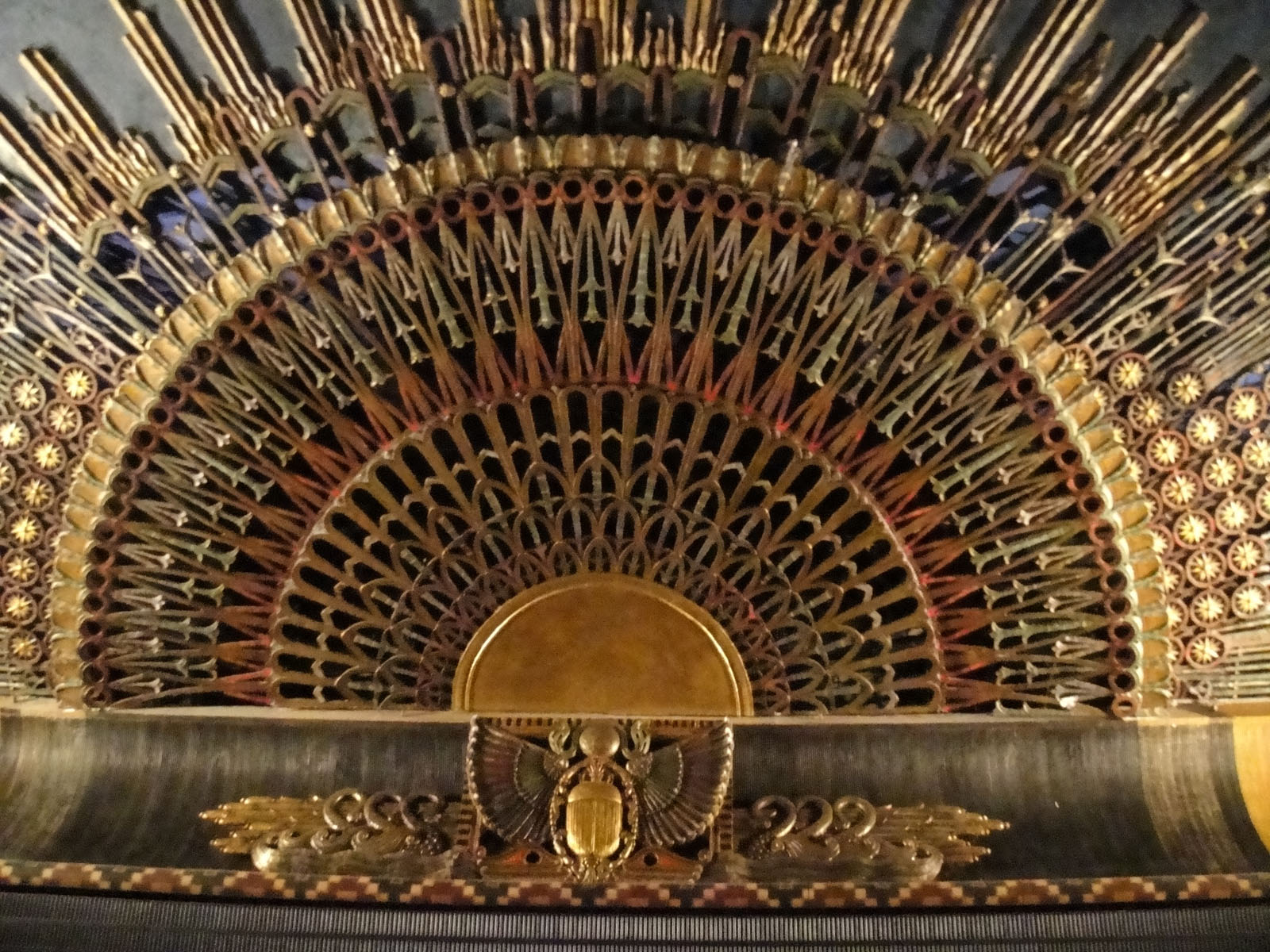
Theater ceiling

== Influence ==
Grauman's Egyptian's design was emulated by more than 40 movie theaters across North America. In California alone, the design was emulated in theaters in San Francisco, San Diego, Sacramento, Pasadena, Oakland, Bakersfield, and Glendale. Elsewhere in the United States, the design was emulated in theaters in Boise, Brooklyn, Denver, Seattle, Indianapolis, Houston, Milwaukee, and Ogden.

=== In media ===
The Egyptian was featured in episode 712 of Visiting... with Huell Howser. It also appears in Jonathan Franzen's 2021 novel Crossroads and is a location in the 2011 video game L.A. Noire.

== See also ==
- List of Los Angeles Historic-Cultural Monuments in Hollywood
- List of contributing properties in the Hollywood Boulevard Commercial and Entertainment District
