= Shipwrecked (1926 film) =

1926 silent film by Joseph Henabery

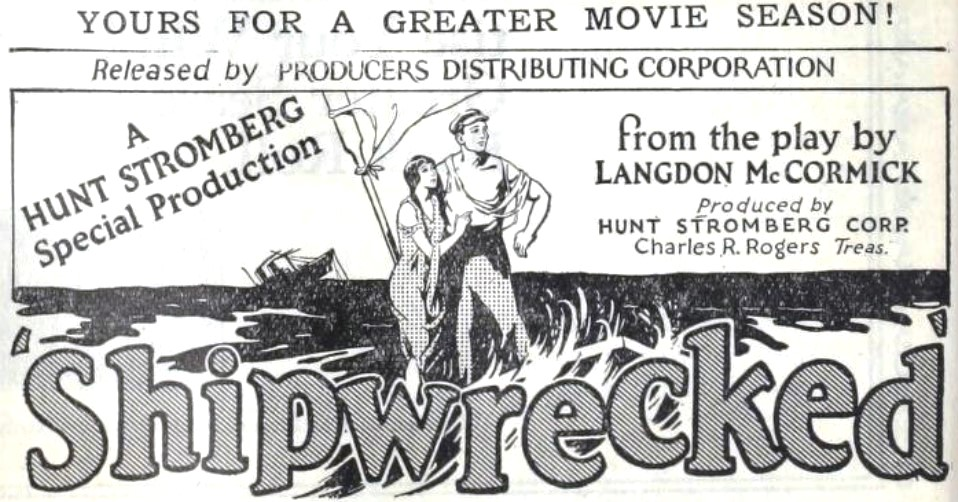
- Advertisement
- Directed by: Joseph Henabery; Douglas Dawson (ass't director)
- Written by: Finis Fox (adaptation); Harold Shumate (scenario)
- Based on: Shipwrecked by Langdon McCormick
- Produced by: John C. Flinn
- Starring: Seena Owen; Joseph Schildkraut
- Cinematography: David Kesson; Dewey Wrigley
- Production company: Metropolitan Pictures Corporation of California
- Distributed by: Producers Distributing Corporation (PDC)
- Release date: August 4, 1926
- Running time: 74 minutes
- Country: United States
- Language: Silent (English intertitles)

Shipwrecked is a 1926 American silent romantic adventure film. It was directed by Joseph Henabery, starring Seena Owen and Joseph Schildkraut. It is based on the play Shipwrecked by Langdon McCormick and was released through Producers Distributing Corporation.

== Cast ==
- Seena Owen as Lois Austin
- Joseph Schildkraut as Larry O'Neil
- Matthew Betz as Captain Klodel
- Clarence Burton as Red Gowland
- Laska Winter as Zanda
- Lionel Belmore as John Beacon
- Erwin Connelly as Chumbley
- Alice Howell as the cook

== Release ==
Shipwrecked premiered at Bard's West Adams on the theater's opening night: August 4, 1926. The cast was in attendance, as was Ben Hur screenwriter Carey Wilson who introduced the film.

Edward Lorusso produced Shipwrecked for Blu-ray release in late 2025, sourced from a 16mm print held by the Library of Congress.

== Preservation ==
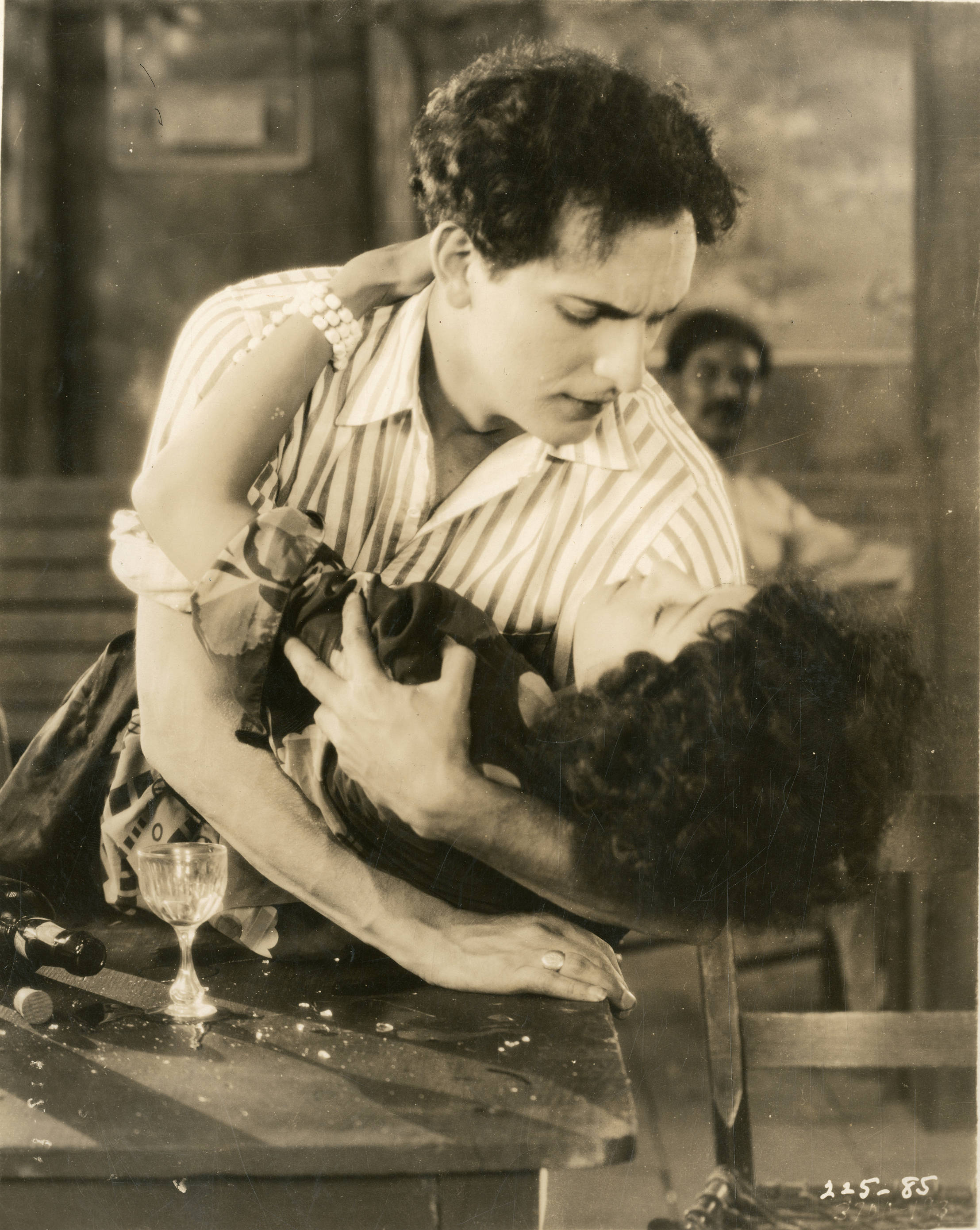
Still with Schildkraut and Owen

A print of Shipwrecked is preserved at the Library of Congress at its Packard Campus.
