= Tivoli Theatre =

Tivoli Theatre may refer to:

== Australia ==
- Tivoli Theatre, now Her Majesty's Theatre, Adelaide
- The Tivoli, Brisbane (formerly Tivoli Theatre)
- Tivoli Theatre, Melbourne (closed 1966)
- Tivoli Theatre, Sydney (demolished 1929) originally the Garrick Theatre, Sydney
- New Tivoli Theatre, Sydney (demolished 1969)

== Canada ==
- Tivoli Theatre, in Walkerville, Ontario (renovated as the Old Walkerville Theatre)
- Tivoli Theatre, Saskatoon, later the Odeon Events Centre

== Ireland ==
- Tivoli Variety Theatre, Dublin (historic)
- Tivoli Theatre (Dublin)

== Portugal ==
- Teatro Tivoli, Lisbon

== United Kingdom ==
- Tivoli Theatre of Varieties, London
- Tivoli Theatre, Aberdeen, Scotland
- Tivoli Theatre (Wimborne Minster), Dorset

== United States ==
- Tivoli Theatre (Los Angeles), California
- Tivoli Theatre (Chicago), Illinois
- Tivoli Theatre (Downers Grove, Illinois)
- Tivoli Theatre (University City, Missouri)
- Tivoli Theatre (Chattanooga, Tennessee)
- Tivoli Theatre (Washington, D.C.)

== See also ==
- Tivoli circuit, a former group of Tivoli Theatres in several cities in Australia
- Tivoli (disambiguation)
