= Tivoli =

Tivoli may refer to:

- Tivoli, Lazio, a town in Lazio, Italy, known for historic sites; the inspiration for other places named Tivoli

== Buildings ==
- Tivoli (Baltimore, Maryland), a mansion built about 1855
- Tivoli Building (Cheyenne, Wyoming), a historic downtown building
- Tivoli Hotel in Pirie Street, Adelaide, South Australia
- Villa d'Este, a 16th-century villa in Tivoli, near Rome, famous for gardens and fountains

== Entertainment venues ==
For all venues with Theatre in the name, see Tivoli Theatre (disambiguation)

=== Music ===
- Tivoli (Utrecht), music venue in Utrecht, the Netherlands

=== Sports ===
- Hala Tivoli hall, a sporting hall in Ljubljana, Slovenia
- New Tivoli, the stadium of Aachen's best-known football team, Alemannia Aachen, Germany
- Old Tivoli, the former stadium of Aachen's best-known football team, Alemannia Aachen, Germany
- Tivoli-Neu in Innsbruck, Austria
- Tivoli (Innsbruck) in Innsbruck, Austria
- Tivoli End, A stand at the Millmoor stadium in Rotherham, England

=== Other ===
- The Tivoli circuit, vaudeville venues in Australia (historic)
- Tivoli Club, 19th century Denver, Colorado gambling saloon owned by infamous badman Soapy Smith
- The Tivoli Bowl, Downers Grove, Illinois, bowling alley and bar

== Gardens, parks, and preserves ==
- Gardens of the Villa d'Este, a 16th-century villa in Tivoli, near Rome
- Jardin de Tivoli, Paris, a garden and park open between 1766 and 1842, built to resemble the gardens of the Villa d'Este in Tivoli, Italy
- Tivoli City Park, a garden and a park in Ljubljana, Slovenia
- Tivoli Friheden, an amusement park in Aarhus, Denmark
- Tivoli Gardens, an amusement park in Copenhagen
- Tivoli Japan, a Japanese version of the Copenhagen park, in Kurashiki, Okayama (closed 2008)
- Tivoli World, amusement park in Costa del Sol, Spain
- Tivoli Nature Preserve, a municipal nature preserve in Albany, New York

== Places ==
=== Towns ===
- Tivoli, Lazio, a town and commune in central Italy
- Tivoli, New York, a village in Dutchess County, New York State, United States
- Tivoli, Texas, a small town in the United States
- Tivoli, Grenada, a town in the north east of the island of Grenada
- Tivoli, Cork, a suburb of Cork, Ireland
- Tivoli, Queensland, a suburb of Ipswich in Queensland, Australia
- Tivoli, Karnataka, a village in India

=== Neighborhoods and housing ===
- Tivoli, a neighborhood in Innsbruck, Austria
- Tivoli, a residential area to the south of the centre of Cheltenham, England, UK
- Tivoli Garden, a public housing estate on Tsing Yi Island, Hong Kong
- Tivoli Gardens, Kingston, a community in West Kingston, Jamaica

=== Other geographical entities ===
- Tivoli River, a river in Bryan County, Georgia, United States
- Tivoli Pond, an 1880 pond in Tivoli City Park in Ljubljana, Slovenia

== People ==
- Lionel Tivoli (born 1988), French politician

== Other uses ==
- KGM Tivoli, a subcompact crossover SUV
- SSD Tivoli Calcio 1919, an Italian association football club
- Tívoli (film), a 1974 Mexican comedy-drama film
- Tivoli (musical), a 2001 Australian dance musical set in the Tivoli circuit
- Tivoli Audio, an audio equipment manufacturer and reseller
- Tivoli Brewing Company, a 20th-century Denver, Colorado, brewery located in Lower Downtown Denver
- Tivoli Gardens F.C., a Jamaican football team from Tivoli Gardens, Kingston
- Tivoli Software, a division and brand of IBM, known for infrastructure and service management controls and tools
- Tivoli, Giardino Di Scarlatti, original title of Sonate di Scarlatti, a ballet by Peter Martins
- Tivoli Hotels & Resorts, one of brands of Minor Hotels
