= Bard's West Adams Theater =

Former movie theater in Los Angeles, California

- The theater in 2026
- Interactive map of Bard's West Adams Theater
- Address: 4409 W. Adams Boulevard, Los Angeles, California
- Coordinates: 34.0326°N 118.3061°W
- Owner: Louis L. Bard
- Capacity: 1,000+
- Type: Movie theater
- Screen: 1

Construction
- Built: 1924—1925
- Architects: Gable and Wyant; Lewis Arthur Smith

Bard's West Adams Theater, also known as Bard's Adams and Bard's Adams Street Theater, and later as Fox Adams, Kabuki Theater, Apollo West, and Center City Theater, was a vaudeville and movie theater located at 4409 W. Adams Boulevard in Los Angeles, California. Upon opening it was considered "one of the finest residential theaters in the country."

== History ==
Bard's West Adams Theater was built for Louis L. Bard's Far West Theatres by Louis's brother Arthur. Construction began in 1924, with Gable and Wyant list as architects as of March 1924. However, by January 1925, Lewis Arthur Smith had taken over the project, which finished construction later that year. Construction of the building the theater was in, which also included stores and offices, was budgeted at $400,000 ($7.51 million in 2025) and financed by the American Mortgage Company. The theater sat more than 1,000 and also featured a $35,000 ($657,524 in 2025) pipe organ.

Bard's West Adams opened on August 4, 1926 with the world premiere of Shipwrecked, starring Seena Owen, Joseph Schildkraut, Matthew Betz, Laska Winter, Lionel Belmore, and Clarence Burton, all of whom were in attendance, as was Ben Hur screenwriter Carey Wilson, who introduced the film. The Mack Sennett comedy Hubby's Quiet Little Game and several vaudeville acts were also shown at the opening.

In 1926, live stage shows included the Da Silva Madcaps and a beauty contest whose winner represented Felix Chevrolet.

In 1927, after West Coast Theaters bought Far West Theatres, West Coast Theaters attempted to ignore a provision in the contract allowing Louis L. Bard to continue operating this theater. The company forcibly ousted Bard then obtained a temporary restraining order, after which Bard brought the matter to the courts, who ruled on his behalf. Bard's name was associated with the theater until at least October 1955, although it was known as Fox Adams for a time as well.

In 1934, the theater hosted a benefit for the Mount Sinai home. By 1965, the theater had been renamed Kabuki Theater and was showing Japanese cinema. The theater went by Apollo West and hosted black cabaret after that. In 1989, the theater went by Center City Theater and hosted live theater, including "Satch!", a musical based on the life of ballplayer Satchel Page.

The theater was eventually converted to a church.

== Architecture and design ==
Bard's West Adams featured an Egyptian motif and a stage that could accommodate vaudeville.
