= Fox Uptown Theatre =

Coordinates: 34.0524°N 118.3091°W

The Fox Uptown Theatre was a movie theater owned by Fox Theaters located at 1008 S. Western Avenue in Los Angeles.

== History ==
Fox Uptown Theatre was designed by Lewis Arthur Smith and opened on December 29, 1925, with a screening of Graustark starring Norma Talmadge. The theater was equipped with a Wurlitzer organ, had a large rooftop sign, was built and operated by West Coast Theatres, and had 1,715 seats.

When the theater closed on October 23, 1959, it was operated by National General Theatres. Its last screening was Vincent Price's The Tingler. It was demolished several years later. An indoor mall was then built on the site.
