= Highland Theatre =

Movie and live theater in Los Angeles, California, United States

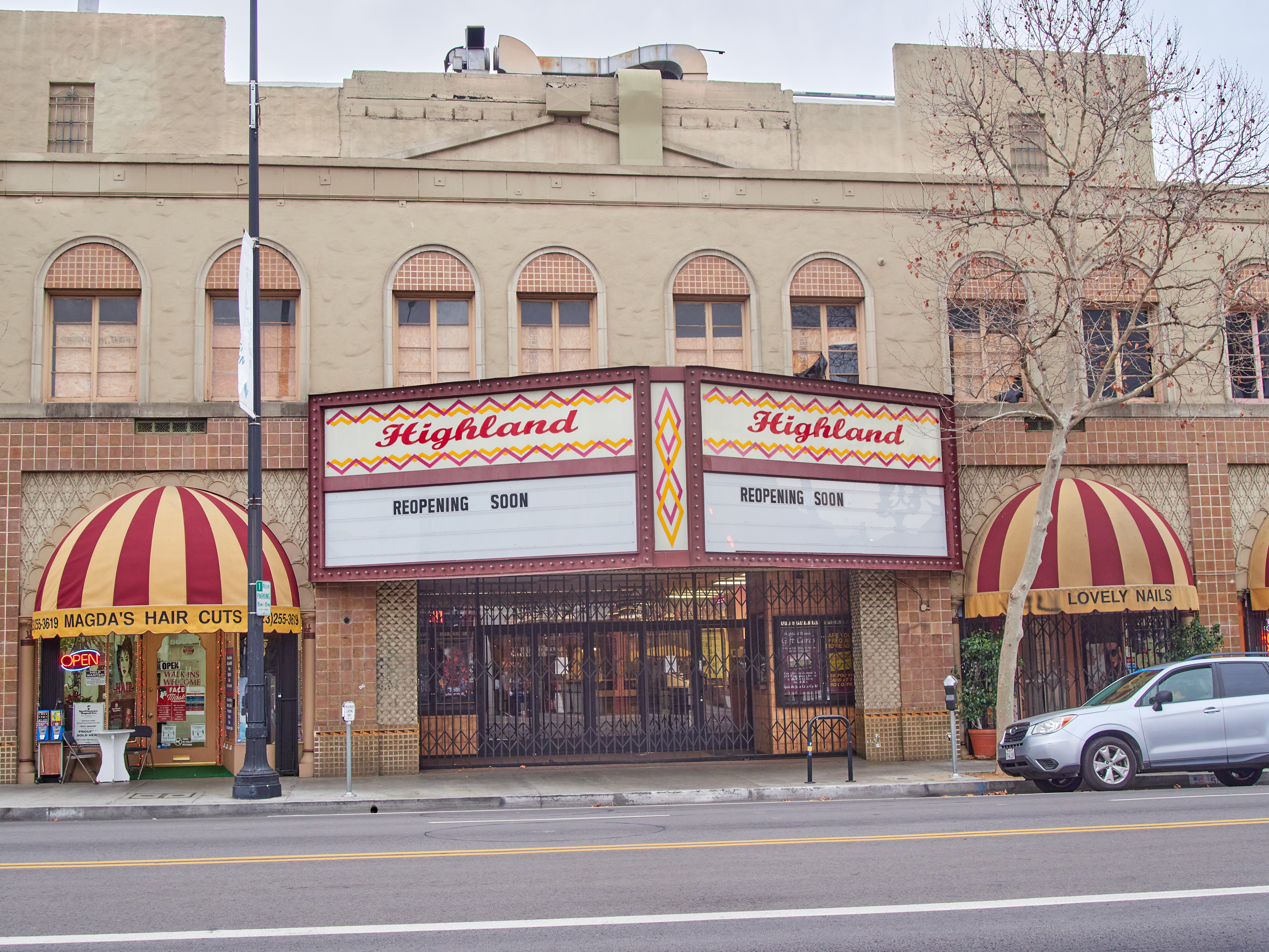
- The building in 2021
- Interactive map of Highland Theatre
- Address: 5604 N. Figueroa Street; Los Angeles
- Coordinates: 34.1091°N 118.1937°W
- Owner: Kristen Stewart
- Capacity: 1432 at opening 465 from the early 1980s on
- Type: Stage and movie theater

Construction
- Built: 1924
- Opened: March 2, 1925
- Renovated: early 1980s
- Closed: February 29, 2024
- Architect: Lewis Arthur Smith

Los Angeles Historic-Cultural Monument
- Designated: October 2, 1991
- Reference no.: 549

Highland Theatre is a three-story movie and live theater located at 5604 N. Figueroa Street in the Highland Park neighborhood of Los Angeles, California. It closed in 2024, six days short of its 100th anniversary. In February 2026, actress and director Kristen Stewart revealed she had recently purchased the theater with plans to re-open it.

== History ==
Highland Theatre was designed by Lewis Arthur Smith, an architect known for many theaters throughout southern California, most notably the Vista, El Portal, Rialto, and Ventura. Highland Theatre was built in 1924, sat 1,432, and opened on March 2, 1925 with a screening of Lady of the Night, lead actress Norma Shearer in attendance. The theater also featured vaudeville during its early years.

By June 1938, Highland Theatre was operated by Fox West Coast Theatres and in the early 1970s, a new owner used the theater to screen adult films. In 1975, the theater was bought by the Akarakian family, who brought back mainstream programming and added children's and Spanish language films as well. In the 1980s, the theater was converted from a single screen to a triplex, the new screens having a capacity of 225, 130, and 110. The building was designated Los Angeles Historic-Cultural Monument #549 on October 2, 1991.

In 2015, the theater celebrated its 90th birthday with a screening of Lady of the Night (the same film that played at the theater's 1925 opening) and a documentary about the theater's history. Both were shown during the Highland Park Independent Film Festival, which was hosted at the theater. The theater was also noted for its low ticket prices around this time; in 2016, it offered $7 ($9.39 in 2025) matinees and Tuesday and Wednesday family discounts for $5 ($6.71 in 2025) per ticket.

The theater shut down from March 2020 to May 2021 due to the COVID-19 pandemic. Cyrus Etemad, owner of the nearby Highland Park Bowl, bought the building in 2022, and the theater closed on February 29, 2024, six days short of its 100th anniversary, after failing to bounce back post pandemic. The last films to screen were Madame Web, Bob Marley: One Love, and Lisa Frankenstein.

Kristen Stewart purchased the theater in 2026 with plans to renovate it. "I didn't realize I was looking for a theater until this place came to my attention. Then it was like a gunshot went off and the race was on. I ran toward it with everything I had," she told Architectural Digest. "I'm fascinated by broken-down old theaters. I always want to see what mysteries they hold."

== Architecture and design ==
Highland Theatre was designed in the Moorish/Spanish Colonial Revival style. Its most eye-catching feature, however, is its rooftop sign, which contains 502 incandescent bulbs. The interior features murals, frescoes, metalwork, moldings, and a vintage balcony, much of which were covered when the theater was made into a triplex in the 1980s.

== In popular culture ==
Highland Theatre doubles as the New Beverly Cinema in the upcoming The Further Mis-Adventures of Cliff Booth. It was also featured in Wonder Man and numerous other films and television projects.
