= Lewis Arthur Smith =

American architect (1869–1958)

- Born: February 26, 1869; Ohio
- Died: March 13, 1958 (aged 89)
- Occupation: Architect
- Spouse: F. W. Smith
- Buildings: Vista Theatre; El Portal Theatre; Highland Theatre; Rialto Theatre; Ventura Theatre

Lewis Arthur Smith (February 26, 1869 – March 13, 1958) was an American architect best known for the many theaters he designed in the Los Angeles area, most notably the Vista, El Portal, and Highland in Los Angeles, the Rialto in South Pasadena, and the Ventura in Ventura.

== Biography ==
Lewis Arthur Smith was born in Ohio in 1869 to German parents. He had one sister three years his elder.

By 1910, Smith was living in Los Angeles. In 1914, he married F. W. Smith, however she died sometime between 1920 and 1930. Smith was living with his sister in 1930 and he died in 1958.

== Career ==
Smith's earliest know project in Los Angeles was a home for invalids, which was written about in the Los Angeles Times in 1914. Smith then continued for thirteen years as a theater and large-scale building architect, and focused exclusively on theaters from 1925 onward. Smith designed approximately forty theaters in total, many of which were for Bard's and Fox West Coast Theatres. He eventually stopped due to bankruptcy.

Smith partnered with William Pennell in 1920. He also worked for Lily-Fletcher Company that year, where he served as architect for numerous Jessie D'Arch-owned apartment buildings that would later become contributing properties in the North University Park Historic District.

=== Theaters ===
Smith's notable theaters (in Los Angeles unless otherwise noted) include:

- T and D Hippodrome, Taft (1917–1918, destroyed by fire in 1950)
- Casino (1921)
- Circle (1921)
- Tivoli (1921)
- Wilshire (1921)
- Rivoli (1921–1922)

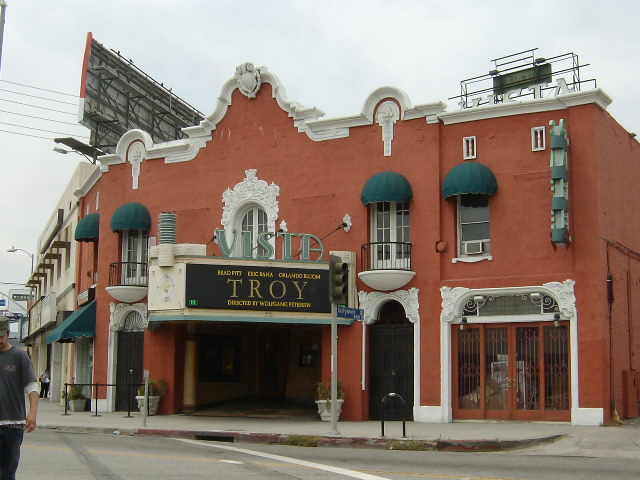
Bard's Hollywood Theatre, also known as Vista Theatre

- Bard's Hollywood (1923), now known as the Vista
- Bard's Egyptian (1923)
- Carmel (or Paris), West Hollywood (1924, demolished by fire in 1976)
- Bard's West Adams (1924–1925)
- Fox Uptown (1924–1925)
- Beverly (1924–1925, demolished 2005)
- Manchester (1924–1925)

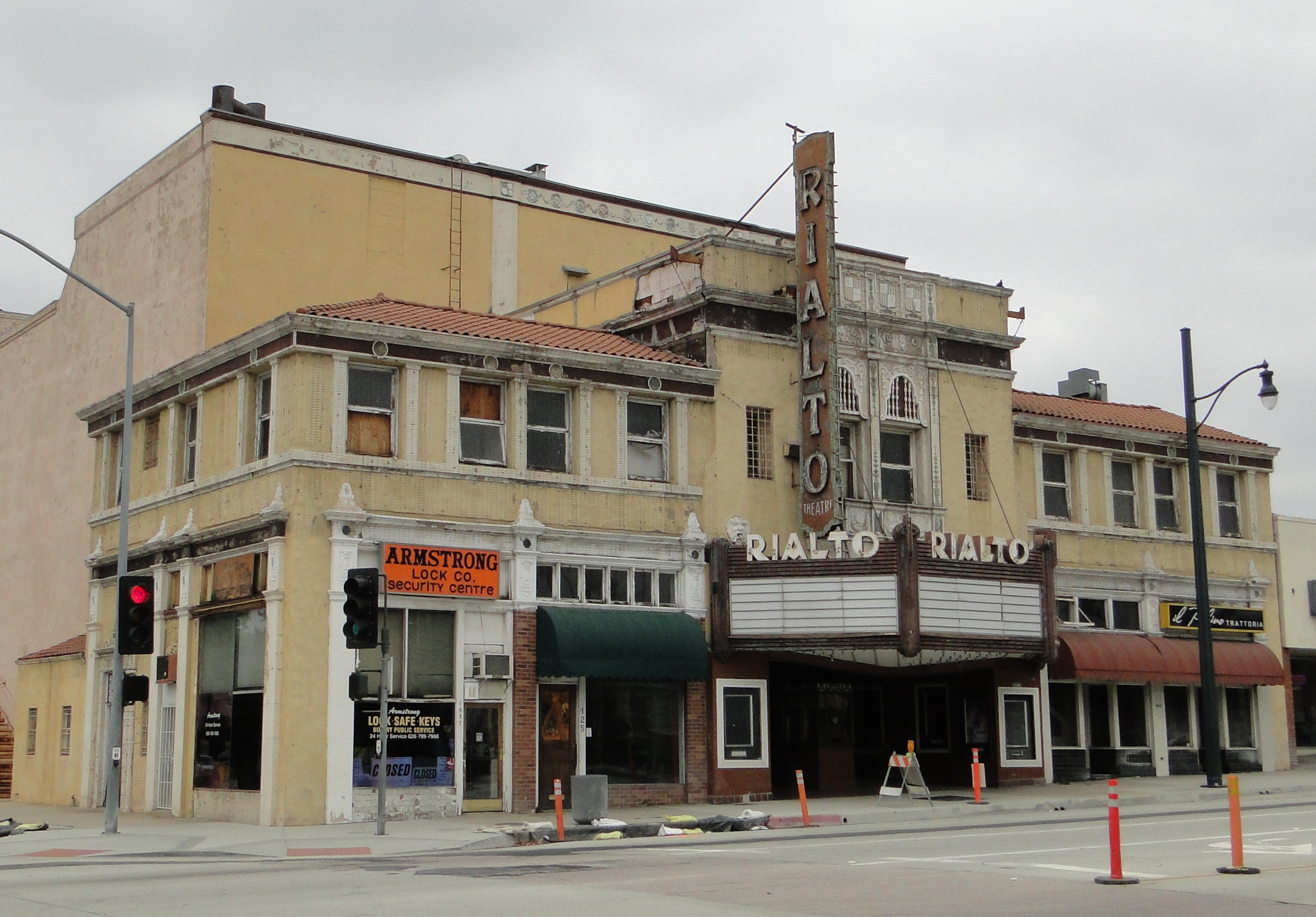
Rialto Theatre, South Pasadena

- Rialto, South Pasadena (1924–1925), NRHP No. 78000700
- West Coast, San Bernardino (1924–1925)
- Bard's Eighth Street (1925)
- Highland (1925), LAHCM No. 549

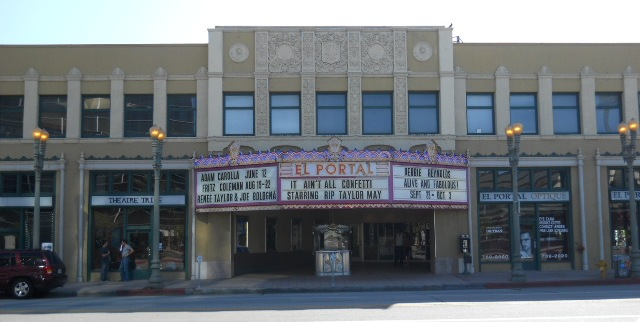
El Portal Theatre

- El Portal (1925–1926), LAHCM No. 573
- Granada, Ontario (1926)
- Ritz (1926, demolished 1977)
- West Coast Redlands, Redlands (1927–1928)
- Ventura, Ventura (1928), NRHP No. 86003523
- West Coast Riverside, Riverside (1928–1929)

=== Other buildings ===
Other buildings designed by Smith (all in Los Angeles) include:

- a home for invalids (1914)

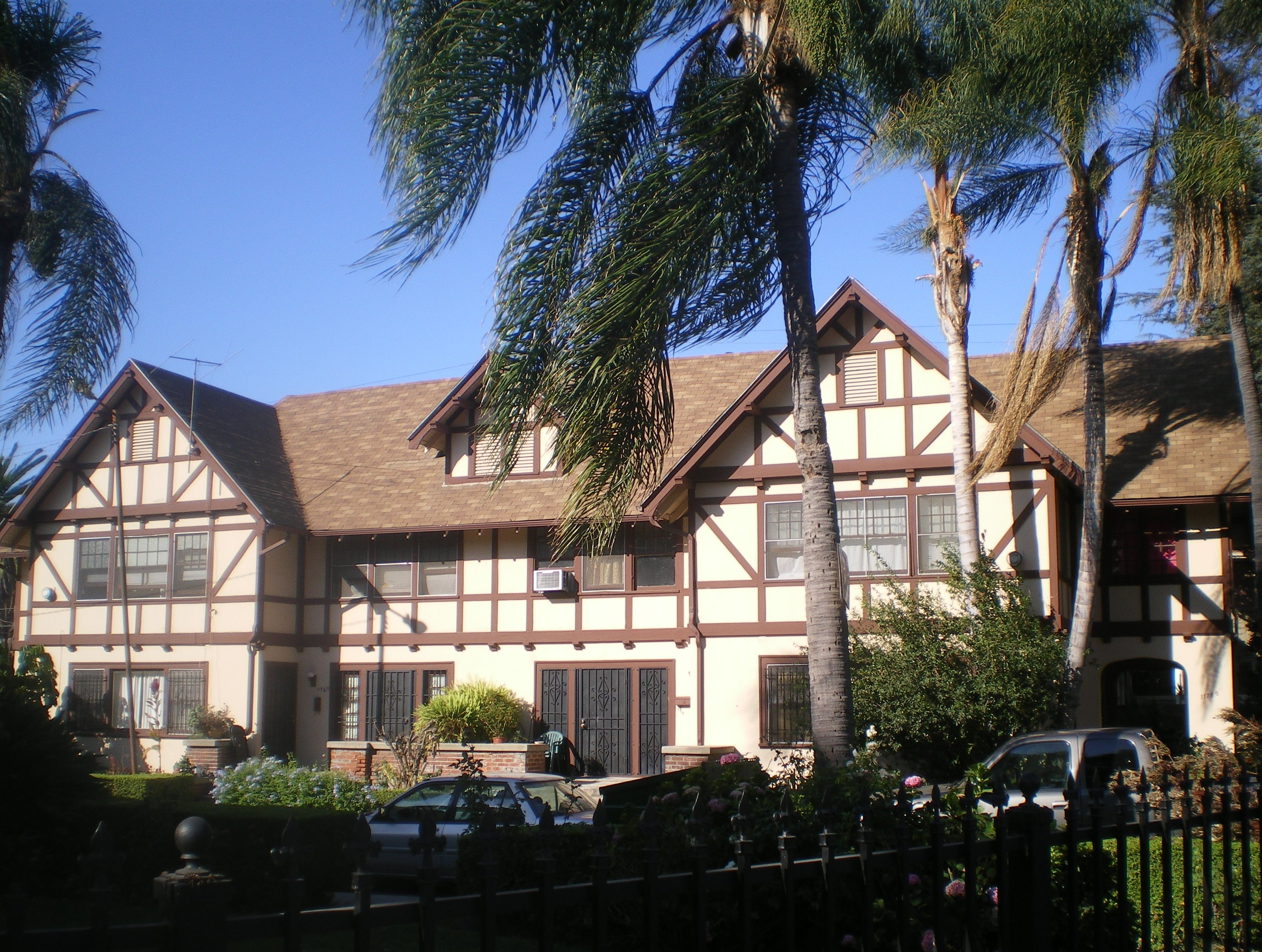
West Adams Gardens

- Jessie D'Arche Apartments (1919—1920), contributing properties in the North University Park Historic District
  - 1131 West 27th Street (1919)
  - 1155 West 27th Street (1920)
  - West Adams Gardens, 1158-1176 West Adams Boulevard (1920), LAHCM No. 297
  - 2666-2668 Magnolia Avenue (1920)
- Harry M. Belden Store Building (1920–1921)
- Paige Agency Auto Dealership (1924)
- Villa Elaine (1925), LAHCM No. 675
- Withers Residence (1926), LAHCM No. 648
- Roosevelt Hospital

== See also ==
- List of American architects
- List of people from Los Angeles
