= Villa Elaine Apartments =

Historic apartment complex in Hollywood, California

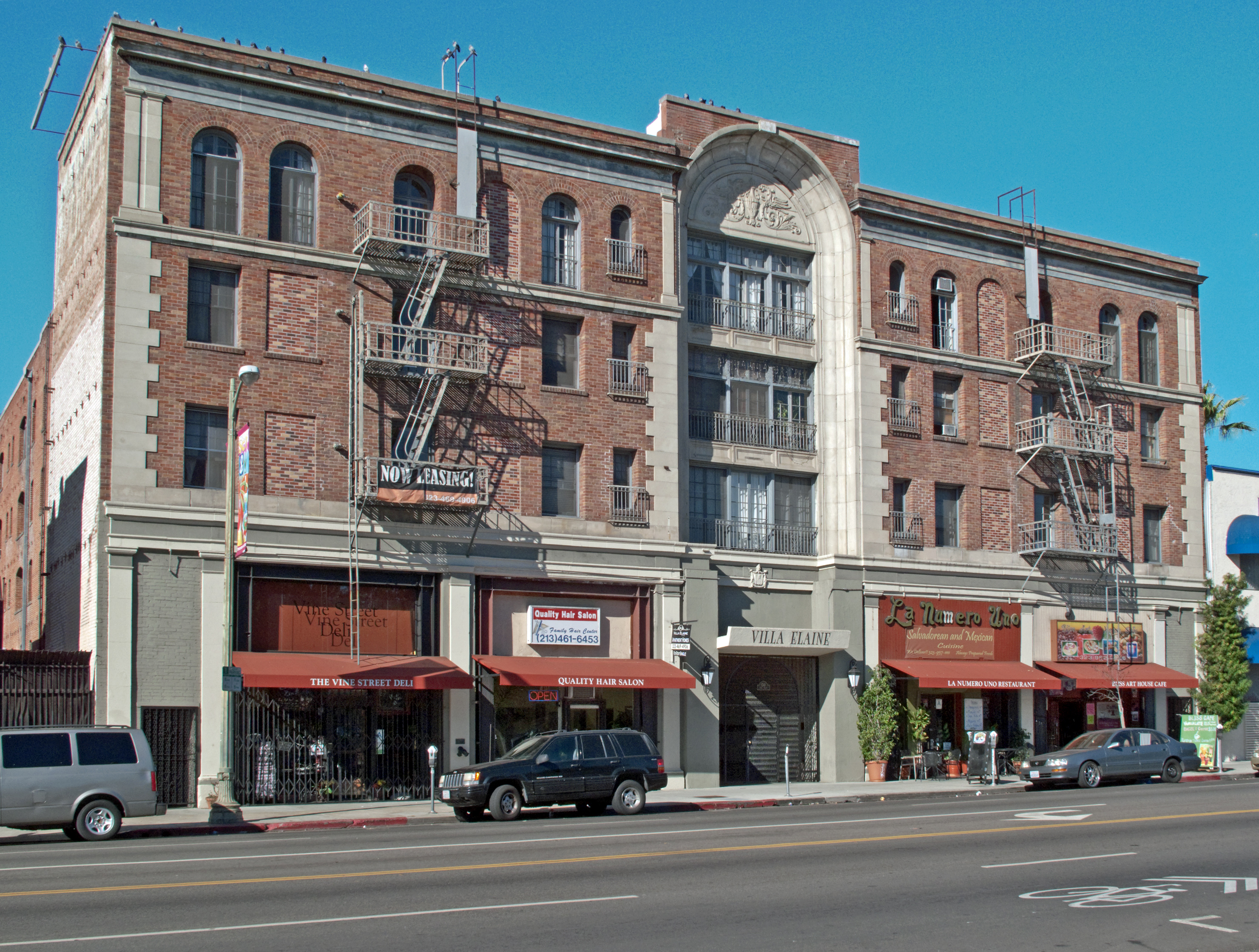
- The building in 2012

General information
- Location: 1241-1249 N. Vine Street, Hollywood, California
- Coordinates: 34.0938°N 118.3273°W
- Year built: 1925
- Owner: Slate Property Group

Technical details
- Floor count: 4

Design and construction
- Architect: Lewis Arthur Smith

Los Angeles Historic-Cultural Monument
- Designated: February 25, 2000
- Reference no.: 675

Villa Elaine Apartments, also known as Villa Elaine Complex or Villa Elaine, is a historic apartment complex located at 1241-1249 N. Vine Street in Hollywood, California.

== History ==
Villa Elaine was designed by Lewis Arthur Smith, an architect known for numerous theaters in the Los Angeles area, and built by Arthur Bard and Company for artist Edna Henderson in 1925. The building, whose budgeted cost was $250,000 ($4.59 million in 2025), featured 103 apartments.

The building's most notable former residents include Man Ray, Orson Welles, and Frank Sinatra. Man Ray's art studio was also in his apartment, and he converted his dining room to a darkroom.

Villa Elaine was designated Los Angeles Historic Cultural Monument No. 675 in February 2000. In 2019, Slate Property Group bought the building and a nearby 55-unit complex for a combined $39.25 million ($49.4 million in 2025).

== Architecture and design ==
Villa Elaine is a four-story Vernacular-designed brick building that features many Renaissance Revival elements, including: symmetrical massing, floors divided by belt courses, rusticated quoins, an entryway framed by pilasters, and variation in window treatment. The building also features a terra cotta facade that includes framing at the top and sides and pilasters with modified Tuscan capitals that separate ground-floor storefronts.

The building's entryway is at ground level, wide, squared, and flanked by structural piers capped by flat blocks. Window treatments on the floors above the entry are identical and the fourth-story window is surmounted by a banded arch with and an incised tympanum featuring stylized carvings around a central urn. Keyblocks atop the arch emanate from the center upward-extending keystone and lock into the attic that extends above the parapet. Brick covers the second, third, and fourth stories on either side of the entry bay, with fenestration arched on the fourth floor and square and quoined at the second and third. Ground-floor storefront windows appear to have been built with transoms and vary in shape and size.

The building is U-shaped and double wing in plan, with apartments that face each other and either open onto or overlook a courtyard. The courtyard is accessed through an arched tunnel between ground-floor storefronts that face Vine Street. Additional apartments are located either above the storefronts and face Vine Street or outside the interior apartments and overlook side yards.

Interior apartment and stairway doors are faced with an elaborate brick design that radiates around a keystone at the top of an arch atop each door. Ground story apartments also feature flat arch casement windows with wood mullions, while the upper-floor apartment windows vary between flat-arched or square.

=== Alterations ===
The building has undergone a seismic retrofit, which required alterations that resulted in loss of architectural integrity. These alterations include: closing and covering several front-facing windows with non-matching brick, closing several interior courtyard windows, retrofitting the upper-story walls with anchors, bracing ground-floor storefronts with steel frames, and replacing each storefront's transom window with fabric.

== In popular culture ==
Villa Elaine was featured in Minnie and Moskowitz and on the cover of Villa Elaine, the latter of which it is also the namesake for.
