= Louis L. Bard =

American theatre owner

Louis L. Bard was an early motion picture theater proprietor in the Los Angeles area. He owned Far West Theatres Incorporated in the 1920s, of which several theaters have become landmarks, most notably The Vista.

== Career ==
Bard opened his first theater, Bard's Hill Street on Hill Street in downtown Los Angeles, in 1920. Bard's second theater, College Theater, was located across the street and was leased shortly after Bard's Hill Street's opening.

Bard opened Bard's Hollywood, also known as Lou Bard Playhouse, at the intersection of Hollywood Boulevard and Sunset Boulevard in 1923. Today it is known as The Vista and owned by Quentin Tarantino.

Bard opened three Egyptian-themed theaters in 1924 and 1925: Bard's Garfield Egyptian on Valley Boulevard in Alhambra, California, Bard's Glendale on Colorado Boulevard in Glendale, California, and Bard's Pasadena on Colorado Boulevard in Pasadena, California. Bard's Pasadena sat nearly two thousand and shortly after opening became one of the most popular theaters in the Los Angeles area. A fourth Egyptian-themed theater, Bard's West Adams located on Adams Boulevard in Los Angeles, began construction in 1924 but did not open until 1926.

Bard's final theater, Bard's Eighth Street, opened on Eighth Street in downtown Los Angeles in 1927.

In 1927, Bard sold the theaters owned through his company Far West Theatres Inc to West Coast Theaters after which, the West Coast Theaters attempted to ignore a provision in the contract that allowed Bard to continue operating Bard's West Adams. The company forcibly ousted Bard from the theater and then obtained a temporary restraining order, after which Bard brought the matter to the courts, who ruled on his behalf.

Many of Bard's theaters were designed by Lewis Arthur Smith and built by Bard's brother Arthur. None of Bard's theaters competed in the first run market, however they did offer current films to the non-first nighter.

== List of theaters operated by Bard ==
Theaters operated by Louis L. Bard include (all in California):

- Bard's Hill Street (1920 — unknown), downtown Los Angeles
- College Theatre (early 1920s — unknown), downtown Los Angeles
- Bard's Hollywood (1923 — 1927), Hollywood
- Bard's Garfield Egyptian (1924 — 1927), Alhambra
- Bard's Glendale (1925 — 1927), Glendale
- Bard's Pasadena (1925 — 1927), Pasadena
- Bard's West Adams (1926 — unknown), south Los Angeles
- Bard's Eighth Street (1927), downtown Los Angeles

== See also ==
- List of people from Los Angeles
