= Regency Academy Cinemas =

Former movie theater in Pasadena, California

Regency Academy Theatre
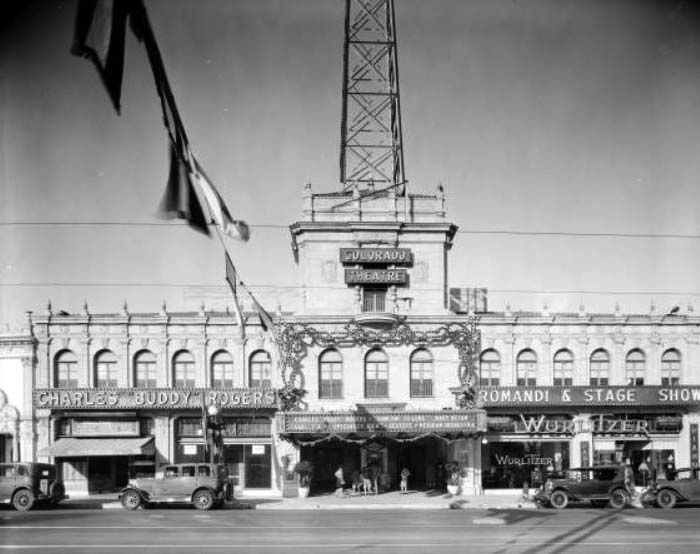
- The theater in 1928
- Interactive map of Regency Academy Theatre
- Former names: Bard's Egyptian Theatre; Bard's Pasadena Theatre
- Address: 1003 E. Colorado Boulevard, Pasadena, California
- Coordinates: 34.1463°N 118.1297°W
- Capacity: 1,709 originally
- Type: Movie theater

Construction
- Opened: June 23, 1925
- Renovated: 1942, 1957-1958, 1984
- Architects: Lewis Arthur Smith (1925); Carl Gerhardt Moeller (1957-1958)

Regency Academy Cinemas, formerly Bard's Egyptian Theatre, Bard's Pasadena Theatre, and Bard's Colorado, also known as Colorado Theatre and Academy 6, is a movie theater located at 1003 E. Colorado Boulevard in Pasadena, California. Shortly after opening it was considered one of the most popular theaters in the Los Angeles area.

== History ==
The theater that would become Regency Academy Cinemas first opened as Bard's Egyptian Theatre on June 23, 1925. The theater was designed by Lewis Arthur Smith, operated by the Louis L. Bard chain Far West Theatres, and its capacity at opening was 1,709. The opening night film was Bobbed Hair.

While operated by Bard's Far West Theatres, this theater became one of the most popular movie theaters in the Los Angeles area. It also showed Pantages vaudeville acts, one of the few theaters outside the city of Los Angeles to do so.

In 1942, Fox West Coast Theaters bought the theater, renovated it, and then re-opened as Academy Cinemas on July 3, 1942. Reap The Wild Wind was the theater's first screening post-remodel, and the theater would go on to host numerous Hollywood premieres throughout the 1950s.

In 1957-1958 the theater underwent a $200,000 ($2.23 million in 2025) Streamline Moderne remodel, done by Carl Gerhardt Moeller, and in 1984, the theater was converted to a six-theater multiplex.

The theater at one point was a Mann Theatre and is currently operated by Regency Theatres as the Regency Academy Cinemas.

== Architecture and design ==
The theater was originally designed in the Egyptian Revival style; however, in 1942, the theater's themed statues were covered with murals of mermaids and underwater scenes. In 1958, the entire theater was redesigned in the Streamline Moderne style and in the 1984, the single theater was split into six, with the theater's former grandeur hidden by plaster after the renovations were complete.
