= Langdon McCormick =

American playwright

Arthur Langdon McCormick
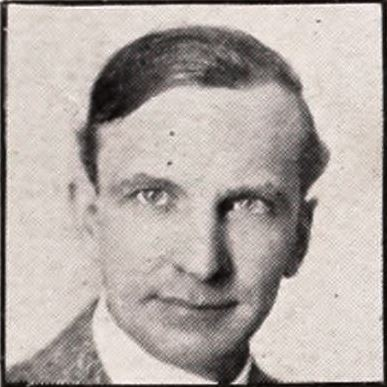
- From a 1922 magazine
- Born: 1873; Port Huron, Michigan, U.S.
- Died: June 25, 1954 (aged 81); New York City, New York, U.S.
- Education: Albion College
- Occupation: Playwright
- Writing career
- Language: English
- Period: 1898–1924

Arthur Langdon McCormick (1873 – June 25, 1954) was an American playwright. He started in theater as an actor before turning to writing. He specialized in melodramas, often with special effects that he designed using his engineering background.

== Early life ==
Born in Port Huron, Michigan, he attended Albion College, then worked as an electrician. He worked briefly for the Thompson Electric Company, then went into business as an independent electrician in Providence, Rhode Island.

== Theatrical career ==
McCormick started his acting career in Chicago, performing scenes he wrote himself. He then spent two years touring in a repertory company with Otis Skinner, who encouraged him to consider writing instead.

He wrote melodramas and eventually gained the nickname "The King of Melodrama". In addition to writing, he often designed lighting and special effects for the productions, which tended to the spectacular. When the World Sleeps in 1905 featured a scene with the heroine trapped in a burning mill. In the Broadway run of The Burglar and the Lady in 1906, a horse and buggy crashed through a window, and the villain had an exploding watch. For A Mile a Minute in 1912, McCormick and magician Howard Thurston designed an effect to represent a train speeding across the stage, which they patented. In 1917, he designed a sinking ship effect for that year's installment of the Ziegfeld Follies. He expanded the effect to include the ship bursting into flames for a vaudeville sketch called On the High Seas, and repeated this in his final production as an author, Shipwrecked, in 1924.

== Works ==
McCormick wrote a number of plays and sketches between 1898 and 1924. Some were never produced on Broadway, but were nonetheless popular in vaudeville and with road companies.

- The Toll Gate Inn (1900)
- Hearts Adrift (1903)
- Out of the Fold (1904)
- When the World Sleeps (1905)
- The Burglar and the Lady (1905)
- How Hearts Are Broken (1906)
- The House of Mystery (1906)
- Our Friend Fritz (1907)
- The Women Who Dare (1907)
- The Life of an Actress (1907)
- Jessie Left the Village (1907) (also known as The Convict and the Girl)
- Wanted by the Police (1908)
- A Mile a Minute (1912)
- The Great Forest Fire (1914)
- On the High Seas (1918)
- The Storm (1919) (also known as Men without Skirts)
- Shipwrecked (1924)
