= Bard's Glendale =

Former movie theater in Glendale, California

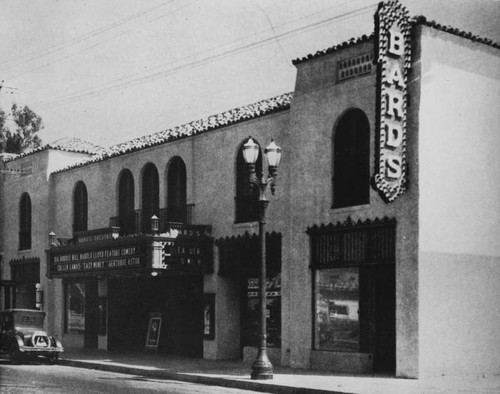
- The theater in 1925
- Interactive map of Bard's Glendale
- Address: 1012 East Colorado Boulevard, Glendale, California
- Coordinates: 34.14595°N 118.12967°W
- Capacity: 1,200
- Type: Movie theater
- Screen: 1

Construction
- Built: 1924—1925
- Opened: October 1925
- Architect: Kenneth A. Gordon

Bard's Glendale, also known as Glendale Bard and Glen Theater, was a movie theater located at 1012 E. Colorado Boulevard in Glendale, California.

== History ==
Bard's Glendale was designed by Kenneth A. Gordon and built by J. H. Woodworth between 1924 and 1925. The theater, operated by Louis L. Bard's Far West Theatres, sat 1,200, cost $150,000 ($2.82 million in 2025) to construct, and was built on land owned by M. G. Khodigian. It opened with a showing of Pathe News, a Felix the Cat cartoon, a comedy short and the feature Speed. Local city council member C. E. Kimlin attended the opening.

The theater changed names to Glen Theater after Bard's lease ended. The theater closed in 1956 or 1957 and was later converted to a bowling alley and then a nightclub and restaurant.

== Architecture and design ==
Bard's Glendale was located in a two-story building that also contained four 86x170 feet storefronts and additional offices. One office was occupied by Bob Wian, creator of Bob's Big Boy, the first of which was located down the block.

Bard's Glendale featured a Wurlitzer organ and an Egyptian motif.
