= Tivoli, Karnataka =

Coordinates: 15°34′N 74°28′E

Tivoli (ತಿವೋಲಿ)
- Village
- Interactive map of Tivoli
- Country: India
- State: Karnataka
- District: Belgaum
- Talukas: Khanapur

Government
  - Type: Panchayat raj
  - Body: Gram panchayat

Languages
  - Official: Kannada
- Time zone: UTC+5:30 (IST)
- ISO 3166 code: IN-KA
- Vehicle registration: KA
- Website: karnataka.gov.in

Tivoli is a village in Belgaum district of Karnataka, India.
