= El Portal Theater =

Three-theater performing arts complex in Los Angeles, California

- Jewel in the North Hollywood Crown
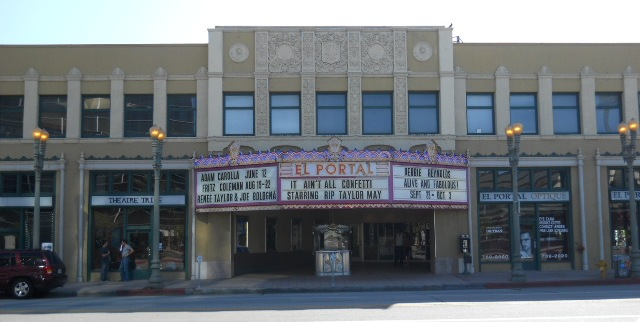
- The theater in 2010

- Location within the Los Angeles metropolitan area
- Location: 5265-5271 Lankershim Boulevard and 11200-11220 Weddington Street, North Hollywood, CA 91601
- Coordinates: 34.167°N 118.376°W
- Capacity: 1400 - original 360 - MainStage (current); 96 - Monroe Forum (current); 42 - Theatre Tribe (current)
- Type: Performing arts complex
- Public transit: North Hollywood

Construction
- Opened: 1926, 2000
- Renovated: 1950, late 1990s

Website
- elportaltheatre.com

Los Angeles Historic-Cultural Monument
- Designated: February 9, 1993
- Reference no.: 573
- Architect: Lewis Arthur Smith
- Architectural style: Art Deco/Spanish Renaissance Revival

El Portal Theater, also known as El Portal Center for the Arts, is a historic theater located at 5265-5271 Lankershim Boulevard and 11200-11220 Weddington Street in North Hollywood, California. Built as a single theater in 1926, the venue was rebuilt as a three-theater performing arts complex in the late 1990s. It was designated Los Angeles Historic-Cultural Monument #573 in 1993.

== History ==
El Portal Theater was designed by Lewis Arthur Smith in the Spanish Renaissance Revival style with a neon art deco marquee. Built in 1926, it originally opened as a 1400-seat vaudeville theater, but soon after was converted to a movie palace, first for silent and then Academy Award-winning films. Its first film screening was Ralph Graves's Blarney.

In the 1930s, Works Progress Administration artists led by Anthony Heinsbergen added bas-relief artwork to the building's lobby, the artwork illustrating moments in California history, including the Gold Rush, citrus harvests, and more.

The theater was originally operated by West Coast Theatres, then Fox West Coast Theatres who in 1950 "obliterated" the theater's original decorations with drapes and curtain material. Later, the theater was taken over by National General, then Mann Theatres, then in 1978 by Metropolitan Theatres who used the theater to screen Spanish language films.

The theater was designated Los Angeles Historic-Cultural Monument #573 in 1993, and in 1994, the Northridge earthquake caused extensive damage to the theater, including cracked side-walls and a collapsed ceiling. The theater was then rebuilt as a three-theater performing arts complex that opened in January 2000 featuring the 42-seat Studio Theatre, 95-seat Forum, 360-seat MainStage, and Judith Kaufman Art Gallery. Little remains of the theater's former interior, while the facade, marquee, and paybox were retained.

== In popular culture ==
El Portal Theater has been featured in numerous film and television productions, including Glee, Modern Family, Billy Glimmer, Criminal Minds, Desperate Housewives, The Biggest Loser, all three CSIs, Jimmy Kimmel Live!, The Ghost Whisperer, Sarah Silverman's Jesus is Magic, Last Comic Standing, R&B Divas, Wendy Liebman's I Look Taller on TV, Licorice Pizza, and more. Additionally, the 2012 and 2013 reunion and finale episodes of RuPaul's Drag Race were shot on the El Portal MainStage.

Donald O'Conner performed in this theater as a toddler, and in 1999 he returned to receive a lifetime achievement award.
