= Vista Theatre (Los Angeles) =

Movie theater in Los Angeles

- Lou Bard Playhouse; Bard's Hollywood Theatre; Vista Continental; The Vista
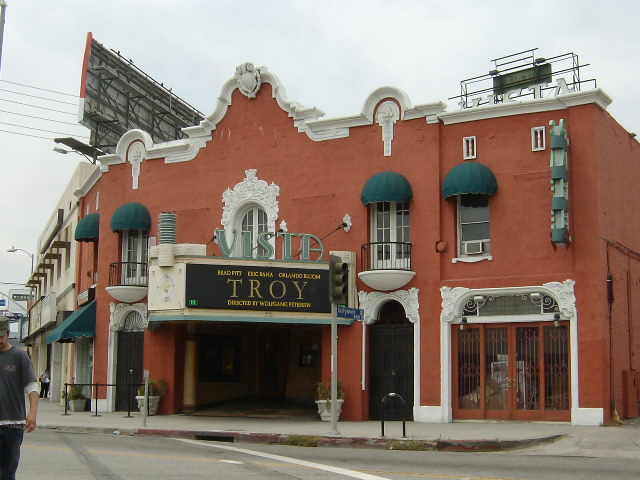
- The theatre in 2005.
- Interactive map of Vista Theatre
- Address: 4473 Sunset Drive; Los Angeles, California
- Coordinates: 34.0984°N 118.2869°W
- Owner: Quentin Tarantino
- Operator: Vista Theater Inc.
- Capacity: 400
- Type: Movie theater

Construction
- Opened: October 9, 1923
- Reopened: 2023
- Architect: Lewis Arthur Smith

Website
- www.vistatheaterhollywood.com

Vista Theatre (formerly Lou Bard Playhouse, Bard's Hollywood Theatre and Vista Continental), also known as The Vista, is a historic single-screen movie theater in Los Angeles, California, located in Los Feliz on the border with East Hollywood. Since 2021, it has been owned by filmmaker Quentin Tarantino.

== History ==
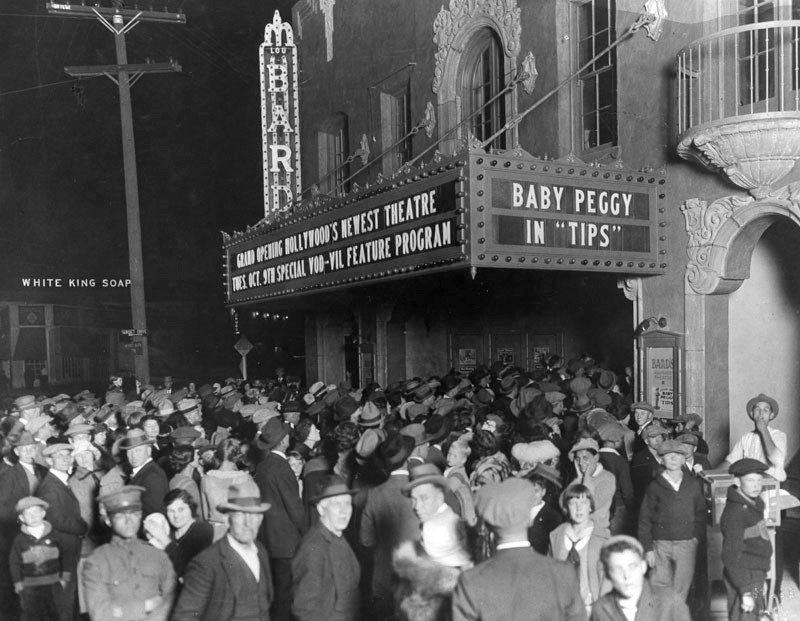
Opening of Lou Bard Playhouse, 1923.

Located at the intersection of Sunset Boulevard and Hollywood Boulevard in East Hollywood, Los Angeles, the location first came to prominence when director D.W. Griffith built an antebellum town set there for his controversial 1915 film The Birth of a Nation, often regarded as the first "blockbuster". Louis L. Bard later chose the intersection, referred to as "the great crossroads of Los Angeles", to be the location for the next theater in his chain.

=== Design ===
The Vista was designed by architect Lewis A. Smith, and presents a hybrid of two different styles: while the exterior was designed first and sports a Spanish Mission Revival style, the interior features an Egyptian Revival style, inspired by the later excavation of King Tut's tomb in 1922. The theater's forecourt features cement handprints and footprints of notable film figures.

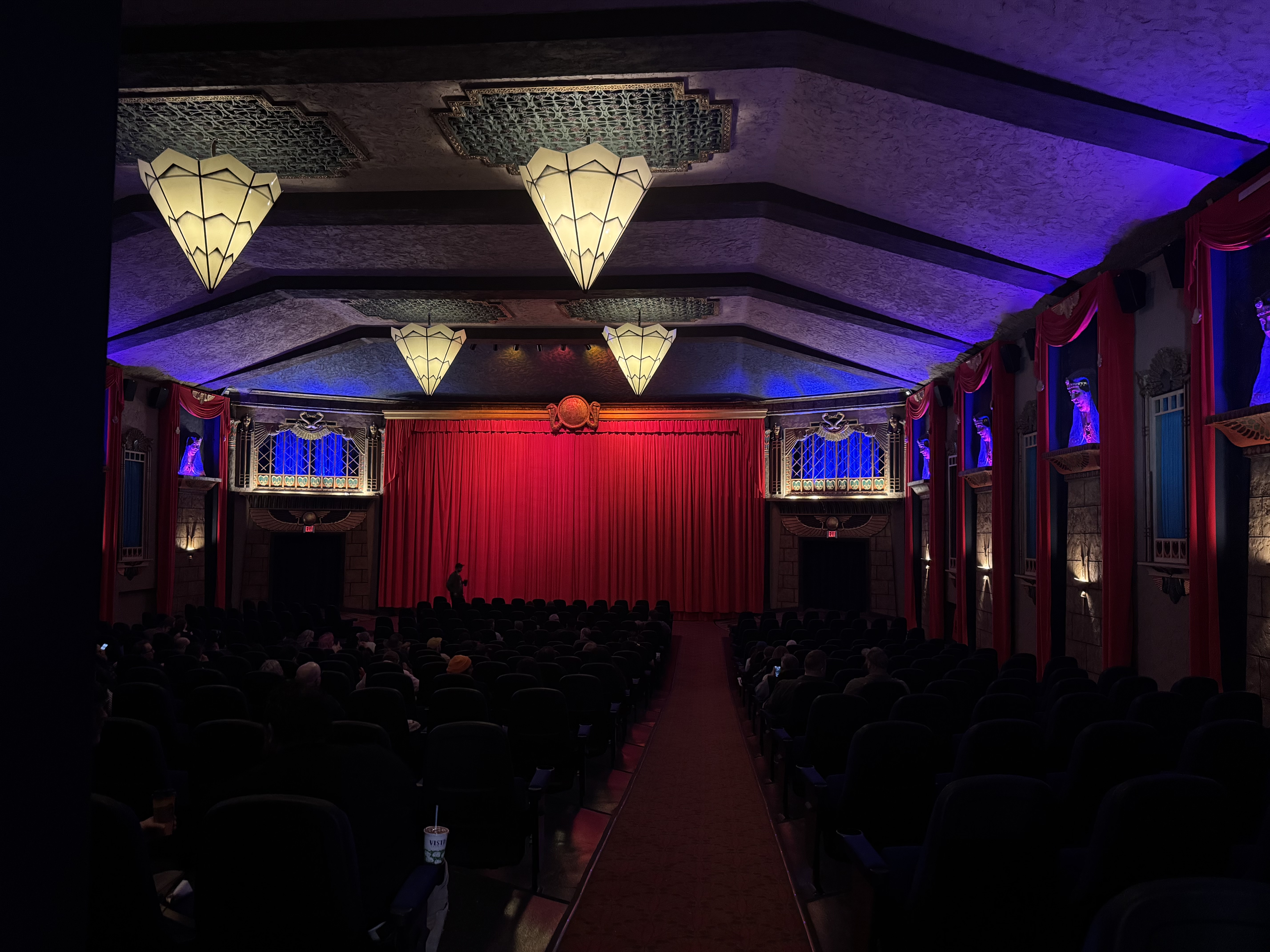
Interior of the theatre.

The Vista is one of the remaining historic structures from the 1920s, when Hollywood was first developed and began attracting residents to its new suburban homes from areas near downtown Los Angeles and East Los Angeles, which, at the time, were middle-class and wealthy areas of Los Angeles.

=== Opening ===
The Vista opened on October 9, 1923, as a single-screen, 838-seat theater, known as either the Lou Bard Playhouse or Bard's Hollywood. The cinema's first screening was the film Tips, starring Baby Peggy. In addition to screening films, the theater also featured vaudeville acts on its stage. After experiencing only modest success, Bard sold the theater in 1927, when it was rebranded as the Vista. Eventually, every other row of seats in the theater was removed to allow for increased legroom, reducing the number of seats to 400.

=== Later ownership ===
In the 1950s, the Vista reopened as the Vista Continental and was the only southern California theater to screen films from the Soviet Union, a decision met with controversy in the midst of the Cold War. In the 1960s, the theater also courted controversy when they began screening pornographic films, including those with same-sex themes, which continued until its refurbishment by Thomas Theaters in 1980. It also showed gay-oriented non-pornographic films, including the local premiere of The Times of Harvey Milk in 1984.

After going through a number of different owners, the Vista was purchased by Landmark Theatres in 1982, but business declined with the advent and rise of home video. In 1997, it was acquired by Lance Alspaugh's Vintage Theater Group, who focused on "community outreach" and often rented the theater out for weddings, late night screenings, local premieres and other events.

The Vista has drawn many famous actors and directors to attend, host, or sometimes surprise audiences at screenings of their films there: Taika Waititi, Chris Hemsworth, Tessa Thompson, John Cho, Lupita Nyong'o, Anne Hathaway and Zoë Kravitz have attended screenings of their films at the Vista since 2018.

The theater closed indefinitely in 2020, due to the COVID-19 pandemic.

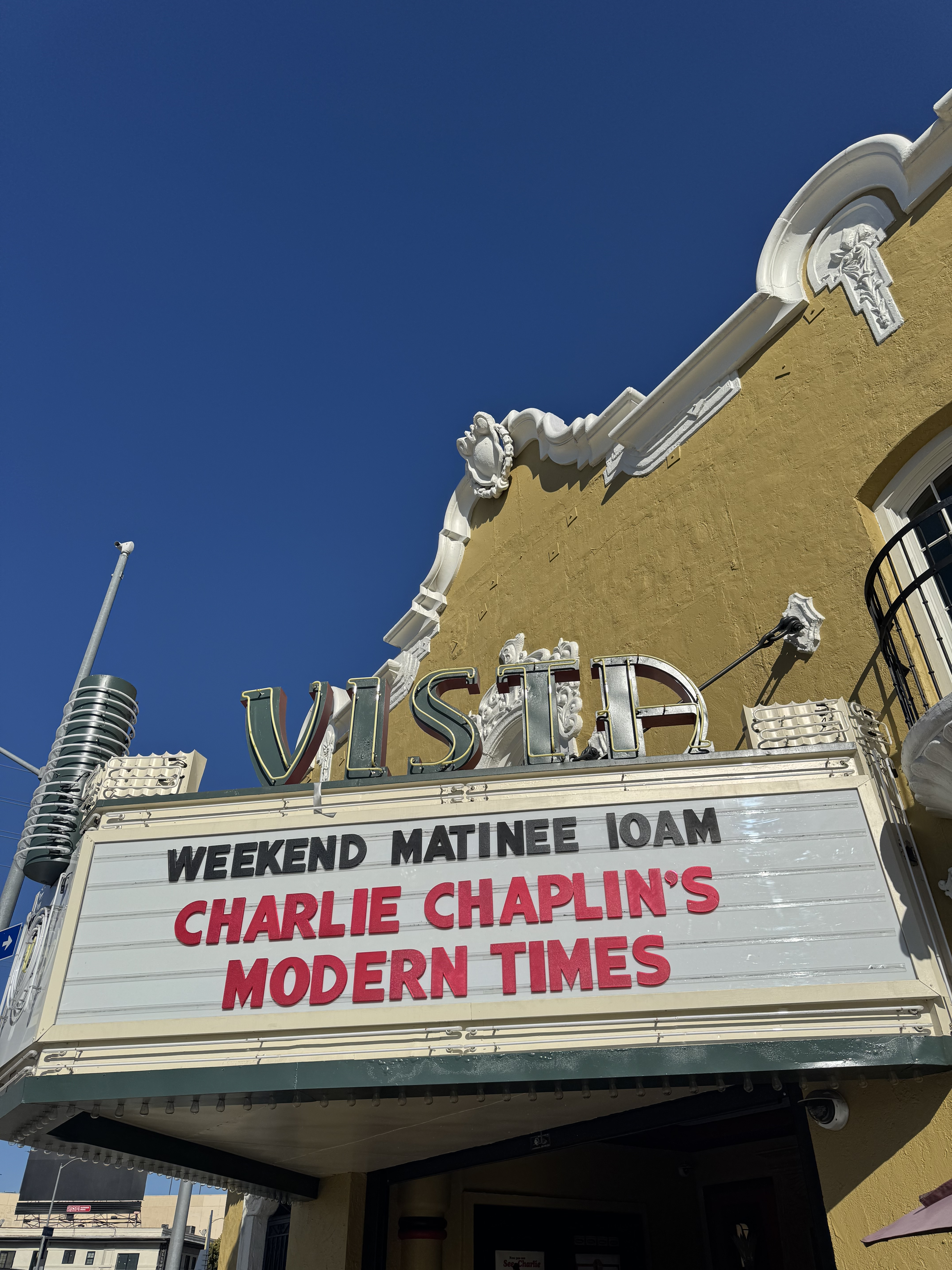
The theatre's marquee exhibiting a showing of Modern Times.

=== Quentin Tarantino ownership ===
In July 2021, director Quentin Tarantino revealed that he had purchased the theater and intended to screen titles only on film, but added that, unlike his other theater, the New Beverly Cinema, it would not be a revival house. The theater also announced plans to sell beer and wine and open an arcade featuring 12 games.

The Vista officially reopened on November 17, 2023. Under Tarantino's ownership, the Vista incorporated a new 70 mm film projection system and new sound system, and screens only on film, rather than digital, with an emphasis on first-run releases and occasional classics. A 35mm VistaVision projector was installed for the presentation of the 2025 film One Battle After Another, as the film had been shot in that format, making it one of only four cinemas in the world currently capable of screening VistaVision. The theater began operating a cafe, Pam's Coffy, named after Pam Grier's 1973 film Coffy. It also hosts the Video Archives Cinema Club, a 20-seat micro-cinema named after Video Archives, screening films on 16mm and VHS.

== In popular culture ==
=== Film and television ===
The "Walls of Babylon" scenes from D. W. Griffith's film Intolerance (1916) were filmed on the site before the theater was constructed, and the completed theater first appeared in the film The Crooked Web (1955).

In 1980, the theater was featured as the "Starbrite" in season 4, episode 16 of the TV show Charlie's Angels. The theater has also made appearances in the TV series Southland and Lethal Weapon, and in the made-for-television film Return to the Batcave: The Misadventures of Adam and Burt (2003).

The Vista also appeared in the films Throw Momma From the Train (1987), The Big Picture (1989), True Romance (1993), Get Shorty (1995), Café Society (2016), and The Idea of You (2024). The interior appears in Scream 2 (1997), although the exterior is the Rialto Theatre in Pasadena.

=== Music ===
The Vista is pictured on the cover of Suicidal Tendencies' album Lights...Camera...Revolution! (1990). Both the exterior and interior of the Vista appears in the 1997 music video for Violent Femmes' song "Blister in the Sun". It also appears in the nighttime portions of the music video for Pharrell Williams's 2013 song "Happy". On December 15, 2021, the Vista appeared in a new official music video for George Harrison's 1970 song "My Sweet Lord", directed by Lance Bangs and created as part of the ongoing 50th anniversary campaign for Harrison's album All Things Must Pass (1970).
