= Ventura Theatre =

Historical concert venue in California

Coordinates: 34°16′49″N 119°17′29″W

- Majestic Ventura Theatre
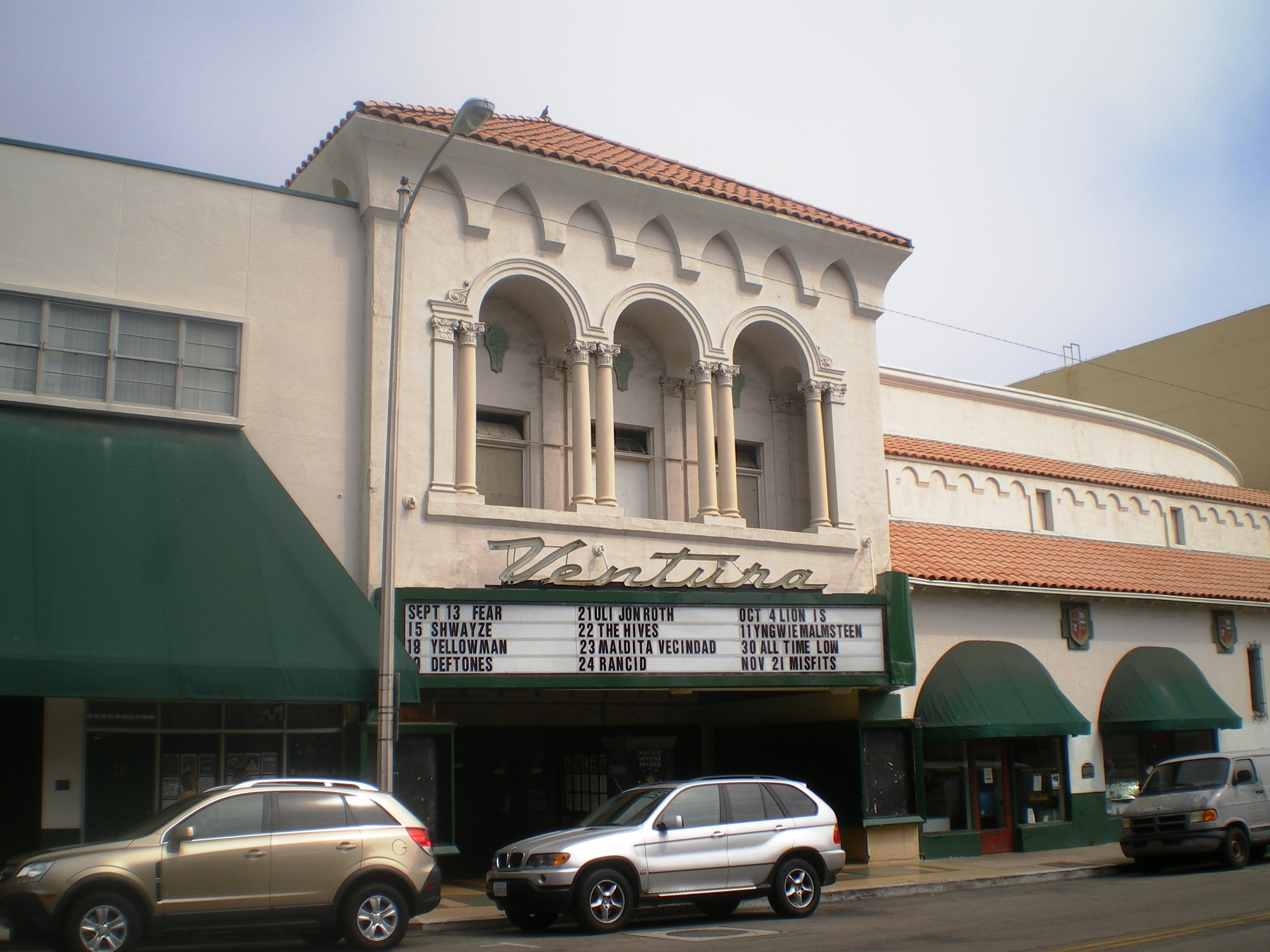
- Interactive map of Ventura Theatre
- Address: 26 S Chestnut St; Ventura, CA 93001-2800
- Location: Greater Los Angeles
- Capacity: 1,150

Construction
- Opened: August 1928
- Architect: Lewis Arthur Smith

Website
- Venue Website
- Ventura Theatre
- U.S. National Register of Historic Places
- Area: 0.7 acres (0.28 ha)
- Architectural style: Spanish Colonial Revival
- NRHP reference No.: 86003523
- Added to NRHP: December 29, 1986

The Ventura Theatre is a historic live concert venue in downtown Ventura, California. This was "the only luxury theatre built in Ventura County in the 1920s in the "style of the great movie palaces." The lavish, elegant interior of gilt and opulence was originally designed by Robert E. Power Studios of San Francisco and has been restored. The theatre with a capacity of 1,150 and a flanking office building were designed by Lewis Arthur Smith in the Spanish Colonial Revival architecture that was favored by architects of motion picture theaters during the 1920s.

In 1928, Ventura was a bustling oil boom town when the grand opening featured an organ solo, the latest news, Our Gang comedies, a vaudeville act and the movie Excess Baggage. During the period between 1923 and 1929, many other buildings were constructed: the Hobson Brothers Meat Packing Company (1923), the First National Bank of Ventura (1926) (commonly called the Erle Stanley Gardner), the Ventura Hotel (1926), the Elks Lodge - B. P. 0. E. #1430 (1928), the Mission Theater (1928), the Hotel Washington (1928), the Swift & Company Building (1928), and the Masonic Temple (1929). Contemporary downtown Ventura is defined by the theatre and the other extant buildings from this period.

Declared a landmark by the City of Ventura In 1976, the theatre was added to the National Register of Historic Places in 1986. The office building was modernized in 1958 and was not included in the historic designation. The theater currently has an active concert schedule.

== See also ==
- City of Ventura Historic Landmarks and Districts
- National Register of Historic Places listings in Ventura County, California
