= Rialto Theatre (South Pasadena, California) =

Theater in South Pasadena, California, US

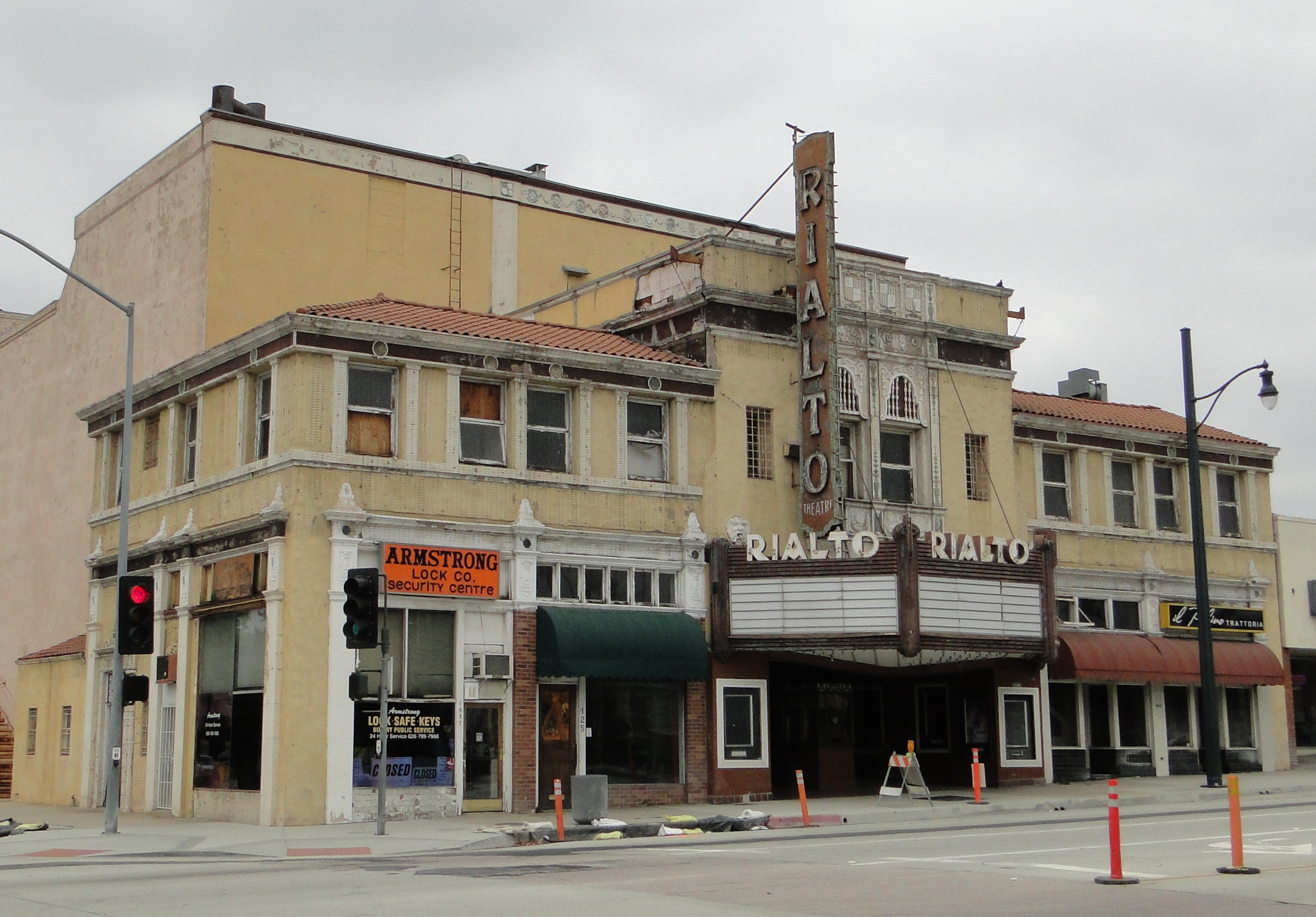
- Interactive map of Rialto Theatre
- Address: 1019-1023 Fair Oaks Ave. South Pasadena, California
- Coordinates: 34.1140°N 118.1508°W
- Owner: Izek Shomof
- Capacity: 1200

Construction
- Architect: Lewis Arthur Smith
- General contractor: William G. Reed
- Rialto Theatre
- U.S. National Register of Historic Places
- Built: 1925; 101 years ago
- Architectural style: Moorish Revival
- NRHP reference No.: 78000700
- Added to NRHP: May 24, 1978

The Rialto Theatre is a 1,200-seat theater in South Pasadena, California. Located on Fair Oaks Avenue, it is considered one of the last single-screen theaters in Southern California and is listed on the National Register of Historic Places.

== History ==
The Rialto was designed in 1925 by Lewis Arthur Smith, who designed the Vista Theater. The Rialto's architectural style was described in The Los Angeles Times as "an odd mashup of Spanish Baroque and Egyptian kitsch." The theater has an orchestra pit and its original design featured balcony seating along both sides of a deep stage. It also featured a theater organ to provide music for silent films, and weekend shows were sometimes preceded by vaudeville acts. The interior has several original murals and a drinking fountain made of Batchelder tile.

The Rialto was operated by Landmark Theatres until it closed in 2007. The Simpsons Movie was the last film shown in the theater, and 200 people attended the final screening. The building was closed to the public in 2010, after part of the facade fell onto the sidewalk. There have been two fires in the building, and it survived an attempt in 1977 to turn it into a parking lot.

Izek Shomof, a developer of older buildings in downtown Los Angeles, purchased the Rialto in December 2014. Shomof indicated he will turn the property into an entertainment venue that will include a bar and possibly a theater to screen old movies.

Since 2017, the theater has served as one of six campuses for Mosaic, a non-denominational multi-site church based in Los Angeles.

== In popular culture ==
In 1983's Michael Jackson's Thriller, the scene in which Michael and Ola Ray watch a film was shot at the theatre. In 2016 the Rialto was featured as a location in key scenes of the hit movie musical La La Land. It was also used as a filming location in The Rocketeer (1991), The Player (1992) and Scream 2 (1997).
