= United Artists Theatre =

United Artists Theatres is a movie theater brand established in 1924 and was acquired by Regal Cinemas in 2002. Several of its locations still or formerly bore the name United Artists Theatre:

- United Artists Theatre (Chicago), Illinois
- United Artists Theatre Building, Detroit, Michigan
- United Artists Theatre (Los Angeles), California
- United Artists Theatre (Louisville, Kentucky)
- United Artists Pasadena Theater, Pasadena, California
- Loew's and United Artists' Penn Theatre, Pittsburgh, Pennsylvania
- United Artists Theatre (Portland, Oregon)
- United Artists Theatre (San Francisco), California
- UA Movies 12 at The Falls, Kendall, Florida
- UA Movies at Harbor Park 9, Baltimore, Maryland
- UA Movies at Marley Station 8, Glen Burnie, Maryland
