= Clune's Pasadena =

Former movie theater in Pasadena, California

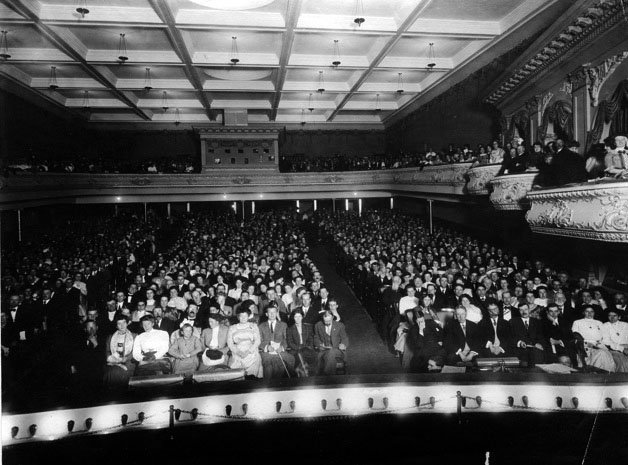
- The theater's opening in 1911
- Interactive map of Clune's Pasadena
- Address: 61 West Colorado Boulevard, Pasadena, California
- Coordinates: 34.1462°N 118.1519°W
- Capacity: 1,194
- Type: Movie theater
- Screen: 1

Construction
- Opened: March 1911
- Renovated: 1930
- Closed: 1953 or 1957
- Architects: Balch and Stanbery (1930 remodel)

Clune's Pasadena, also known as Fox Pasadena, Jensen's Pasadena, and T. D. & L. Pasadena, was a movie theater located at 61 W. Colorado Boulevard in Pasadena, California.

== History ==
W. H. Clune opened Clune's Pasadena in 1911, months after his flagship theater opened in downtown Los Angeles's Broadway Theater District. This theater's opening consisted of live acts, including singer Lilly Dorn, storyteller Frank M. Clark, and a saxophone sextet.

Clune's Pasadena and three nearby theaters were bought by Turner & Dahnken in 1921. This theater was remodeled by Balch and Stanbery for Fox West Coast Theaters in 1930.

The theater closed in 1953 or 1957.

== Architecture and design ==
Clune's Pasadena featured a rooftop sign with over 2,000 lamps and ground-floor stores next to the theater.
