= Fox Theatre (Visalia, California) =

Theater in Visalia, California, United States

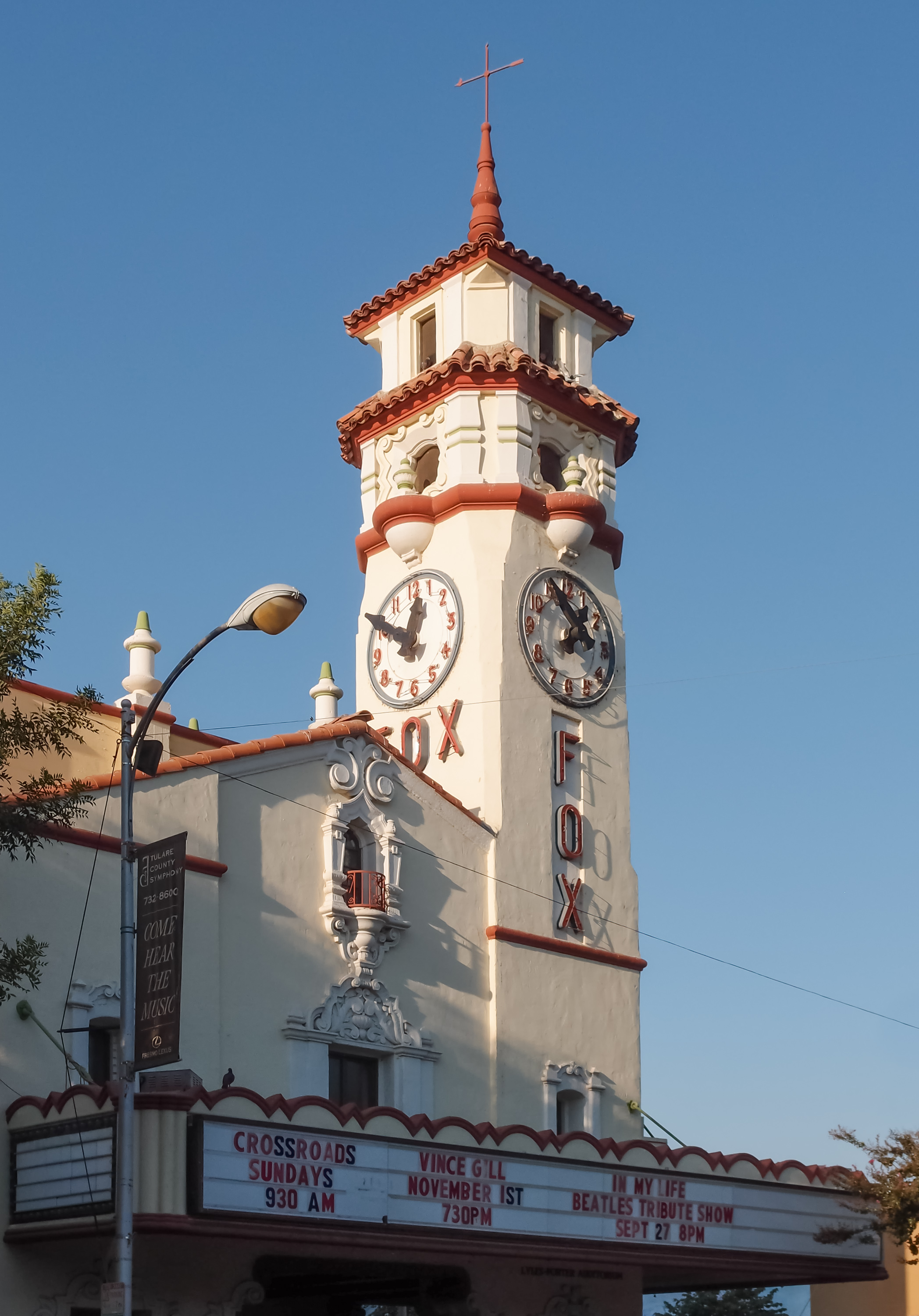
- Visalia Fox Theatre, 2013
- Interactive map of Fox Theatre
- Address: 308 West Main Street; Visalia, California
- Coordinates: 36.3302°N 119.2948°W
- Capacity: 1,275

Construction
- Opened: February 27, 1930
- Reopened: November 20, 1999
- Years active: 1930-1996; 1999-present
- Architect: Balch and Stanbery

Website
- www.foxvisalia.org

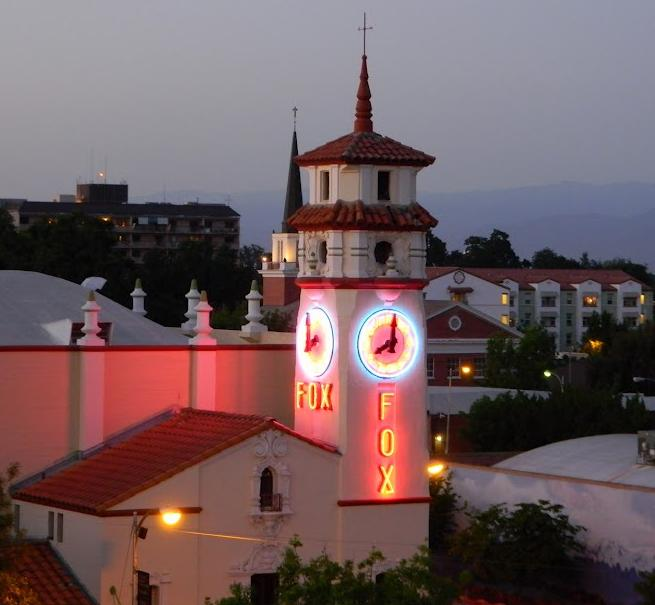
Fox Theatre at night, 2009

The Visalia Fox Theatre is a landmark movie palace and theater in downtown Visalia, California. Opened in 1930 as a part of the Fox Theatre chain, it was converted to a three screen multiplex in 1976. After a brief closure in the late 1990s, it was restored by a community group and reopened in 1999 as a live performance auditorium with a seating capacity of 1,275.

== Background ==
Designed and constructed from 1929-30 by Los Angeles-based architect Clifford Balch and engineer Floyd E. Stanbery, the Visalia Fox Theatre was erected at the end of the Silent Film era at a cost of $225,000 (2.9 million in 2010 dollars). It is one of many such theaters throughout the United States and Canada built by William Fox and his Fox Film Corporation, later to become 20th Century Fox.

The Fox Theatre opened on February 27, 1930. Opening night featured a talkie western, a newsreel, a Mickey Mouse cartoon and a Laurel and Hardy comedy. The theatre and the streets around it were packed for the premiere—quite a feat in a town of 7,000—an indication of the central role it would play in the community for decades to come.

The Fox would remain a one-screen auditorium theater for over 45 years until 1976, when most movie theaters were becoming multiplexes. Having been purchased by the expanding Mann Theater corporation, and in order to stay in competition with two triplex movie theatres opening in Visalia around the same time, the one-auditorium was split into three screens. The ground level of the theatre was divided into two auditoriums, with two different screens, while the balcony of the theater became the third auditorium. The Fox would continue with this format showing first-run movies for 20 years until late 1996, when Mann built a 12-screen multiplex in the Sequoia Mall on the other side of town. With the opening of the new multiplex, Mann shut down the doors to the Fox after 66 years of showing movies. It wasn't very long before the Fox would be restored to its same mint condition as the day it opened in 1930.

== Description ==
John Margolies roadside photo collection, 1987

2003

The Fox is an atmospheric theatre designed to evoke the feeling of being outside in a far-away place. This style of movie theater was common during the Roaring Twenties and into the Great Depression, when they were particularly popular as a fantastical escape from harsh realities outside.

Atmospheric theatres were created to be unique experiences. Each was made with a different theme in mind, and the interior of the Visalia Fox emulates a temple garden in India or South Asia. The ceiling is dotted with stars which flicker and glow during movies and performances to give the appearance of a clear night sky. There are elaborate "temples" or "pagodas" flanked by murals on either side of the stage, and a hand-sculpted genie—a fearsome face between two elephants—above the proscenium arch.

The theater's interior incorporates trompe-l'œil, an artistic technique that creates the illusion of three-dimensional object or architectural features. Common at the beginning of the culture industry and the Golden Age of Hollywood, this kitsch approach to construction was a simple function of finances and practicability. As the studios stepped up competition for the attention and admiration of their audiences, hundreds upon thousands of elaborate environments were erected across the world. Architects and contractors eschewed prohibitively expensive materials like high-quality wood, gold leaf, and marble for more reasonably-priced ingredients like plaster and paint.

== Restoration ==
The Fox was shuttered in November 1996 and remained closed until a group of nostalgic community members known as "Friends of the Fox" took up the task of acquiring and restoring the decaying theatre. The clock tower, long neglected, was filled with years of pigeon filth; the giant six-foot clock—a nuisance to keep on-time even in its heyday—was meticulously reassembled by a local engineer and the clock's former keeper. Much of the intricate interior of the building was destroyed in 1976 by the hasty conversion to a three screen multiplex. The genie above the stage was delicately and painstakingly re-sculpted by a local volunteer using old pictures as a template. Most of the murals needed repainting, and countless flourishes and decorations needed replacing. After three years and an outpouring of support from Visalia and surrounding communities, the restoration was complete. Marvin Hamlisch played the Grand Re-Opening to a sold-out house on November 20, 1999.

The theater remains a defining feature of the community. Nearly all of the Tulare County Symphony performances are held at the Fox. Films are also still shown at the theater on occasion, notably classic films, many of which were shown at the theatre many years prior when they were in first run.

== See also ==
- Fox Theatres
- Hanford Fox Theatre
- Bakersfield Fox Theatre
- Fox Oakland Theatre
- Fullerton Fox Theatre
- Pomona Fox Theater
- San Francisco Fox Theatre (Demolished)
