= Market Street Cinema =

Former building in the United States

- Imperial Theater
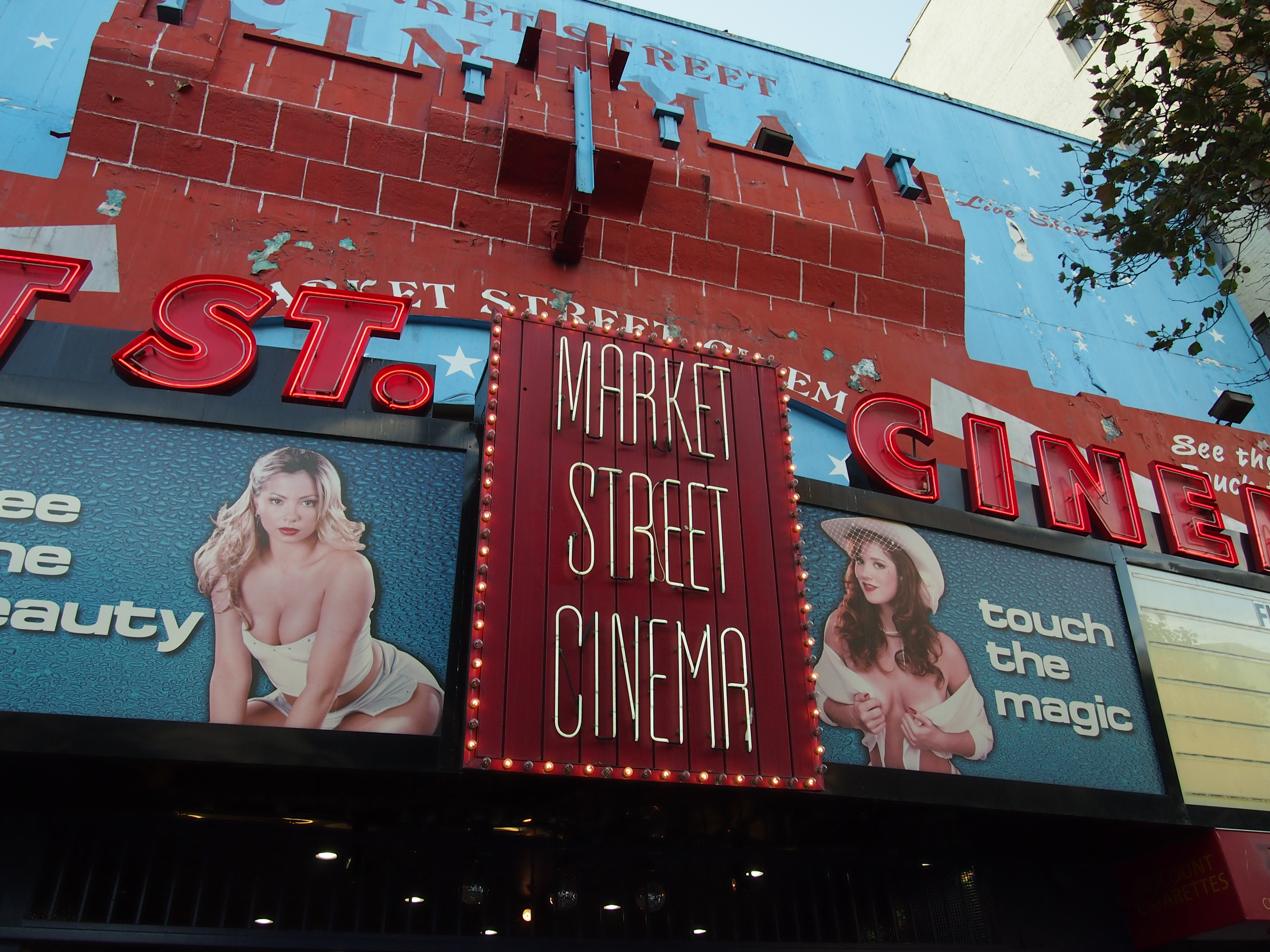
- Market Street Cinema in 2012
- Interactive map of Market Street Cinema
- Address: 1077 Market Street; San Francisco
- Coordinates: 37.780834°N 122.4139685°W
- Capacity: 1,485

Construction
- Opened: December 22, 1912
- Closed: February 2013
- Demolished: July 2016
- Years active: 101
- Architect: Clifford A. Balch

Market Street Cinema was a historical theater located on Market Street in the Mid-Market district, San Francisco, California. It was founded in 1912 by David and Sid Grauman as the Imperial Theater. It was converted into a movie theatre as the Premiere Theatre (1929) and the United Artists Theatre (1931).

The benefit world premiere of Dirty Harry was held here on December 22, 1971.

In 1972 it was purchased by adult film producer Mike Weldon (Skintight, 1979), and renamed Market Street Cinema and was used through the early 2000s as an adult entertainment venue. It was one of the first adult venues that allow "lap dancing," where the club's dancers would wander the crowd looking for tips by sitting on the laps of customers. Mike Weldon was sued by the Justice Department for "pimping," but repeatedly won the lawsuits given participants remained clothed during encounters, and the 'lap dances" were not "negotiated sex-acts." The role of the theater in San Francisco's sex industry in the 1980s was documented in a photo essay by photographer Leon Mostovoy. In October 2015, the San Francisco Planning Commission approved a plan to demolish the theatre and replace it with an eight-story building. It was demolished in July 2016.

Market Street Cinema is considered haunted in popular culture: it features in a 2013 episode of Ghost Adventures (season 7, episode 25) and was used as a shooting location by filmmaker Charles Webb for a low-budget horror movie called G-String Horror.

On August 15, 2016, Mint Minx Press published the novella Market Street Cinema by author Michele Machado, narrating the fictional account of a dancer working at the club in 1998.

== See also ==
- List of strip clubs
- Mitchell Brothers O'Farrell Theatre
