= W. H. Clune =

American film producer

- Born: William H. Clune; August 18, 1862; Hannibal, Missouri
- Died: October 18, 1927 (aged 65); Los Angeles, California
- Occupations: Property developer, theatre and studio owner, and film producer

William H. Clune (August 18, 1862 – October 18, 1927) was an American railroad property developer, film exchange and then theater chain owner, film studio owner, and film producer.

== Career ==
Born in Hannibal, Missouri, Clune owned a chain of theaters in Southern California. He launched his studio in 1915. His film productions were based on novels. His first production was 1916's Ramona.

He played hardball with competitors. He came into dispute with Nell Shipman over their film projects together.

He died in Los Angeles, two months past his 65th birthday. He is buried at the Hollywood Forever Cemetery in a crypt.

Clune was an investor in Epoch Film Producing Corp. The Birth of a Nation, originally released as The Clansman in February 1915, had its world premiere at Clune's Auditorium on Pershing Square in the Core of Los Angeles.

== Filmography ==
- Ramona (1916), based the book Ramona by Helen Hunt Jackson about life in California's early days
- The Eyes of the World (1917), filmed in Redlands, California, adapted from the Harold Bell Wright's novel The Eyes of the World
- From Manger to Cross
- A Bear, a Boy and a Dog by Nell Shipman
- The Girl From God's Country (1920)

== Theaters ==
The following theaters (in Los Angeles unless otherwise noted) were part of Clune's movie theater chain:

- Clune's Downtown (1909–1914), 453 South Main Street
- Clune's Exclusive (1909), 547 S. Broadway
- Clune's Broadway (1910), 528 S. Broadway
- Clune's Pasadena (1911), 61 W. Colorado Blvd, Pasadena
- Clune's Auditorium (1910s), 5th and Olive
