= Four Star Theater =

Former movie theater in Los Angeles, California

Four Star Theatre
- Interactive map of Four Star Theatre
- Former names: United Artists Theater
- Address: 5112 Wilshire Boulevard, Los Angeles, California
- Coordinates: 34.0620°N 118.3412°W
- Capacity: 900
- Type: Movie theater
- Screen: 1

Construction
- Built: 1932
- Opened: November 29, 1933
- Closed: 1997
- Demolished: 2015
- Architects: Clifford Balch; Walker & Eisen

Four Star Theatre was a movie theater located at 5112 Wilshire Boulevard, on the corner of Wilshire and Mansfield, in Los Angeles, California.

== History ==
Four Star Theatre was one of 13 theaters designed for United Artists by Clifford Balch and Walker and Eisen. It was owned by lawyer Albert Lee Stephens, Sr. and leased to United Artists. Construction of the theater and accompanying storefronts was budgeted at $89,000 ($2.1 million in 2025). The theater, with a seating capacity of 900, opened with a screening of Berkeley Square on November 29, 1933.

Four Star Theatre was a popular film premiere location during its early years. It hosted the West Coast premieres of films such as Lost Horizon in 1937, In Old Chicago in 1938, The Grapes of Wrath in 1940 and That Hamilton Woman in 1941, as well as a press preview of Gone With the Wind in 1939. The theater was operated by Fox West Coast Theaters from the late 1930s through the 1940s, when United Artists again took control. United Artists continued operating the theater into the 1970s, when it was showing repertory films on 70mm.

The theater and its neighboring building underwent a $30,000 remodel in 1962 ($319,307 in 2025). It was subleased to the Mitchell Brothers in 1973 and operated as an adult movie theater until June 1976, when Stephens objected to the sublease. Stephens sold the theater in 1978 in response to the scandal and it was sold again one year later. During this time, the theater screened second-run, independent and art-house releases, which it continued until 1997.

The theater was bought by Oasis Church in 1997 and renamed Oasis Theater in 2007. The theater was sold again in 2012 and demolished in 2015, replaced by a block-long mixed-use development.

== Architecture and design ==
Four Star Theatre was a two-story, trapezoidal plan building designed to fit into the surrounding community. The theater featured an Art Deco design with elements that included an emphasis on verticality, smooth stucco surfaces, fixed metal sash and casement windows and a facade that included zigzags, chevrons, stripes, abstract figurative and floral motifs and bas reliefs that depicted "Artistry" and "Unity". The building also featured a central tower that rose in a series of staggered steps, while the roof had a slight barrel vault with a high and geomatric parapet above the front elevation and a low parapet above the others.

The building's front elevation consisted of three bays, with the entrance in the center bay. The entrance featured aluminum and glass doors with glass transoms, while the flanking bays featured glass block. The elevations away from the front were unadorned and made of concrete.

The building's interior was divided into lobby and auditorium spaces. The lobby featured contemporary finishings, including linoleum flooring, wainscoting along the southern wall and wood sheathing on a structural pier near the entrance. A zigzag plaster band also ran across the ceiling and a half-turn staircase stylized with botanical balusters led to the second story.

The auditorium was accessed through two pairs of metal doors and featured a raked floor made of polished concrete that led to a stage that housed three large screens. The auditorium walls were finished in plaster and punctuated by piers, and also featured several sections of decorative fluting painted to contrast with the rest of the wall. The north auditorium wall also featured a string of small, fixed window openings.

=== Alterations ===
Four Star Theatre underwent extensive alterations over the years. These included:

- Original marquee, highlighted in neon with light bulbs, removed at an unknown date
- Terrazzo flooring at the entrance and the original blade sign on the high parapet replaced between 1946 and 1948
- Parapet alterations and the original box office removed in 1962
- Interior remodel in 1987
- Exterior repainted green and white in 1997
- Additional exterior alterations post-1997
- Bas reliefs cemented over in 1999
- Additional interior work from 1998 to 2000

== Historic designation ==
Four Star Theatre was first surveyed for historical significance in 1982 and, despite numerous alterations, the building was deemed eligible for inclusion in the National Register of Historic Places. However, when the nearby Miracle Mile Historic District was surveyed in the 1980s, the theater was not included in the boundaries of the district and was also determined ineligible for inclusion in the National Register. An evaluation in 2013 found the theater ineligible for inclusion at the national, state and local levels because of its comprised integrity of design resulting from the theater's numerous alterations.
