= Lido Theater (Newport Beach) =

Historic movie theater in Newport Beach, California

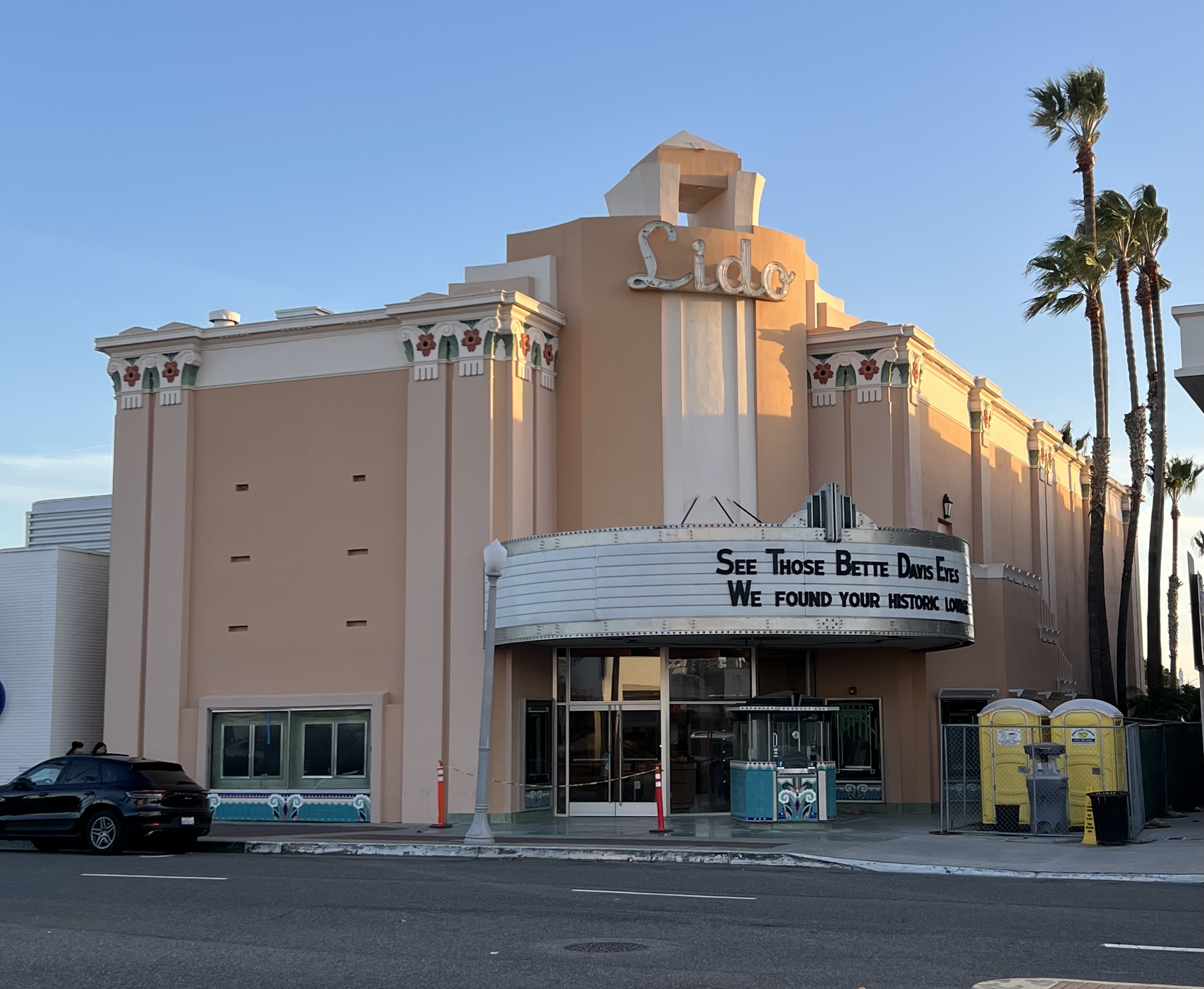
- The Lido Theater in 2024
- Interactive map of Lido Theater
- Address: 3459 Via Lido; Newport Beach, California; U.S.
- Coordinates: 33°37′06″N 117°55′46″W
- Owner: Fritz Duda Company
- Operator: River Jetty Restaurant Group
- Screen: 1

Construction
- Opened: October 27, 1939; 86 years ago
- Architect: Clifford A. Balch

The Lido Theater (also spelled Lido Theatre) is a historic single-screen movie theater in Newport Beach, California. The Lido Theater opened in October 1939 and was designed by Clifford A. Balch in the Art Deco architectural style. Edwards Theatres, Regency Theatres, and Laemmle Theatres previously operated the facility.

== History ==
In March 1939, a new movie theater to be built near the entrance of Lido Isle was proposed with plans drafted by the Griffith Company. The projected cost of the project was US$105,000, including $15,000 to purchase the lot, $45,000 for the building, $15,000 for theater equipment, and $30,000 to create a parking lot and landscape the surrounding area. On April 26, the theater's construction was permitted; an increase in planned capacity from 750 to 800 was also announced.

The Lido Theater opened to the public on October 27, 1939. A popular urban legend about the theater claims it screened Jezebel as its first feature at the suggestion of Bette Davis, the film's star and a resident of nearby Corona del Mar; however, a newspaper report at the time stated that it opened with a vaudeville show titled The Colonel from Kentucky.

In 1989, the 50th anniversary of the Lido Theater was marked by a $250,000 renovation. The theater's ocean murals were restored with luminous paint and the exterior was repainted.

On September 9, 2001, Edwards Theatres ceased its operation of the Lido Theater amidst the company's bankruptcy proceedings. The owner, the Fritz Duda Company, closed the building while searching for a new operator. Regency Theatres, a movie theater chain in Southern California, signed a lease to operate the theater later that year.

In June 2014, Regency Theatres' lease on the Lido Theater expired. A company called Lido Live signed a lease to operate the theater, planning to use it for both movies and live entertainment.

During the COVID-19 pandemic in October 2020, the sidewalk in front of the theater and the area under its marquee were used for outdoor dining for local restaurant Fable & Spirit. The marquee sign bore the name of the restaurant and its head chef.

In September 2024, it was announced that the Lido Theater would reopen with Fritz Duda hiring director and producer McG as the new operator, through his company River Jetty Restaurant Group, after more than four years of renovations.

== Architecture ==
Architect Clifford A. Balch designed the theater in the Art Deco style. The building's original facade, facing north on Via Lido, included a corner entrance with 45 foot (14 m)-tall tower and a circular marquee made of copper.

The theater's original exterior color scheme has been disputed. During the 1989 renovation, a consultant hired to test for the original color of the building determined it was light pink. In 2014, the theater's operator stated that she believed the building was originally yellow and said that some records claimed it was purple. That year, the Fritz Duda Company decided to paint the exterior taupe, causing controversy among locals and a preservation advocacy group.
