= Clifford Balch =

American architect (1880–1963)

Clifford A. Balch
- Born: Clifford Allison Balch; June 23, 1880; Preston Lake, Minnesota, U.S.
- Died: December 14, 1963 (aged 83); Los Angeles, California, U.S.
- Education: Throop College
- Occupation: Architect
- Known for: Movie theater design
- Notable work: Golden Gate Theater; Fox California; Fox Pomona

Clifford Allison Balch (June 23, 1880 – December 14, 1963) was an American architect who specialized in movie theater design. Balch designed numerous theaters in Southern California, including the National Register of Historic Places-listed Golden Gate, Fox California, and Fox Pomona.

== Early life ==
Clifford Allison Balch was born on June 23, 1880, in Preston Lake, Minnesota. His father, William C. Balch, was a carpenter and his mother, Anna S. Balch (née Houck), was a homemaker. He was one of seven children born to the couple, three of whom died in infancy. The Balch family moved to Pasadena, California in the early 1890s.

Balch graduated high school in Oakland, California in 1897. He graduated from Throop College in Pasadena in 1901.

== Career ==
Balch began his career working as a draftsman for Reginald D. Johnson, a position he held for three years. He then worked for William C. Pennell for seven years.

Balch worked as a resident architect while living with and supporting his mother and younger brothers c. 1909. As a resident architect, he worked for William B. Edwards (1911—1913), Greene and Greene (1913—1914), Reginald D. Johnson (1914—1916), and William C. Pennell (1920—1928). He served as first lieutenant in the 40th Division of the 160th Infantry Regiment of the United States Army during World War I.

Balch worked in his own practice from 1928 to 1946 and at various times, he partnered with Floyd Edgar Stanbery, Walker & Eisen, Henry Franklin Withey, and his brother William Glenn Balch.

Balch joined the American Institute of Architects in 1946.

== Personal life and death ==
Balch married Pearl Payne in the 1910s. They had three children together: Margaret, William, and Nina.

Balch died in Los Angeles on December 14, 1963 at the age of 83.

== List of works ==
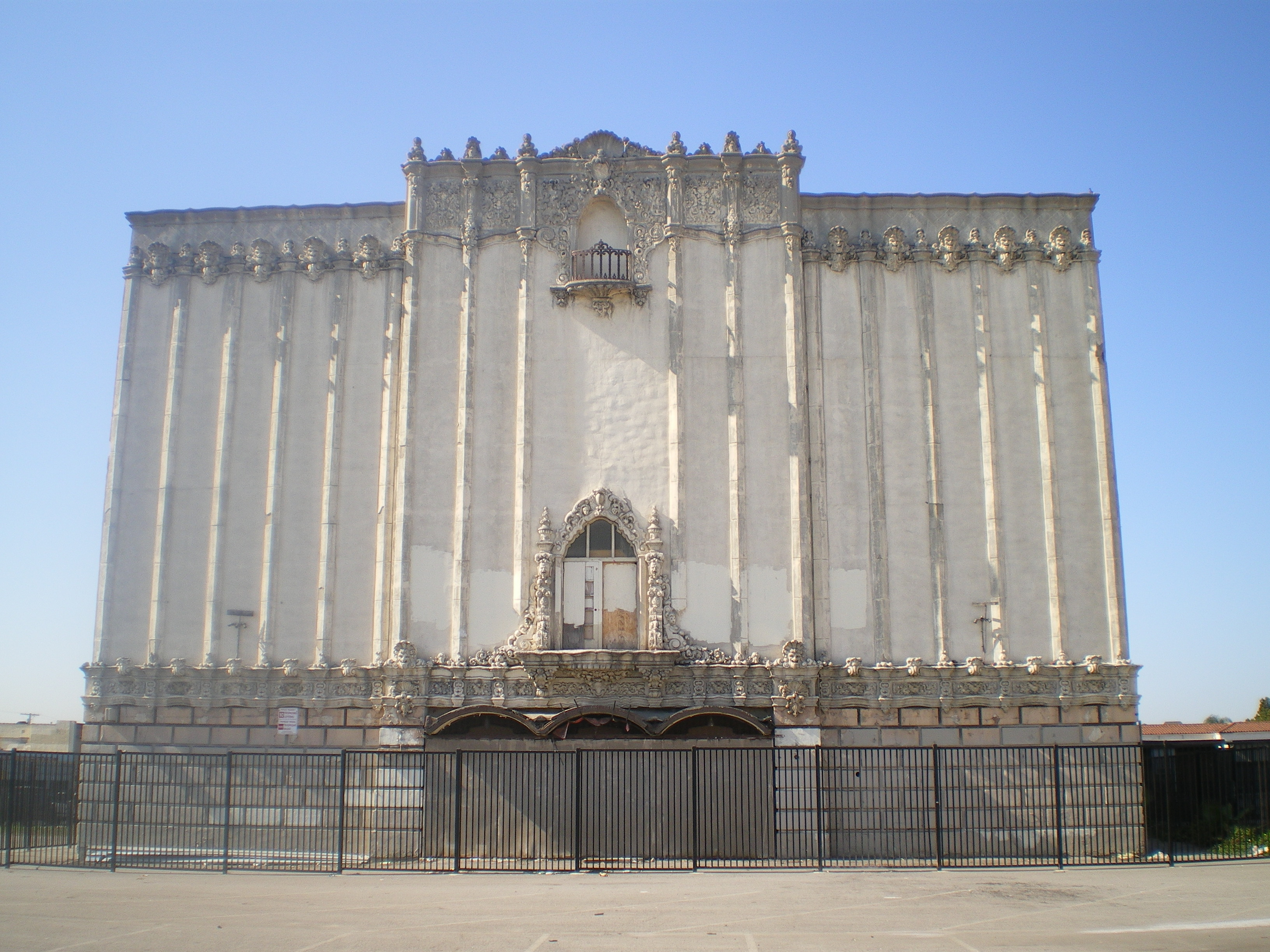
Golden Gate Theater

Notable buildings designed by Balch include:

=== Theaters ===
- New T and D, Berkeley, 1914
- California, San Diego, 1919
- Imperial, Long Beach, 1925
- Golden Gate, East Los Angeles, 1927, NRHP-listed

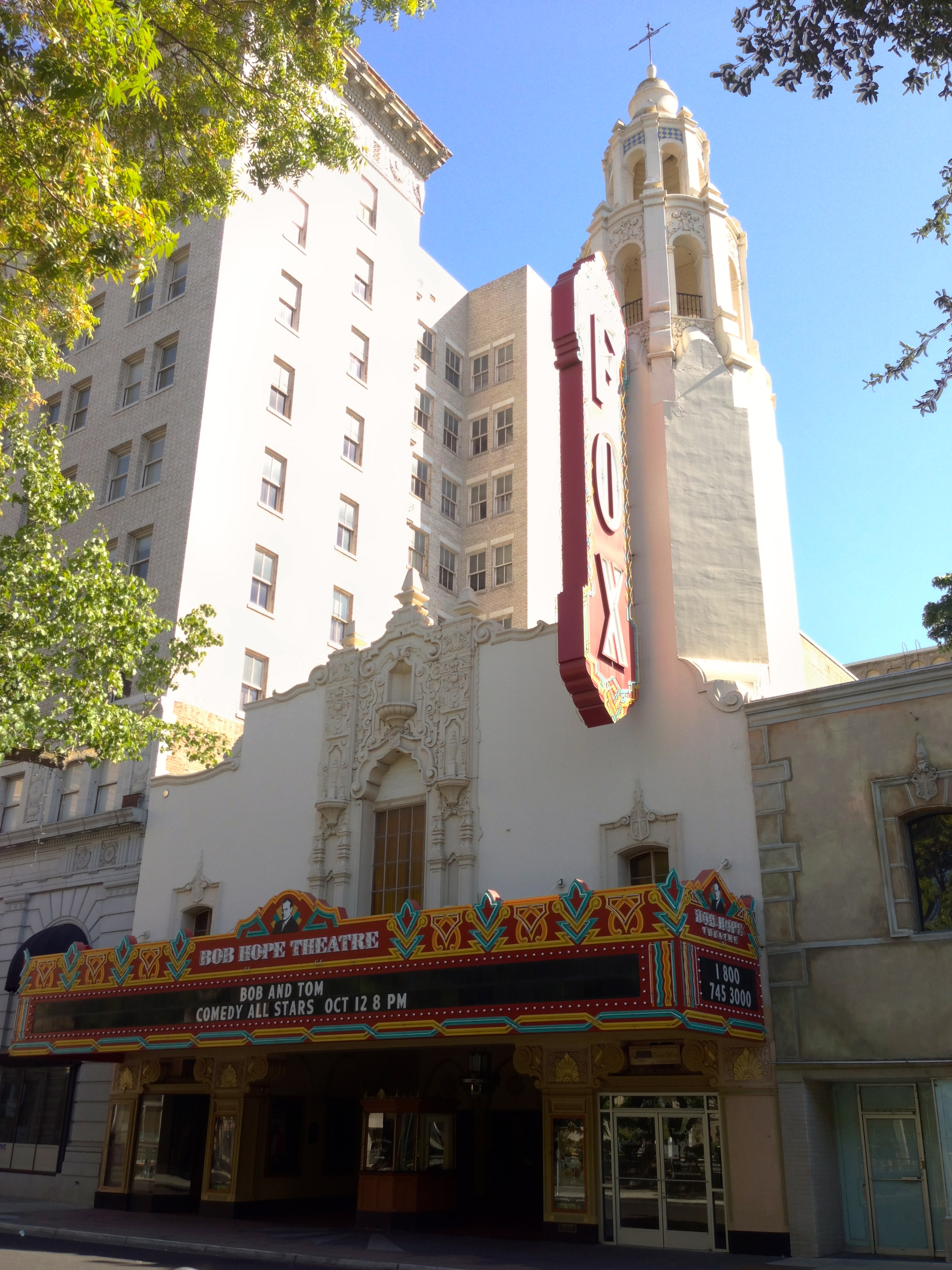
Fox California

- Fox West Coast Theaters
  - Redlands, 1928
  - Hanford, 1929
  - Riverside, 1929
  - California, Stockton, 1930, NRHP-listed
  - Pasadena, 1930 remodel
  - Visalia, 1930
  - Pomona, 1931, NRHP-listed

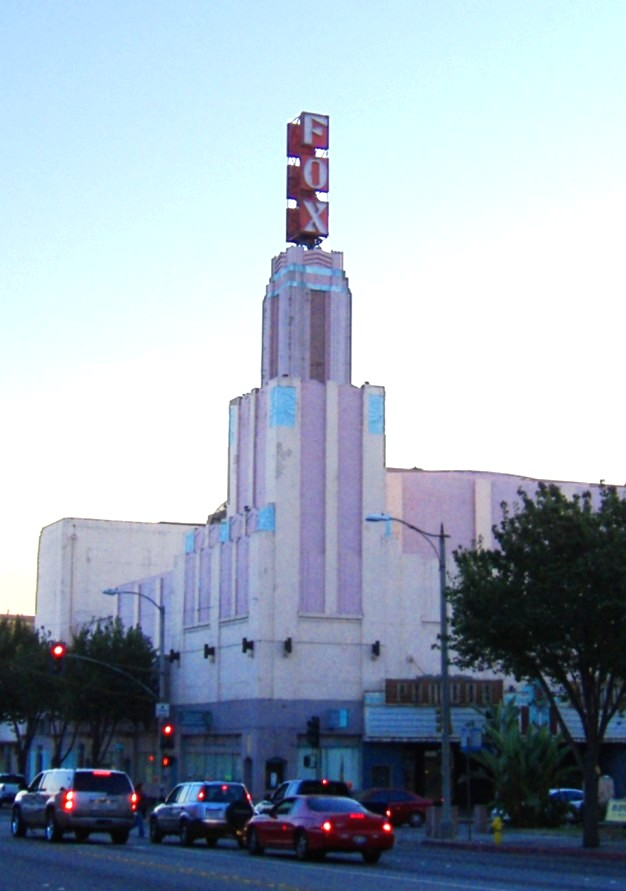
Fox Pomona

- Sunbeam, Los Angeles, 1933 remodel
- Adams, San Diego, 1935
- El Rey, Los Angeles, 1936, LAHCM No. 520
- Palomar, Oceanside, 1936
- Esquire, Los Angeles, 1937
- Lido, Los Angeles, 1937
- Brawley, Brawley, 1937
- Miramar, San Clemente, 1938
- Studio City, Los Angeles, 1938
- Lido, Newport Beach, 1939
- Newport, Newport Beach, 1939
- San Gabriel, San Gabriel, 1941
- State, Pomona, 1941
- River, Bakersfield
- Rivoli, Los Angeles

==== With Walker & Eisen ====
- United Artists Theaters
  - East Los Angeles, 1931
  - Inglewood, 1931
  - Long Beach, 1931
  - Pasadena, 1931
  - Berkeley, 1932
  - El Centro, 1932
  - Los Angeles, 1932
  - Ventura, 1932

=== Other buildings ===
- Sardi's Restaurant, Los Angeles, 1933
- Visalia Public Library, Visalia, 1936

== See also ==
- List of American architects
- List of people from Los Angeles
