= Studio City Theater =

Former theater in Studio City, Los Angeles, CA

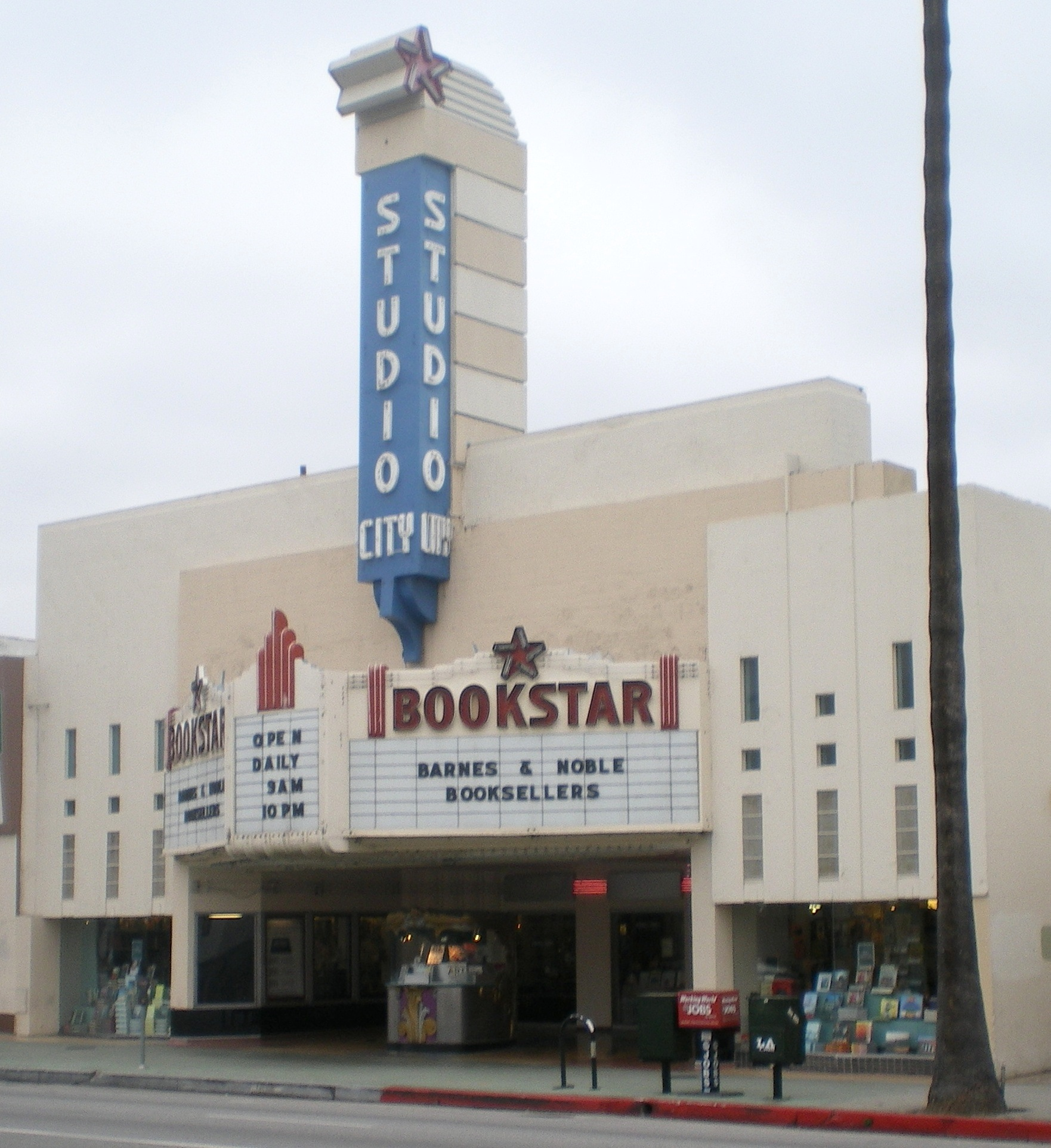
- The building in 2007
- Interactive map of Studio City Theater
- Address: 12136 Ventura Boulevard; Los Angeles
- Coordinates: 34.1435°N 118.3964°W
- Capacity: 880
- Type: Former movie theater

Construction
- Opened: 1938
- Closed: 1991
- Architect: Clifford Balch

Studio City Theater, also known as Studio Theater and Fox Studio City, was a movie theater located at 12136 Ventura Boulevard in Los Angeles, California. Closed in 1991, it was Studio City's last public movie theater.

== History ==
Studio City Theater was designed by Clifford Balch, an architect who designed dozens of theaters throughout southern California. It opened in 1938 with a capacity of 880. Originally privately operated, it was taken over by Fox West Coast Theatres soon after opening. Its opening night screening was Mayerling and The Marines Are Here.

The theater was financially successful through the 1970s but later struggled to compete with multiplexes. Mann Theater owned the theater during this time and by 1990, this theater was one of only two single-screen movie theaters in the entire San Fernando Valley.

Studio City Theater closed in 1991, after which it was converted to a Barnes and Noble bookstore. As of 2011, Studio City contained no public movie theaters; all proposed were blocked by the Studio City Resident Association.

== Architecture and design ==
Studio City Theater featured an Art Deco design, and both the design and the box office remain despite the building being converted to retail. The theater's original terrazzo flooring also remains.
