= Visalia Branch Library =

Public library in Visalia, California, U.S.

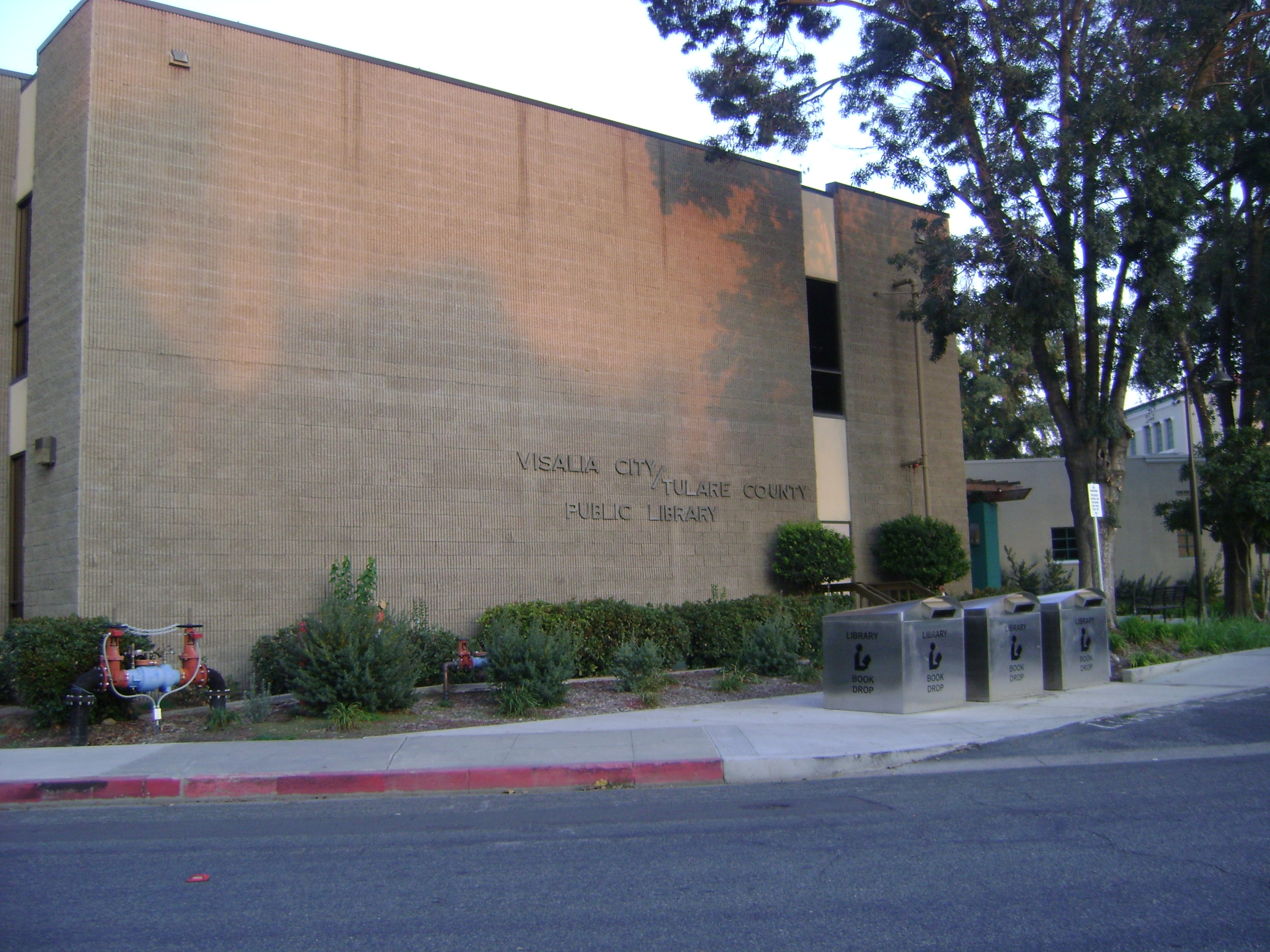
- 36.3325°N 119.2943°W
- Location: Visalia, California, United States
- Type: Public
- Established: 1936
- Branches: 15

Access and use
- Population served: 125,921 (city); 447,814 (metro)

Other information
- Website: www.tularecountylibrary.org/locations-visalia

The Visalia Branch Library system serves the residents of Visalia, California, United States. It is a part of the Tulare County Library system.

== History ==
The Visalia Free Library, built with Carnegie Corporation funds, opened on May 31, 1904. From 1910 to 1919 the County of Tulare maintained the Tulare County Free Library system under the laws of the State of California at the same location.

In 1926 the city of Visalia offered to furnish a site and pay one-half the construction cost as well as to pay its share of maintenance for a new library building for the county. The offer was declined. A new Visalia Public Library, designed by Los Angeles architect Clifford A. Balch, was built in 1936, and was partially funded by a grant from the New Deal-era Public Works Administration (PWA). On August 3, 1961, additional space was added to the Visalia Library when a children's reading room and a stack room officially were opened for use.

In 1976 a new Joint Tulare County/Visalia City Library building was constructed with grant funds, for one and one-half million dollars. The old Visalia City Library was vacated and used for storage after the new library was constructed. The Annie Mitchell History Room was added in 1983.

The main library building, built in 1976, was remodeled merging with the 1936 building into one larger facility in 2008. The PWA-funded Visalia Public Library building was restored and now houses the children's wing and the Administration offices of the Tulare County Library.
