= Cameo Theatre (Los Angeles) =

Former movie theater in Los Angeles, California

- U.S. Historic district – Contributing property
- Los Angeles Historic-Cultural Monument
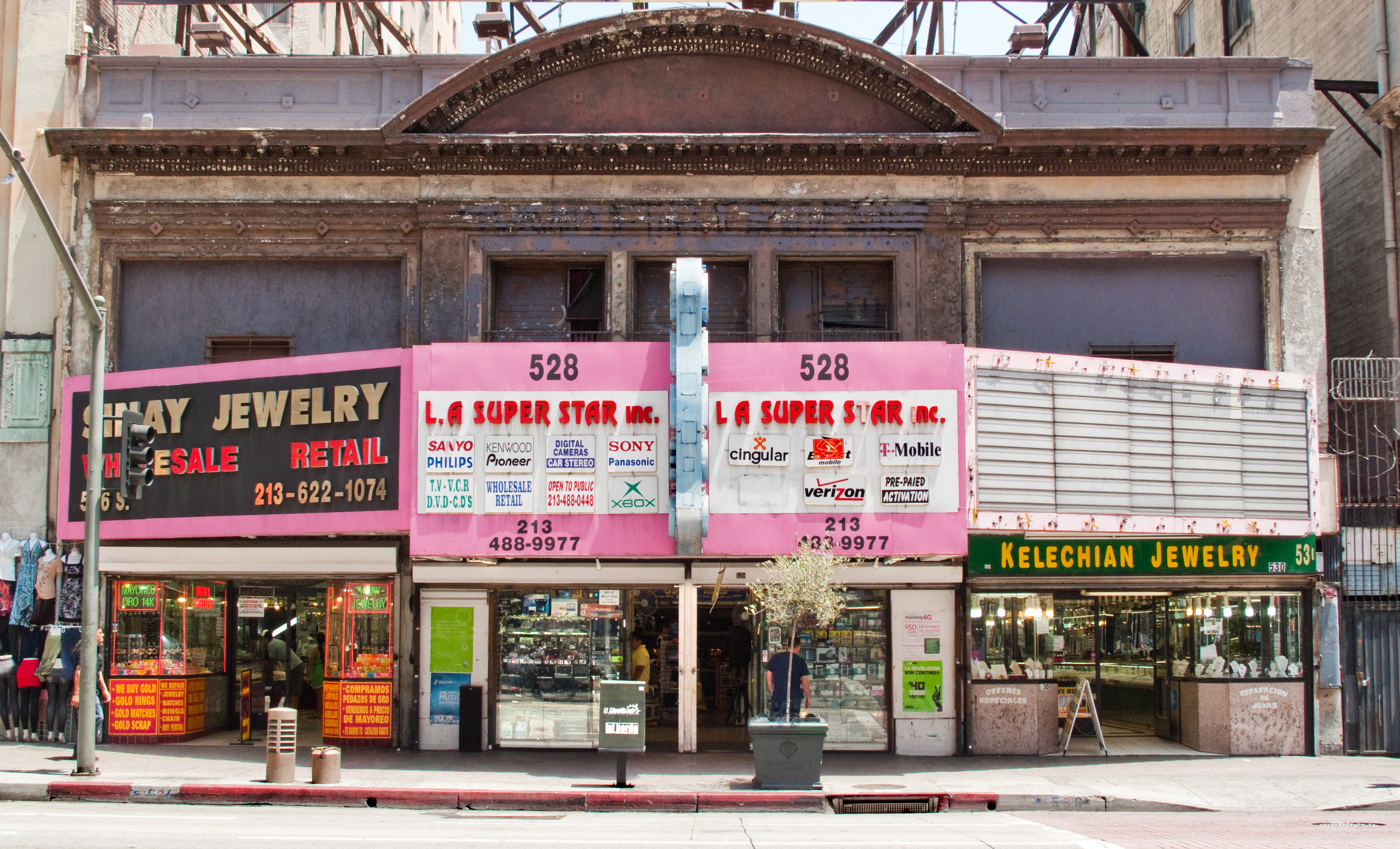
- The former theater's facade in 2012

- Location within the Los Angeles metropolitan area
- Location: 528 S. Broadway, Los Angeles, California
- Coordinates: 34.0474°N 118.251°W
- Built: 1910
- Architect: Alfred Rosenheim
- Architectural style: Beaux Arts interpretation of Italian Renaissance
- Part of: Broadway Theater and Commercial District (ID79000484)
- LAHCM No.: 524

Significant dates
- Designated CP: May 9, 1979
- Designated LAHCM: March 20, 1991

The Cameo Theatre is a historic former movie theater on Broadway in Los Angeles, California. Film mogul W. H. Clune opened it in 1910 as Clune's Broadway Theatre, one of the first purpose-built movie theaters in the United States. It remained the oldest continually operating movie theater in Los Angeles until its closure in 1991.

== History ==
Hollywood mogul W. H. Clune opened Clune's Broadway Theatre on October 10, 1910. Opening night rates were advertised at 10 cents for standard seats and 20 cents for loge seats. The theater became one of the first in the United States built specifically to show movies. In 1921, a US$50,000 Wurlitzer organ was installed in the theater.

In 1924, Los Angeles theater proprietor H. L. Gumbinger closed the facility for renovation. The overhaul included the addition of a 16-piece house orchestra. Gumbinger reopened the building as the Cameo Theatre on August 1, 1924, with a premiere of the Universal Pictures silent drama The Signal Tower attended by its director and co-stars.

Various companies subsequently operated the Cameo throughout its history: Fox West Coast Theatres, Pacific Theatres, and Metropolitan Theatres. The decline of the Cameo mirrored the downturn of the Broadway Theater District in Los Angeles. At 4:00 a.m. on December 2, 1991, the Cameo was permanently closed following its final quadruple-bill run of action films. At the time, it was the oldest operating movie theater in Los Angeles. The building retained most of its original facade and was converted into retail space.

== Architecture and design ==
Alfred Rosenheim designed Cameo Theater, which features a Beaux Arts interpretation of Italian Renaissance architecture. It was built of brick and concrete, with a facade that features a large, round pediment above the building entrance. Inside, the auditorium featured a silk canopy under its ceiling.

== See also ==
- List of Los Angeles Historic-Cultural Monuments in Downtown Los Angeles
- List of contributing properties in the Broadway Theater and Commercial District
