= Alameda Theater (East Los Angeles) =

Former movie theater in East Los Angeles, California

- Interactive map of Alameda Theater
- Address: 5136 Whittier Boulevard; East Los Angeles, California
- Coordinates: 34°01′14″N 118°09′32″W
- Capacity: 916
- Screen: 1

Construction
- Opened: 1931
- Closed: 1986
- Architects: Clifford A. Balch; Walker & Eisen

Alameda Theater, also known as United Artists Theater, East Los Angeles, is a historic former movie theater located at 5136 Whittier Boulevard in East Los Angeles, California.

== History ==
Clifford A. Balch and Walker & Eisen worked together to design Alameda Theater, one of thirteen Art Deco theaters designed for United Artists by the trio. The theater, which sat 916, was built for United Artists but was operated by Fox West Coast Theaters soon after completion. Construction was budgeted at $57,500 ($1.22 million in 2025).

Alameda Theater screened Spanish language films from 1972 until the theater closed in 1986. An auto stereo store occupied the building c. 2010.

== Architecture ==
Alameda Theater features a vertical Art Deco facade that Los Angeles County considers to be characteristic of the Art Deco style.

== In popular culture ==
Alameda Theater was featured in Boulevard Nights.
