= Studio City, Los Angeles =

Neighborhood in Los Angeles, California

Studio City
- Neighborhood of Los Angeles
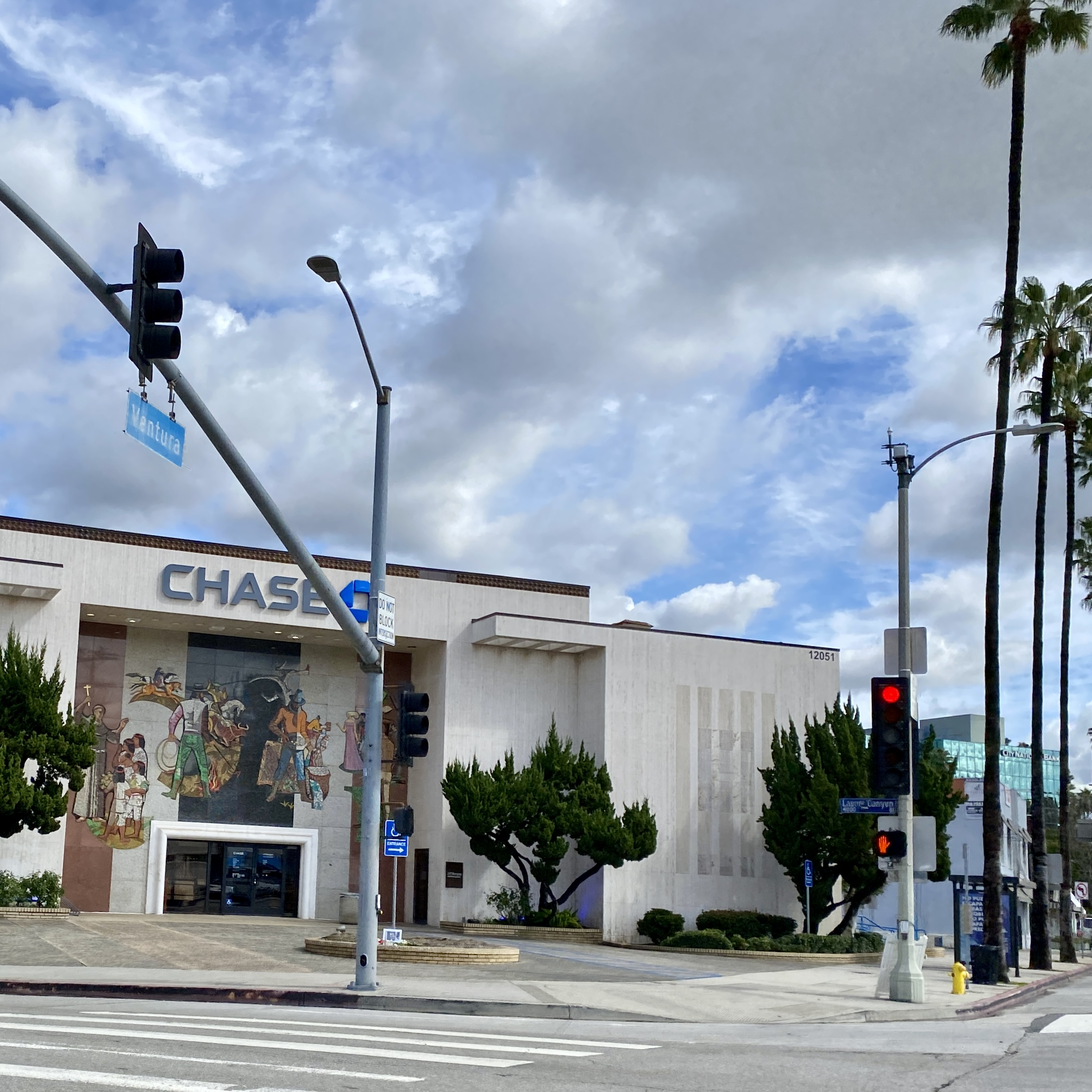
- Millard Sheets Studio mosaic mural, Ventura and Laurel Canyon boulevards, 2024

- Location within Los Angeles/San Fernando Valley Studio City (the Los Angeles metropolitan area)
- Coordinates: 34°08′37″N 118°23′43″W
- Country: United States
- State: California
- County: Los Angeles
- City: Los Angeles
- Named for: The studio lot now known as Radford Studio Center

Studio City is a neighborhood in Los Angeles, California, United States, in the southeast San Fernando Valley, just west of the Cahuenga Pass. It is named after the studio lot that was established in the area by film producer Mack Sennett in 1927, now known as Radford Studio Center.

== History ==
Originally known as Laurelwood, the area that Studio City occupies was formerly part of Rancho Ex-Mission San Fernando. Rancho Ex-Mission San Fernando was a 116,858-acre (472.91 km^{2}) Mexican land grant in present-day Los Angeles County, California, granted in 1846 by Governor Pío Pico to Eulogio F. de Celis. This land changed hands several times during the late 19th century, and eventually passed into the ownership of James Boon Lankershim (1850–1931) and eight other developers, who organized the Lankershim Ranch Land and Water Company. In 1899, the area lost most water rights to Los Angeles, so subdivision and sale of land for farming became untenable.

Construction of the Los Angeles Aqueduct began in 1908, and water reached the San Fernando Valley in November 1913. Real estate boomed, and a syndicate led by Harry Chandler, business manager of the Los Angeles Times, with Hobart Johnstone Whitley, Isaac Van Nuys, and James Boon Lankershim acquired the remaining 47,500 acres (192 km^{2}) of the southern half of the former Mission lands—everything west of the Lankershim town limits and south of present-day Roscoe Boulevard excepting the Rancho Encino. Whitley platted the area of present-day Studio City from portions of the existing town of Lankershim, as well as the eastern part of the new acquisition.

In 1927, Mack Sennett began building a new studio on 20 acres (81,000 m^{2}) donated by the land developer. The area around the studio was named Studio City.

In 1955, Studio City's Station 78 became the first racially integrated station in the Los Angeles City Fire Department.

A house fire that soon spread to surrounding homes broke out in Studio City on January 8, 2025 as part of the January 2025 Southern California wildfires.

== Geography ==
The Los Angeles River and Tujunga Wash flow through Studio City. The two concrete-lined channels merge just west of Colfax Avenue and north of Ventura Boulevard adjacent to Radford Studio Center.

Climate data for Studio City, Los Angeles
| Month | Jan | Feb | Mar | Apr | May | Jun | Jul | Aug | Sep | Oct | Nov | Dec | Year |
|---|---|---|---|---|---|---|---|---|---|---|---|---|---|
| Mean daily maximum °F (°C) | 68 (20) | 69 (21) | 70 (21) | 74 (23) | 76 (24) | 81 (27) | 86 (30) | 88 (31) | 85 (29) | 81 (27) | 73 (23) | 68 (20) | 77 (25) |
| Mean daily minimum °F (°C) | 45 (7) | 46 (8) | 48 (9) | 50 (10) | 54 (12) | 58 (14) | 61 (16) | 62 (17) | 60 (16) | 55 (13) | 48 (9) | 44 (7) | 53 (12) |
| Average precipitation inches (mm) | 3.99 (101) | 4.54 (115) | 3.95 (100) | 0.99 (25) | 0.38 (9.7) | 0.08 (2.0) | 0.02 (0.51) | 0.17 (4.3) | 0.32 (8.1) | 0.59 (15) | 1.37 (35) | 2.22 (56) | 18.62 (473) |

== Demographics ==
The 2000 U.S. census counted 34,034 residents in the 6.31-square-mile (16.3 km^{2}) Studio City neighborhood—5,395 people per square mile, among the lowest population densities for the city but about average for the county. In 2008, the city estimated that the resident population had increased to 37,201.

In 2000, the median age for residents, 38, was considered old for city and county neighborhoods; the percent of residents age 19 and older was among the county's highest.

The ethnic breakdown was White, 78%; Latino, 8.7%; Asian, 5.4%; Black, 3.7%; and others, 4.1%. Iran (7%) and the United Kingdom (6.7%) were the most common places of birth for the 21.1% of the residents who were born abroad—a low percentage for Los Angeles.

The median yearly household income in 2008 dollars was $75,657, considered high for the city. The percent of households earning $125,000 and up was high for Los Angeles County. The average household size of 1.9 people was low when compared to the rest of the city and the county. Renters occupied 55.9% of the housing stock and house- or apartment-owners held 44.1%.

In 2000, there were 837 families headed by single parents, the rate of 11.2% being low for the city of Los Angeles. There were 2,591 veterans, 8.8% of the population, a high figure for the city.

== Arts and culture ==
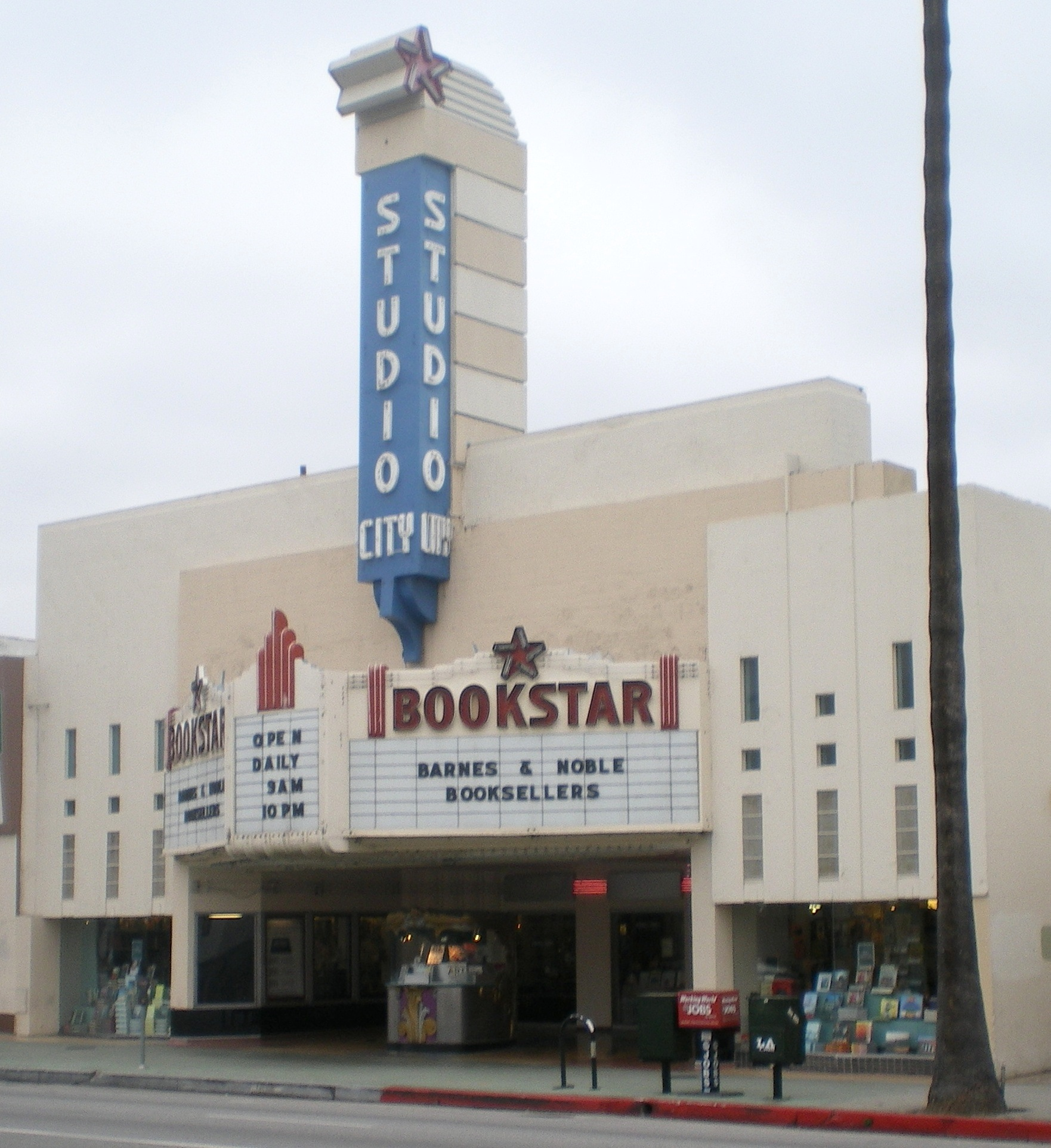
Studio City Theater, now a Barnes & Noble bookstore

=== Notable places ===
- Radford Studio Center
- North Valleyheart Riverwalk
- Exterior of Brady Bunch house
- Campo de Cahuenga
- Several buildings by Rudolph Michael Schindler
- Studio City Theatre
- Studio City Walk of Fame

=== Library ===
- The Studio City branch of the Los Angeles Public Library is at the corner of Moorpark Street and Whitsett Avenue

== Parks and recreation ==
The Studio City Recreation Center (commonly known as Beeman Park) is in a residential neighborhood on Rye Street at Beeman Avenue. It has an auditorium, barbecue pits, a lighted baseball diamond, an outdoor running and walking track, lighted outdoor basketball courts, a children's play area, picnic tables, unlighted tennis courts, and many programs and classes including the second-largest youth baseball program in the public parks.

Moorpark Park, an unstaffed pocket park at the corner of Moorpark Street and Laurel Canyon Boulevard, has a children's play area and picnic tables.

Woodbridge Park, on Elmer Avenue at Moorpark Street, on the eastern border of Studio City has a children and toddler's play area.

Wilacre Park, a 128-acre natural mountain park with the lower trailhead for the Betty B Dearing hiking trail, is on Fryman Road at Laurel Canyon Boulevard. It has a large parking lot, restrooms and a picnic area. It is part of the Santa Monica Mountains Conservancy and is managed by the Mountains Recreation & Conservation Authority.

Fryman Canyon Park is a 122-acre nature park accessed via the Nancy Hoover Pohl Overlook on Mulholland Drive with the upper trailhead of the Betty B Dearing hiking trail. The park is part of the Santa Monica Mountains Conservancy and is managed by the Mountains Recreation & Conservation Authority.

Coldwater Canyon Park is a nature park adjacent to Wilacre Park and Fryman Canyon Park. It contains an amphitheater and the headquarters for the conservation group TreePeople. It can be accessed via a parking lot near the corner of Mulholland Drive and Coldwater Canyon Avenue and via the Betty B Dearing Trail. The park is managed by the City of Los Angeles Department of Recreation and Parks (LA Parks). This park is not to be confused with an unrelated park with the name Coldwater Canyon Park, three miles to the south on North Beverly Drive in the city of Beverly Hills.

In addition, Studio City has the Studio City Mini-Park, an unstaffed pocket park.

North Valleyheart Riverwalk is a linear park that abuts the Los Angeles River.

== Government ==
The northeast part of Studio City is in City Council District 2, represented by Adrin Nazarian, and the southwest section is in District 4, represented by Nithya Raman. The community is represented within the city of Los Angeles by the Studio City Neighborhood Council.

The area is represented by Los Angeles County District 3 Supervisor Lindsey Horvath and District 5 Supervisor Kathryn Barger, State Senator Henry Stern, California Assemblyman Nick Schultz, and U.S. Representative Brad Sherman.

== Education ==
Almost half of Studio City residents aged 25 and older (49.4%) had earned a four-year degree by 2000, a high percentage for both the city and the county. The percentage of those residents with a master's degree was also high for the county.

=== Schools ===
Walter Reed Middle School

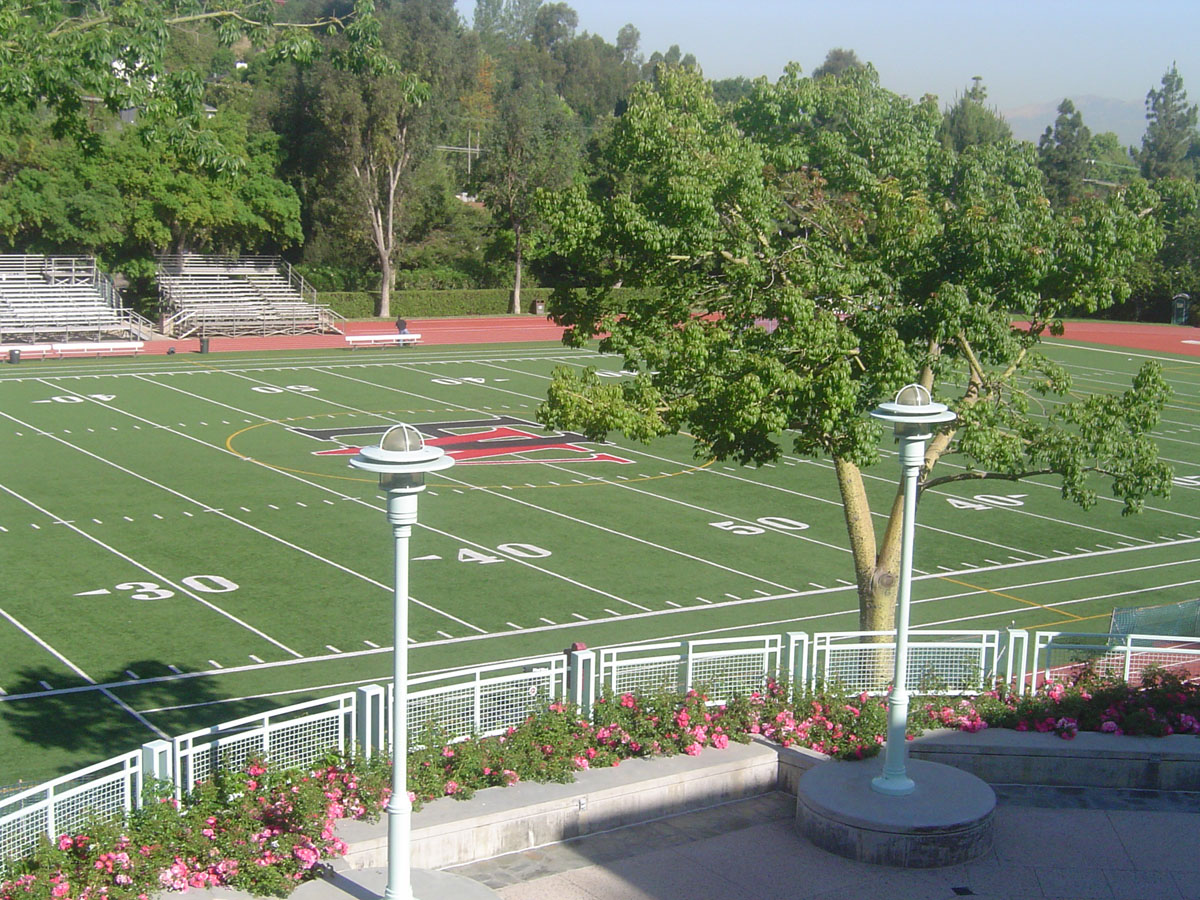
Athletic field at Upper Campus, Harvard-Westlake School

Schools within the Studio City boundaries are:

- Bridges Academy, private, 4–12, 3921 Laurel Canyon Boulevard
- Campbell Hall School, private, K–12, 4533 Laurel Canyon Boulevard
- Carpenter Community Charter School, LAUSD, K–5, 3909 Carpenter Avenue
- Harvard-Westlake School, private, 10–12, 3700 Coldwater Canyon Avenue
- Walter Reed Middle School, LAUSD, 6–8, 4525 Irvine Avenue
- Oakwood School, private, K–6, 11230 Moorpark Street
- Rio Vista Elementary School, LAUSD, K–5, 4243 Satsuma Avenue
- St. Charles Borromeo School, private, K–8, 10850 Moorpark Street

== Notable people ==
=== Film and television ===
- Leon Ames, film and television actor
- Ernie Anderson, television and radio announcer/voiceover artist
- Paul Thomas Anderson, film director
- Dana Andrews, film actor and past president of the Screen Actors' Guild
- R. G. Armstrong, actor and playwright
- Ed Asner, film, television, stage, and voice actor, past president of the SAG
- Gene Autry, actor, singer-songwriter, businessman and owner of the California Angels baseball team
- Elizabeth Banks, actress and director
- Joe Barbera, animator, director and co-founder of Hanna-Barbera studios
- Bonnie Bartlett, television and film actress
- Ed Begley Jr., actor and environmentalist
- Joseph Benti, television news anchor
- Mayim Bialik, film and television actress
- Robert Blake, actor
- Julie Bowen, actress
- Clancy Brown, actor
- Smiley Burnette, comedic actor, singer-songwriter and inventor
- George Clooney, actor, film director, producer, and screenwriter
- Gary Cole, actor
- Marisa Coughlan, actress
- Barry Crane, television producer and director
- Jon Cryer, actor
- William Daniels, actor and former president of the Screen Actors Guild
- Whitney Cummings, actress and comedian
- Brad Davis, actor
- Jimmy Dore, comedian and political commentator
- Yvonne De Carlo, actress of film, television, and theater
- Zooey Deschanel, actress
- Leonardo DiCaprio, actor and producer
- Charles S. Dutton, stage, film, and television actor and director
- Zac Efron, actor
- Erik Estrada, actor
- Clark Gable, actor
- Betty Garrett, actress, singer and dancer
- Jennie Garth, actress
- Alice Ghostley, actress
- Vince Gironda, movie star trainer and bodybuilder
- Meagan Good, actress, film producer
- Cuba Gooding Jr., actor
- Ryan Gosling, actor
- Gary Graver, film director and cinematographer
- Tom Green, actor, comedian
- Earl Holliman, Golden Globe winning film and television actor.
- Lucy Hale, actress and singer
- Neil Patrick Harris, actor, singer, writer and magician
- Laurel Holloman, actress
- Vanessa Hudgens, actress and singer
- Josh Hutcherson, actor
- Allison Janney, actress
- Mila Kunis, actress
- Tom Kenny, voice actor, voice director, comedian
- Lucy Lawless, actress
- Lucy Liu, actress
- Seth MacFarlane, actor, singer, comedian and producer
- Jennette McCurdy, actress
- Roddy McDowall, actor and photographer
- Kevin McKidd, film and television actor
- Alyssa Milano, actress
- Dennis Miller, TV host and comedian
- Chloë Grace Moretz, actress
- Bill Nye, science educator, comedian, television host, actor, and mechanical engineer
- Jack Osbourne, reality show star
- Patton Oswalt, actor and comedian
- Russell Peters, comedian
- Jason Priestley, television actor
- Lance Reddick, actor
- Michael Richards, actor, comedian, writer and television producer
- Alex Rocco, actor
- Aaron Seltzer, director and screenwriter
- William Shatner, actor, musician, recording artist, and author
- Melville Shavelson, film director, producer, screenwriter, and author
- Mason Shefa, director of experimental films
- Anna Nicole Smith, model, actress and television personality
- Sage Stallone, actor and producer
- Jonathan Stark, actor, writer, producer
- Linda Stirling, actress, showgirl, model and college professor
- Lyle Talbot, film, TV and stage actor; a founder of the Screen Actors Guild (SAG); honorary mayor of Studio City in the 1960s
- Stephen Talbot, child actor; PBS Frontline documentary producer
- Alex Trebek, game show host
- Renee Valente, producer, former president of the Producers Guild of America
- Sofía Vergara, actress
- Nancy Walker, actress, comedian and director
- Anton Yelchin, actor

=== Music ===
- Alesso, EDM artist
- Bruno Mars, singer-songwriter, producer
- Kenny Aronoff, session drummer
- Pete Candoli, swing and West Coast jazz trumpeter
- Cirkut, songwriter and producer
- Morty Corb, jazz double-bassist
- Miley Cyrus, singer-songwriter and actress
- Kara DioGuardi, songwriter and former American Idol judge, former resident of Studio City
- Cleto Escobedo III, saxophonist for the Jimmy Kimmel Live! show
- Clare Fischer, composer, arranger, keyboardist
- Peter Frampton, guitarist
- Kenny G, musician
- Peggy Gilbert, jazz saxophonist and bandleader
- Selena Gomez, singer, songwriter, and actress
- HAIM, band consisting of three sisters: Este, Danielle and Alana Haim
- Demi Lovato, singer, songwriter, and actor
- Steve Lukather, electric guitarist
- Randy Meisner, bassist, founding member of the Eagles
- Mac Miller, rapper and producer
- Uan Rasey, trumpet player
- Gavin Rossdale, musician and singer
- Hans J. Salter, film composer
- Judee Sill, composer, singer-songwriter
- Eddie Van Halen, guitarist, keyboardist, songwriter and producer
- Al Viola, jazz guitarist
- Joe Walsh, guitarist, singer-songwriter and amateur radio enthusiast
- Pete Wentz, lyricist and bassist
- Yoshiki, Japanese rock musician and producer
- Dweezil Zappa, rock guitarist
- Frank Zappa, composer, singer-songwriter, electric guitarist, record producer and film director

=== Literature ===
- Elizabeth Forsythe Hailey, journalist and playwright
- Jerry Pournelle, science-fiction author and blogger
- Israel Regardie, occultist

=== Sports ===
- Zack Greinke, Major League Baseball pitcher
- Joc Pederson, Major League Baseball outfielder
- Justin Turner, Major League Baseball player
- Jrue Holiday, National Basketball Association player

=== Other ===
- David Burtka, chef and actor
- Cara Delevingne, actress and model
- Peter Hurkos, allegedly manifested extra-sensory perception
- James B. Potter Jr., Los Angeles City Council member
- Jerome Vered, record-setting contestant on the game show Jeopardy!
- Joel Wachs, Los Angeles City Council member
- Sam Yorty, mayor of Los Angeles
