= Fox California Theater =

- U.S. National Register of Historic Places
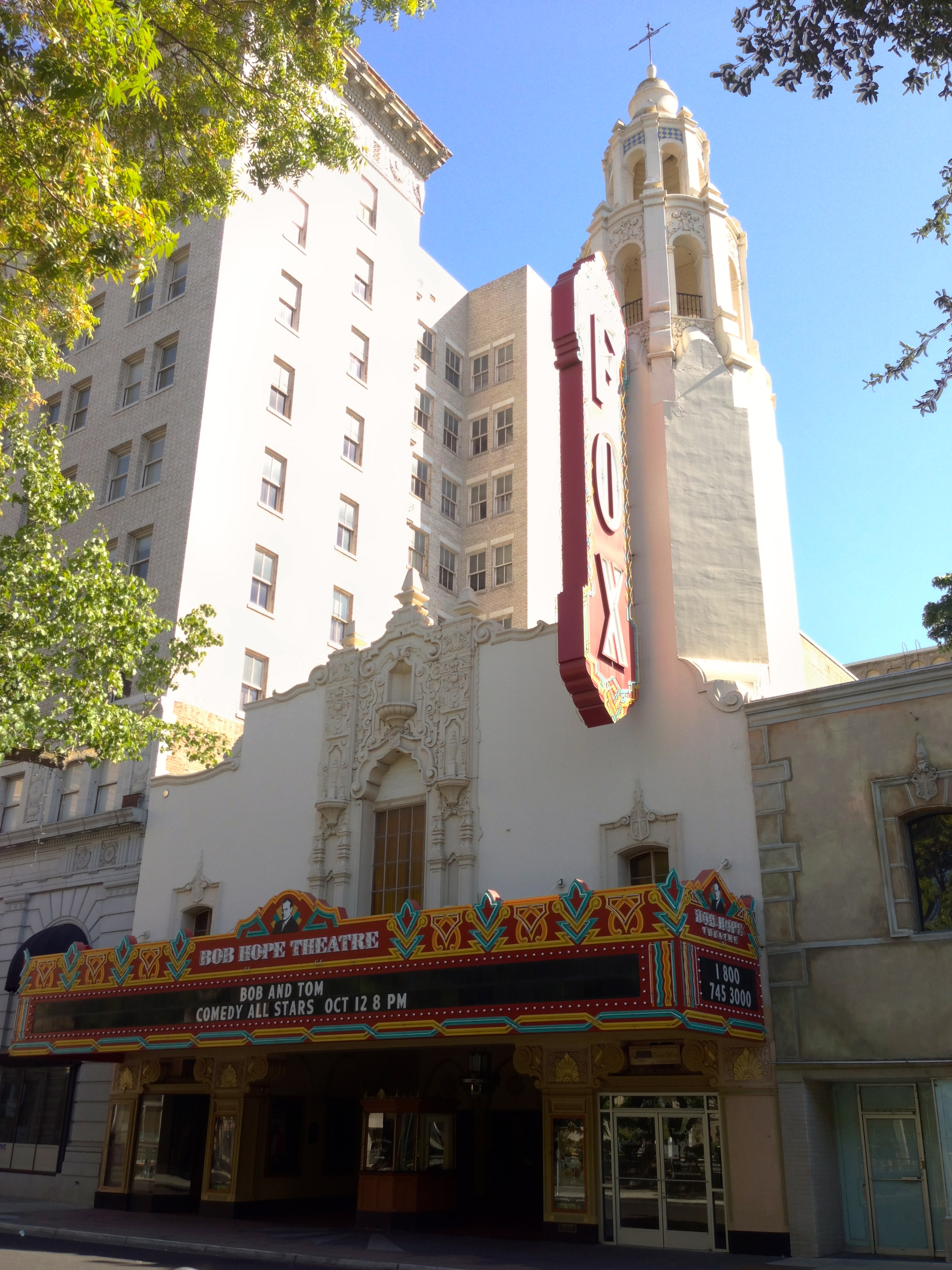
- The theater in 2012

- Location within Northern California
- Location: 242 E. Main St., Stockton, California
- Coordinates: 37°57′09″N 121°17′12″W
- Area: 0.7 acres (0.28 ha)
- Built: 1930
- Built by: Beller Construction Co.
- Architect: Balch & Stanberry
- Architectural style: Colonial Revival, Spanish Colonial Revival
- Website: https://www.stocktonlive.com/venues/detail/bob-hope-theatre
- NRHP reference No.: 79000540
- Added to NRHP: June 27, 1979

Fox California Theater, renamed the Bob Hope Theatre in 2004, is a commercial building in Stockton, California built in 1930. It was added to the National Register of Historic Places in 1979.

== History ==
The site originally hosted T&D Photoplay, the first theater in Stockton. Fox West Coast Theaters leased T&D Photoplay and renamed it The California in 1921. The building was demolished in 1929 and a new theater was built.

The theater has a two-story rotunda with a circular mezzanine, a theater with mezzanine seating and a capacity for 2500 people, a 90 by 30 feet (27.4 m × 9.1 m) stage that is 70 feet (21 m) high, and a lower level with choir rooms, band rooms, offices, and dressing rooms.

The theater opened on October 14, 1930, showing Spencer Tracy in Up the River. Approximately 20,000 people attended the opening celebration.

The Fox Theater closed in 1973, although the building was used for a few events after that date. In 1979, Madeleine Lawton and Edward C. Merlo purchased the building, and nominated it to the National Register of Historic Places. The building was donated to the city in 2000.

== Renovation ==
Restoration of the Fox California Theater was partially funded by Alex G. Spanos who requested that it be renamed the Bob Hope Theatre in honor of his close friend Bob Hope. Additional funds were provided by grants from the United States Congress and from the state's California Bob Hope Heritage Fund.

Renovations included a new sound system and a 1,200 square feet (110 m^{2}) Italian marble floor mosaic. The original chandelier and tile in the exterior lobby were preserved.

As part of the renovation, a 1928 Robert Morton theater organ which had been used to accompany silent movies in Seattle's Fox Theater was restored by Friends of the Fox, a volunteer organization for preserving the theater, and the Sierra Chapter of the American Theatre Organ Society. The refurbished organ made its concert debut in the Bob Hope Theatre in 2005 and is played during classic movie showings.

The refurbished theater reopened in September 2004 with a performance by Jerry Seinfeld.

== See also ==
- Fox Theatres
