= Miramar Theatre =

Historic former movie theater in San Clemente, California

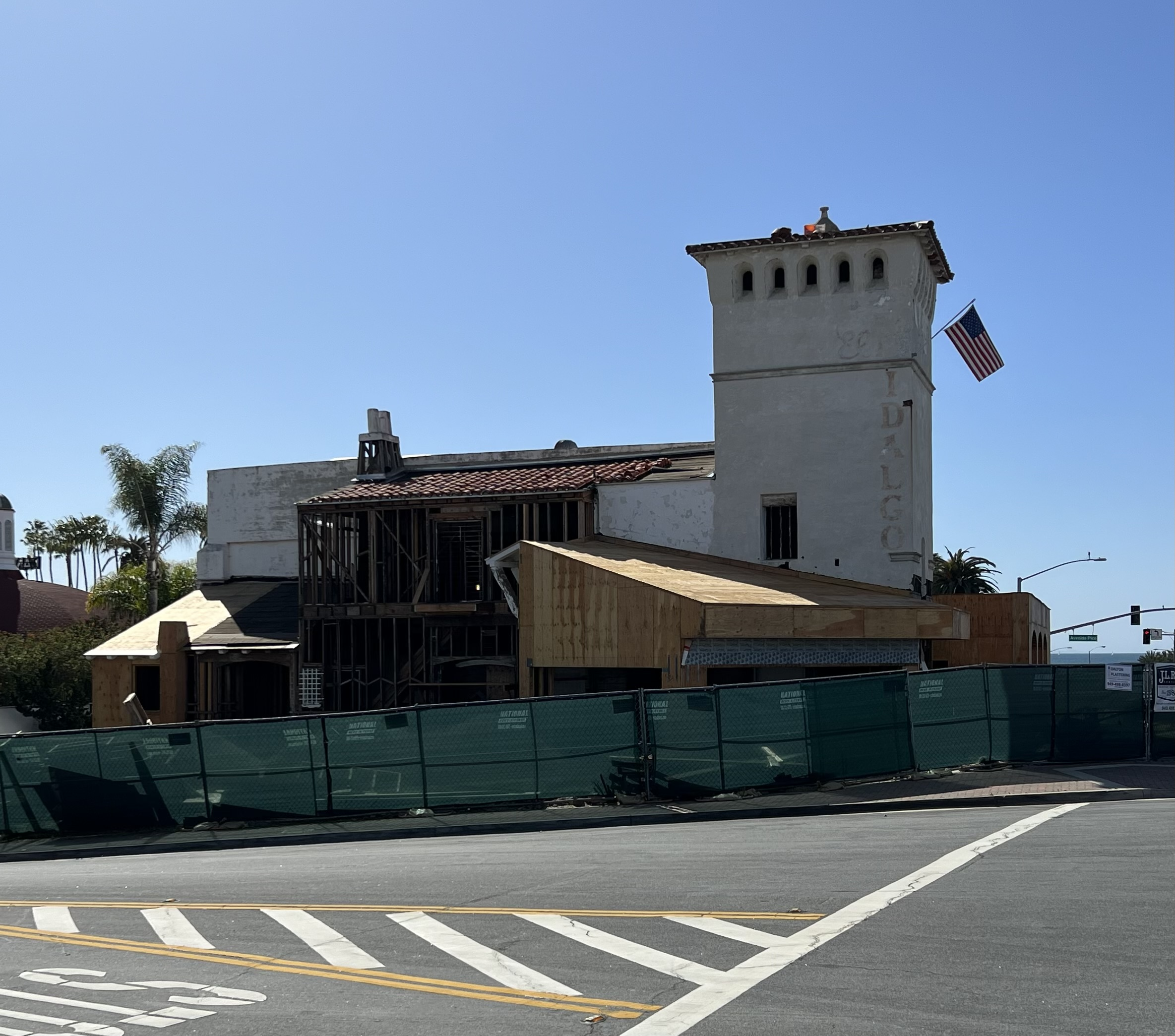
- The theater under renovation in 2024
- Interactive map of Miramar Theatre
- Former names: San Clemente Theatre (1938–1969)
- Address: 1700 N. El Camino Real; San Clemente, California; United States
- Coordinates: 33°25′57″N 117°37′50″W

Construction
- Opened: May 12, 1938; 88 years ago
- Closed: 1992; 34 years ago
- Architect: Clifford A. Balch

The Miramar Theatre is a historic former movie theater and bowling alley in San Clemente, California. Clifford A. Balch designed the building in the Spanish Colonial Revival style and it opened in 1938 as the San Clemente Theatre. The theater closed in 1992 and since has been the subject of various redevelopment and restoration initiatives.

== History ==
In July 1937, the San Clemente Sun announced plans for a US$75,000 movie theater commissioned by Capital Company. Pacific States Theatre, Inc. signed a 15-year lease to operate the venue. Crews from the Strang Brothers construction company broke ground on the project in August 1937 with an expected completion date in December. An opening was set for February 11, 1938; however, this was postponed to allow for additional preparations. The San Clemente Theatre debuted with a gala opening on May 12, 1938, featuring screenings of the feature films Mad About Music and Goodbye Broadway, as well as the short film Moth and the Flame and a Pathé newsreel.

In 1969, the San Clemente Theatre underwent a $150,000 renovation project that included new seats, carpeting, concession stand, decoration, marquee, and box office, among other changes. Architecture firm Pearson & Wuesthoff of Los Angeles designed the venue's remodel. The theater's owner renamed it the Miramar Theatre in the process. It reopened on December 17, 1969, with a San Clemente High School booster event and a screening of Battle of Britain.

Since the Miramar Theatre's closure in 1992, various proposals to repurpose and reopen it have been made. A 1995 multi-part plan to revitalize the North Beach neighborhood of San Clemente in conjunction with the opening of the San Clemente station included a hypothetical reopening of the Miramar as a live entertainment venue; however, it was never realized.

In June 2017, the San Clemente City Council approved plans for a revitalization of the Miramar auditorium as an events center and the former bowling alley as a five-restaurant food court. Construction stalled after a fallout with the general contractor. Officials moved to continue the project in August 2023 with a resubmission of the proposal to the city.
