= Fox Theatres =

Chain of movie theaters in the United States

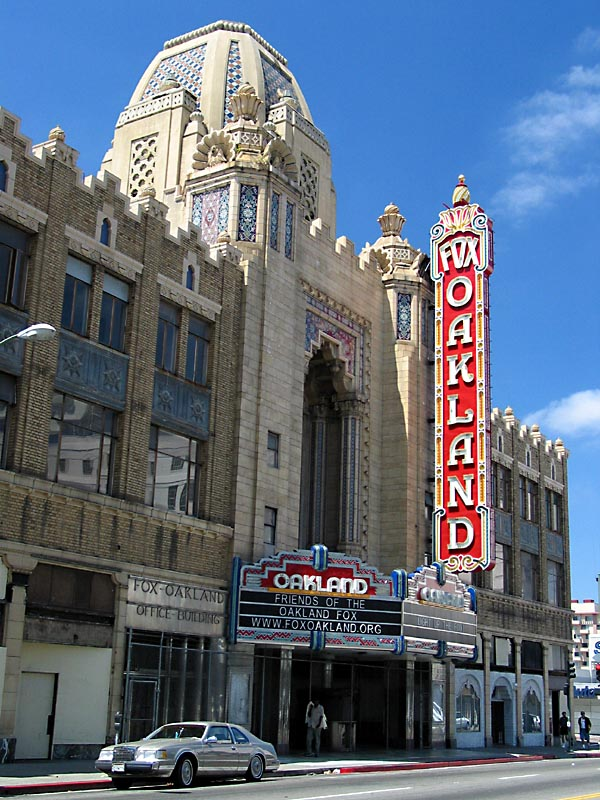
- Fox Oakland in 2002
- Type: Movie theater chain
- Founded: 1920s
- Founder: William Fox
- Defunct: 1934
- Fate: Sold to National Theatres Corporation
- Area served: United States

Fox Theatres was a large movie theater chain in the United States. Their first theaters were built in the 1920s and they merged West Coast Theatres in 1929, creating Fox West Coast Theatres. This merged company was sold to National Theatres Corporation in 1934.

== Architecture ==
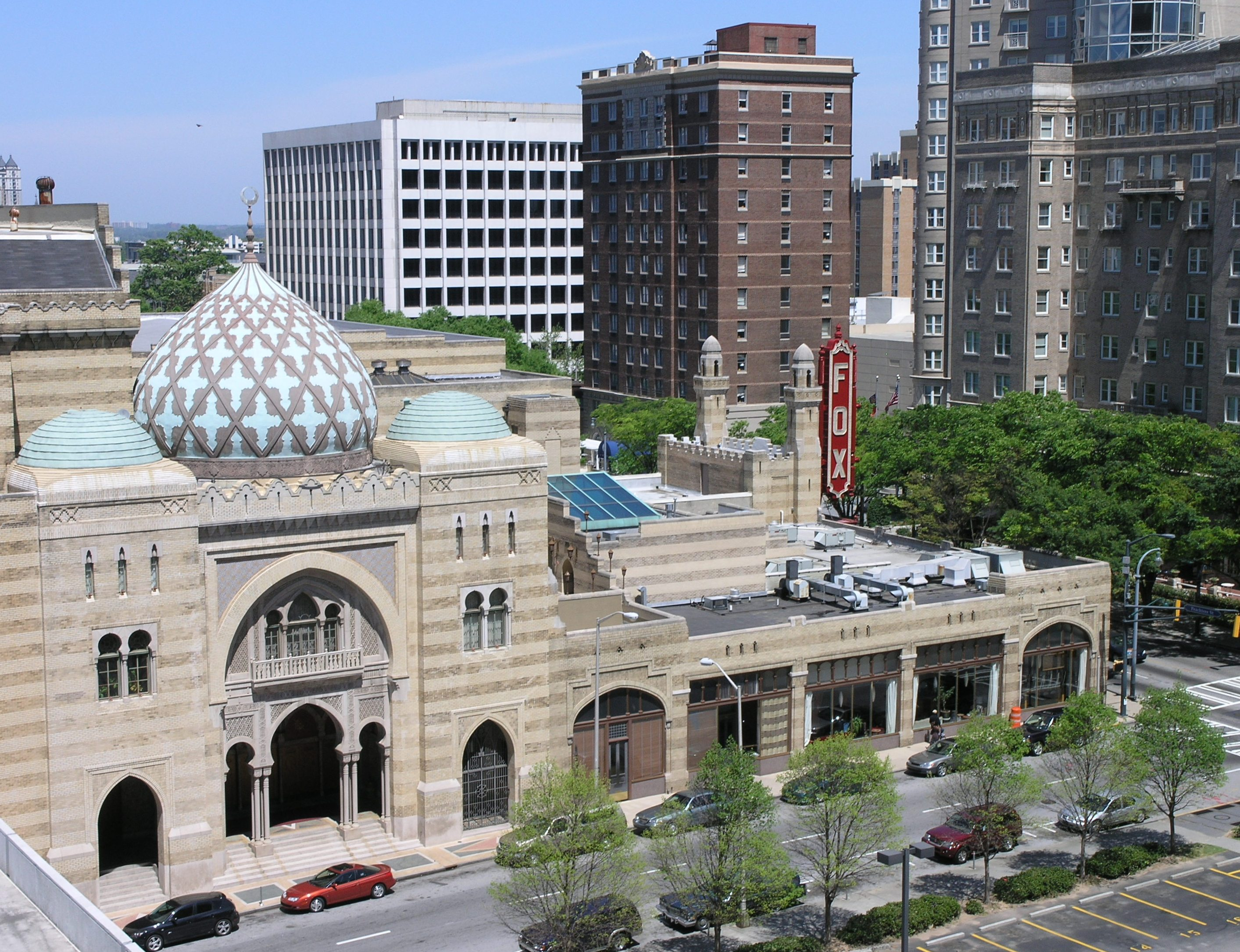
Fox Atlanta featuring Moorish architecture

Many of Fox Theatres's movie palaces were built with a mishmash of architectural styles drawn from Asian, Indian, Persian, and Moorish influences.

== History ==
Fox Theatres was founded by William Fox in the 1920s. The company merged with West Coast Theatres in 1929.

The Great Depression forced Fox West Coast Theatres into bankruptcy. The bankruptcy was initiated c. 1929 and National Theatres Corporation bought the company for $17 million ($409 million in 2025) on November 19, 1934. Bankruptcy proceedings, however, continued until 1954, when a final suit was brought by trustees to vacate the 1933 purchase. The suit was dismissed by United States District Court S.D. New York in 1960.

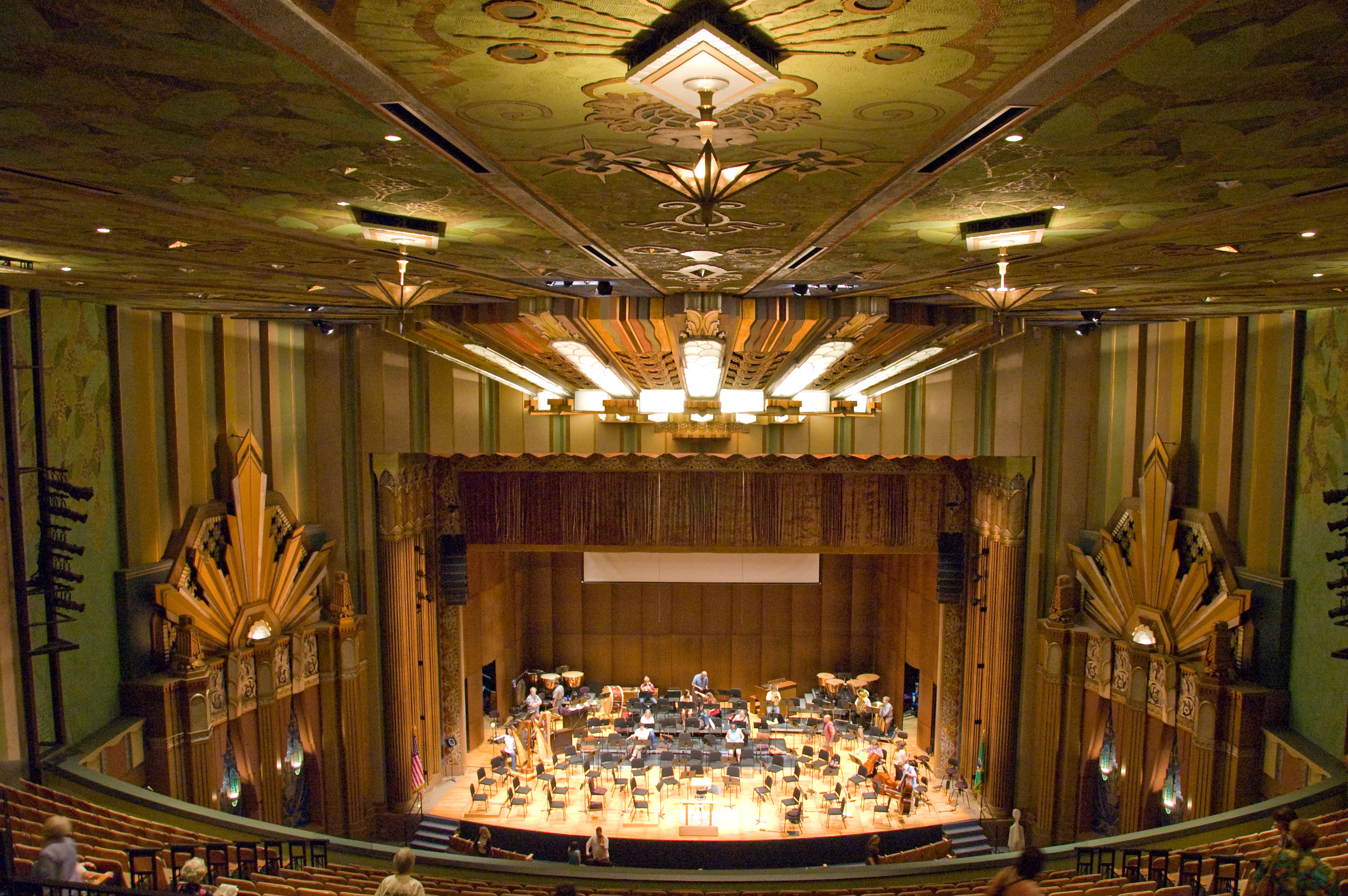
Restored interior of Fox Spokane, 2008

Fox Theatre's surviving theaters share almost identical histories of decline and disrepair. Many were located in urban centers, faltered due to suburbanization, and later underwent preservation and restoration. Many were converted to the performing arts theaters, including the chain's largest theater, Detroit Fox Theatre, which was restored in 1988.

== List of theaters ==
=== California ===
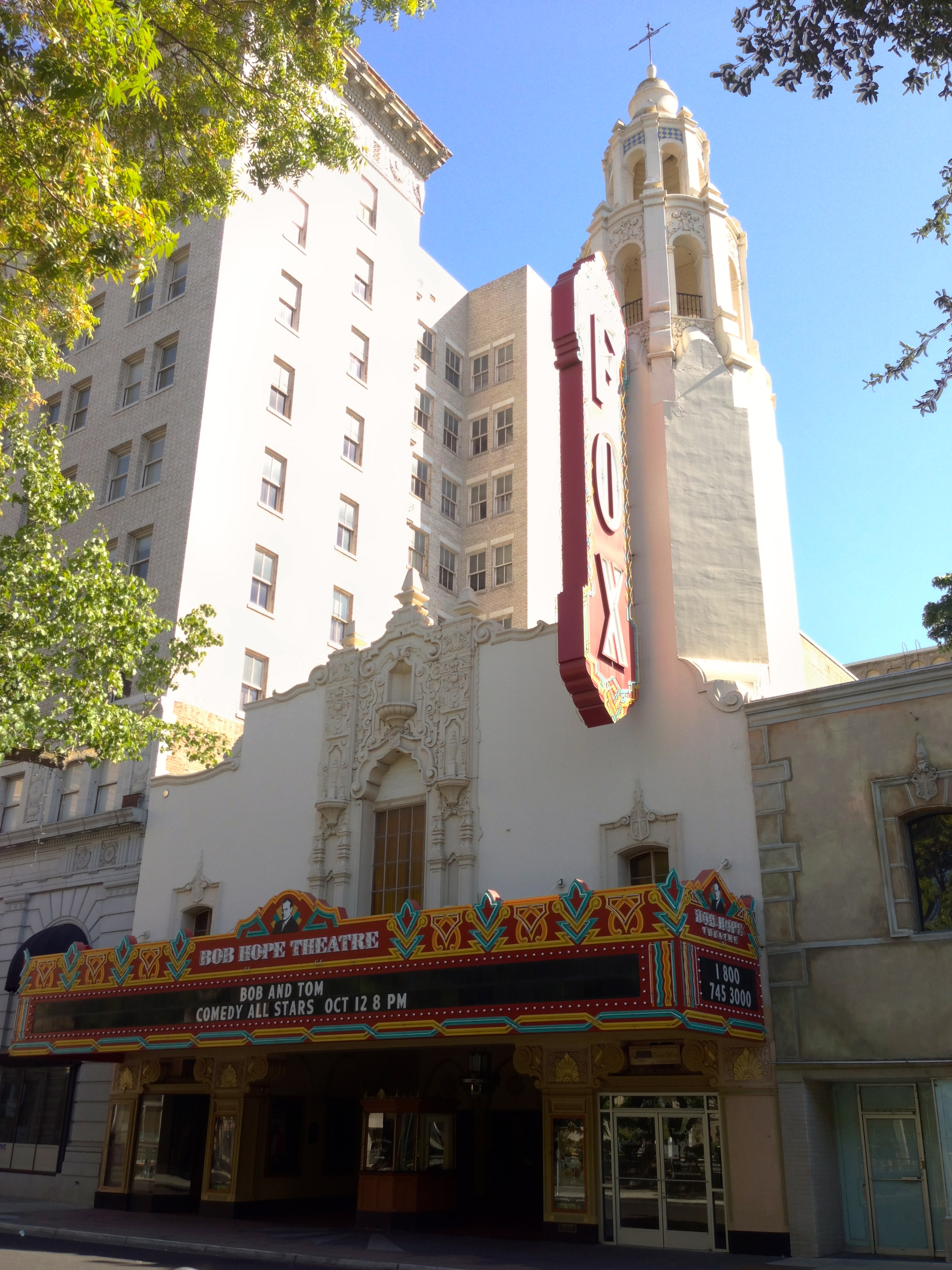
Fox California in Stockton

- Anaheim – opened 1968, 2nd and 3rd screens created in 1974, demolished 1998
- Bakersfield – opened 1930
- Banning – currently open with 3 screens
- Beverly Hills
  - Beverly – leased from 1925 until at least 1953
  - Wilshire – opened September 19, 1930, closed 1977, reopened by Nederlander Theatres as the Saban 1981, currently being restored
- Burlingame
- Costa Mesa – opened 1968, screen divided in early 1970s, closed 2000, demolished 2008, site now occupied by a lawn
- East Los Angeles – opened 1931 as a United Artists Theater
- Fullerton – opened 1925 as the Alician Court Theatre
- Hanford – opened 1929 and is currently used for live concerts, restoration is ongoing
- Hermosa Beach
- Inglewood
  - Academy — opened 1939, closed 1976
  - Inglewood — opened March 31, 1949, closed mid-1980s, vacant
  - United Artists — opened 1931 as a United Artists Theater
- Long Beach
  - Fox Belmont – built 1929
  - United Artists – opened 1931 as a United Artists Theater

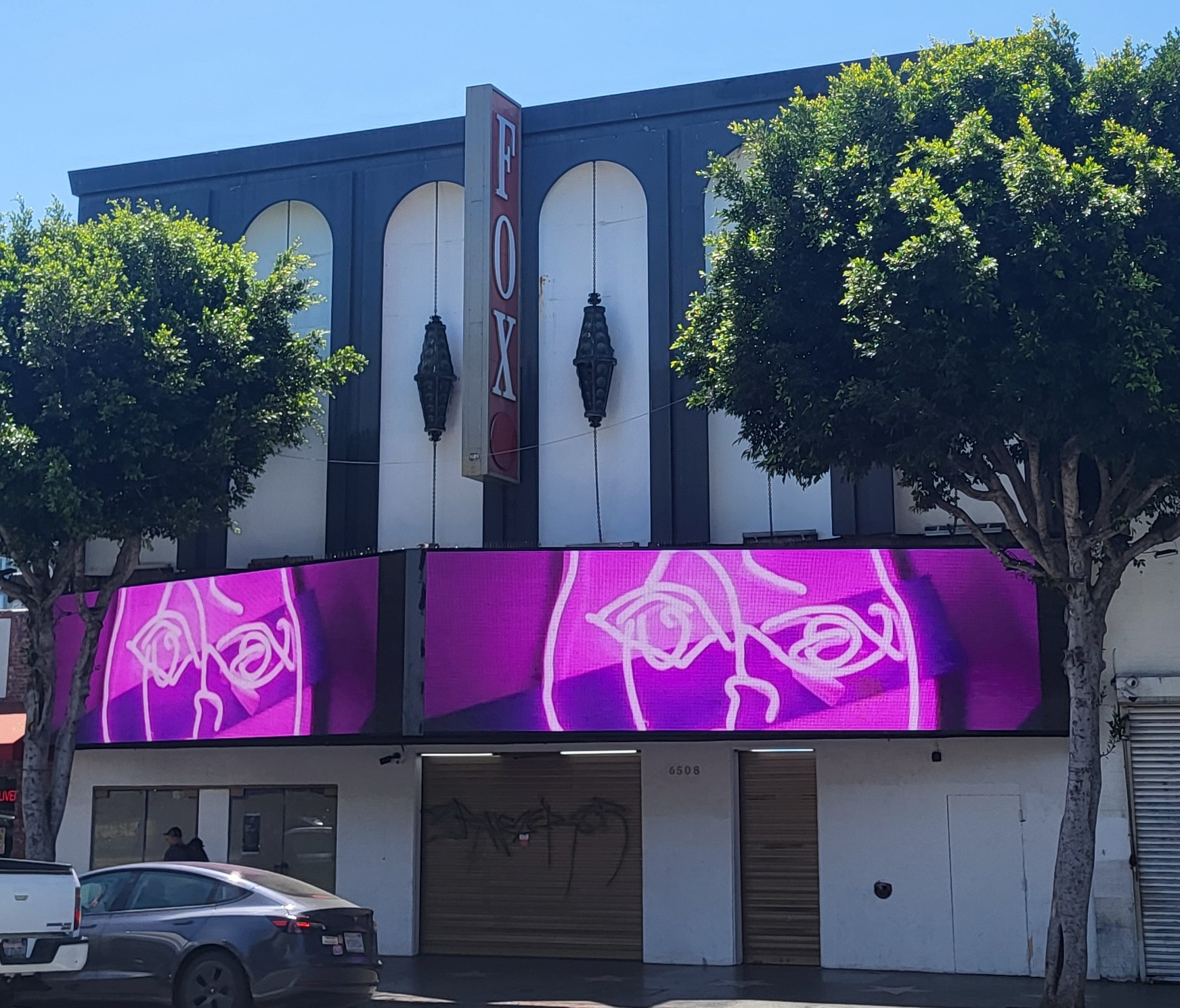
Fox Hollywood

- Los Angeles
  - Adams – open as the Kettering, demolished 1969
  - Criterion – bought c. 1924, sold in the 1930s
  - El Portal – originally owned by West Coast Theatres, taken over by National General
  - Figueroa – opened 1925, closed/demolished late 1960s, site now occupied by a Broadway Federal Bank
  - Florence – opened 1932, closed around 1965, demolished around 1968, site now occupied by a Rite-Aid
  - Four Star – leased in the late 1930s and 1940s
  - Gentry – opened 1938, eventually closed, now divided into multiple retail spaces
  - Granada – bought in 1927, later closed
  - Highland – bought during or before 1938, sold during or before the early 1970s
  - Hollywood – bought in 1965, later sold to Mann Theatres
  - Hollywood – bought during or before 1938, now the Hollywood Museum
  - La Brea – opened 1949, now a church
  - La Reina – opened 1938
  - Metropolitan – owned by Paramount Publix but operated by Fox West Coast Theaters in the 1920s
  - Palace – bought in 1929, sold early 1940s
  - Parisian – bought sometime after 1930, closed 1958
  - Northridge – opened September 11, 1963, subsequently a shoe store, and now a Goodwill thrift shop.
  - Ritz – opened 1926, reopened 1963 as the Lindy Opera House, demolished 1977
  - Stadium – opened 1931, now a church
  - Studio City – opened 1938, closed 1991, now a Barnes and Noble bookstore
  - Uptown – open as early as 1926, closed, and demolished 1965
  - Vogue – bought in 1945, now the Vogue Multicultural Museum
  - Westwood – opened 1931
- Oakland — opened 1928, restored in 2009
- Pasadena
  - Academy — bought in 1942, now operated by Regency Theatres
  - Pasadena — bought and re-opened in 1930, closed in the 1950s
  - United Artists — opened 1931 as a United Artists Theater, bought in 1938, closed 1990
- Paso Robles — opening and closing dates unknown, still standing but abandoned
- Pomona – opened 1931
- Redlands – opened 1928
- Redwood City – opened in 1929, remodeled in the 1950s, listed on National Register of Historic Places in 1993
- Riverside – opened 1929, first theatre to preview Gone with the Wind; restored in 2008–2009, reopened January 2010,
- San Bernardino – opened 1929
- Salinas
- San Diego
  - Egyptian – opened 1923, completely remodeled 1954, closed 1997, demolished 2003
  - Fairmount – opened January 29, 1929, renamed Crest by 1950, closed 1959 and demolished shortly later
  - San Diego – opened 1929
  - Valley Circle – opened 1967, closed/demolished 1998
- San Francisco
  - Parkside – opened 1928, closed 1988, now a daycare
  - Mission Street Showcase – closed in 1957, now a parking lot
  - San Francisco – opened 1929, closed/demolished 1963, site now occupied by Fox Plaza (no relation to the famous Fox Plaza in Los Angeles)
- San Jose – opened 1927, closed in 1973, renovated and reopened in 2004
- Santa Barbara – opened 1930
- Santa Monica – bought early 1930s, sold late 1970s
- Santa Paula – opened on October 12, 1950, the Fox Theatre ran through at least 1968 but was demolished in the late-1980s.
- Stockton – opened 1930, renamed the Bob Hope Theatre
- Taft – opened 1951
- Venice – opened 1951, now an indoor swap meet
- Ventura – opened 1969, twinned December 1982, closed late 1980s, now a Jewelry Couture
- Visalia – opened 1930, reopened 1999
- Watsonville – closed 2009

=== Elsewhere ===
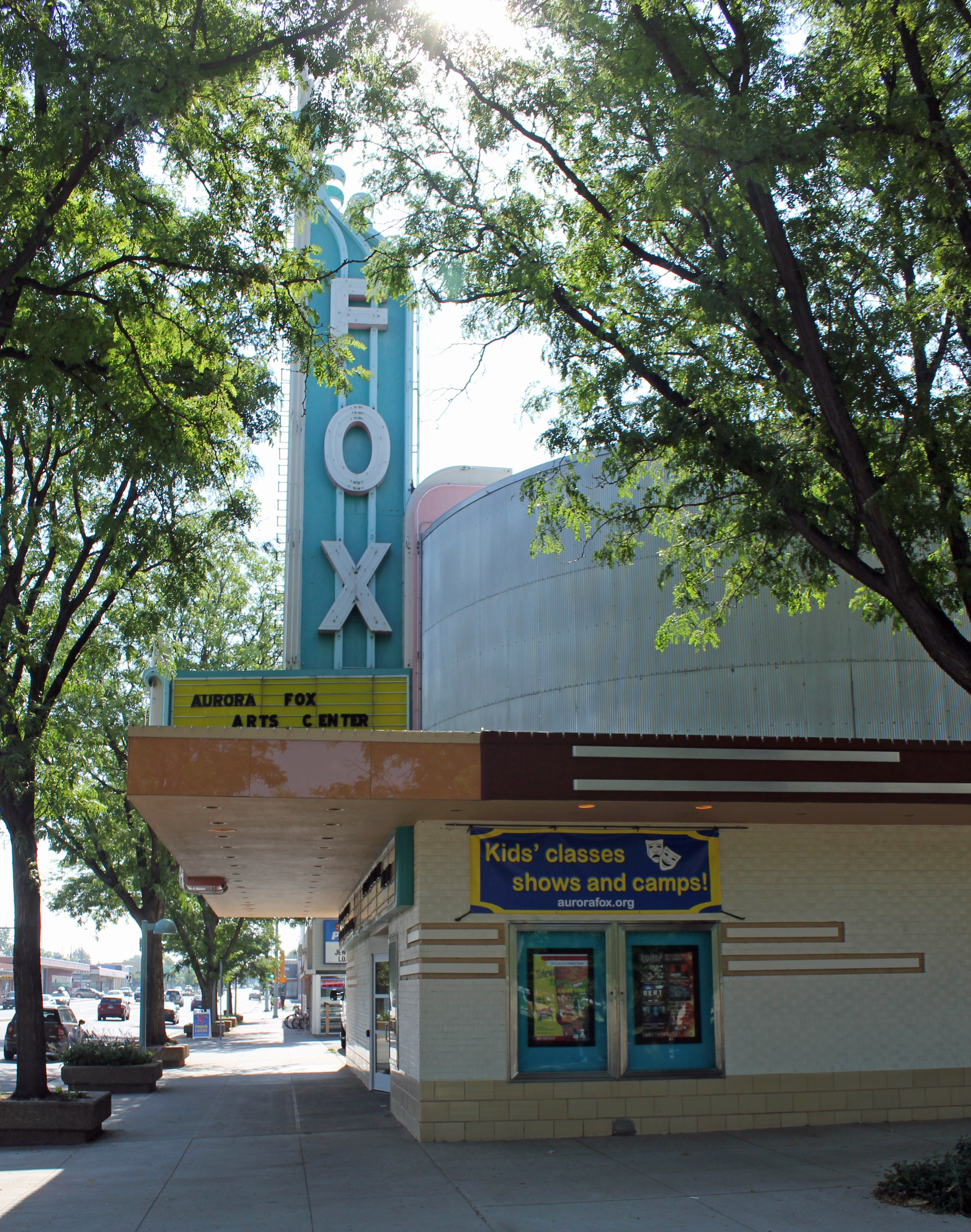
Fox Aurora

- Amarillo, Texas – opened 1967, closed 1992, demolished 1993
- Atlanta, Georgia – opened 1929
- Aurora, Colorado – opened 1946
- Aurora, Illinois – opened 1935
- Billings, Montana – opened in 1931, sold in 1978
- Boulder, Colorado – opened 1926 as the Rialto Theatre
- Britt, Iowa
- Brooklyn, New York
  - Alba – opened 1929, operation later handed over to Randforce Amusement Corporation, closed 1970, eventually demolished, site now occupied by a hospital
  - Brooklyn – opened August 31, 1928, demolished 1971, site now occupied by Con Edison
  - Congress – opened 1927, later taken over by Randforce, vacant as of 2006
  - Meserole – opened 1921, originally operated by Small & Strausburg, later taken over by Fox West Coast, then by United Artists, closed 1978, now Rite Aid
  - Savoy – opened September 1, 1926, operation taken over by Randforce Amusement Corporation 1933, eventually became Charity Neighborhood Baptist Church, demolished 2014
- Bunkie, Louisiana – opened 1945, closed early 1960s, now city hall
- Centralia, Washington – opened 1930. Closed 1990s.
- Detroit, Michigan – largest Fox theatre, opened 1928, fully restored 1988
- El Paso, Texas – opened in 1965, and was the first in Texas. Has since been demolished.
- Forest Hills, New York – opened September 14, 1929, demolished late 1950s
- Green Bay, Wisconsin – opened February 14, 1930
- Hutchinson, Kansas – opened 1931
- Joplin, Missouri – opened 1930, now converted to a church
- Kingsport, Tennessee – opened 1944, closed no later than 1963, was a country music recording studio into the early ’90s, now a beauty salon
- Las Cruces, New Mexico – opened 1926, acquired by Fox in 1929, restored in 2005
- Las Vegas, New Mexico
- Dayton, Ohio – opened 1967, sold by 1975
- Kettering, Ohio – opened 1966, sold by 1975
- McCook, Nebraska – opened January 28, 1927, now a live theater
- North Platte, Nebraska – opened 1929, now a live theater
- Missoula, Montana — opened December 8, 1949, demolished now
- New Orleans, Louisiana — opened 1941, closed/demolished 1975
- Philadelphia, Pennsylvania — opened 1923. Closed and demolished in 1980.
- Phoenix, Arizona
  - Phoenix – opened July 30, 1931, demolished 1975
  - Chris-Town – opened 1967, 2nd screen added 1971, 3rd through 11th screens added 1996
- Ponce, Puerto Rico — opened 1931, closed in 1980; now a hotel
- Portland, Oregon – opened 1911, demolished April 1997
- Provo, Utah – opened 1967, closed 1986, demolished
- Salina, Kansas – opened 1932, closed 1987, given to City 1989, restored by non-profit and reopened 2003 as a performing arts center (still in use 2018..)
- Salt Lake City, Utah – opened July 10, 1968, screen divided into 2 December 1976, screens 3 & 4 added 1977, closed February 14, 2002, demolished late 2000s, site now vacant
- San Antonio, Texas – opened 1969 as Fox Twin Theatres, renamed Fox Central Park 3 Theatres in 1974, screen 1 divided 1984, closed mid 1990s, demolished 2003
- Seattle, Washington – opened 1929, renamed Roxy in 1933
- Spokane, Washington – opened 1931
- Springfield, Massachusetts – opened February 26, 1970, now a "Carpetland & More Inc" store
- Springfield, Missouri
- St. Louis, Missouri – opened 1929, restored in 1982

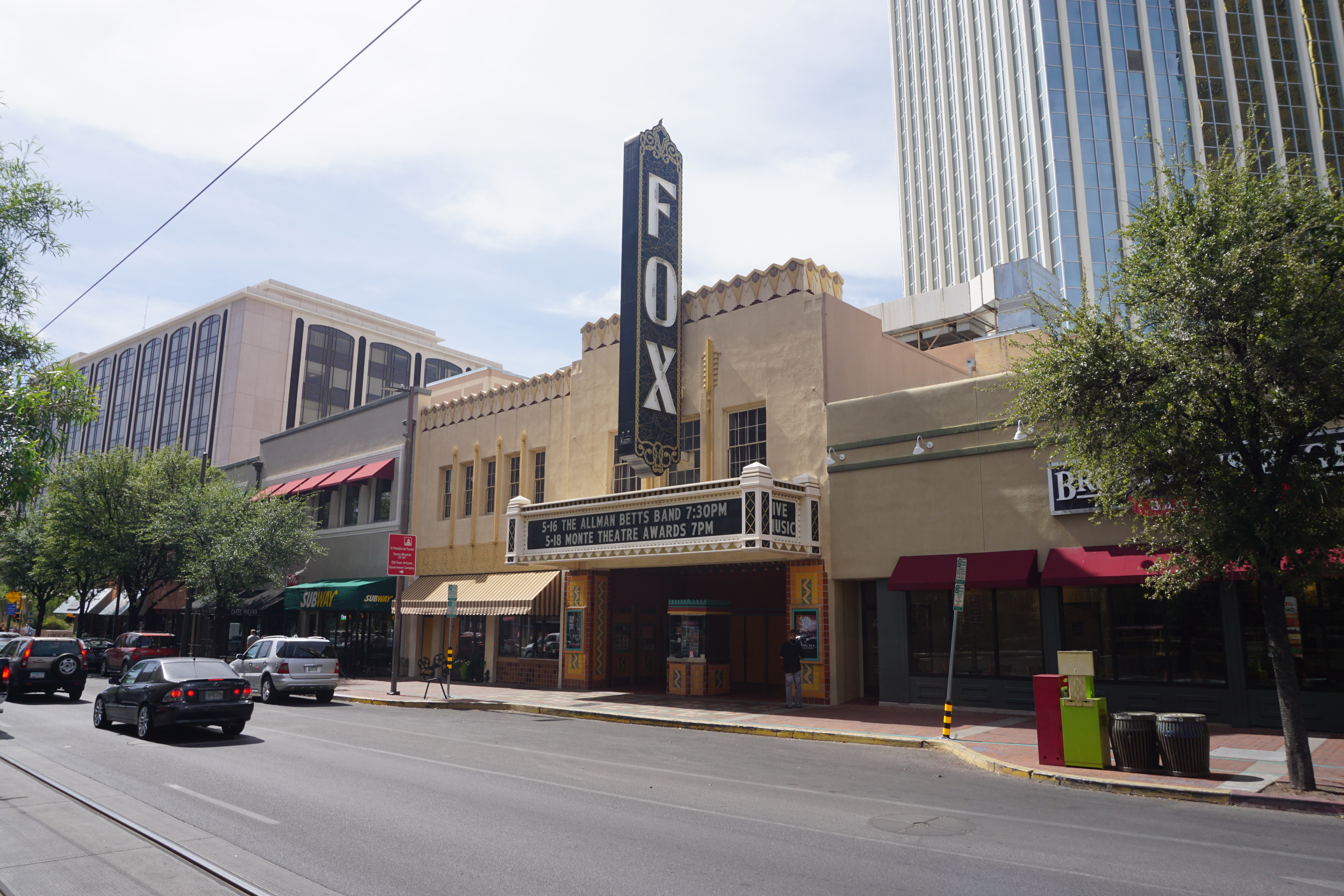
Fox Tucson

- Tucson, Arizona
  - Buena Vista – opened February 10, 1967, 2nd screen added in 1972, closed early 1990s, reopened 1995, closed late 1997 to early 1998, demolished 2008, site now occupied by Hampton Inn & Suites
  - Lyric – opened as early as 1919, operated by Fox West Coast as early as March 19, 1949, in operation as late as May 21, 1963, since demolished, site now occupied by Pima County building
  - Tucson – opened 1930, closed 1974, reopened 2005
  - 22nd Street Drive-In – opened June 2, 1954, closed and demolished 1979,
- Wichita, Kansas – opened October 23, 1969
