= United Artists Pasadena Theater =

Former movie theater in Pasadena, California

- Interactive map of United Artists Pasadena Theater
- Address: 600-606 East Colorado Boulevard; Pasadena, California
- Coordinates: 34°08′45″N 118°08′16″W
- Capacity: 912 at opening
- Screen: 1
- Current use: Retail

Construction
- Opened: October 21, 1931
- Renovated: 1960, 1997
- Closed: 1990
- Architects: Clifford A. Balch; Walker & Eisen

United Artists Pasadena Theater is a historic former movie theater located at 600-606 East Colorado Boulevard in Pasadena, California.

== History ==
Clifford A. Balch and Walker & Eisen worked together to design United Artists Pasadena Theater, one of thirteen Art Deco theaters designed for United Artists by the trio. This theater opened on October 21, 1931 with a screening of New Adventures of Get Rich Quick Wallingford. The capacity at opening was 912. Construction was budgeted at $70,000 ($1.48 million in 2025).

The theater was used as a preview house during its early years, and by June 1938, the theater was operated by Fox West Coast Theaters.

United Artists retook ownership of the theater in 1990 and the theater closed later that year. The building remained empty until 1997, when the interior was converted to retail. The original facade was also restored during this remodel. A school supply store, gym, and restaurant have occupied the building since.

== Architecture ==
United Artists Pasadena Theater features an Art Deco design with a facade that includes twin artwork on either side of a central spire.

In 1960, a metal panel facade was added to the building. The original marquee and a portion of the original Art Deco facade were also removed during this remodel, however, the facade was later returned to its original design.

== Historic designation ==
On May 19, 1994, the state of California designated the Pasadena Playhouse Historic District, however United Artists Pasadena Theater was deemed a non-contributing property due to its 1960 remodel. The building's exterior was later returned to its original design, after which it was nominated for historic designation in 2011 and designated as an individual resource on August 24, 2015. The listing also states that should the Pasadena Playhouse Historic District be re-evaluated, United Artists Pasadena Theater would be re-classified as contributing.
