= Frederick Dahnken =

Frederick Dahnken (April 19, 1897 in New York, New York – June 1, 1971) was an owner of movie theaters in the United States. According to the August 3, 1921 New York Clipper, the Turner & Dahnken Circuit was one of the largest independently owned picture playhouses in the country. It operated the Tivoli Opera House, and T & D theaters in Oakland, Berkeley, Richmond, Sacramento, San Jose, Stockton, Watsonville and Salinas. At the time, they also owned the franchise for First National Pictures in Northern California and a part of the State of New York.

In 1922, West Coast Theatres, Inc., purchased the rights, franchises, leases and theatres held by the Turner & Dahnken Circuit, which at the time controlled forty theaters in California.
