= Fox Theater Pomona =

- U.S. National Register of Historic Places
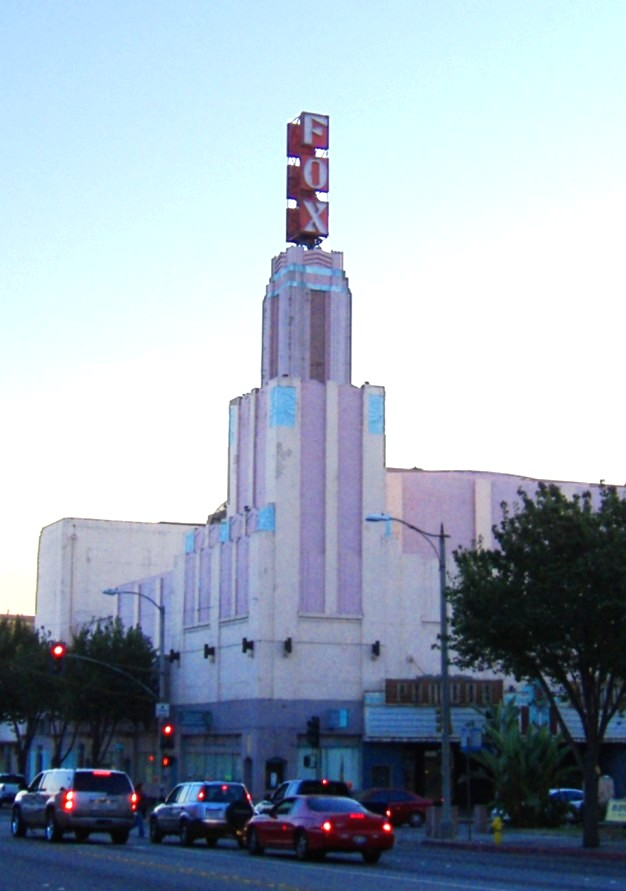
- Fox Theater Pomona
- Location: 114 W 3rd St. Pomona, California
- Coordinates: 34°03′24″N 117°45′02″W
- Area: Los Angeles
- Built: 1931
- Architect: Clifford A. Balch, Floyd E. Stanbery
- Architectural style: Art Deco (Hollywood Egyptian Style)
- NRHP reference No.: 82002201
- Added to NRHP: February 19, 1982

The Fox Theater Pomona is a fully restored Art Deco movie palace from Hollywood's golden age in Pomona, Los Angeles County, California. Today the Fox Theater Pomona is a state-of-the-art venue for concerts, cinema, performances, and parties. It is the flagship attraction of the Pomona Arts Colony, a vibrant neighborhood of galleries, nightclubs, lofts, and restaurants.

== History ==
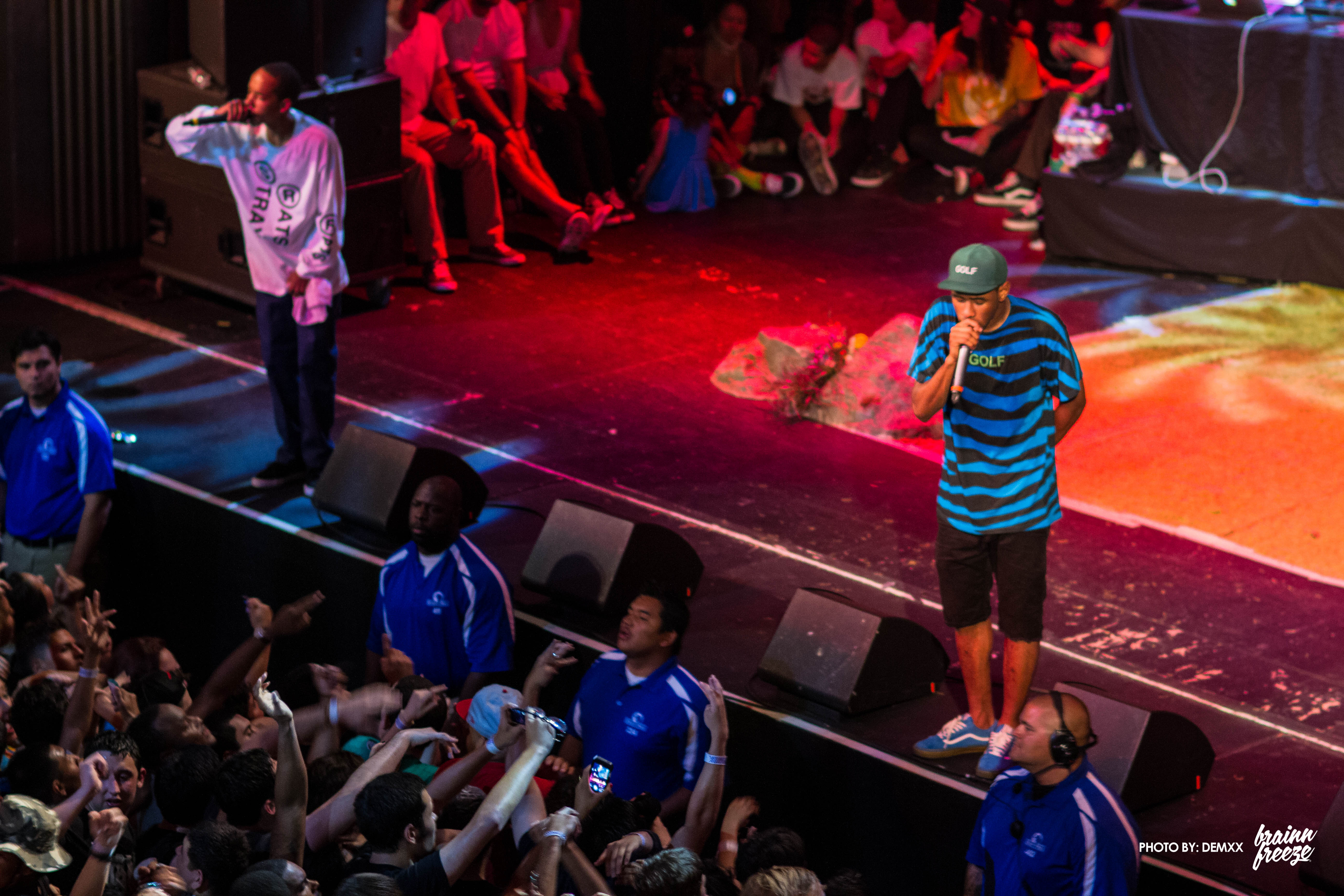
Tyler, the Creator and Earl Sweatshirt performing at the theater in 2013.

Opened on April 24, 1931, the Fox Theater Pomona operated as a first-run motion picture theater for 50 years. The classic "Hollywood Style" art deco building with its soaring tower was designed by the firm of Balch & Stanberry and was frequently used by Hollywood studios to host sneak previews of their upcoming films in order to poll general audience reactions. The theater went into decline along with other large, single screen theaters in the early 1970s as a result of the increasing popularity of multiplex theaters. It survived for a few years showing Spanish language movies, then closed in 1977.

Partly as a result of citizen activism, the city of Pomona bought the building. In 2002 the non-profit Pomona Fox Corporation was founded to explore means of preserving and reusing the theater, but they were not able to secure enough funding for their restoration efforts. In February 2007 the building was sold to its current owners, the Tessier family (who are also responsible for the creation of the Pomona Arts Colony concept and re-developers of many local buildings of historical importance) and their family-owned Gerald Investments. 10 million dollars was spent restoring the building into a beautifully revamped venue for the arts, music and film. After two years of restoration, The Fox Theater Pomona reopened on May 21, 2009, with a capacity for roughly 2,000 attendees. It has been ranked #23 in LA Weekly's top 50 Venues in LA.

== Concerts ==
The theatre has hosted numerous bands such as Blur, Crystal Castles, Green Day, Megadeth, Marilyn Manson, Morrissey, Oliver Tree, Paramore, Slowdive, Tame Impala, Twin Tribes, Tyler The Creator and Twenty One Pilots.

== Location ==
114 W 3rd St. Pomona, CA 91766
Pomona, California
