= Vogue Theatre (California) =

Former movie theater in Hollywood, Los Angeles

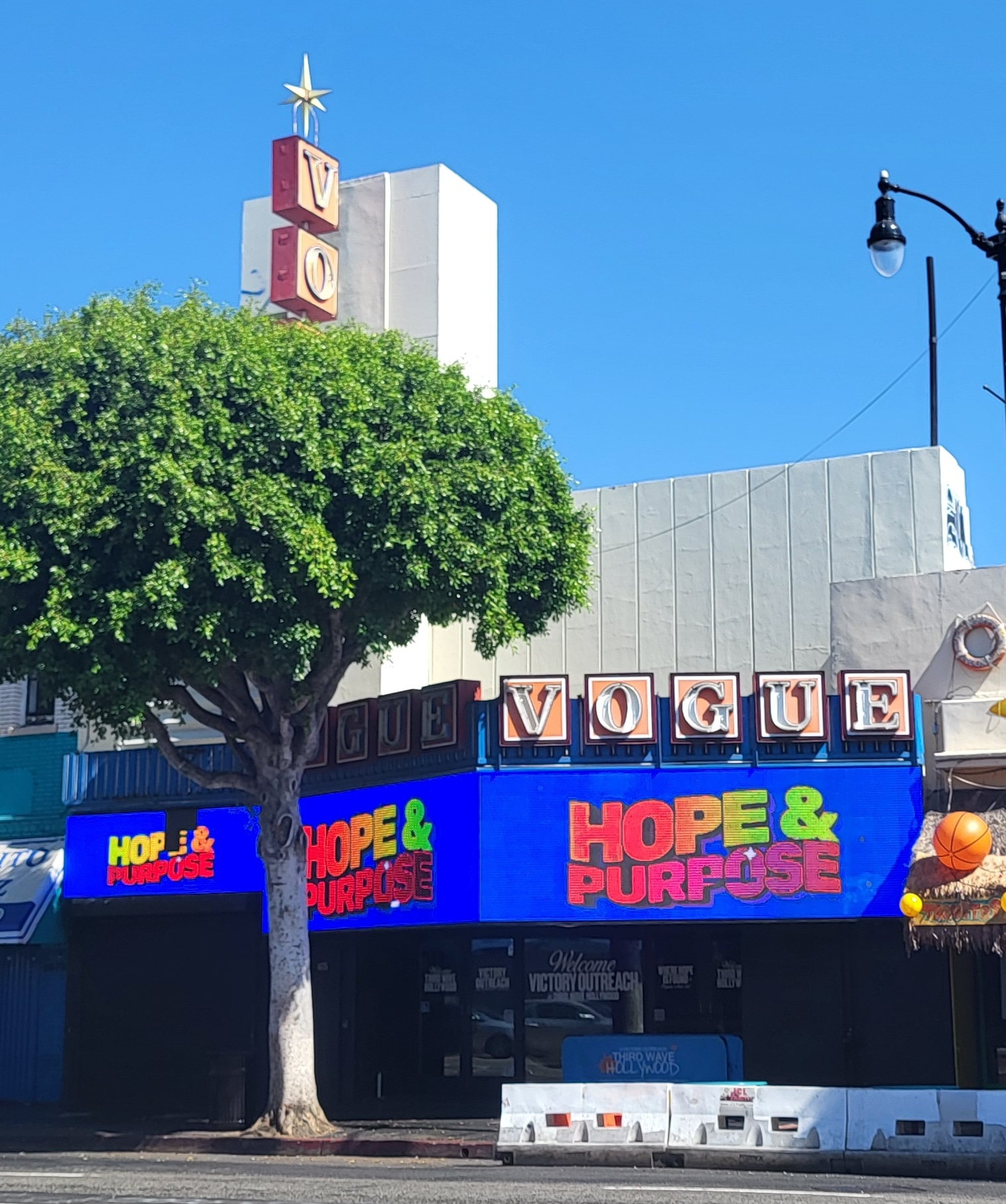
- The building in 2024
- Interactive map of Vogue Theatre
- Address: 6629 Hollywood Boulevard, Hollywood, California
- Coordinates: 34.102°N 118.334°W
- Capacity: 897
- Type: Indoor movie theater

Construction
- Opened: July 1935
- Renovated: 1959
- Closed: 2001
- Years active: 1935-1995
- Architect: S. Charles Lee

Vogue Theatre was a historic movie theater located at 6629 W. Hollywood Boulevard in Hollywood, California. It has housed the Vogue Multicultural Museum since 2021.

== History ==
Vogue Theatre was built as an 897-seat movie theater by S. Charles Lee, who was responsible for many theaters in Los Angeles, including the nearby Hollywood Theater and Holly Cinema. The theater was originally designed with a Streamline Moderne exterior and American Colonial interior. It opened either on July 9, 1935 showing Ladies Crave Excitement or on July 16, 1935 showing The Phantom Fiend.

Fox West Coast Theatres operated the theater from July 10, 1945, and the theater was modernized by J. Walter Bantou and J. Arthur Drielsma in July 1959, at a cost of $250,000 ($2.76 million in 2025).

In 1985, the Hollywood Boulevard Commercial and Entertainment District was added to the National Register of Historic Places, with Vogue Theatre listed in the district. The listing notes that the theater was "representative of the concentration of entertainment facilities in the district" but also was "heavily altered" and "lacks visual integrity". Ultimately, it was not considered a contributing property.

Mann Theatres took over operations of this theater in the early 1990s, and in 1995, it closed as a movie theater. For a short time after, the space was used for psychic performances and as a film location. In December 2001, the theatre fittings were stripped out and sold off.

In 2010, the theater re-opened as a music club, restaurant, and performance space, but it closed in 2015. In March 2018, the theater re-opened again, this time as a free museum called Screenbid, an offshoot of the online auction house ScreenBid.com, but they moved out in 2019. In early 2020, the space was once again advertised as for lease.

In 2021, the theater housed the Vogue Multicultural Museum, whose first exhibit was a traveling exhibition showcasing fifty years of the band Pink Floyd. The theater has been home to Victory Outreach Ministries International and the Third Wave Hollywood Church since 2023.
