= Fox Performing Arts Center =

Theater in Riverside, California

- Fox Theater
- The Fox Performing Arts Center in 2026.
- Interactive map of Fox Performing Arts Center
- Address: 3801 Mission Inn Avenue; Riverside, California; United States
- Owner: City of Riverside
- Operator: Live Nation
- Capacity: 1,646
- Type: Movie palace
- Screen: 1
- Current use: Live event venue

Construction
- Opened: 1929
- Reopened: 2010

Website
- www.riversidepac.com

Fox Theater
- Location within California
- 33°59′2″N 117°22′30″W

Site notes
- Architect(s): Balch and Stanbury
- Architectural style: Spanish Colonial Revival
- Website: www.foxriverside.com

Riverside Landmark
- Reference no.: 39

The Riverside Fox Theater, also known as the Fox Performing Arts Center, is a Spanish Colonial Revival style building constructed in 1929 in the heart of downtown Riverside, California. The theater is the centerpiece of Riverside's Arts & Culture initiative and underwent a major renovation and restoration to become a regional performing arts facility. Renovation was completed in the Fall 2009, with a grand-reopening in January 2010.

The theater is best known for being the first theater to screen the most successful film in box-office history when adjusted for inflation, the 1939 film Gone With the Wind.

== History ==
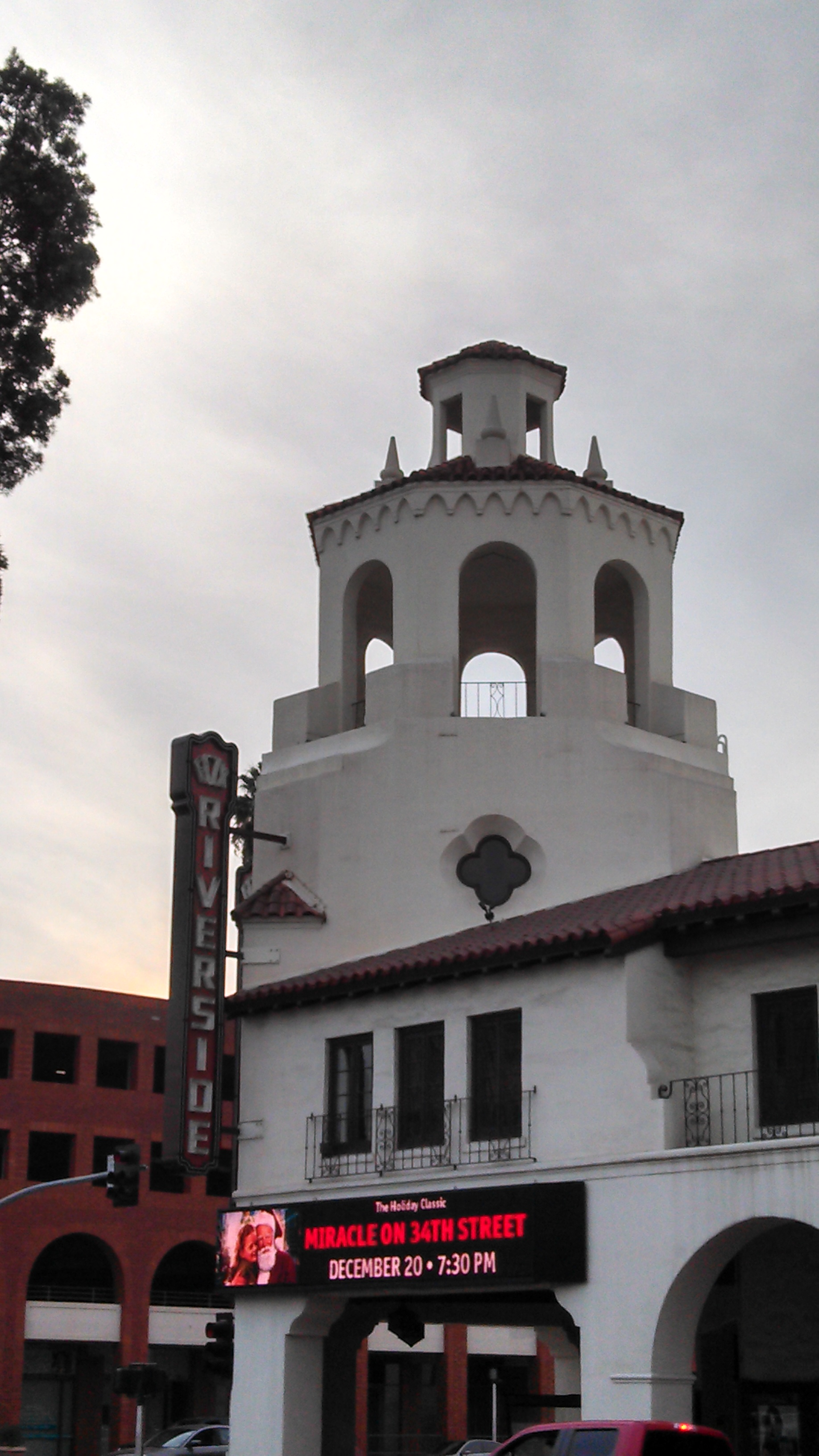
Fox Theater tower in 2013

The Riverside Fox Theater was designed by Los Angeles-based architects Clifford Balch and engineer Floyd E. Stanberry, who were responsible for designing many of the "West Coast Theaters," and later, Fox Theaters. The theater was part of a chain of West Coast theaters built by Abe and Mike Gore, Adolph Ramish, and Sol Lesser. This partnership constructed neighborhood theaters in the Southern California area throughout the 1920s. In 1928, this group sold a controlling interest to William Fox of Fox Studios and the corporation became known as Fox West Coast Theaters. This alliance with Fox created a seamless production to distribution system for the film industry. The partnership was short-lived, however, due to both antitrust regulations and Fox's own financial difficulties. The corporation went into bankruptcy in the early 1930s. The theater came under control of the Skouras Brothers in 1932 and became part of the National Theaters chain, the largest and most successful theater chain in US history.

Throughout the 1930s and 1940s, the Fox Theater was used by the Hollywood-based film industry to show previews of future releases before final editing. Riverside was considered a useful preview site because it represented, demographically, small town America. By previewing their future releases in Riverside, the film companies believed they could register the reaction to their movie within the country's largest viewing demographic without having to travel too far.

=== World War II and later years ===
During World War II, the building served as a makeshift dormitory after the soldiers from the nearby military bases filled the city's available sleeping spaces. Manager Roy Hunt allowed the soldiers to sleep on the thick carpets of the lobby and auditorium. In 1942, the Fox Theater converted its stage and surrounding dressing rooms into a 536-person secondary theater named the "Lido," which served as a "second-run" film house for headline pictures. Alterations and additions to the original design included the small secondary theater in the former stage house, alterations to the proscenium and various new sound absorption finishes in the auditorium.

After World War II, changing demographics and fading fortunes of the surrounding neighborhood combined to decrease the viability of the Fox Theater. In 1978, the theater was acquired by Walnut Properties who used the main auditorium to show Spanish language films, while the Lido Theater became the "Pussycat Theater" where adult films were shown.

Determined eligible for entry to the National Register of Historic Places, the Fox Theater, located at the intersection of Mission Inn Avenue and Market Street, is today recognized as an important locale in the history of motion pictures.

== Renovation ==
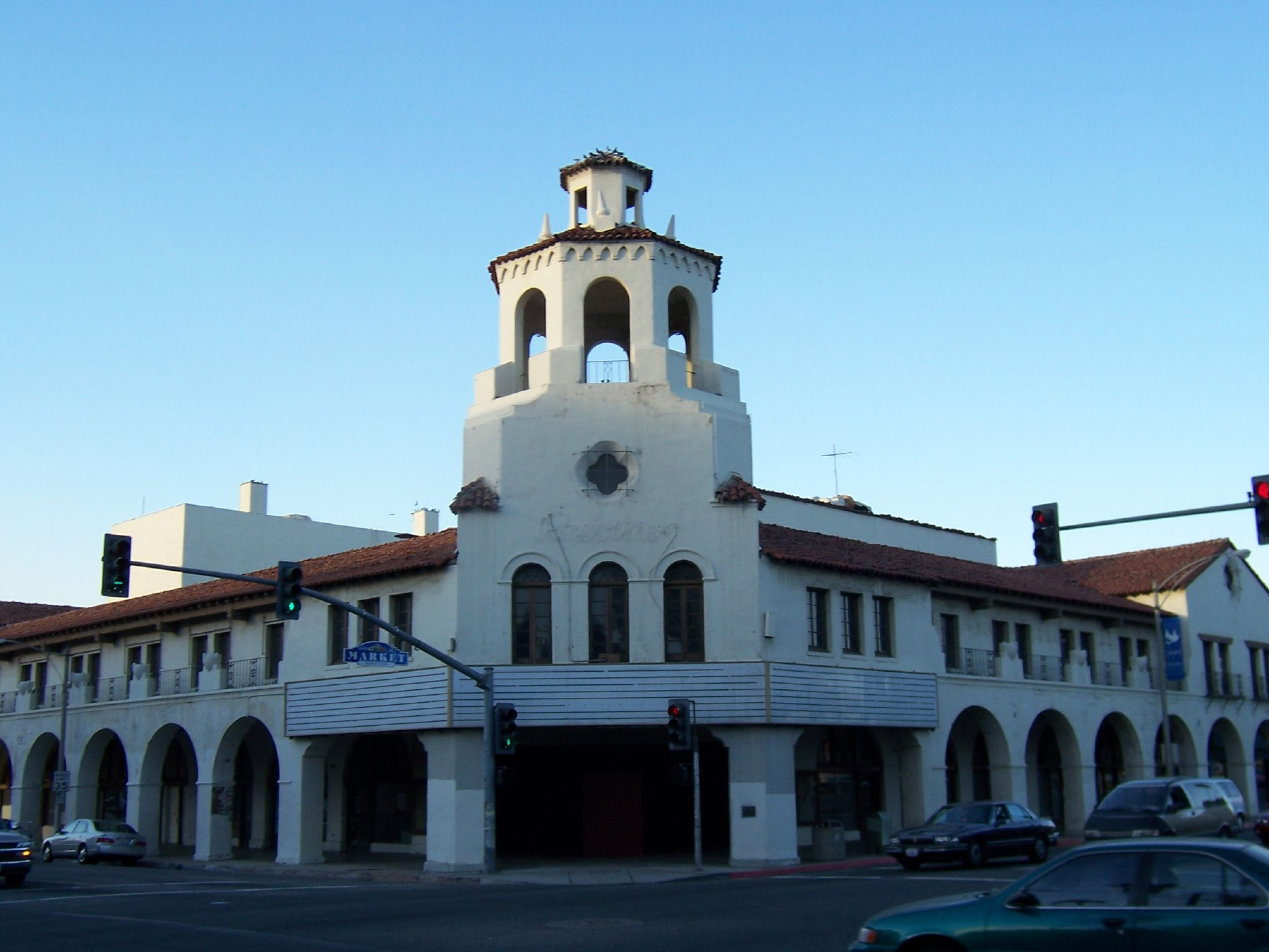
The Fox Theater in 2005 before renovations.

In 2006, the City of Riverside acquired the property in order to provide a performing arts facility in the downtown area for community use. The renovation of the Fox Theater was part of a $1.68 billion "Riverside Renaissance" program. The Riverside Renaissance program anticipates completing more projects in five years than were completed over the last 30. The $35 million renovation of the Fox Theater began May 3, 2007 and was completed late 2009.

== New operators ==
After reopening, FX Arts Management operated the venue for almost 4 years, and contracted with the Nederlander Corporation for two years. After that they contracted with Tom McCoy and Cathy Rigby for their Broadway performances. Live Nation took over operations as of December 1, 2013.

== See also ==
- House Of Blues
- De Anza Theater
