= La Reina Theater =

Former movie theater in Los Angeles, California

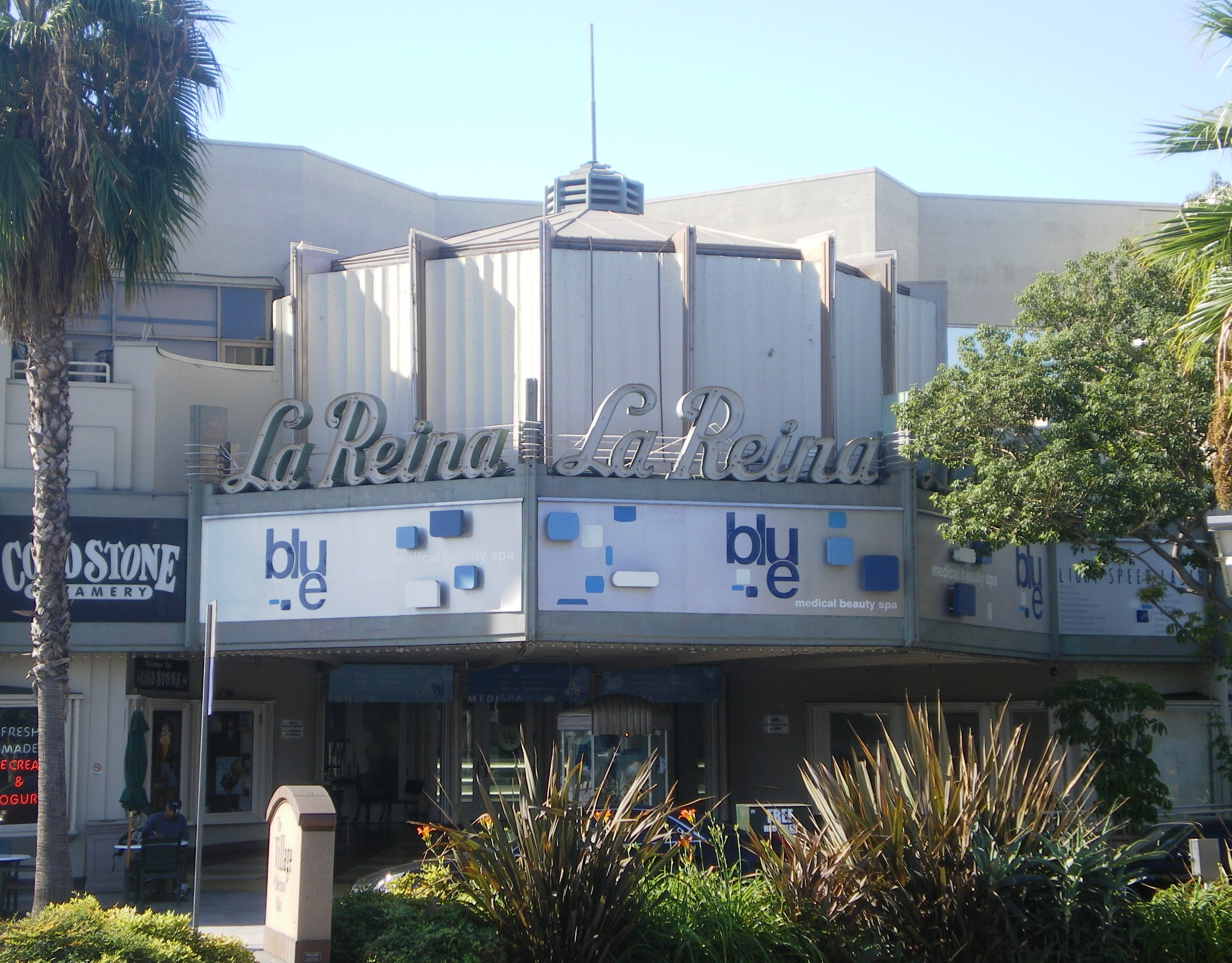
- The structure in 2008
- Interactive map of La Reina Theater
- Address: 14626 Ventura Boulevard, Sherman Oaks
- Coordinates: 34.1515°N 118.4526°W
- Capacity: 875
- Type: Movie theater

Construction
- Built: 1937-38
- Closed: April 4, 1986
- Architect: S. Charles Lee

Los Angeles Historic-Cultural Monument
- Designated: February 15, 1985
- Reference no.: 290

La Reina Theater was a historic movie theater located at 14626 Ventura Boulevard in Sherman Oaks, California.

== History ==
La Reina Theater was designed for Fox West Coast Theaters by S. Charles Lee, an architect known for numerous theaters throughout southern California. Built in 1937–38, the theater sat 875 and the cost of construction was $60,000 ($1.37 million in 2025).

The theater was designated Los Angeles Historic Cultural Monument #290 on February 15, 1985. In doing so, the city blocked a developer's plan to raze the building and replace it with a shopping center.

The theater closed on April 4, 1986. Its final operator was Mann Theatres and its final screening was a private double feature of The Robe and There's No Business Like Show Business, attended by 300 visitors. The theater's last public screening was Police Academy 3 the day prior.

The theater's tower and vertical sign were removed due to damage from the 1994 Northridge earthquake. The facade, marquee, entrance, terrazzo and box office remain, while the auditorium was demolished and a retail building built in its place.

== Architecture and design ==
La Reina Theater featured a streamline moderne design with terrazo decorations and a neon exterior. It was considered "a mini-movie palace" and "one of the most beautiful theaters in the San Fernando Valley."

The theater's auditorium was simplified compared to other theaters of the time; it featured pared down artwork instead of ornate embellishments.
