= Fox Theatre Inglewood =

- U.S. National Register of Historic Places
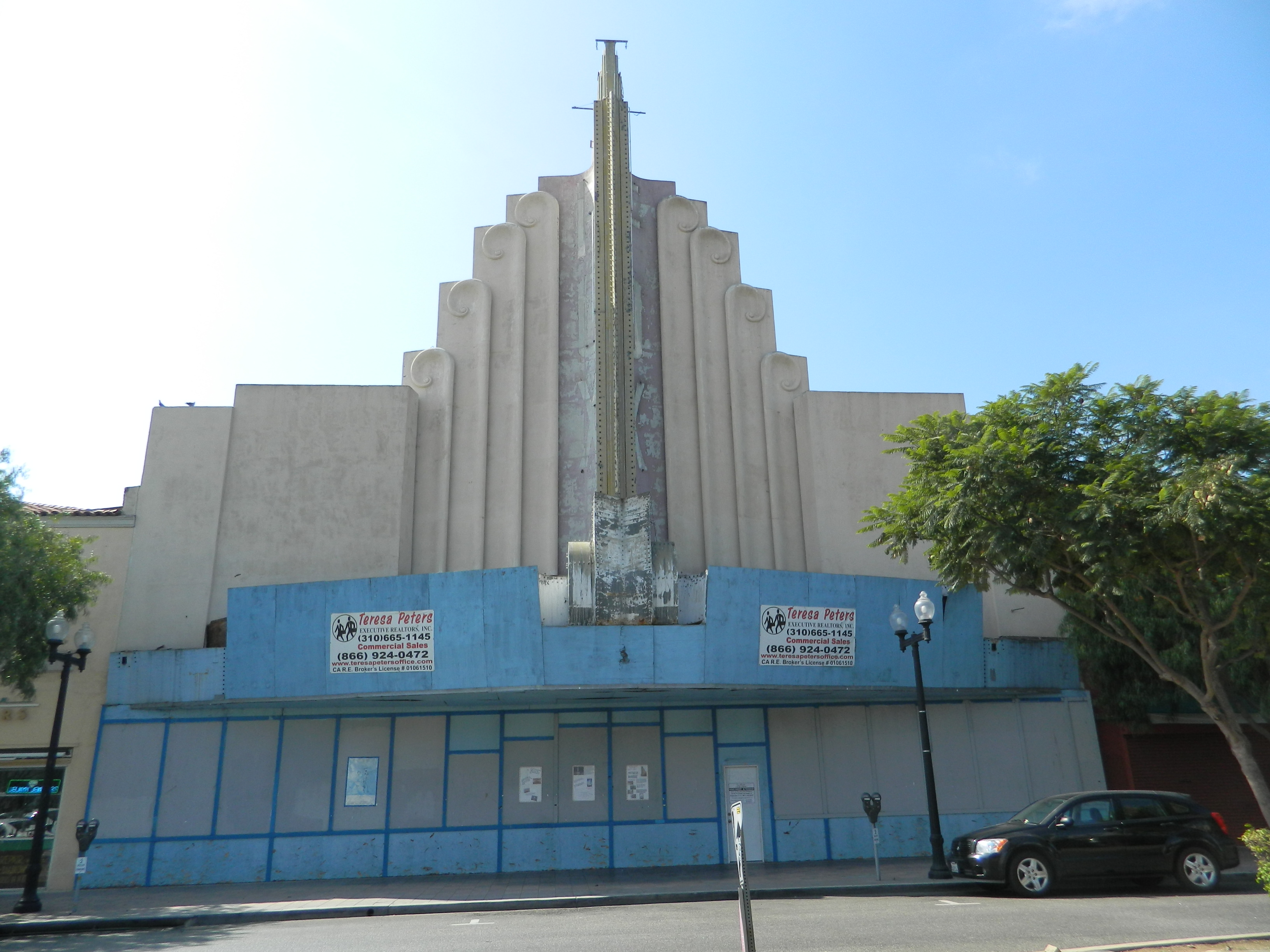
- Location: 115 N. Market St., Inglewood, CA
- Architect: S. Charles Lee
- Architectural style: Streamline Moderne
- NRHP reference No.: 12001163
- Added to NRHP: January 14, 2013

The Fox Theater Inglewood in downtown Inglewood, California is a now-closed but architecturally significant movie theater that is listed on the National Register of Historic Places. The building, designed in the Streamline Moderne style, was designed by S. Charles Lee in 1949.

== History ==
The Fox Theater opened on March 31, 1949 on the former site of the Granada Theater, which was destroyed by a fire in 1944. Built by Fox Theatres, it was the last theater built by the chain, before the United States v. Paramount Pictures, Inc. case prohibited movie studios, in this case 20th Century Fox, from owning movie theaters and hold exclusive rights where their movies were shown. After this, 20th Century Fox continued to show previews of films at the Inglewood theater before releasing. There were various owners that continued to operate the Fox Theater. The theater showed Spanish films up to its closing in 1988. It is said to have been "destroyed by a fire" in 1993.

In 2009, a group called the Inglewood Fox Theater Alliance was formed to raise awareness and support to restore the now abandoned theater. In 2013, the theater was listed in the National Register of Historic Places.

== Design ==
The Fox Theater is a 1,008 seat theater designed by S. Charles Lee (exterior) and Carl G. Moeller (interior). The theater had many amenities, such as a "cry room", which was a soundproof room where people could bring their children without disrupting others. It also had air conditioning, assistance for the hearing impaired, state of the art sound system, and automatic opening lobby doors.
