= De Anza Theatre =

Former theatre in Riverside, California

Coordinates: 33.97856°N 117.37883°W

The De Anza Theatre is an office building and former theatre with approximately 800 seats located at 4225 Market Street in Riverside, California in the United States. The De Anza was designed circa 1937 by Fox West Coast theater architect S. Charles Lee and constructed circa 1938 by local Riverside builder T.C. Prichard. Southern California-based Lee had "one of the most celebrated and prolific careers" in the history of theatre design; the De Anza is the only Lee building in Riverside. Architectural photographer Julius Shulman shot the Streamline Moderne-style building at the time of opening; Shulman "did not merely document significant architecture, but interpreted it, becoming one of the most important and influential architectural photographers in history."

The De Anza is one of two surviving historic theater buildings in Riverside (the other being the former Fox Riverside). In 2013 the De Anza Theatre building was deemed eligible for listing on the California Register of Historical Resources as an architecturally significant local landmark. However, the building's state of preservation was deemed inadequate (it lacked "sufficient integrity") for it to be listed on the National Register of Historic Places.

== Architecture ==
The De Anza was one of a scant handful of Art Deco buildings that were ever build in Riverside. According to the Riverside Modern Resources Survey, "While the style was popular throughout southern California during the 1930s, there are few examples simply because there was so little construction activity during the Depression. The finest example of the style in Riverside is the De Anza Theater by S. Charles Lee...the corners of each end of the street-facing elevation are rounded. A tall, fluted, curving pylon supports a blade sign and attracts the attention of passing motorists. On the second story the windows are visually connected by thin horizontal bands." The bands are "speed lines—thin parallel lines resembling the trail left by a speeding object in comic strips" to create an illusion of movement on the exterior of the building. Other notable Streamline Moderne decorative elements include "the vertical sign, the curved and glazed corners, the lines of coping on the second-story north corner, the piers of the second-story south corner, the asymmetrical massing, the row of windows on the north elevation, and the terrazzo design at the box-office floor."

The styling of the theatre is described as "modest, simplified...appropriate for a small city." Like several of Lee's theaters of the era, the building featured a large "ladies' lounge." There was a bas relief wood carving of Juan Bautista de Anza's arrival in California in the lobby, and additional bas relief carvings adjacent to the screen within the auditorium. The De Anza's Moderne look is representative of Lee's stylistic transition during the late 1930s, moving from period-revival styles to more contemporary designs.

=== Photographs ===
Per UCLA Special Collections, "Julius Shulman, captured the new theatre in full sunlight with deep shadows; his image accentuates the dramatic black and white contrasts and the sculptural forms of the building...Shulman's photograph [of the foyer] takes advantage of the strong natural light from the windows to create a study in light and shadow."

== History ==
The theatre opened on June 6, 1939, with a screening of Young Mr. Lincoln starring Henry Fonda. The De Anza was one of three Riverside theaters operated by Roy Hunt in partnership with Fox West Coast, along with the Golden State Theater and the Rubidoux. Originally jointly owned by National Theatres Corp. (a subsidiary of 20th Century Fox) and independent operator Hunt's Theatres, following the 1948 Paramount Decree prohibiting vertical integration in the American film industry, the De Anza was part of Fox's divestment agreement with the Justice Department.

In the 1950s the De Anza screened pioneering 3-D format films such as It Came from Outer Space. On December 21, 1951, the De Anza was the site of one of two test screenings of the final cut of Singin' in the Rain. The Theatre marquee was refaced in 1957. During the 1980s and early-1990s the theatre was used as a live music venue hosting bands such as Blue Öyster Cult, Danzig, Cheap Trick and Megadeth.

According to the Riverside Modernism report, the "exterior of the building retains a high level of integrity; however, the interior was altered in 1989."
