= Tower Theatre (Fresno, California) =

Historic theater in Fresno, California

Coordinates: 36.7580°N 119.8014°W

Tower Theatre for the Performing Arts
- Tower Theatre (1939-80); McHatton's Tower Theatre (1980-89)
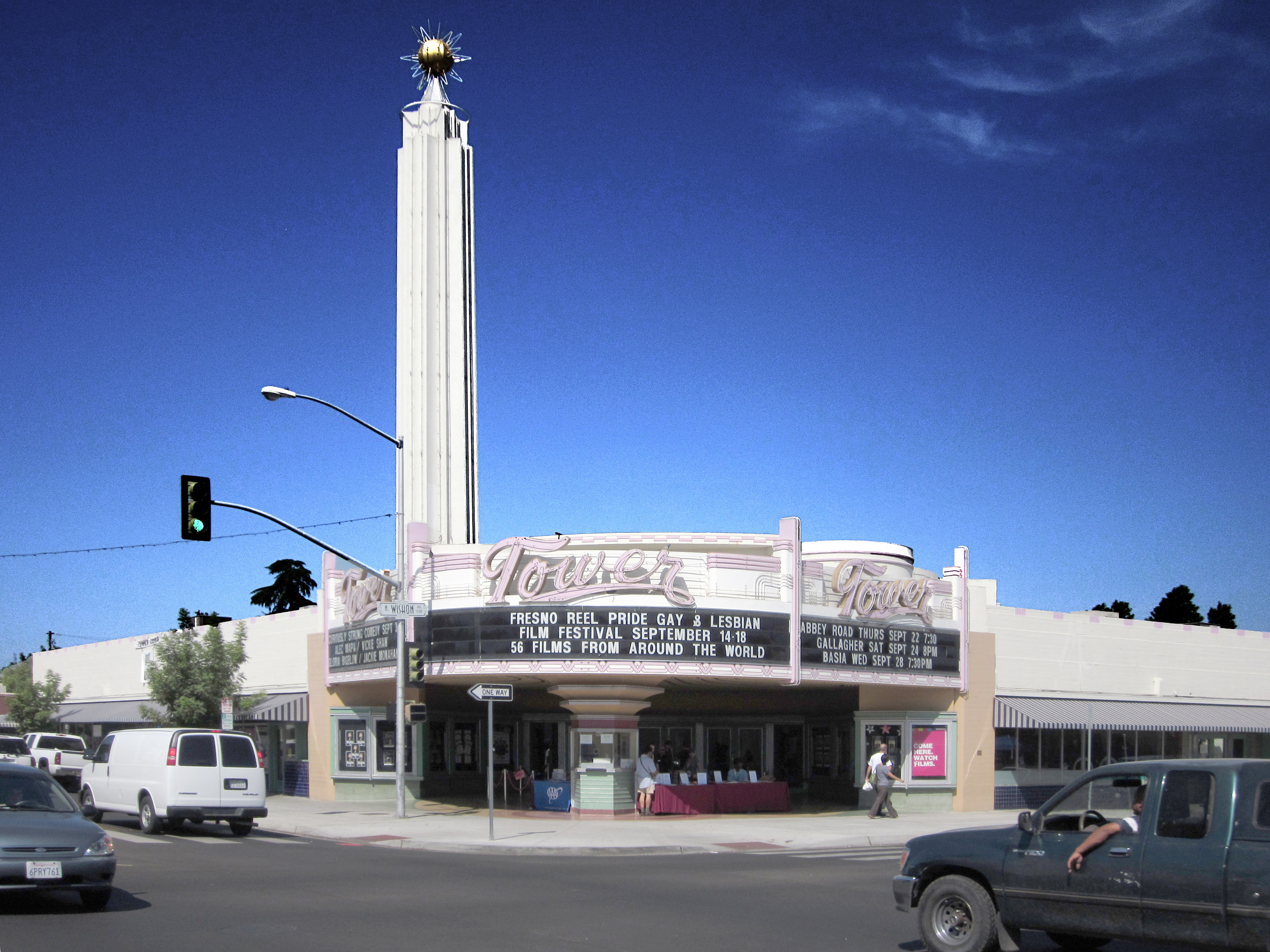
- Exterior of venue (c.2011)
- Interactive map of Tower Theatre for the Performing Arts
- Address: 815 E Olive Ave; Fresno, CA 93728-3332
- Owner: City of Fresno
- Capacity: 761
- Type: Performing arts center

Construction
- Opened: December 15, 1939
- Reopened: March 13, 1990
- Rebuilt: 1989-90
- Architect: S. Charles Lee

Website
- Venue Website
- Tower Theatre
- U.S. National Register of Historic Places
- Location: Fresno, CA
- Built: 1939
- Architect: S. Charles Lee
- Architectural style: Streamline Moderne
- NRHP reference No.: 92001276
- Added to NRHP: September 24, 1992

The Tower Theatre for the Performing Arts is a historic Streamline Moderne mixed-use theater in Fresno, California. Built in 1939, it opened to the public on December 15, 1939, under the management of Fox West Coast Theater Corporation. The building was designed by S. Charles Lee, with its tower inspired by the "Star Pylon" at the 1939 New York World's Fair. The theater underwent a renovation and reopened as a performing arts center in 1990, after being closed as a repertory cinema in 1989 due to financial troubles.

== History ==
The theater in 1987

The theater is located in a part of Fresno that had been developing into a shopping area since about 1923. Discussions of building a theater in the neighborhood began as early as 1927. The first of three proposals for a theater was made on December 3, 1938, published in The Fresno Bee. Fox West Coast Theater Corporation, in cooperation with A. Emory Wishon, proposed a $200,000 theater similar to the S. Charles Lee-designed Ritz Theatre in Westwood, Los Angeles. The project would be built on the whole block at the northwest corner of Olive and Wishon Avenues. The property was owned by the Wishon Estate and was a playground at the time. A second proposal was made for a larger structure to be built, also on the Wishon property. It was designed in early 1939 by Thomas F. Chase, but was abandoned. A third plan, for a smaller $65,000 theater, was made about the week of April 16, 1939, for Redwood Theatres, Inc. William David was the architect for the proposed structure at North Van Ness and Olive, but the plans never materialized.

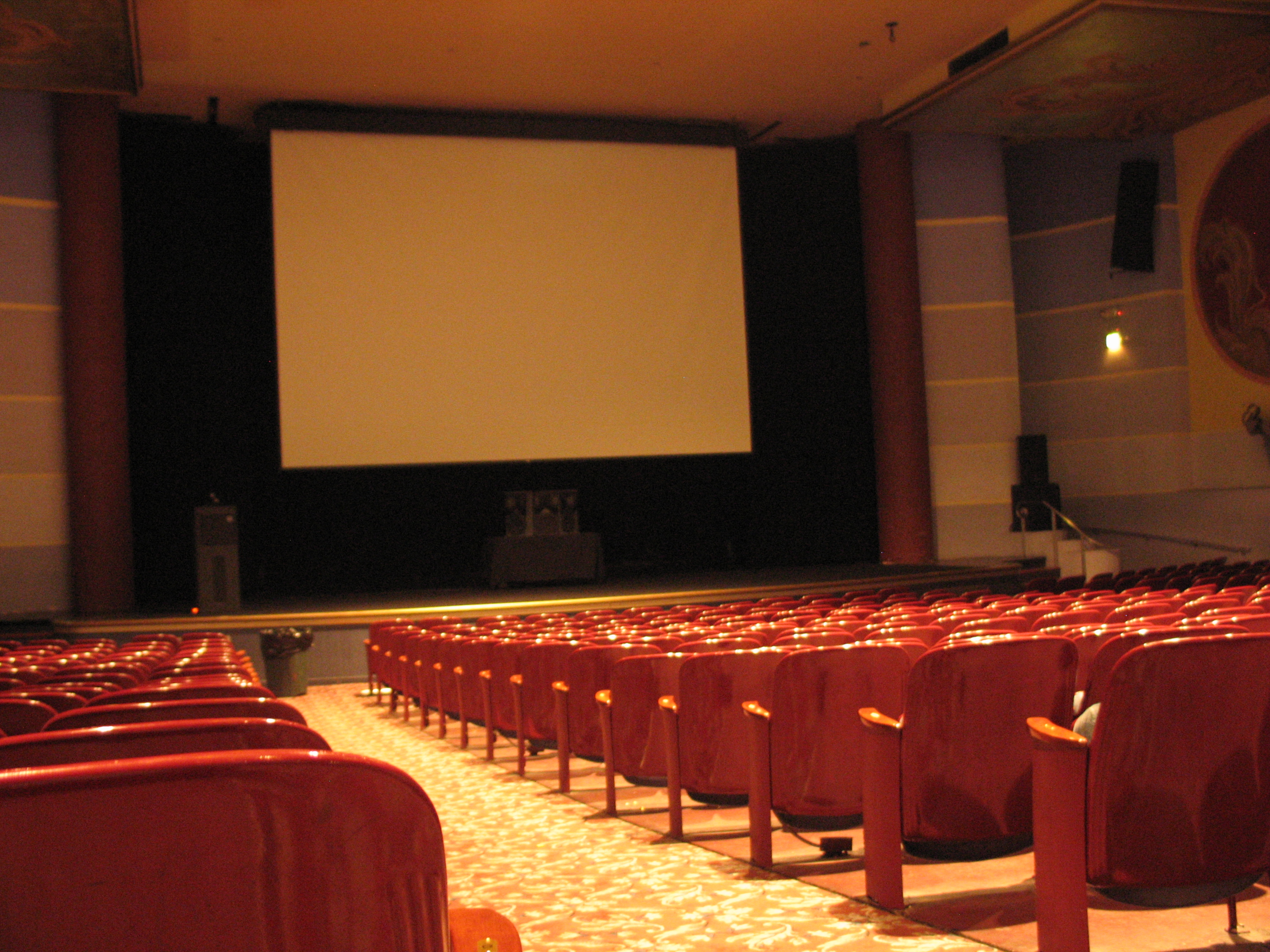
Theatre auditorium in 2007

Building permits were issued on May 11, 1939, by the city of Fresno for a Wishon/Fox theater. Codenamed "The Ritz", the design was significantly smaller than the original Wishon/Fox proposal. It was designed by S. Charles Lee and was estimated to cost $100,000. Construction began immediately following the issuing of permits under the direction of general contracting firm Trewhitt, Shields and Fisher. The original design for a finned tower was revised by Lee in August 1939. The new 80-foot (24 m) design resembled the 130-foot (40 m) "Star Pylon" at the 1939 New York World's Fair, designed by Francis Kelly and Leonard Dean to symbolize the "force of electricity". (Note: Photographs of the Star Pylon at 1939nyworldsfair.com) On December 14, 1939, the theater, formally dedicated as the "Tower Theatre", opened to a private party for local dignitaries and people associated with Fox Theaters with a premiere of the film Balalaika. It opened to the public the next day, featuring the films Dancing Co-Ed and Henry Goes Arizona. The theater was not certified as complete until January 29, 1940, but there was a push to occupy the building prior to Christmas 1939.

Following A. Emory Wishon's death in 1948, the theater property was sold to a Fox Theaters subsidiary by his estate. The theater was converted to CinemaScope in 1954, resulting in the removal of a false proscenium stage. The theater stopped showing first run films in 1980 and switched to a repertory cinema format. The theater later ran foreign films for several years until 1989 when it ceased operation. The theater was deeply in debt and running films was no longer economically viable. A Certified Historic Rehabilitation began on the property, renovating the theater and retail wings. Following the restoration, the theater reopened as the "Tower Theatre for the Performing Arts". The renovation earned awards from the California Preservation Foundation and the San Joaquin Chapter, American Institute of Architects.

The non-profit organization Fresno Filmworks has been showing first-run independent cinema at The Tower Theatre on the second Friday of each month since 2002. The theater also hosts the annual Fresno Film Festival.

=== Historic designations ===
The theater was added to the National Register of Historic Places on September 24, 1992. It was nominated under Criterion C for its local architectural significance within three contexts. It was built at the close of the Great Depression and during the peak popularity of the Streamline Moderne style. The theater was the only work completed by Lee in the city of Fresno, and is representative of his designs for suburban movie theaters. Lastly, it is one of only six extant vintage theaters in Fresno; the only one designed with an on-site parking lot and the only suburban facility. Its period of significance was given as 1939–1940, the construction and completion of the theater being the primary significant events in its history. No claim of significance under Criterion B was made, since its owners and developers were not singularly associated with the theater.

The theater is also listed on Fresno's Local Register of Historic Resources as property 190.

== Design and setting ==
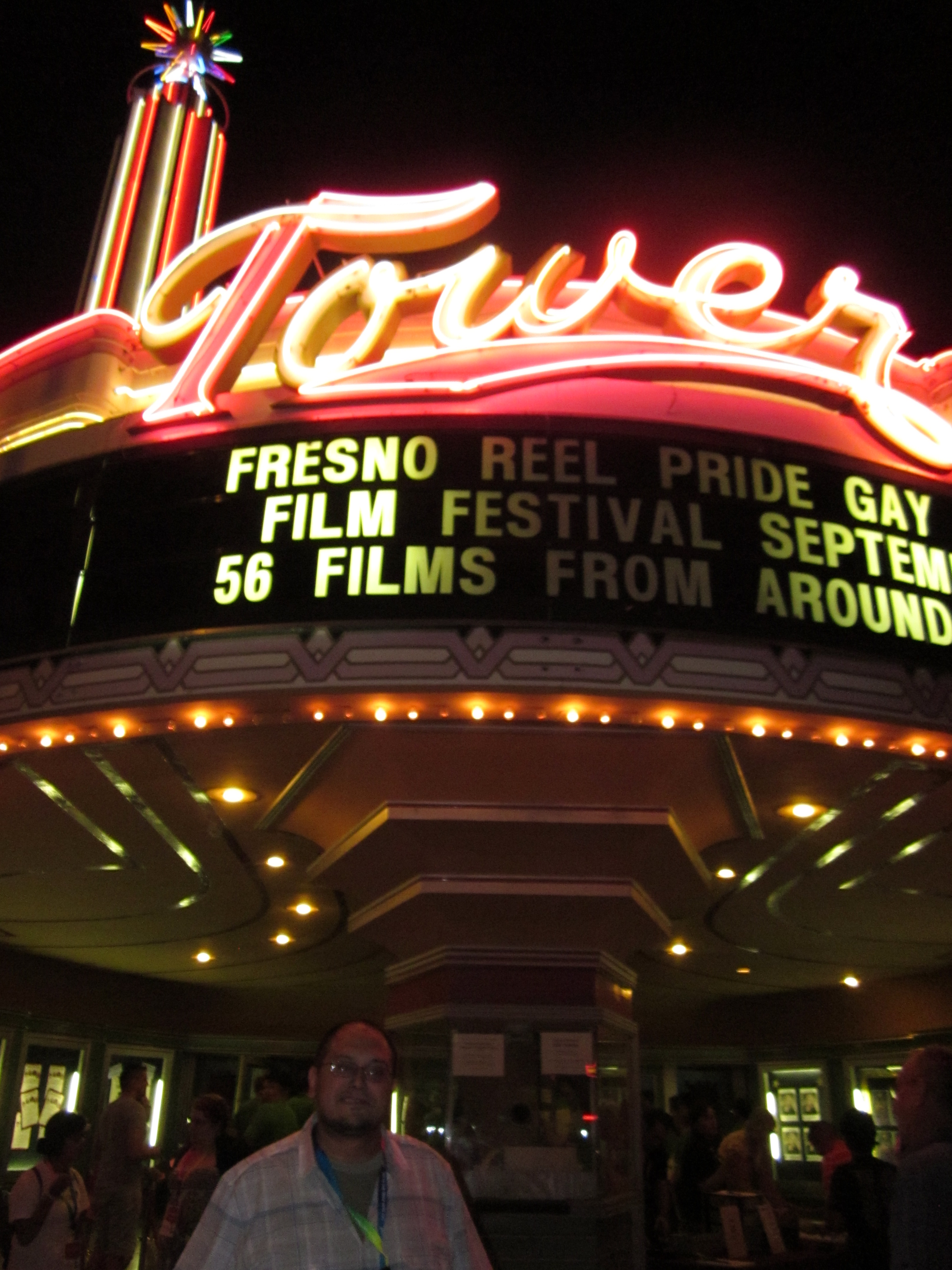
Theater entrance and neon lighting in 2011

The theater is located in a neighborhood eponymously named the "Tower District". It is located at the northwest corner of North Wishon and East Olive Avenues. The building occupies 20,000 square feet (1,900 m^{2}) of ground in an arrowhead shape. The auditorium, which forms the shaft of the arrow, is situated at a 45° angle to the streets and the two wings of the building contain retail space. The theater and parking lot originally covered a full 2.12-acre (0.86 ha) block. In 1964, a 0.29-acre (1,200 m^{2}) portion at the northeast corner was split off, leaving the theater property at 1.83 acres (0.74 ha). The separate parcel has been home to a service station and a restaurant. At the southwest corner is a non-contributing commercial building.

The building features an 80-foot (24 m) concrete tower fitted with neon tube lighting and capped by a pronged orb with neon lights. A cantilevered marquee wraps around the entrance, appearing to be supported by a hexagonal box office.

Tower Theatre was designed in the Streamline Moderne style. It is the only architectural work to have been completed by Lee in Fresno. Dutch-born muralist Anthony Heinsbergen created the "Leda and Swan" and "Vine" motifs for murals on the theater's ceiling and walls. The Tower Theatre was the second theater in the United States with fluorescent-painted murals illuminated by ultraviolet lights; the first experiments with such a setup were undertaken by Lee at his Academy Theatre in Inglewood, California. The theater features a centrally located bas-relief etched-glass panel, a near-replica of Gaetano Cecere's 1927 "The Huntsman".

== See also ==
- National Register of Historic Places listings in Fresno County, California
