= Cheney Block =

Historic building in Los Angeles, US

- U.S. Historic district – Contributing property
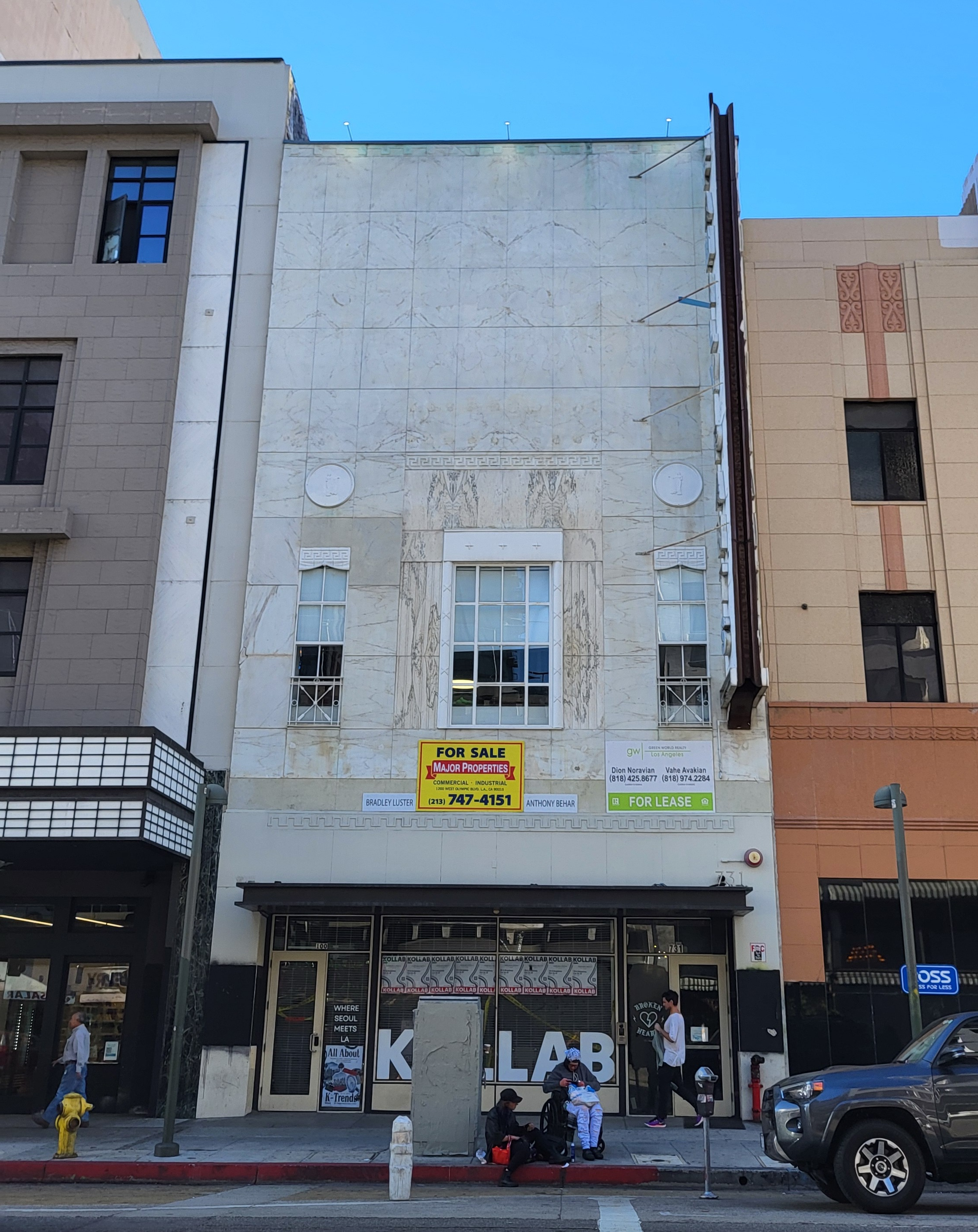
- The building in 2025

- Location within the Los Angeles metropolitan area
- Location: 731-733 S. Broadway, Los Angeles, California
- Coordinates: 34°02′41″N 118°15′16″W
- Built: 1913, 1940s
- Architect: S. Charles Lee (1940s)
- Part of: Broadway Theater and Commercial District (ID79000484)
- Designated CP: May 9, 1979

Cheney Block is a historic four-story building located at 731-733 S. Broadway in the Jewelry District and Broadway Theater District in the historic core of downtown Los Angeles. It is a contributing property in the Broadway Theater and Commercial District.

== History ==
Cheney Block was built in 1913 and its facade was remodeled in by S. Charles Lee in the 1940s. The building was designed for retail and has had numerous occupants over the years, including an ice cream shop in 1913, a restaurant in 1927, College Boot Shop in 1928, Steven's Shops Inc. in 1936, Leed's shoe store in 1942, and numerous others.

In 1979, the Broadway Theater and Commercial District was added to the National Register of Historic Places, with Cheney Block listed as a contributing property in the district.

The building was restored in 2021.

== Architecture and design ==
Cheney Block is made of brick and concrete.

== See also ==
- List of contributing properties in the Broadway Theater and Commercial District
