= Vine Theatre =

Movie theater in Hollywood, Los Angeles

- Dolby @ Vine; Dolby Screening Room Hollywood Vine
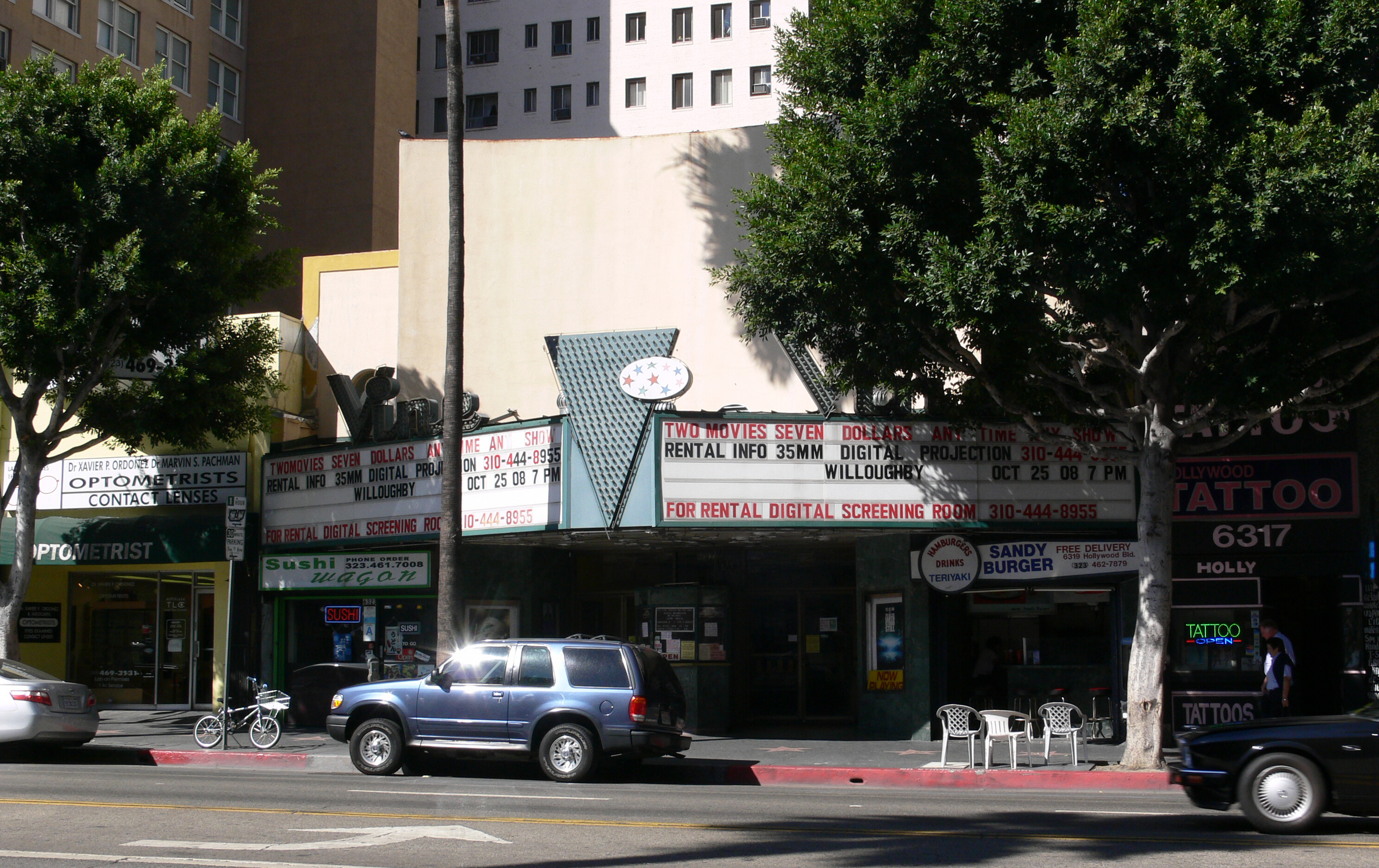
- The theater in 2008
- Interactive map of Vine Theatre
- Former names: Admiral Theater (1940–1960s); Rector’s Admiral Theatre (1960s–1969)
- Address: 6321 Hollywood Boulevard, Hollywood, California
- Coordinates: 34.102°N 118.327°W
- Owner: Dolby Laboratories, Inc.
- Capacity: formerly 675, currently 70
- Type: Indoor movie theater

Construction
- Built: 1923
- Opened: May 16, 1940
- Renovated: 1940, 1969, 1970s, 2009, 2014
- Years active: 1940-2007, 2009, 2015-present
- Architects: S. Charles Lee and others

Vine Theatre, formerly Admiral Theatre and Rector’s Admiral Theatre, also known as Vine Street Theatre, Dolby @ Vine, and Dolby Screening Room Hollywood Vine, is a historic movie theater located at 6321 W. Hollywood Boulevard, near the intersection of Hollywood and Vine, in Hollywood, California.

== History ==
The building that would become Vine Theatre was originally built as a restaurant, called "Henry's" in 1923, by a Chaplin-connected comedian named Henry Bergman. Charlie Chaplin set up Bergman in the restaurant, which failed in 1932 due to Bergman falling ill. Julius Stern and his brother Abe Stern purchased the building from the bank in 1933 for $35,000 and ultimately remodeled the property to a theater, with a $60,000 investment. Architect S. Charles Lee oversaw the conversion to a 675-seat movie theater named Admiral Theatre, for Stern Brothers Realty Co., which opened on May 16, 1940. Its first screening was Danielle Darrieux and John Loder's His Majesty’s Mistress and H.B. Warner's Torpedoed.

The theater changed its name to Rector’s Admiral Theatre in the 1960s, then to Vine Theatre after a $200,000 ($1.76 million in 2025) remodel in 1969. Pre remodel, the theatre played mostly revivals and sub-runs.

Pacific Theatres acquired Vine Theatre in the 1970s, at which point the theater underwent another remodel and was operated as a Spanish language theater and a two-dollar grindhouse.

In 1985, the Hollywood Boulevard Commercial and Entertainment District was added to the National Register of Historic Places, with Vine Theatre (named Vine Street Theater in the listing) listed in the district. The listing notes the theater's 1950s facade and triangular marquee, but ultimately concluded it did not contribute to the character of the district.

Julius Stern and his descendants owned the building and leased it to its various tenants until 1992.

By the mid-2000s, Vine Theatre was an independent operation showing seven-dollar double features, and it closed as a movie theater in October 2007.

The building was then variously used for church services, private screenings, and location shooting. In 2009, it became a Lazerium, which closed in December 2009.

In May 2015, the theater reopened as a 70-seat Dolby showcase theater, known as Dolby @ Vine or Dolby Screening Room Hollywood Vine.
