= Star Theatre (La Puente, California) =

Former movie theater in La Puente, California

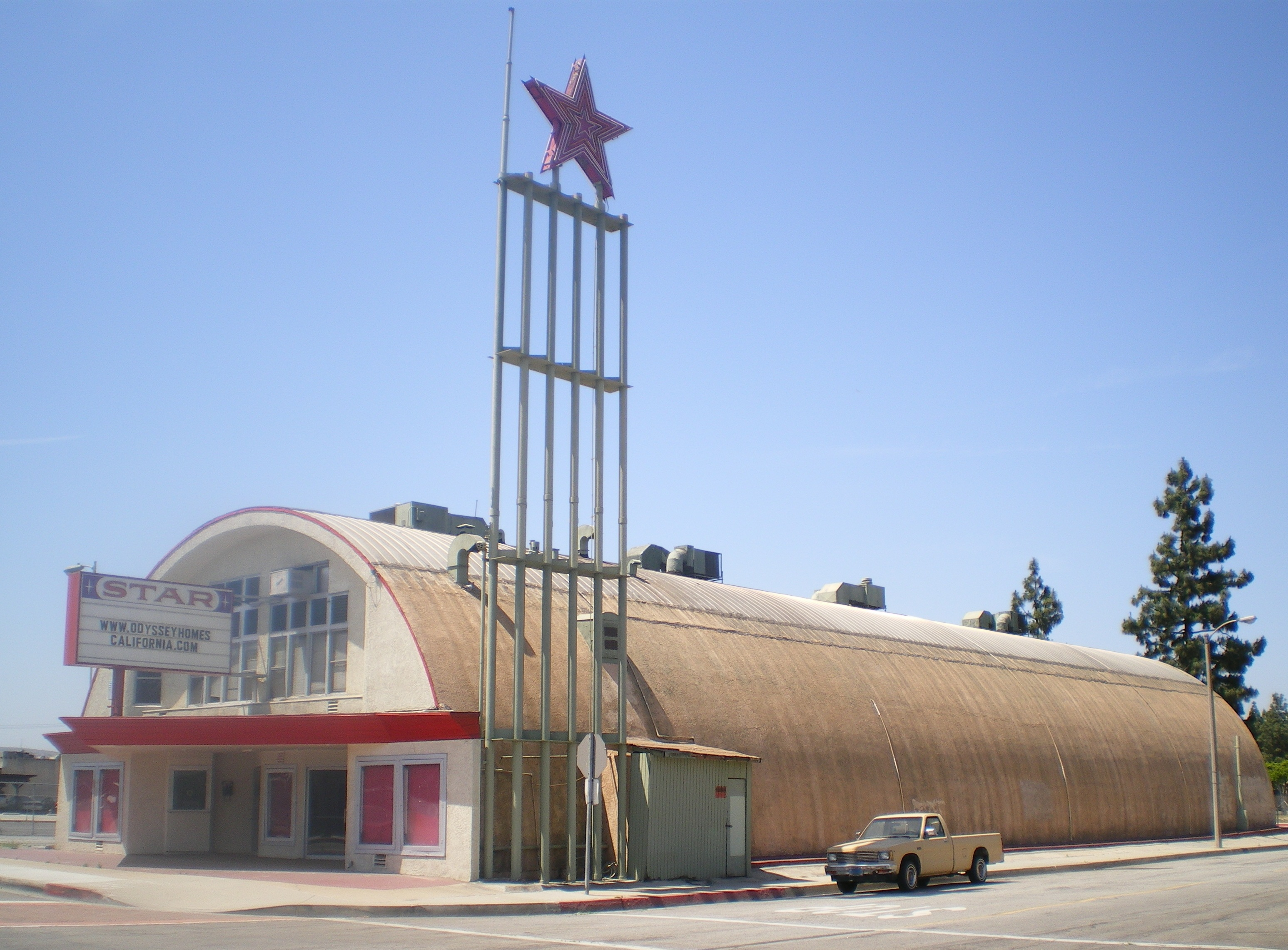
- The building in 2008
- Interactive map of Star Theatre
- Address: 145 North 1st Street, La Puente, California
- Coordinates: 34.0217°N 117.9530°W
- Type: Movie theater

Construction
- Built: 1947-1948
- Opened: 1948, 2004
- Closed: 2000, 2007
- Demolished: 2019
- Architect: S. Charles Lee

Star Theatre, formerly Puente Theatre, was a historic movie theater located at 145 North 1st Street in La Puente, California.

== History ==
Star Theatre, originally Puente Theatre, was designed by S. Charles Lee and built in 1947–1948, making it one of Lee's few postwar works. It opened in 1948 and ran first run movies from its opening to the 1970s, after which it screened pornography into the early 1990s. The theater lost its adult entertainment license in 2000, then reopened in 2004, screening mainstream movies with Spanish subtitles and also hosting live Spanish-language music performances. The theater closed again in 2007.

The theater had been threatened with demolition since at least 2006. In 2016, Linda Young bought the property for $1.12 million ($1.5 million in 2025), at which point the building was vacant and the lot surrounded by chain link fencing. In April 2019, La Puente city council unanimously approved replacing the theater with a 22-unit condominium complex. The theater was demolished the following June. The theater's iconic star, however, was saved by city and the Los Angeles Historic Theatre Foundation.

== Architecture and design ==
Star Theatre was a lamella construction, this despite lamella being more typical of grocery stores and auto showrooms than theaters at the time. Lamella, which utilizes short lengths of lumber to create diamond-shaped bracing on an arched structure, allowed Lee to design the theater without steel and with minimal columns and trusses. Lee designed five theaters using this technique; however, Star Theatre was the only one to incorporate the arch shape in the building's facade. It did so through the design of its roof, which was half-cylinder in shape and resulted in the building resembling a Quonset hut. Inside, the auditorium's lower curved walls were plastered over; however, the diamond-shaped lamella pattern was left exposed to form the ceiling. The building also featured aluminum-framed windows and entry doors.

A second defining aspect of Star Theatre's design was its signage, which was freestanding and rose to twice the height of the theater. The sign structure was made of five alternating pairs of poles, each one slim, made of metal, and evenly braced by horizontal members. The result was a striking and unusual grid-like appearance. Atop the structure was a flagpole and a large neon-illuminated star.
