= Academy Theatre (Inglewood, California) =

Former movie theater in Inglewood, California

- Interactive map of Academy Theatre
- Address: 3141 West Manchester Boulevard, Inglewood, California
- Coordinates: 33.961°N 118.327°W
- Capacity: 1,156
- Type: Movie theater

Construction
- Opened: November 7, 1939
- Closed: 1976
- Architect: S. Charles Lee

Academy Theatre was a historic movie theater located at 3141 West Manchester Boulevard in Inglewood, California. Opened in 1939, the building was converted to a church in 1976.

== History ==
Academy Theatre was designed by S. Charles Lee, an architect known for numerous theaters throughout southern California. This theater, owned by Fox West Coast Theaters, opened on November 7, 1939, sat 1,156, and cost $200,000 ($4.63 million in 2025) to construct.

Academy Theatre was meant to house Academy Award ceremonies, although it never did. It did however become a popular location for Hollywood premieres and its opening night screening was the press preview of Another Thin Man with stars William Powell, Myrna Loy, studio executive Louis B. Mayer, and Fox West Coast Theaters president Charles Skouras hosting the event. 1,100 members of the press and film industry attended the opening, as did 4,000+ fans seated on bleachers outside the theater. The opening was also broadcast over the radio, an unheard of event at the time.

By the 1960s, the theater had lost its luster, due mainly to changes to the neighborhood and competition from other theaters throughout the Los Angeles area. This theater closed in 1976, at which point the building was converted to a church.

== Architecture and design ==
Academy Theatre, inspired by the front grille of Chrysler automobiles, has been described as "a landmark in Streamline Moderne design" and "a high point of the Streamline Moderne in the United States." The building features circular forms, glass block, and a 125-foot (38 m) pencil-like neon naming spire circled by a helical light and topped by a sunburst, the spire the tallest in the country when it was built. The theater's ticket booth featured slick, rounded corners.

Inside, the lobby was large, unbroken, curved, and featured a large Academy Award-themed mural sandblasted into glass. The theater itself featured curved lines of movement, making the space feel whimsical and lilting rather than forceful, and was meant to "have the feel that only the church had given before."
