= Mailing's Building =

Building in Los Angeles, California

- Mailing's
- U.S. Historic district – Contributing property
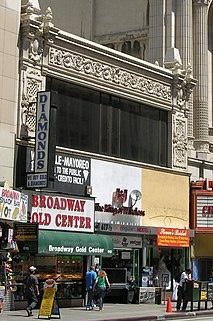
- The building in 2006

- Location within the Los Angeles metropolitan area
- Location: 617-619 S. Broadway, Los Angeles, California
- Coordinates: 34°02′47″N 118°15′10″W
- Built: 1930
- Architect: S. Charles Lee
- Architectural style: French Renaissance
- Part of: Broadway Theater and Commercial District (ID79000484)
- Designated CP: May 9, 1979

Mailing's is a historic two-story building located at 617-619 S. Broadway in the Broadway Theater District in the Jewelry District and historic core of downtown Los Angeles.

== History ==
Mailing's was built in 1930 and designed by S. Charles Lee, the same architect who designed the Los Angeles Theatre that this building shares its northern wall with. In 1979, when the Broadway Theater and Commercial District was added to the National Register of Historic Places, both Mailing's and Los Angeles Theater were listed as separate contributing properties in the district.

== Architecture and design ==
The Mailing's building is made of concrete and features a French Renaissance design.

== See also ==
- List of contributing properties in the Broadway Theater and Commercial District
