= Hollywood & Western Building =

Building in Los Angeles, California, U.S.

- Hollywood Western Building
- U.S. National Register of Historic Places
- Los Angeles Historic-Cultural Monument
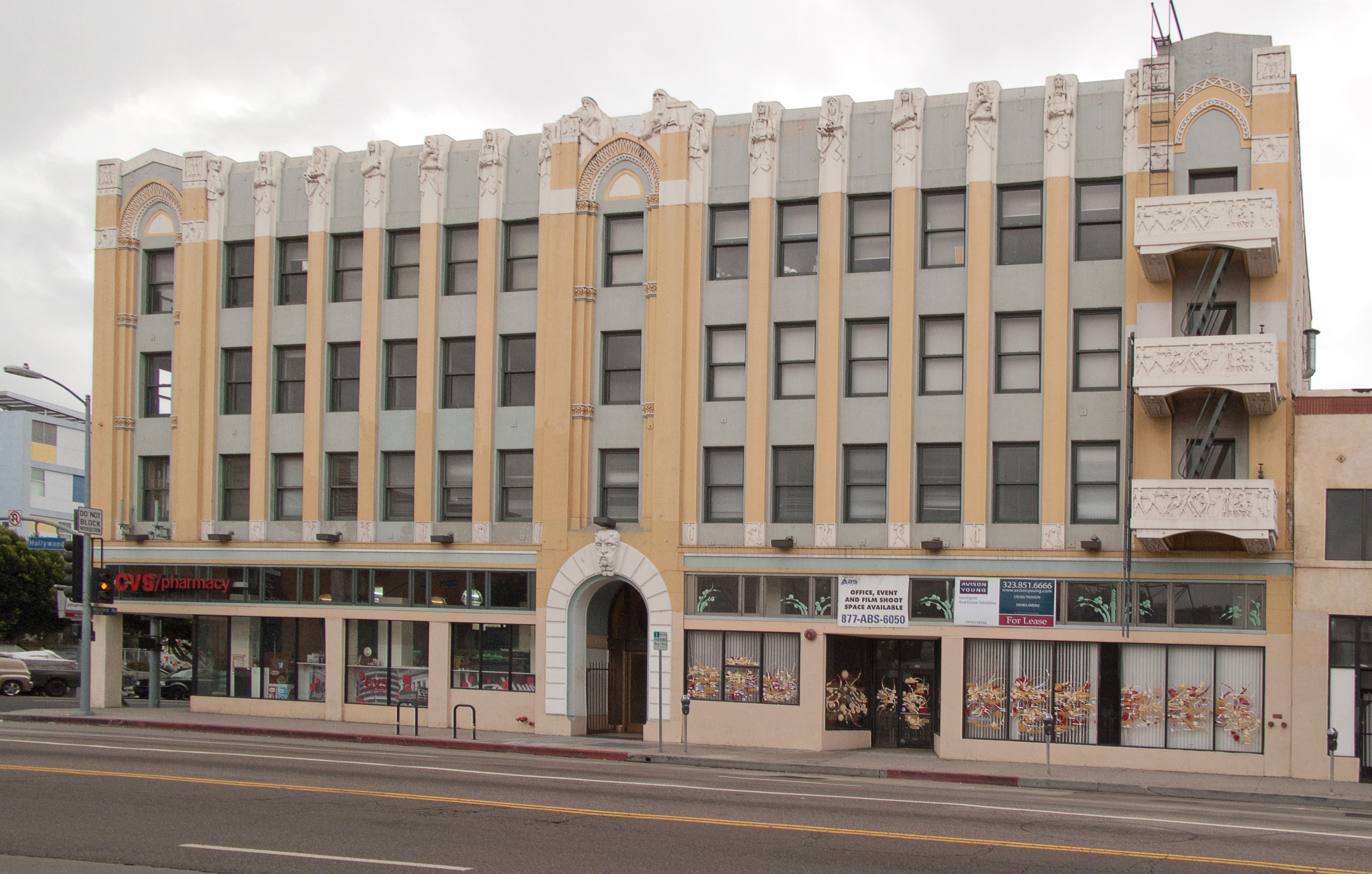
- Hollywood & Western Building, 2012

- Location within the Los Angeles metropolitan area Location within California Location within the United States
- Location: 5504 Hollywood Boulevard, Hollywood, CA, USA
- Coordinates: 34.10118°N 118.309751°W
- Built: 1928
- Architect: S. Charles Lee
- Architectural style: Art Deco
- NRHP reference No.: 15000378
- LAHCM No.: 336

Significant dates
- Added to NRHP: July 7, 2015
- Designated LAHCM: January 1, 1988

The Hollywood & Western Building, also known as The Mayer Building, and formerly known as the "Hollywood Western Building", is a four-story Art Deco office building in Hollywood, Los Angeles, California. It was designated Los Angeles Historic-Cultural Monument #336 on January 1, 1988, and was listed on the National Register of Historic Places in 2015.

== History ==
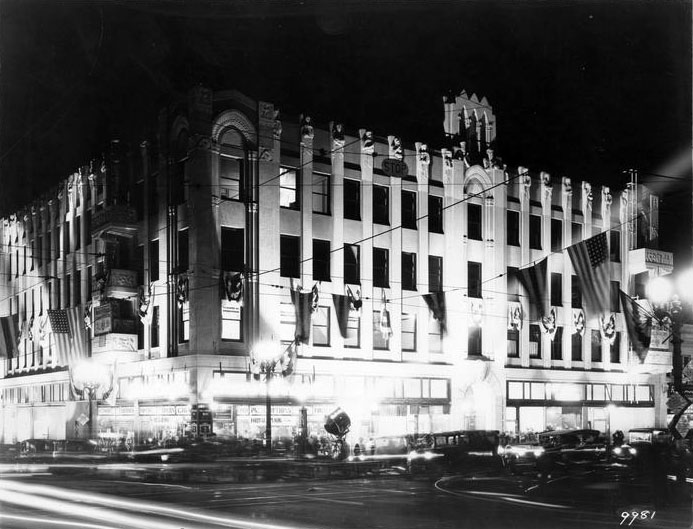
The building in 1928

Designed by S. Charles Lee and built by Louis B. Mayer and Irving Thalberg, the Hollywood & Western Building opened on December 8, 1928. The building was the first location of Motion Picture Association of America, the Hays Office, and The Ben Hecht Company. On January 25, 1926, Central Casting officially opened its office in the Hollywood & Western Building. Hollywood Billiards, Hollywood's oldest pool hall, was located in the lower basement. Over the years its tenants have also included Toppy's (a corner coffee shop), Newman Drug Co., Rexall, Bargain Saver, Hollywood Rehearsal Studios, Studio 9, Rock City Arcade, and Cosmopolitan Book Depository.

By the 1970s, the building was being used to produce pornography and was slowly converted into individual recording studios and music rehearsal spaces. It was also used as a rehearsal studio for such bands as Guns N' Roses and White Zombie.

The building was heavily damaged in the 1994 Northridge earthquake, after which it was vacant for several years. Previous tenants included local offices for U.S. Representative Adam Schiff.

On July 6, 2021, ABS Properties, Inc. announced plans to convert the building into 79 income-restricted apartments,

== In popular culture ==
The building is a popular TV and film shoot location, and was featured in Double Indemnity, Ruthless People, and Hollywood Shuffle.
