= Central Casting =

American casting company

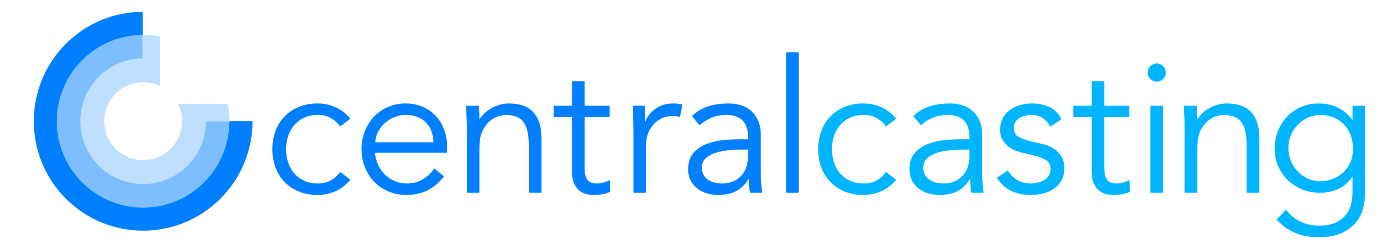
- Industry: Entertainment
- Founded: December 4, 1925; 100 years ago
- Founder: Will H. Hays
- Headquarters: Burbank, California, United States
- Number of locations: 4
- Services: Casting

Central Casting is an American casting company that specializes in the casting of extras, body doubles, and stand-ins. It was founded in Los Angeles in 1925, with additional offices opening in New York City, New Orleans, and Atlanta in the 21st century.

In popular usage, a person may be said to be "straight out of central casting" if their demeanor is felt to be stereotypical in nature, typically for their vocation or other attributes.

== History ==
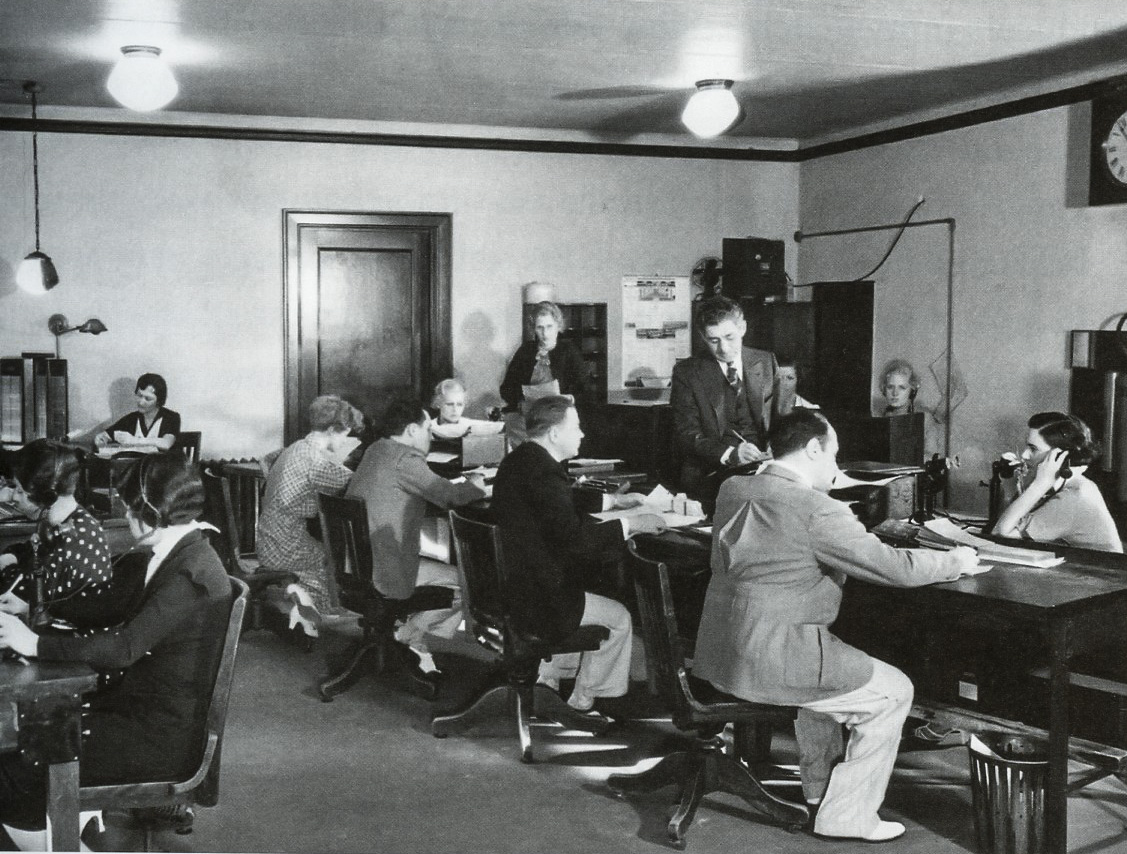
Inside the original Central Casting office in the Hollywood & Western Building (1929)

=== Los Angeles ===
When the entertainment industry started to take off in the early 1920s, thousands of people flocked to Hollywood with hopes of becoming the next big star. These hopefuls were called "extras" because they were the extra people who filled out scenes. The main way to find work at this time was to wait outside the gates of studios, hoping to be hired on the spot. With little regulation on hiring film extras, many people were exploited while looking for work.

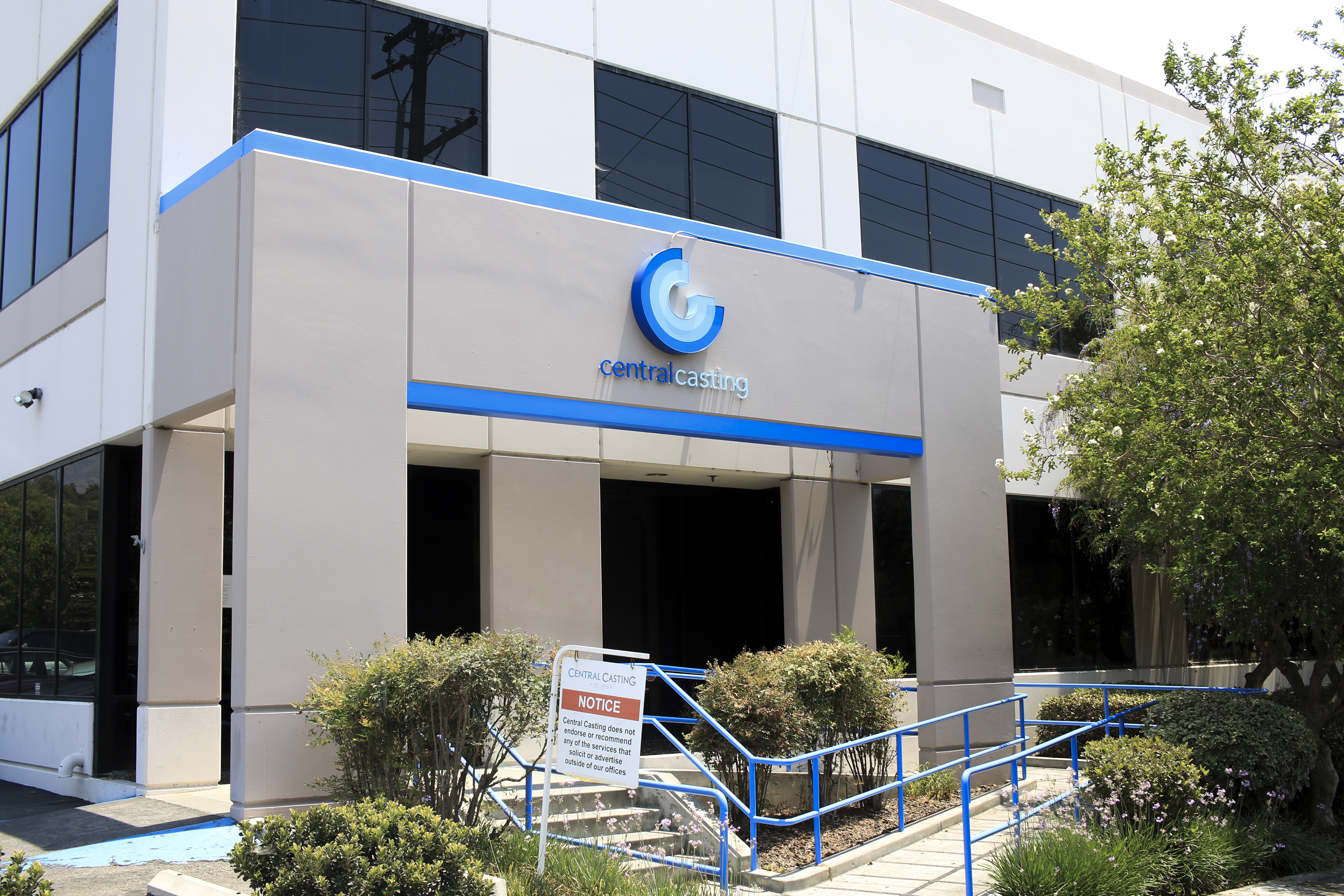
Central Casting Los Angeles in Burbank, California (2017)

In an effort to fix the employment issues and exploitation that plagued the industry, Will H. Hays commissioned several studies of the employment conditions in Hollywood, including one from Mary van Kleeck, a prominent sociologist with the Russell Sage Foundation. After reviewing the results of the studies, Hays adopted a suggestion of van Kleeck's and created the Central Casting Corporation in 1925 as a way to regulate the hiring of extras in Hollywood. Central Casting was formally established on December 4, 1925, as the Central Casting Bureau by Hays and the Motion Picture Producers and Distributors of America (MPPDA).

Hays had four main goals for Central Casting: to do away with the high fees for extras that were charged by private employment agencies, to ensure extras were paid legally, to discourage the influx of people flocking to Hollywood to seek employment as extras, and to provide steady employment to qualified extras.

To carry out his vision, Hays hired Fred Beetson as president, and on January 25, 1926, Central Casting officially opened its office in the Hollywood & Western Building in Hollywood.

For the estimated 30,000 aspiring extras in Hollywood, Central Casting became the only source of extra work. In the first six months of operation, the agency registered more than 18,000 extras and made 113,873 placements. Many Hollywood legends started their careers with Central Casting, including Clark Gable, Jean Harlow, and Gary Cooper.

In 1944, the agency introduced a second phone line, GArfield 3621 for men and GArfield 3711 for women. Though registration decreased due to World War II, the switchboard often received up to 4,000 calls an hour from extras looking for work.

In 1976, the Motion Picture Association of America (the former MPPDA) sold Central Casting to Production Payment, Inc., a subsidiary of Talent & Residuals, making the agency privately owned for the first time.

When the agency's parent company International Digitronics Corporation merged with Draney Information Services Corporation in 1991, Central Casting merged with Richmar Casting to become part of the newly formed Entertainment Partners. During this process, Central Casting overhauled their digital casting system, making it easier for casting directors to search through their 15,000 registered extras. Around this time, extras begin to refer to themselves as background actors.

=== New York ===
In April 2006, Central Casting New York opened in Manhattan. Some early projects cast by the New York office included Law & Order and Spider-Man 2.

In April 2018, the office moved to its new location on the 10th floor of 5 Pennsylvania Plaza.

=== Louisiana ===
After casting thousands of background actors for Jurassic World, Central Casting Louisiana opened an office in Benson Tower in New Orleans on September 23, 2014. The office's first television casting project was The Astronauts Wives Club.

=== Georgia ===
In 2016, Central Casting Georgia opened in Atlanta after the on-location background casting for American Made.
