= S. Charles Lee =

American architect (1899–1990)

- Born: September 5, 1899; Chicago, Illinois
- Died: January 27, 1990 (aged 90); Los Angeles, California, United States
- Education: Armour Institute of Technology
- Occupation: Architect

Simeon Charles Lee (né Levi; September 5, 1899 – January 27, 1990) was an American architect recognized as one of the most prolific and distinguished motion picture theater designers on the West Coast.

== Life ==
=== Early life ===
Simeon Charles Levi was born in Chicago in 1899 to American-born parents of German-Jewish ancestry, Julius and Hattie (Stiller) Levi. He grew up going to vaudeville theatres, nickelodeons, and early movie houses. A tinkerer interested in mechanical things, Lee built three motorcars as a teenager. His interest in mechanics led him to Lake Technical High School in Chicago, where he graduated in 1916.

=== Education ===
While in high school in 1915, he worked after school in the office of Chicago architect Henry Newhouse, a family friend who specialized in theater design: small motion picture houses, nickelodeons and remodeling storefronts into theaters. Lee attended Chicago Technical College, graduating with honors in 1918. His first job was as architect for the South Park Board of the City of Chicago. During World War I he enlisted in the Navy. After his discharge in 1920, he entered the Armour Institute of Technology to study architecture, where he was exposed to the principles of the École des Beaux-Arts which are reflected in his later work.

While in Chicago, Lee worked for Rapp & Rapp, a highly regarded Chicago architectural firm well known for movie theater design. Lee was also influenced by Louis Sullivan's lectures in his architecture classes and Frank Lloyd Wright's work, particularly Midway Gardens and Wright's Oak Park studio. Lee was also impressed by the 1922 Chicago Tribune Tower competition, which juxtaposed historicism with modernism. Lee considered himself a modernist, and his career revealed "both the Beaux Arts discipline and emphasis on planning and the modernist functionalism and freedom of form."

=== Career ===
In 1922, Lee moved to Los Angeles. His first major movie palace was the Tower Theatre, a Spanish-Romanesque-Moorish design that launched a career that would make Lee the principal designer of motion picture theaters in Los Angeles during the 1930s and 1940s. He is credited with designing over 400 theaters throughout California and Mexico. His palatial and Baroque Los Angeles Theatre (1931) is regarded by many architectural historians as the finest theater building in Los Angeles.

Lee was an early proponent of Art Deco and Moderne style theaters, including Fresno's Tower Theatre. The Bruin Theater (1937) and Academy Theatre (1939) are among his most characteristic. The latter, located in Inglewood, California, is a prime example of Lee's successful response to the automobile. After World War II, Lee recognized that the grand theater building had become a thing of the past, and began to focus on new technologies in industrial architecture. His work in the field of tilt-up building systems was published in Architectural Record in 1952.

== List of buildings ==
=== Theaters ===
==== Los Angeles ====
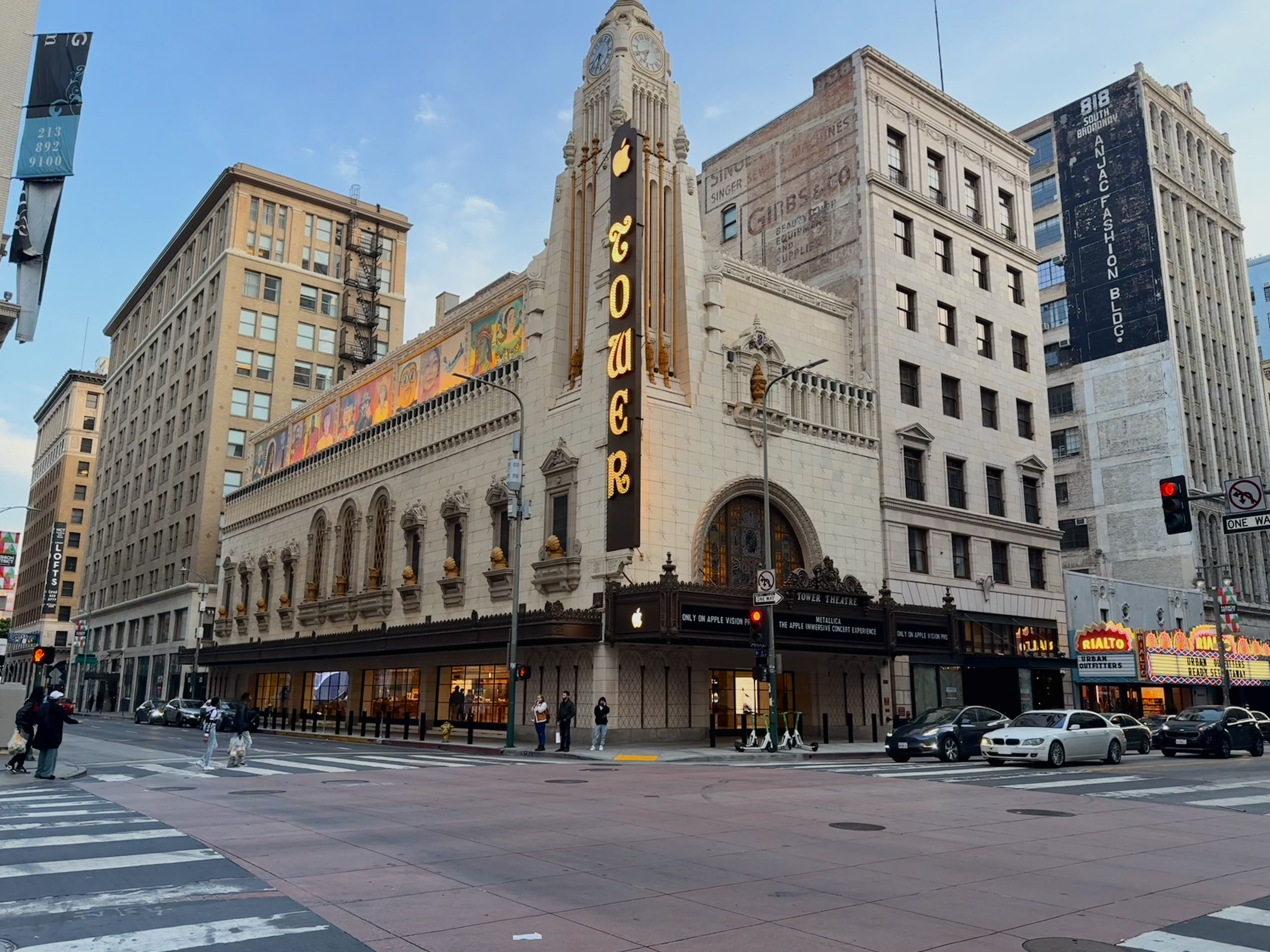
Tower Theatre (Los Angeles)

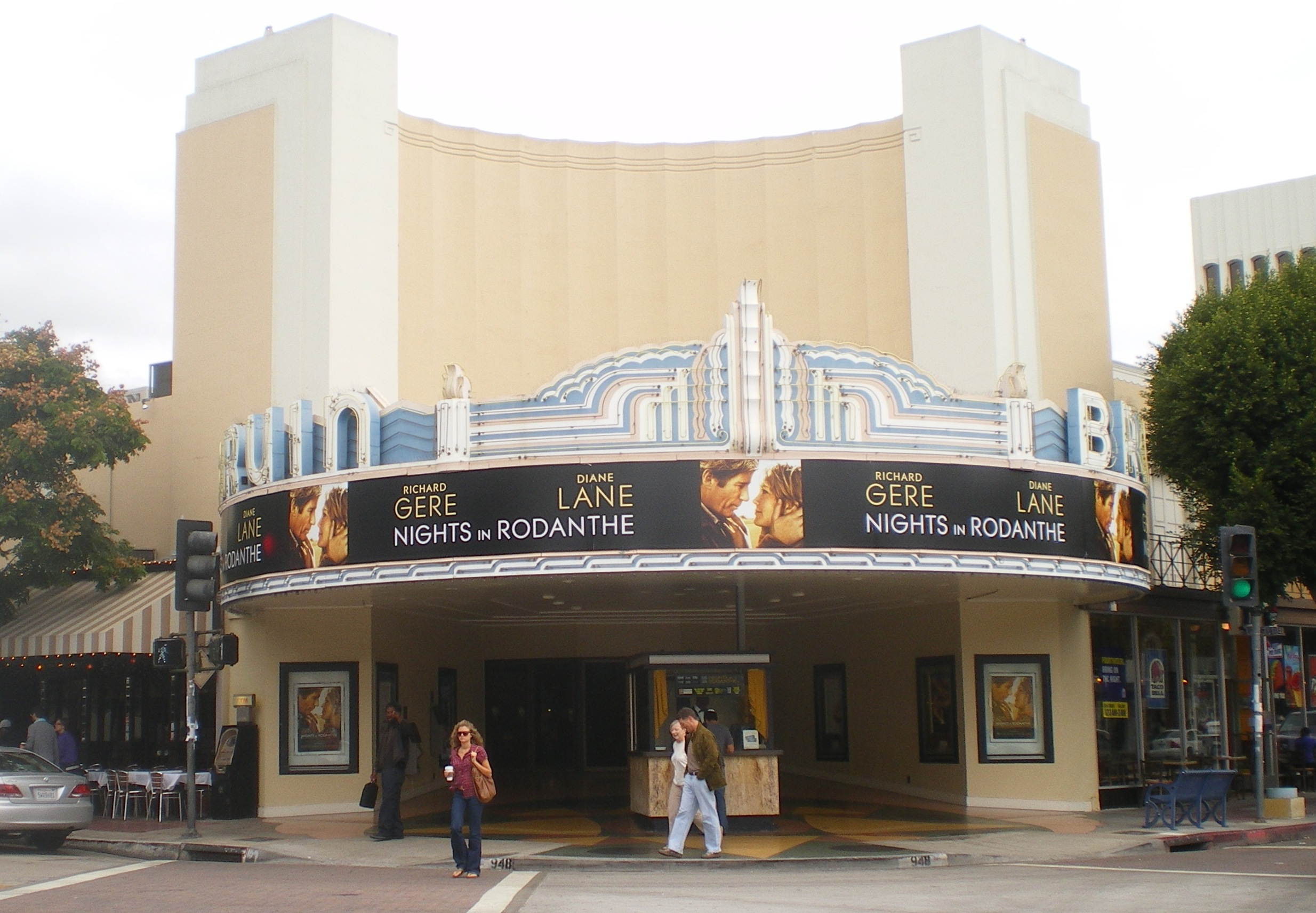
Bruin Theater

- Tower (1927), NRHP No. 79000484 CP, LAHCM No. 450
- Holly Cinema (1931 and 1935 remodels), NRHP No. 85000704 CP
- Follies (1930 remodel)
- Los Angeles (1931), NRHP No. 79000484 CP, LAHCM No. 225
- Florence (1932)
- Iris (1934 remodel)
- Vogue (1935)
- Westlake (1935 remodel)
- Hollywood (1936 remodel), NRHP No. 85000704 CP
- Bruin (1937), LAHCM No. 361
- La Reina (1938), LAHCM No. 290
- Vern (1939)
- Vine (1940 remodel)
- Reseda (1947 remodel)
- Bay Twin (1948)

==== Greater Los Angeles ====
- West Coast, Long Beach (1925)
- Fox Redondo, Redondo Beach (1928)
- Fox Wilshire, Beverly Hills (1930)
- Fox (Alpha), Bell (1938)
- Academy, Inglewood (1939)
- De Anza, Riverside (1939)
- Alex Theatre tower, Glendale (1940)
- Star, La Puente (1948)
- Fox Inglewood (1949)

==== Elsewhere in California ====
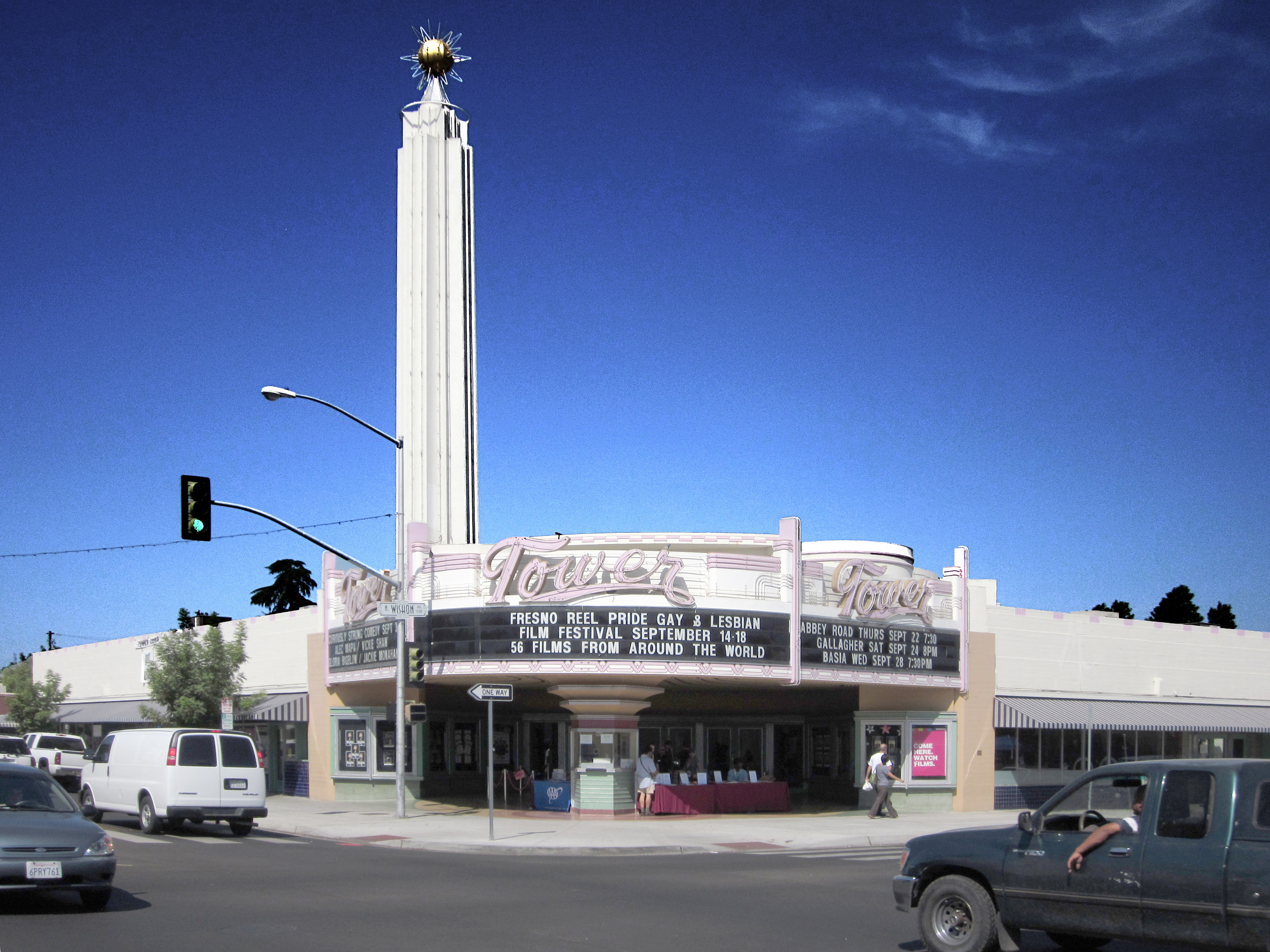
Tower Theatre (Fresno)

- Bakersfield Opera House (1927 remodel)
- Fox Bakersfield (1930)
- Tower, Fresno (1939), NRHP No. 92001276
- Berkeley Theatre (1930s remodel)
- Grand, San Francisco – collaborating architect (1940)
- State, San Diego (1940)
- Mayfair, Ventura (1940)
- Fremont, San Luis Obispo (1942)

==== Elsewhere ====
- Fox Phoenix, Arizona (1931)
- Tower, Klamath Falls, Oregon (1939)
- Huntridge, Las Vegas, Nevada (1944), NRHP No. 93000686
- Miami Theatre, Florida (1947)

=== Other ===
==== Los Angeles ====
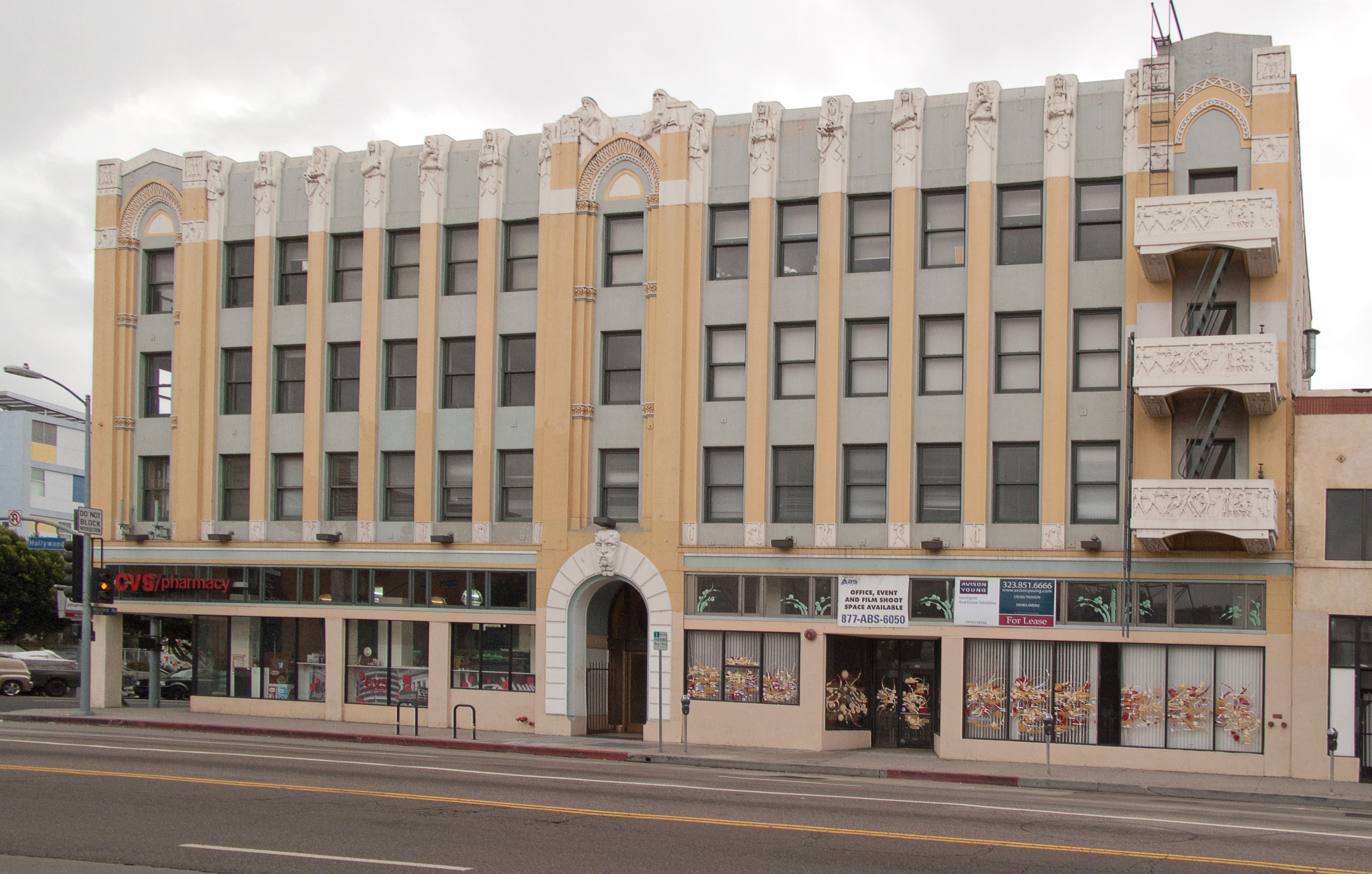
Hollywood & Western Building

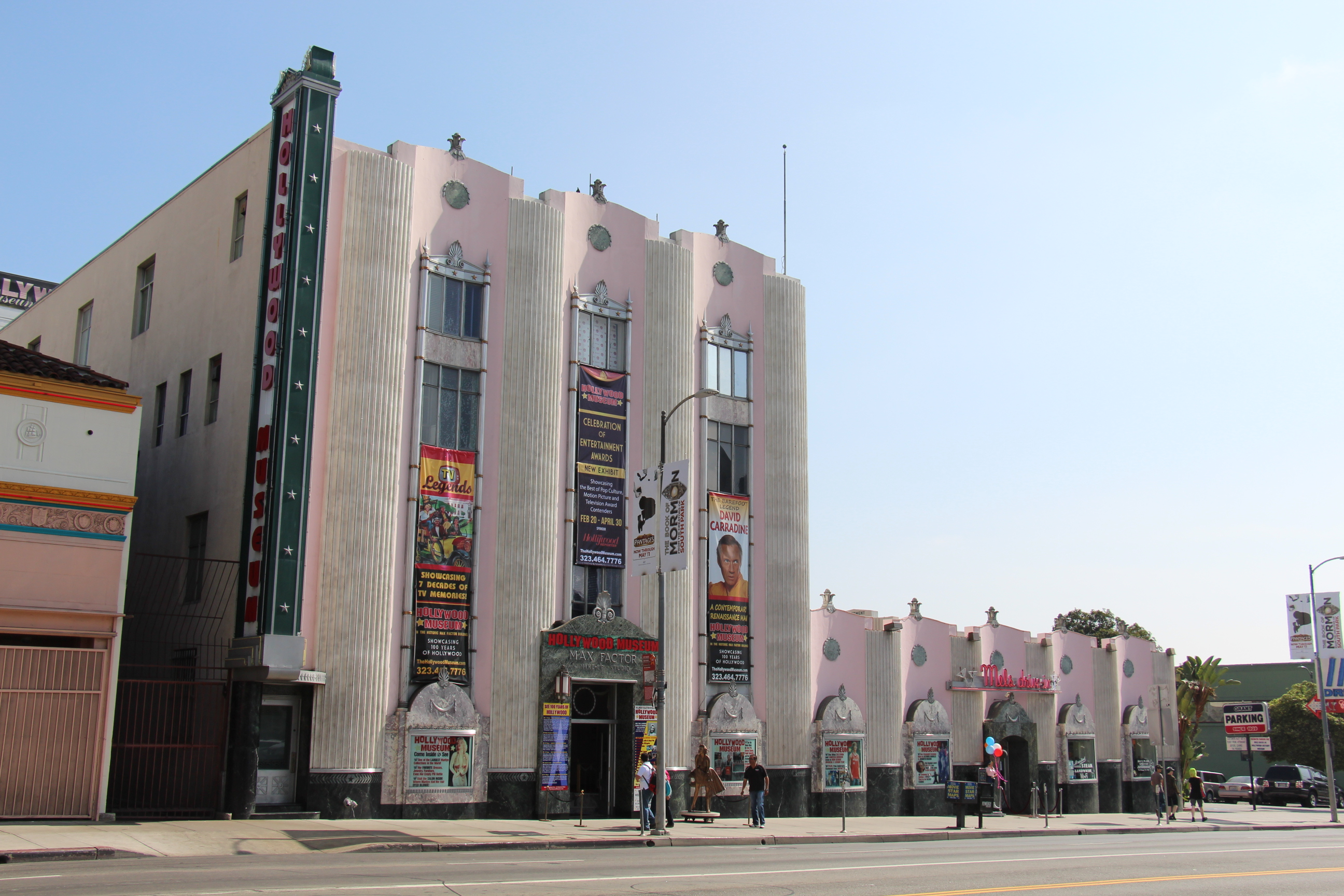
Max Factor Salon

- Hollywood Melrose Hotel (1927), NRHP No. 92000834
- Hollywood & Western Building (1928), NRHP No. 15000378, LAHCM No. 336
- Mailing's (1930), NRHP No. 79000484 CP
- Leed's (1935), NRHP No. 85000704 CP
- Max Factor Salon (1935), NRHP No. 85000704 CP, LAHCM No. 593
- Department of Water and Power Building (1939), LAHCM No. 232
- Cheney Block (1940s remodel), NRHP No. 79000484 CP
- Temple Israel of Hollywood (1948)

==== Elsewhere in California ====
- La Puente Valley Woman's Club, La Puente (1923), NRHP No. 99000482
- El Mirador Apartment, West Hollywood (1929)

== Honors and awards ==
Lee's work on the Los Angeles's Tower Theatre was featured in Architect & Engineer in 1928. Likewise, his work on Temple Israel of Hollywood was featured in Architectural Record in 1946.

Lee was honored by the Royal Institute of British Architects at the International Exhibition of Contemporary Architecture for his work on Fox Florence Theatre in 1934.

Lee received the highest recognition of the Society of Registered Architects, the Synergy Award, in 1975.

The UCLA Graduate School of Architecture and Urban Planning established an endowed chair honoring Lee in 1986.

== In popular culture ==
In 2026, artist Todd Gray dedicated the art piece that the LA Metro commissioned for the Wilshire/La Cienega station to Lee, using his blueprints to form the basis of a public art work at the entrance to the station.

== See also ==
- List of American architects
- List of people from Los Angeles
