= Bruin Theater =

Fox Bruin Theater
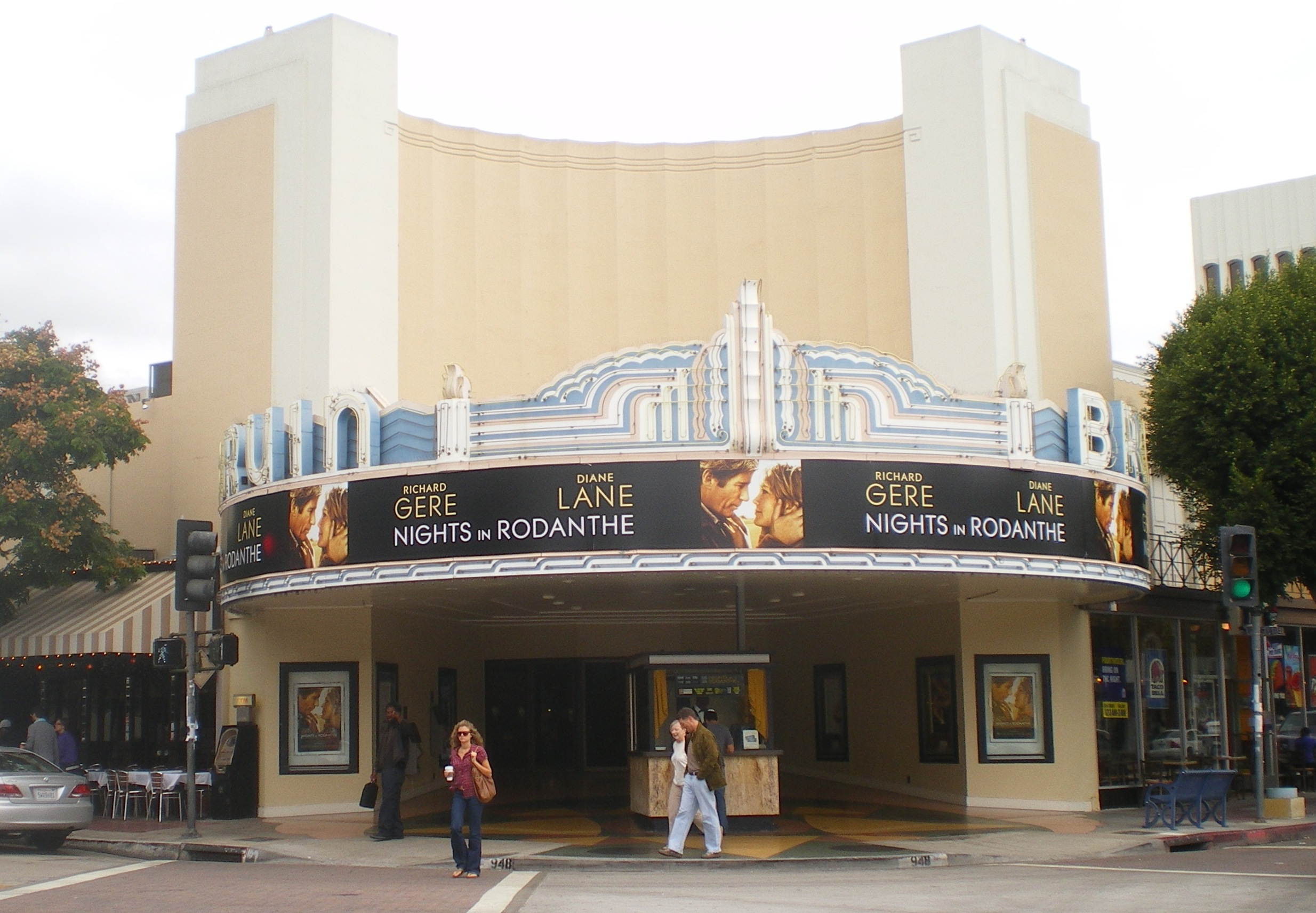
- Fox Bruin Theater

- Location within the Los Angeles metropolitan area
- 34°3′45.76″N 118°26′48.76″W
- Location: 926-950 Broxton Avenue, Westwood, Los Angeles, California

History
- Built: 1937

Site notes
- Architect: S. Charles Lee
- Architectural style: Streamline Moderne
- Governing body: Private

Los Angeles Historic-Cultural Monument
- Designated: June 21, 1988
- Reference no.: 361

The Bruin theater, also known as the Regency Bruin theater or Fox Bruin theater, is a 670-seat movie palace located in the Westwood neighborhood of Los Angeles, California, near the University of California, Los Angeles (UCLA).

== Description ==
The Bruin is located in the heart of the Mediterranean-themed Westwood Village shopping and cinema precinct, opposite the prominent white tower of the Fox Village theater. The structure was designed by movie theater architect, S. Charles Lee, with a Streamline Moderne marquee, and opened in 1937. It is named after the UCLA mascot Joe Bruin. The theater has been used for private events, such as film and television show premieres.

It was designated a Los Angeles Historic-Cultural Monument (HCM #361) in 1988.

== History ==
On December 31, 1937, the Fox Bruin Theater was opened by Fox West Coast Theaters with 876 seats. From 1973 until 2010, it was operated by the Mann theaters chain. From April 2010 until 2024, it was operated by Regency Theaters.

On July 25, 2024, the Bruin theater and the nearby Regency Village theater closed their doors when their leases expired.

Following the Bruin Theater's closure in July 2024, filmmaker Jason Reitman pursued plans to restore and reopen the theater through Bruin Directors Circle, LLC. The group subsequently withdrew from the project claiming that the theater required significantly more extensive restoration work than initially anticipated. Reitman's group filed for bankruptcy, abandoning its plans to reopen the Bruin. The theater remains under its longtime ownership.

In July 2026, Canadian cinema operator Rui Pereira signed a lease to operate the Bruin Theater and announced plans to reopen the venue in October. In August 2026, IndieWire reported alleged racist and antisemitic statements made through social-media accounts associated with Pereira's Kingsway Theater. In a subsequent interview with The Hollywood Reporter, Pereira said that attention surrounding his previous online comments was a distraction from reopening the Bruin and maintained that the theater would welcome all patrons.

Pereira's social media statements were part of a broader pattern of alleged harassment and misconduct by the theater operator, as reported by IndieWire on September 3, 2026. These claims went back to 2009 and included allegations of physical assault, racial discrimination, unpaid debts, and unauthorized film screenings across Pereira's years in Toronto, which he denied. IndieWire cited more than 25 sources across the U.S. and Canada.

The Bruin Theater re-opened on October 23rd, 2026. On October 26, 2026, IndieWire reported a statement attributed to animation studio Laika which claimed the company had initiated legal action to prevent the Bruin Theater from screening Wildwood because of Pereira.

== In popular culture ==
The music video for "Praise You" by Fatboy Slim was filmed in front of the theater. It was animated in Grand Theft Auto V as well, as the Tivoli Cinema. It was prominently featured in Quentin Tarantino's film Once Upon a Time in Hollywood, in which actress Sharon Tate (portrayed by Margot Robbie) is shown watching the film The Wrecking Crew. The Bruin appears in the beginning of 1963's The Caretakers as Polly Bergen walks down Broxton Avenue and purchases a ticket for the show.

== Regency theaters ==
In 1996, Regency theaters was founded by Lyndon Golin and Andrew Golin, brothers, with a theater in Camarillo, California.

In 2010, Mann theaters went out of business, and Regency theaters purchased the Fox theater, Westwood Village and a multiplex cinema at "The Plant" in Van Nuys, California.

Regency theaters operates some former Fox theaters and Mann theaters.
