= Holly Cinema =

Former movie theater in Los Angeles, California

- U.S. Historic district – Contributing property
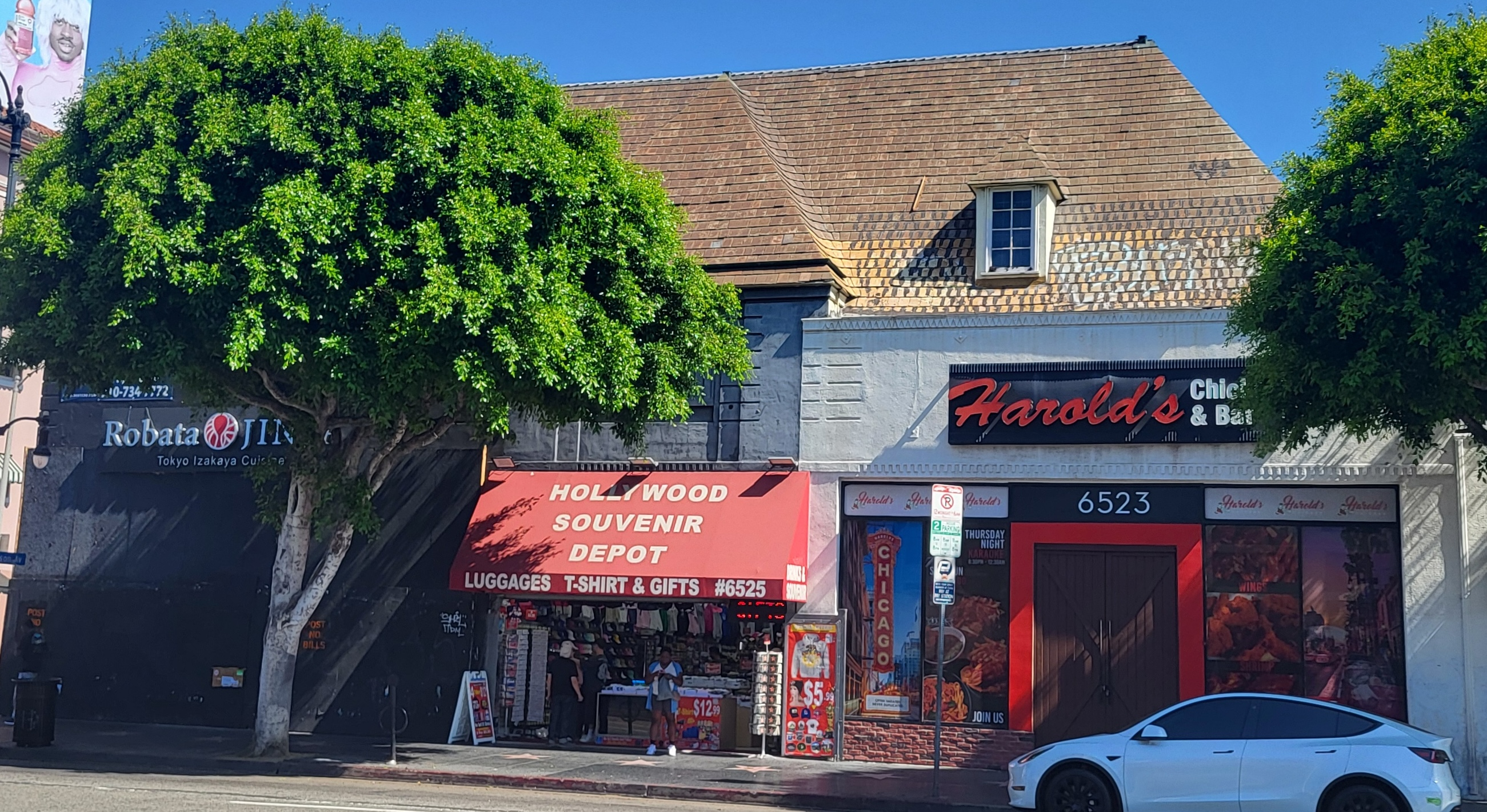
- The building in 2024

- Location within the Los Angeles metropolitan area
- Location: 6523 Hollywood Blvd., Hollywood, California
- Coordinates: 34°06′07″N 118°19′55″W
- Built: 1920
- Architect: E. B. Rust, S. Charles Lee
- Architectural style: Chateauesque
- Part of: Hollywood Boulevard Commercial and Entertainment District (ID85000704)
- Designated CP: April 4, 1985

Holly Cinema, also known as Studio Theatre, Colony Theatre, Music Hall, Academy Theatre, and Loew's Holly Theatre, is a historic former movie theater located at 6523 Hollywood Boulevard in Hollywood, Los Angeles, California. It is best known for exhibiting Caligula exclusively for over a year in 1980–1981.

== History ==
The building that would become Holly Cinema was originally built for retail by E. B. Rust in 1920, and featured a Châteauesque exterior and a 30-foot by 100-foot interior.

In 1931, S. Charles Lee converted the building to the 303-seat, Moderne-styled Studio Theatre for operators Harold B. Franklin and Howard Hughes. Billed as the "World's Most Unique Theatre", this was Hollywood's first "automatic" theater, as it had no ushers, with the theater doors opening automatically as the patrons passed through turnstiles. Additionally, candy, cigarettes, and drinks were sold via coin operated slot machines. The theater opened on July 31, 1931, with a screening of Charles Starrett's The Viking.

In 1935, S. Charles Lee remodeled the theater again, and in 1936, it was renamed Colony Theatre. In 1945, it was renamed again, to Music Hall or Hollywood Music Hall, and its capacity was increased to 488. In 1951, the theater was renamed a third time, to Academy Theatre, and the theater was renovated again in 1961.

Loews bought the theater in 1970, at which point they added a false ceiling, curtained over the art deco interior, and renamed the theater Loew's Holly Theatre. In 1972, General Cinema bought the theater and renamed it Holly Cinema, and in 1974 Sterling Recreation Organization leased the theater to use as a move-over house for the El Capitan.

In 1980–1981, Holly Cinema exhibited the Penthouse production Caligula for 62 weeks.

In 1985, the Hollywood Boulevard Commercial and Entertainment District was added to the National Register of Historic Places, with Holly Cinema listed as a contributing property in the district. Specifically noted were the building's French Chateauesque style as well as its steep hipped roof and stucco coverings.

Pacific Theatres took over the theater in 1985 and shut it down the following year. The building was then gutted and converted back to retail, at one point housing a Church of Scientology testing/learning center. All traces of the building's cinematic past have either been removed or covered over.

== Architecture and design ==
Holly Cinema is designed in the Chateauesque style and features a prominent and steep hipped roof. The building is faced with stucco.

== See also ==
- List of contributing properties in the Hollywood Boulevard Commercial and Entertainment District
