= Mike Gore (theater owner) =

American movie theater owner

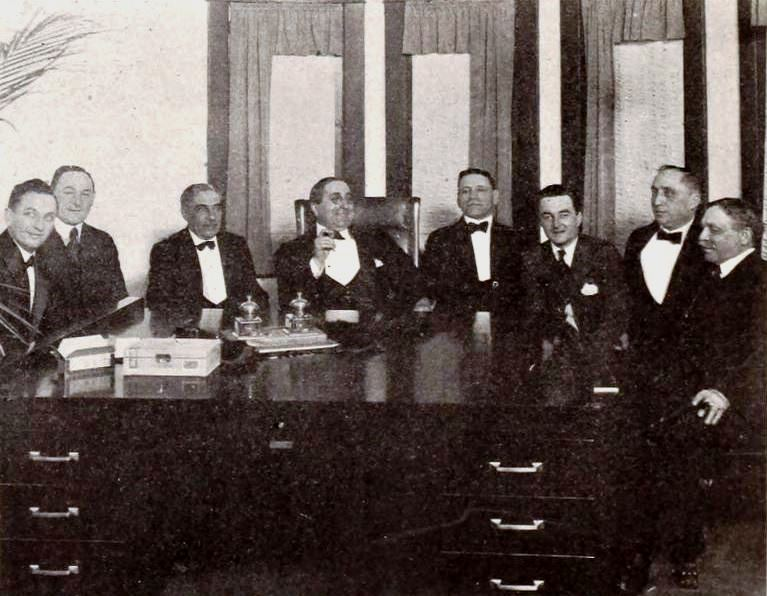
Visitors in Louis B. Mayer's office in 1920, Mike Gore is second from the left

Mike Gore (July 6, 1878 – August 16, 1953) was a movie theater owner who received a star on the Hollywood Walk of Fame for his work in Motion pictures. His star is located in the sidewalk in front of 6315 Hollywood Blvd.

Gore came to the United States from the Russian Empire as a child, settling first in Chicago where he later was in the cigar-manufacturing business. He came to Los Angeles in 1906, when the movie industry was in its early days. He was a co-founder of the West Coast Theatres chain of first-run movie theaters in 1920.
