= Mann Theatres =

American movie theatre chain

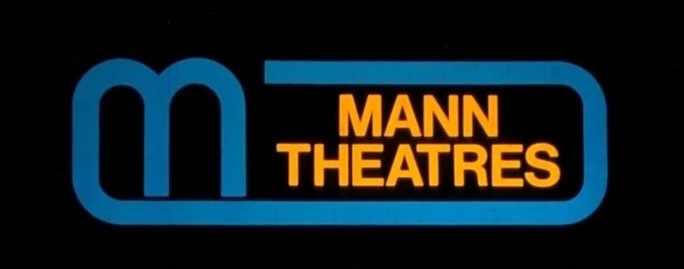

Mann Theatres was an American movie theater chain that predominantly operated in the western United States, with a heavy concentration of theaters in Southern California.

Its motto was "Where Hollywood goes to the movies".

== History ==
The Mann Theatres chain was named after Ted Mann, the founder of the original Minnesota chain. Ted Mann married Rhonda Fleming in 1977. In 1973 Mann purchased the theatre division of National General Pictures, which consisted primarily of the original Fox Theatres chain. Among the theatres acquired in the transaction was Grauman's Chinese Theatre, renamed Mann's Chinese Theatre, in addition to several of the prestigious single-screen theaters in the Los Angeles area, including the Fox Village Theater, the Bruin Theater, the National and the Ogden Theatre, Esquire Theatre, Mayan Theatre, Center Theatre and Aladdin Theatre located in Denver, Colorado.

=== Subsidiary era ===
In 1986, Mann Theatres was acquired by the conglomerate Gulf and Western Industries. In 1987, Warner Communications was brought in as a partner.

In 1997, Mann Theatres was sold to WestStar, a company backed by the private equity firm Warburg Pincus.

=== Demise ===
All the cinemas of Mann Theatres were gradually sold off to other chains.

Mann Theatres was a dominant cinema chain across Colorado, including the Denver area. In 2000, Colorado Cinemas Theatres acquired the Mann Theatres locations in Denver. Carmike Cinemas took over most of the Mann Theatres locations outside of the Denver area.

The company ceased operation on December 27, 2011, with the closing of its last property, the Westlake Village Theaters, which was reopened as a Cinépolis.

== Technologies ==
In October 2008 the Mann Chinese 6 Theatre complex in Hollywood was the first 3-D-ready commercial cinema to unveil the installation of Iosono technology, featuring 380 speakers. In April 2009 the Mann Chinese 6 was among the first to present motion-enhanced theatrical films featuring 30 D-BOX motion controlled seats.

== See also ==
- Cinema and movie theater chains in the United States
