= Christina Weiss Lurie =

Mexican-American documentary producer

- Born: Lorie Christina Weiss; Mexico City, Mexico
- Spouse: Jeffrey Lurie (m. 1992; div. 2012)
- Children: 2
- Parent(s): Lisa and Stanley Weiss

Christina Weiss Lurie is a Mexican-American documentary producer, philanthropist and minority owner of the NFL’s Philadelphia Eagles. She has co-founded three independent film companies—Vox3 Films, Tango Pictures, and Screen Pass Pictures—the last of which, with Jeffrey Lurie, was the company through which Weiss Lurie has shared in two Academy Awrds for documentaries (Inside Job, a 2010 documentary feature, and Inocente, a 2012 documentary short.). While with the Eagles front office, Weiss Lurie founded the Eagles Youth Partnership, which grew to become the Eagles Charitable Foundation (in 2016), of which she served as president until at least April 2018.

== Early life and education ==
Lurie was born to a secular Jewish family in Mexico City, the daughter of Lisa and Stanley A. Weiss. Weiss Lurie holds both United States and Mexican citizenship. She has one brother, Anthony. She moved to London at the age of ten. She attended and graduated from Yale University with a double major in theater and history of art. She then continued her study at the Webber Douglas Academy of Dramatic Art in England, where she dropped out to "discover the world."

== Career ==
=== Film and television ===
After Webber, Weiss moved to Paris. Interested in pursuing a career in cinema, she next headed to Los Angeles, where she worked for Aspect Ratio's Ron Molder, heading his independent film production company (which had produced I Love You to Death in 1990). In a pre-production meeting for that movie, Weiss met Jeffrey Lurie; she then went to work for hiss film production company. The same report describing this meeting refers to her as a former actress, working for that company.

In fall of 2004, Weiss Lurie co-founded the New York-based independent film production company, Vox3 Films, with director Steven Shainberg and fellow producer Andrew Fierberg, to develop and produce "original, provocative and modestly budgeted independent film[s]", through which she has served as a variety of producer roles (executive, co-executive, etc.) on independent features. Her production credits with the company include America Brown (2004), Game 6 (2005), Feel (2006), and Fur: An Imaginary Portrait of Diane Arbus (2006), which starred Nicole Kidman and Robert Downey Jr. Other Vox3 Film productions under Weiss Lurie were Broken English (2007), Never Forever (2007), Adam (2009), and Rage (2009).

Weiss Lurie also established the documentary film company, Screen Pass Pictures, in 2007, with her business partner (and then husband) Jeffrey Lurie, in conjunction with the Lurie Family Foundation. Under the Screen Pass Pictures banner, Weiss Lurie was executive producer for Sergio (2009), Inside Job (2010), Inocente (2012), A Place at the Table (2013), Big Men (2014), and We Are The Giant (2014), two thus far winning Academy Awards (see Awards and recognition).

In 2011, Weiss Lurie co-launched Tango Pictures which focused on producing mainstream films; also in 2011, she partnered with Alan Barnette to develop both scripted and unscripted television shows.

In 2017, Weiss Lurie founded a further company to succeed Vox3 and Screen Pass, the film production company Fourth & Twenty Eight Films, with the stated aim of "focus[ing] on feature film and television series production". To date, its production credits include Dishonesty: The Truth About Lies (2015, with CNBC Documentaries), Invisible Hands (2018, a documentary),Halle Berry's 2020 feature Bruised, and the 2020 period drama and feature, Widow Clicquot. In partnership with Andrew Lazar, Weiss Lurie and Fourth & Twenty Eight has also produced Rupture (2016, with Noomi Rapace), Last Looks (2021, with Mel Gibson and Charlie Hunnam), and Persuasion (2022, with Henry Golding and Dakota Johnson).

=== Philadelphia Eagles ownership ===
In 1994, Weiss Lurie partnered with her then husband Jeffrey Lurie for the purchase of the Eagles from Norman Braman. Weiss Lurie has spearheaded the franchise's philanthropic and sustainability efforts and also contributed to the design of Lincoln Financial Field and the NovaCare Complex – the Eagles’ corporate headquarters and training facility. She was instrumental in changing the Eagles' colors from the traditional kelly green and recreating the logo.

==== Sustainability ====
Weiss Lurie is a strong promoter of the Eagles Go Green Campaign launched in 2003. Go Green is a private initiative to improve the environment by promoting programs that "improve the quality of life in the Philadelphia region, green the environment and reduce the team’s impact on the planet." As part of the initiative, the Eagles use solar power at both of their facilities; have taken steps to reduce their energy consumption and trash output on game days; and plant trees to offset the team's carbon emissions. EYP's Tackling Breast Cancer and Go Green initiatives earned the team the "2011 Sport Team of the Year" award from Beyond Sport, a global organization that promotes, develops and funds the use of sports to create positive social change across the world. Weiss Lurie is also a member of the NFL's Green Club working group, a committee of club and league staff members who help determine and direct the league's environmental initiative.

== Philanthropy ==
In 1995, Weiss Lurie founded the Eagles Youth Partnership (EYP), what would become the Eagles charitable arm. EYP focused on literacy, vision, and after-school programs, and provided eye exams, glasses, and books to over 50,000 low-income children annually in the Greater Philadelphia region (through its Eagles Eye Mobile, and Eagles Book Mobile).

In 2013, Weiss Lurie helped to launch the Tackling Breast Cancer campaign, a partnership between the Philadelphia Eagles and the Thomas Jefferson University Hospital Breast Care Center with all proceeds from the sale of pink Eagles merchandise being donated to the center. As of this date, Weiss Lurie also serves on the board of the Curtis Institute of Music in Philadelphia.

In 2007, Weiss Lurie helped to establish the Lurie Family Foundation which focused on autism and cancer research. She is also a member of the Council on Foreign Relations.

== Awards and recognition ==
In 2005, Philadelphia's EYP charitable organisation, led by Weiss Lurie, received the inaugural Steve Patterson Award for Excellence in Sports Philanthropy. In 2008, the organisation's Go Green Campaign won the Ongoing Commitment Award from the Environmental Media Association. In 2009, the Eagles organisation received the Sustainability Award from the Pennsylvania Environmental Council.

In 2010, Weiss Lurie was a recipient of Drexel University's LeBow College of Business Leaders of the Year award. Also in 2010, her organisation, the Eagles, received worldwide recognition as one of three finalists in the sports world for Beyond Sport's “Sport Team of the Year", earning the team the award in 2011.

Weiss Lurie and then husband Lurie's film production work, which as of 2011 operated as Screen Pass Productions, produced the movie Inside Job (2010), detailing the financial crisis of 2008; it won that year's Academy Award (Oscar) for best documentary film feature, on February 27, 2011. In a released statement, the Luries said they were “humbled” by the award. Two years later, the Luries and their production team won a second Oscar, when Inocente won for Best Documentary Short Film.

== Personal life ==
In a pre-production meeting for I Love You To Death, Weiss met Jeffrey Lurie (grandson of theater owner Philip Smith); they married in 1992 in Gstaad, Switzerland They had two children: a son Julian and a daughter Milena. Weiss speaks three languages fluently: Spanish, French (her mother's native tongue), and English; she also speaks passable German and Italian. Although ethnically Jewish, she feels closest to Buddhism and celebrates both Passover and Christmas with her children. In 2012, the couple announced that they were divorcing; the divorce was finalized in August 2012.

Weiss Lurie is a contemporary art collector.
