= Ted Mann =

American film businessman

- Born: April 16, 1916; Wishek, North Dakota, US
- Died: January 15, 2001 (aged 84); Los Angeles, California, US
- Occupations: Businessman, producer
- Known for: Mann Theatres
- Spouses: Ida Charon (m. 1934; div. 1968) Rhonda Fleming (m. 1977)
- Children: 2

Ted Mann (April 16, 1916 – January 15, 2001) was an American businessman involved in the film industry and head of Mann Theatres. In 1973, he purchased the National General Theatre chain and changed the name of Grauman's Chinese Theatre, which was a part of the chain, to Mann's Chinese Theater.

== Biography ==
Born to a Jewish family in Wishek, North Dakota, Mann started off in the movie business as an usher around the time he attended the University of Minnesota in the 1930s. He rented the Selby Theatre in Saint Paul, Minnesota, for $100 a month running it as a one-man shop serving as ticket seller and projectionist. He was successful and he went on to purchase 25 other theaters and drive-ins in the Midwest. Several of the drive-ins were co-owned with Irving Schectman and Charles Rubenstein. Both Schectman and Rubenstein were close early life friends with Mann, and contributed to Mann's personal and business life development.

In 1970, Mann sold his theater chain to General Cinema Corporation (founded by Philip Smith and then led by Richard A. Smith) and moved to California. The first production to his credit was 1969's The Illustrated Man, based on a Ray Bradbury book. He didn't stay out of the theater business for long, and purchased the troubled 276-screen National General Theatre chain in 1973. Mann soon expanded the chain to 360 screens, but again sold off his theaters in 1986, this time to Gulf+Western, which later renamed itself to Paramount Communications (which itself became part of Viacom). Grauman's Theater eventually regained its original name in late 2001.

Both the Orpheum and Pantages venues of today's Hennepin Theatre District in Minneapolis were once owned by Mann. He eventually owned at least six theaters in the city's downtown region. The Ted Mann Concert Hall at the University of Minnesota in Minneapolis is named for him.

The 277-seat Ted Mann Theater serves as the Academy Museum’s most utilized theater, offering curated screenings and special programs on a daily basis.

== Philanthropy ==
In 1984, he founded the Ted Mann Foundation which contributed to the Salvation Army, Boys & Girls Clubs, United Way, Wilshire Boulevard Temple, the United Jewish Fund, Operation Exodus, and the Jerusalem Foundation.

== Personal life ==
On June 24, 1934, Ted Mann married Ida Charon. Before their divorce, Ted and Ida had two daughters. He married actress Rhonda Fleming in 1977, and they remained together until Mann died at age 84 in Los Angeles of complications from a stroke.

== Filmography ==
=== Producer/executive producer ===
- The Illustrated Man (1969)
- Buster and Billie (1974)
- Lifeguard (1976)
- The Nude Bomb (1980)
- Brubaker (1980)
- Krull (1983)
