= JTE =

JTE may refer to:

- JTE Multimedia, a medical journal publishing company
- JTE-907, an anti-inflammatory drug
- Jahn–Teller effect, an effect which leads to spontaneous symmetry-breaking in the structures of molecules
