= J. R. Cominsky =

American publisher and journalist (1899–1968)

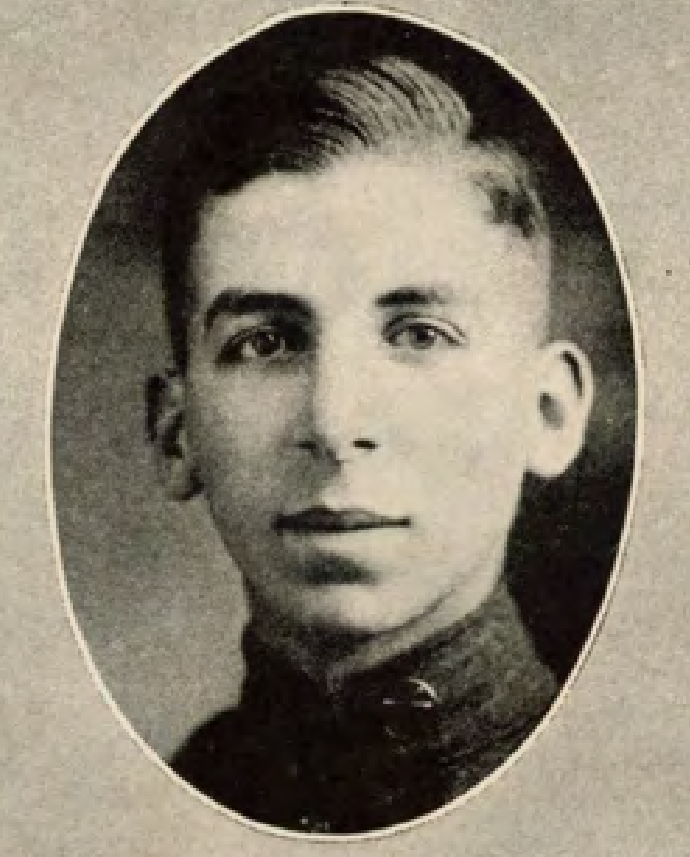
- Cominsky, c. 1919
- Born: Jacob Robert Cominsky; April 11, 1899; Rochester, New York, U.S.
- Died: August 2, 1968 (aged 69); Asbury Park, New Jersey, U.S.
- Burial place: Adath Yeshurun Cemetery, Syracuse, New York
- Education: University of Rochester (AB)
- Spouse: Roslyn Sylvia Weisberg (m. 1929)

Signature
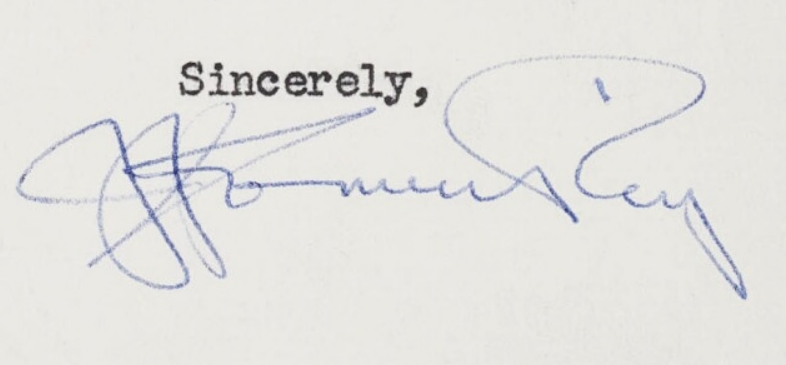

Jacob Robert "Jack" Cominsky (April 11, 1899 – August 6, 1968) was an American journalist who served as executive vice-president of the Saturday Review from 1942 until his death, diversifying its content and dramatically increasing revenue. After becoming publisher in 1952, Cominsky oversaw the magazine's 1961 purchase by the McCall Corporation for over $3 million and subsequently served as the firm's vice-president. By the time of his death, the once-penniless Review was in its heyday as a middle-market magazine and at the "peak of its influence".

== Life and early career ==
Jacob Robert Cominsky was born in Rochester, New York, on April 11, 1899. He was the youngest of five children born to Marcus and Rebecca Maxon Cominsky. A graduate of East High School, "Jake" won a state scholarship to the University of Rochester. There, he was associate editor and then editor-in-chief of its newspaper, Campus; managing editor of its yearbook, Interpres; chairman of the University Banquet Committee; and a member of the University Council. He also enlisted as a private in the Student Army Training Corps, but did not see combat in World War I. In the Interpres, Cominsky was described as having "a wonderful nose ... for news". He wrote for the Rochester Democrat and Chronicle from 1916 and when he graduated with an AB in Arts in 1920, he joined the newspaper as a full reporter.

In 1925, Cominsky became city editor of the Democrat and Chronicle. During this time, he met fellow Rochester Jew, pianist Roslyn Sylvia Weisberg, who was two years his junior. Weisberg was the first woman graduate from the Eastman School of Music, University of Rochester, and received three fellowships to the Juilliard School. She would later perform recitals and as a soloist with the philharmonic orchestras of Milwaukee and Rochester. The couple were wed at a Syracuse synagogue on October 29, 1929, and remained so until his death; they had no children, and she never remarried.

== The New York Times and the Saturday Review ==
Beginning in 1920, Cominsky had been Rochester correspondent for the Associated Press and feature writer for the Sunday edition of the New York World. In 1928, despite limited knowledge, he joined the business team of The New York Times, moving in the following year to Forest Hills, Queens. He served as national advertising manager of the paper from 1935 to 1936.

Cominsky quit the Times in October 1942 after he was offered the position of Executive Vice-President in charge of advertising with the Saturday Review of Literature by its editor, Norman Cousins. Acting probably "against the strongest advice of friends and business associates" (according to Cousins), Cominsky took the job, and with "total dedication" worked with Cousins to transform the literary supplement into a general periodical (one brochure was headed: "Now... 12 magazines for the price of one") to attract more advertising revenue and readers. The 'magazine-within-a-magazine' concept worked, and in Cominsky's two decades, circulation increased from 30,000 to 600,000, the largest percentage increase of any periodical. Advertising volume in particular grew from $40,000 in 1942—of which $30,000 was in mere renewals—to $2.6 million in 1963.

In 1952, Cominsky became the magazine's publisher, in addition to his advertising responsibilities. That same year, "of Literature" was dropped from the Review's official title in acknowledgement of its wider scope. Among Cominsky's decisions were publishing the magazines of the Lincoln Center and the New York Philharmonic, as well as the programs of the Metropolitan Opera, and overseeing negotiations for the Review's 1961 acquisition by the McCall Corporation "to assure its perpetuity" for over $3 million in stock. Subsequently, Cominsky served also as McCall's Vice-President.

== Death, legacy and honors ==
Cominsky died of a heart attack at his summer home in Asbury Park, New Jersey, on August 6, 1968, aged 69; his main residence was on Park Avenue in Manhattan. He is buried at the Adath Yeshurun Cemetery of Syracuse. After Roslyn died in 2000, she was buried beside him. A memorial service in Cominsky's honor was held the same day as his death at the Lincoln Center, with attendees including music critic Irving Kolodin and chairman of the Metropolitan Opera Anthony A. Bliss, while Cousins served as moderator. Cominsky was succeeded as publisher by his associate, William D. Patterson. In 1971, two entrepreneurs purchased the Review and split it into four monthlies, which went insolvent in 1973. Despite attempts at revivals, including by Cousins, the magazine closed due to reduced sales in 1982.

Cominsky's papers and photographs stored with his wife's at the Sibley Music Library of the Eastman School. The two were prominent benefactors to their alma mater, and are commemorated in the Jacob Robert Cominsky Reading Room, the (Roslyn) Cominsky Promenade and the Cominsky Tower, which houses Eastman's main dormitory.

J. R. Cominsky received the University of Rochester's Alumni Key for distinguished work in 1946, and he served on its board of trustees from 1956 to 1959. He was also a member of the Genesee Society, Phi Beta Kappa and the Delta Rho fraternity for journalists. Cominsky received an honorary Doctor of Letters from Ithaca College on May 18, 1968.
