= National Theatre, Boston =

National Theatre, Boston may refer to:

- National Theatre, Boston (1836)
- National Theatre, Boston (1911)
