= Jeffrey Lurie =

American businessman and sports team owner (born 1951)

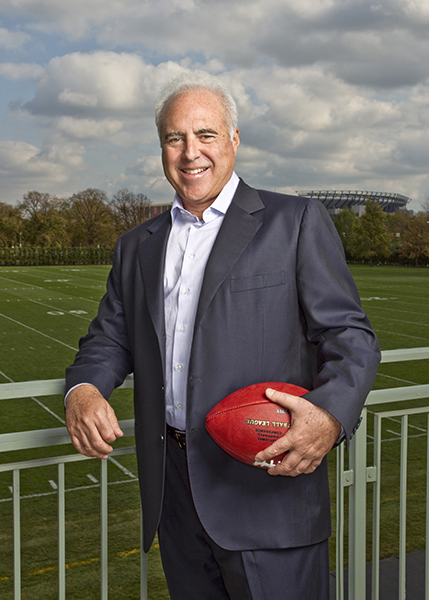
- Lurie in 2010
- Born: Jeffrey Robert Lurie; September 8, 1951 (age 75); Boston, Massachusetts, U.S.
- Education: Clark University, Boston University, Brandeis University
- Occupation: Businessman
- Spouses: Christina Weiss Lurie (m. 1992; div. 2012) Tina Lai (m. 2013)
- Family: Philip Smith (grandfather); Richard A. Smith (uncle)
- Football career

Philadelphia Eagles
- Title: Chairman/chief executive officer

Career history
- Philadelphia Eagles (1994–present) Chairman/chief executive officer

Awards and highlights
- 2× Super Bowl champion (LII, LIX); Philadelphia Eagles Hall of Fame

Jeffrey Robert Lurie (born September 8, 1951) is an American businessman, documentary film producer, and, since 1994, owner of the Philadelphia Eagles of the National Football League (NFL). The Eagles have won two Super Bowls under his tenure as owner.

== Early life and education ==
Born Jeffrey Robert Lurie in Boston, Massachusetts on September 8, 1951, to an American Jewish family, Lurie is the son of Nancy (née Smith) and Morris John Lurie. His grandfather, Philip Smith, founded the General Cinema movie theater chain, an early large operator of U.S. drive-in movie theaters. He has two siblings, Peter and Cathy. His uncle is Richard A. Smith.

Lurie attended Browne and Nichols School in Cambridge, Massachusetts. Lurie's father died on April 14, 1961, at the age of 44; Jeffrey was nine years old.

Lurie went on to earn a B.A. from Clark University, and a master's degree in psychology from Boston University. He then earned a doctorate in social policy from The Heller School for Social Policy and Management at Brandeis University, where he wrote his thesis on the depiction of women in Hollywood movies.

== Career ==
=== Academia ===
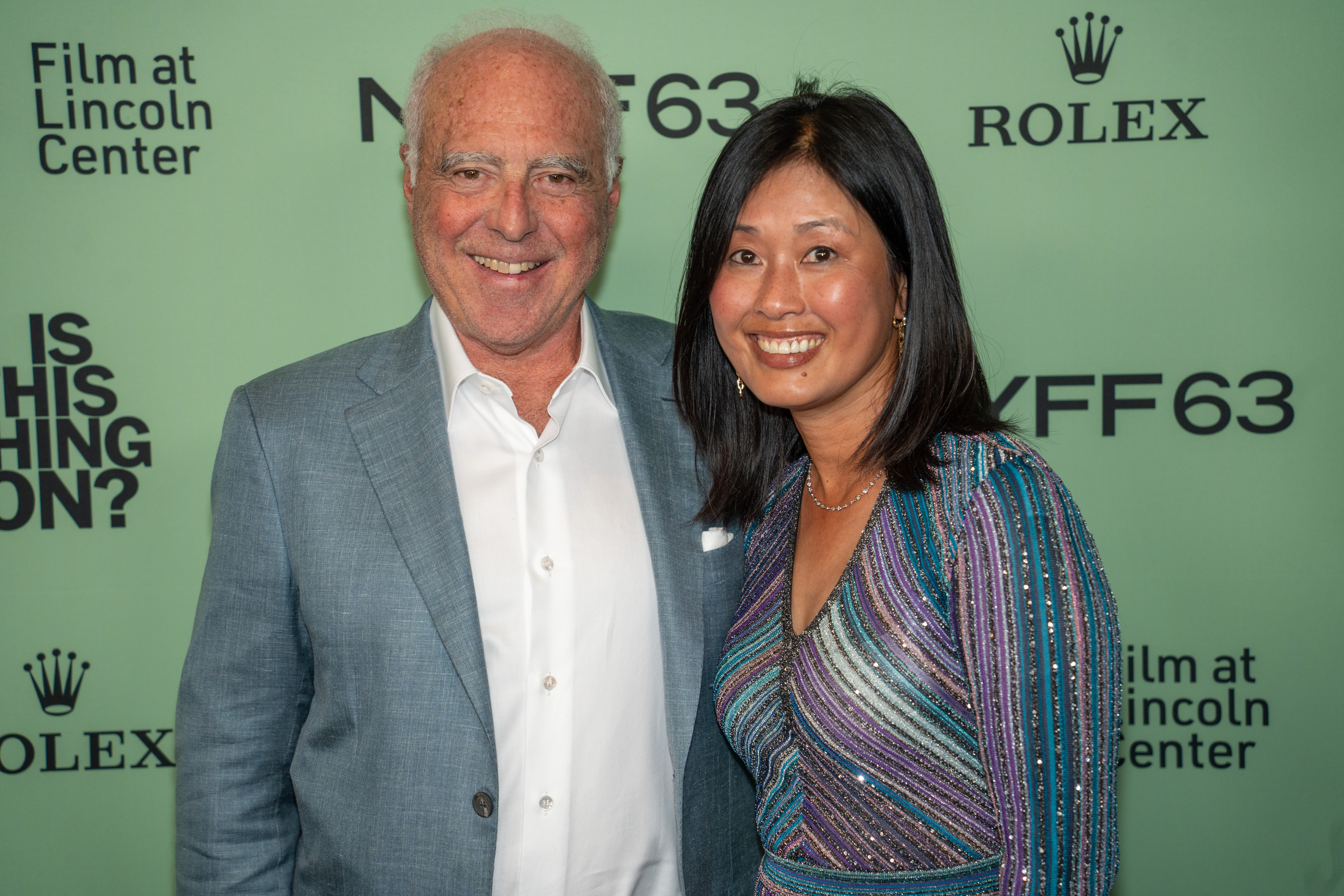
Jeffrey Lurie and Tina Lai at the 2025 New York Film Festival for Is This Thing On?

Forbes has described Lurie as beginning "his professional career as a social policy teacher at Boston University"; specifically, he served as an adjunct assistant professor of social policy at Boston University.

=== Film production ===
In 1983, Lurie left academia to join General Cinema Corporation, the conglomerate that began as an early movie theater chain (founded by his grandfather, Philip Smith). At the time he joined, General Cinema was headed by his uncle, Richard A. Smith. At General Cinema, Lurie worked as an executive in the company as liaison between General Cinema and the production community in Hollywood, and as an advisor in the company's national film buying office.

In 1984, General Cinema acquired a minority interest in Carter Hawley Hale, at the time the tenth-largest clothing retailer in the United States, whose holdings included Bergdorf Goodman and Neiman-Marcus. In 1993, its holding company, by then named Harcourt General, spun-off General Cinema as a separate company. After competition forced the closure of a number of General Cinema locations, General Cinema filed for Chapter 11 bankruptcy on October 11, 2000, with accompanying resignation of Richard A. Smith and a further employed Smith family member. On December 7, 2001, AMC Theatres agreed to buy GC Companies, Inc. as part of GC's Chapter 11 reorganization plan, an acquisition completed on March 29, 2002. Lurie departed General Cinema.

By 1985, Lurie had also created his first film company, Chestnut Hill Productions; through it, he produced a number of feature film releases, "not necessarily considered artistic masterpieces", including Foxfire (1996), starring Angelina Jolie. The company also produced television commercials.

Chestnut Hill Productions has since produced a string of Hollywood movies and TV shows, initially starting off with a multi-feature joint venture with Tri-Star Pictures to develop projects. In 1987, three Chestnut Hill projects were picked up by MGM/UA Communications Co., two each by Paramount Pictures and Warner Bros. Pictures, and one by Universal Pictures; a majority of the eight Chestnut Hill productions would be received by Tri-Star Pictures, which then became an independent production company. (Tri-Star Pictures received first look at all projects handled by Chestnut Hill Productions, with Tri-Star and Chestnut Hill co-financing development and Tri-Star picking up the cost of production.)

Lurie's wife, Christina, has joined him as a producer in his film work, which as of 2011 was operating as Screen Pass Productions. On February 27, 2011, the movie Inside Job (2010), produced by the Luries and detailing the financial crisis of 2008, won an Academy Award (Oscar) for best documentary film;

In a released statement, the Luries said they were “humbled” by the award.

Lurie was 59 years of age, at the time. Two years later, Lurie won a second Oscar when Inocente, a film that he executive produced, won for Best Documentary Short Film.

=== Philadelphia Eagles ownership ===
As a fan of all the Boston sports teams, Lurie went to games and put himself to sleep listening to the Boston Red Sox on his transistor radio. The Luries had been New England Patriots season-ticket holders since the franchise began in 1960, the year the American Football League was founded. Lurie cheered for Gino Cappelletti, Houston Antwine, and Babe Parilli. In 1993, Lurie tried to buy the Patriots, but he dropped out of the bidding at $150 million. (His uncle Richard Smith nixed the purchase based on the financials.) Lurie's name also had surfaced in sale talks regarding the Los Angeles Rams, and he was a potential investor in a bid for a Baltimore expansion team with Robert Tisch, who subsequently bought 50% of the New York Giants.

Five months later, Richard Smith agreed to let his nephew buy the Philadelphia Eagles; Lurie contacted Norman Braman, then owner of the Eagles. Lurie bought the Philadelphia Eagles on May 6, 1994, from Braman for $195 million (equivalent to $424 million in 2025). Lurie and his mother, Nancy Lurie Marks, the only daughter of Philip Smith, borrowed $190 million from the Bank of Boston to buy the team. To back the Bank of Boston loan, Lurie put up millions of dollars' worth of personal stock in Harcourt General and GC Companies Inc. as equity. He and his mother also put up stock in the family trust as collateral so Lurie could borrow the rest.

In 2017, Forbes valued the Eagles at $2.65 billion, ranking them 10th among NFL teams in value. By 2024 this valuation had increased to $6.6 billion with the Eagles ranked 8th amongst all 32 NFL teams in value. On February 4, 2018, the Eagles defeated the Patriots to win Super Bowl LII by the score of 41–33, giving Lurie his first title as Eagles owner. The victory evened the score with New England, as the previous Lurie-era Super Bowl appearance was a 24–21 loss to the Patriots in Super Bowl XXXIX.

On February 9, 2025, the Eagles defeated the Kansas City Chiefs to win Super Bowl LIX by the score of 40–22, giving Lurie his second title as Eagles' owner. The win evened the score against Kansas City (the Eagles had lost to the Chiefs in Super Bowl LVII), and denied the Chiefs' bid to become the only team to win three Super Bowls in a row.

=== Wealth ===
As of June 2026, Forbes's estimates appraised Lurie's net worth at $7.6 billion, making him one of the world's 500 wealthiest people.

== Filmography ==
He was a producer in all films unless otherwise noted.

=== Film ===
Year	Film	Box Office
1988	Sweet Hearts Dance	$3,790,493
1990	I Love You to Death	$16,186,793
1991	V.I. Warshawski	$11,128,309
1996	Foxfire	$269,300

As an actor

Year	Film	Role
1996	Jerry Maguire	Himself

Thanks

Year	Film	Role
1996	Jerry Maguire	Special thanks

=== Television ===
Year	Title	Credit	Notes
1993	Blind Side	Executive producer	Television film
1994	State of Emergency	Executive producer	Television film
1996	Malibu Shores	Co-executive producer Co-producer	
2014	POV	Executive producer	

As an actor

Year	Title	Role	Notes
1998	The Garbage Picking Field Goal Kicking Philadelphia Phenomenon	Barney's Friend	Television film
2000	Arliss	Himself	

== Awards and recognition ==
- As owner and chairman of the Eagles, two-time Super Bowl champion (LII and LIX).

== Personal life ==
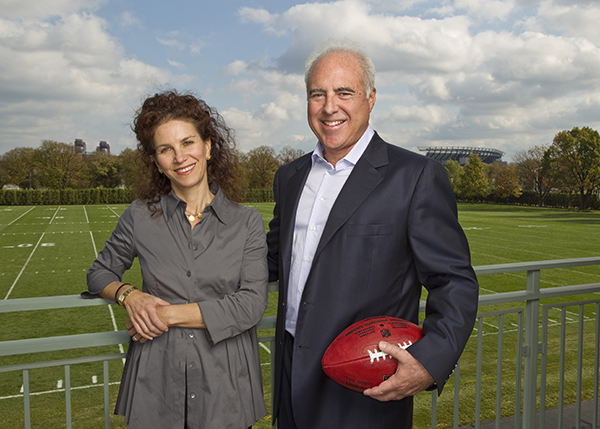
Christina and Jeffrey Lurie in 2010

In a pre-production meeting at his film production company, working on the film, I Love You to Death (1990), Lurie met Christina Weiss, a former actress who working for the company. Lurie married Weiss in Gstaad, Switzerland in 1992, and they have had two children, a daughter Milena (born 1993) and a son Julian (born 1995).

Lurie was said, by his wife Christina, to "lov[e] some of the [Jewish] holidays, like Passover", but was further described to have made no effort to provide a religious education for his children, and was otherwise described as a non-practicing Jew.

In 2012, Christina and Jeffrey Lurie announced that they were divorcing, a process that was finalized in August 2012. On May 4, 2013, he married again, to Tina Lai.

In 2020, Forbes ranked Lurie as No. 319 on the Forbes 400 list of the richest people in America.

Sporting positions
Preceded by Norman Braman	Philadelphia Eagles owner 1994–present	Incumbent
