= Saturday Review (American magazine) =

American weekly magazine (1920–1986)

- Editor: Norman Cousins, 1942–1971, 1973–1977
- Categories: U.S. culture; book, music, and movie reviews; education
- Frequency: Weekly
- Circulation: 660,000 (peak)
- Publisher: various
- Founder: Henry Seidel Canby
- First issue: 1920
- Final issue: June 1986
- Country: United States
- Language: English
- ISSN: 0036-4983

Saturday Review, previously The Saturday Review of Literature, was an American weekly magazine established in 1924. Norman Cousins was the editor from 1940 to 1971. Under Cousins, it was described as "a compendium of reportage, essays and criticism about current events, education, science, travel, the arts and other topics."

At its peak, Saturday Review was influential as the base of several widely read critics (e.g., Wilder Hobson, music critic Irving Kolodin, and theater critics John Mason Brown and Henry Hewes), and was often known by its initials as SR. It was never very profitable and eventually succumbed to the decline of general-interest magazines after restructuring and trying to reinvent itself more than once during the 1970s and 1980s.

== History ==
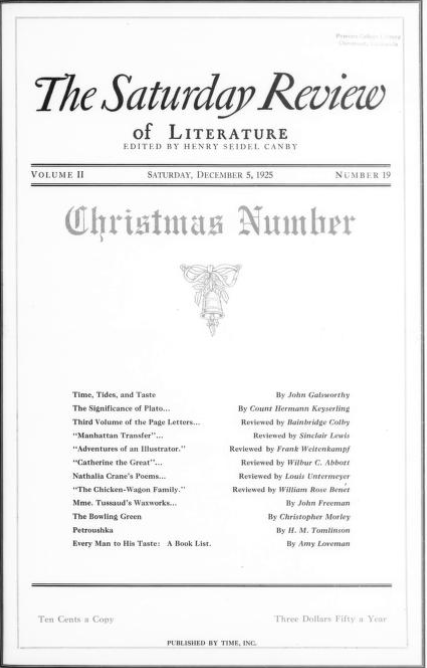
Cover of December 5, 1925, with the original name

Henry Seidel Canby established the publication in 1924. It had originated years earlier as the Saturday books section of the New York Evening Post. But when the paper's new owner, Cyrus H.K. Curtis, decided to eliminate the section as an economy move (and because he thought it too "highbrow"), it's editors resigned and established it as an independent magazine. Bernard DeVoto was the editor in 1936–1938. In 1950, John Barkham became book reviewer there. Until 1952, it was known as The Saturday Review of Literature.

The magazine was purchased by the McCall Corporation in 1961.

Under the editorship of Cousins (1940–1971) and the vice-presidency of J. R. Cominsky, The Saturday Review reached its maximum circulation of 660,000 and cultural influence. Cousins resigned when it was sold, along with McCall Books, to a group led by the two co-founders of Psychology Today, which they had recently sold to Boise Cascade. They split the magazine into four separate monthlies and renamed the publishing company Saturday Review Press, but the experiment ended in insolvency two years later. Former editor Cousins purchased it and recombined the units with World, a new magazine that he had started in the meantime. Briefly it was called SR World before it reverted to Saturday Review. Saturday Review Press was sold separately to E. P. Dutton.

The magazine was sold in 1977 to a group led by Carll Tucker, who sold it in 1980 to Macro Communications, the owner of the business magazine Financial World. It was insolvent again in 1982 and was sold to Missouri entrepreneur Jeffrey Gluck . A new group of investors in 1984 resurrected it briefly. According to Greg Lindsay writing for Folio twenty years later, most people consider 1982 "the year Saturday Review died".

Penthouse publisher Bob Guccione acquired all properties in 1987 and used the title briefly from 1993 for an online publication at AOL.

== Revival ==
In December 2010, business columnist for The Philadelphia Inquirer Joseph N. DiStefano reported in his blog that John T. Elduff of JTE Multimedia planned to "revive" both Collier's and Saturday Review as print and online magazines—mainly print, "for Americans 55 to 90". Both would "have a liberal share of attention to research" and look like they did in the 1950s.

In 2011, JTE Multimedia made use of the Saturday Review name with its website, Saturday Review–Drug Trials, to report on clinical drug research, focusing on inconclusive and adverse trial results. The site disappeared in 2016, with its home page essentially unchanged since its launch date.

In 2026, Milton Grin, M.D., the son of one original publishers S. Spencer Grin, along with Mark Maslan, M.D., relaunched the Saturday Review with a mission that "that thoughtful ideas still matter, that respectful disagreement strengthens democracy, and that the most important questions deserve more than quick answers."
