= Richard A. Smith (businessman) =

American business executive (1924–2020)

- Born: Richard Alan Smith; November 1, 1924; New York City, U.S.
- Died: September 9, 2020 (aged 95); Chestnut Hill, Massachusetts, U.S.
- Occupation: Businessman
- Known for: CEO of General Cinema Corporation
- Spouse: Susan Flax
- Children: 4
- Parent: Philip Smith
- Relatives: Jeffrey Lurie (nephew)

Richard Alan Smith (November 1, 1924 – September 9, 2020) was an American businessman who was CEO of General Cinema Corporation.

== Biography ==
Smith was born in 1924 the son of Philip Smith. His father founded Midwest Drive-In Theaters which in 1941, operated 9 of 15 drive-in movie theaters in the U.S. In 1946, he joined his father's company. In 1947, the company was one of the first to open a theater in a shopping mall in Framingham, Massachusetts. By the 1950s, the Midwest Drive-In Theatres operated 53 drive-ins and branched out into other lines of business including the Richard's Drive-Ins restaurant chain, Amy Joe's Pancake Houses, and several bowling alleys in order to diversify their revenues which were under pressure as more people stayed home to watch television. In 1960, the company changed its name to General Drive-In Corp and went public on the New York Stock Exchange although Smith retained a controlling interest. His father died in 1961 and Richard succeeded him as CEO. Smith changed the company's name to General Cinema in 1964 to better reflect the shift in the industry away from drive-in theaters.

Smith diversified and expanded the company through acquisitions. In the late 1960s, General Cinema began purchasing bottling franchises eventually becoming the largest independent bottler in the United States. In 1970, they purchased the Mann Theatres chain (founded by Ted Mann) for $6.6 million. In 1972, they purchased an interest in 47 indoor theaters in Louisiana and Florida from the Loews Corporation (founded by Laurence Tisch and Robert Tisch) for $16 million. Smith's diversification efforts paid off: in 1985, the bottling operations were 70% of operating profits and General Cinema marked its 12th straight year of operating profits (since Smith was appointed CEO, General Cinema had been profitable for 24 of 25 years). Smith also participated in greenmailing: he purchased a substantial interest in Heublein Inc. forcing it to find a friendly suitor earning Smith a substantial profit when he sold his shares.

In 1984, General Cinema purchased a controlling interest in Carter Hawley Hale, the tenth largest clothing retailer in the United States and owner of the Bergdorf Goodman, Neiman-Marcus, John Wanamaker's, Thalhimers, and Holt Renfrew chains, saving it from a hostile takeover from Leslie Wexner. In 1989, General Cinema sold its bottling division for $1.75 billion. In 1991, General Cinema purchased Harcourt Brace Jovanovich for $1.5 billion. In 1993, the company split into two companies: Harcourt General consisted of the publishing business and the controlling interest in the retail group (then called the Neiman-Marcus Group); and GC Companies, Inc. consisted of the movie theater division in which the Smith family retained a 28 percent controlling interest. In 1994, Smith re-evaluated the portfolio of theaters and sold 14 theaters for $14 million and closed an additional 37 theaters in 1994 and 12 in 1995. They also cautiously expanded into megaplexes with sit-down cafes, seat-side service, "loveseats," gourmet food and coffee, and liquor; and associated with top brands such as Starbucks, Pepsi, Taco Bell, and Pizzeria Uno.

In 2000, General Cinema sold Harcourt General to publisher Reed-Elsevier for $5.7 billion and in 2005, they sold Neiman Marcus to private equity firms TPG and Warburg Pincus for $5.1 billion (the Smith family earned $600 million from their interest).

== Philanthropy ==
He and his wife founded the Richard and Susan Smith Family Foundation. Since 1973, the foundation has donated $45.6 million to Boston's Jewish community of which $24 million was given to Combined Jewish Philanthropies of Boston (CJP).

== Personal life ==
In 1952, Smith married Susan Flax who was Jewish. They had four children: James Smith (who died in 1970), Amy Smith Berylson, Robert Smith, and Debra Smith Knez. His daughter is married to Brian Knez. His son, Robert Smith and son-in-law Brian Knez, were co-CEOs of Harcourt General until its sale then co-founded private equity shop Castanea Partners in 2001. His nephew is Jeffrey Lurie; in 1994, he and his sister provided collateral for a $185 million loan enabling Jeff to purchase the Philadelphia Eagles.

Smith died on September 9, 2020, aged 95.
