= Steve Harrison (advertising) =

British copywriter, creative director and author

- Born: Blackpool, United Kingdom
- Education: University of Manchester
- Occupations: Advertising executive, copywriter, creative director, author

Steve Harrison is a British copywriter, creative director, and author.

As of 2005 he had won more Lions Direct trophies than any other creative director in the world.

== Career in Advertising ==
Born in Blackpool, Steve Harrison completed a doctoral thesis on American Society, Cinema, and Television: 1950–1960 at the University of Manchester. At the age of 30, he traveled to London and secured a researcher position at Ogilvy & Mather. After 11 months, he was hired as a copywriter at Ogilvy and Mather Direct after their global vice chairman, Drayton Bird, noticed a report that Harrison had written. In 1989, he was made Head of Copy at the agency, and by 1997, he was European Creative Director.

In 2001, Harrison founded Harrison Troughton Wunderman after the Wunderman owned agency Impiric purchased Harrison's Agency, HPT Brand Response. The agency went on to produce a number of campaigns for brands including Xerox, IBM, Microsoft, Vodafone, and Rolls-Royce.

In 2006, Harrison became the first Creative Director to head up the Direct Jury at the Cannes Lions International Festival of Creativity.

In 2007 Steve Harrison stood down as Worldwide Creative Director of Wunderman following a management restructure of the Advertising Agency.

== Awards ==
Harrison has won three gold, five silver, and two bronze Lions for his work.

== Study of Howard Gossage ==
In 2012, Steve Harrison authored a book on the advertising pioneer Howard Gossage entitled 'Changing the world is the only fit work for a grown man'. Harrison's study of Howard Gossage began when he came across Gossage's book 'Is there any hope for advertising' in the library of Ogilvy and Mather New York.

Harrison started out intending to make a documentary about Howard Gossage with a friend. He wrote a treatment for this documentary, which then became the outline for his book.

== Published works ==
In 2010, Steve Harrison authored the book 'How to do better creative work'. In their review of the book, Campaign Magazine called it 'essential reading for anyone looking to demystify the creative process'.
