= Business Executives for National Security =

American public-private partnership non-profit organization

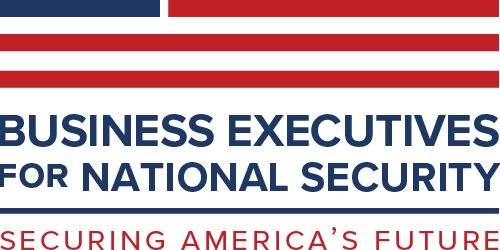
- Established: 1982; 44 years ago
- Founder: Stanley A. Weiss
- Type: 501(c)(3) nonpartisan, nonprofit organization
- Purpose: Public/private partnerships, defense industry, and national security
- Location: 1030 15th Street, NW Washington, D.C., U.S.
- Coordinates: 38°54′12.85″N 77°2′5.9″W
- Chairman: Mark J. Gerencser
- President and CEO: Timothy Ray
- Chief Operating Officer: Christopher Craige
- Website: www.bens.org

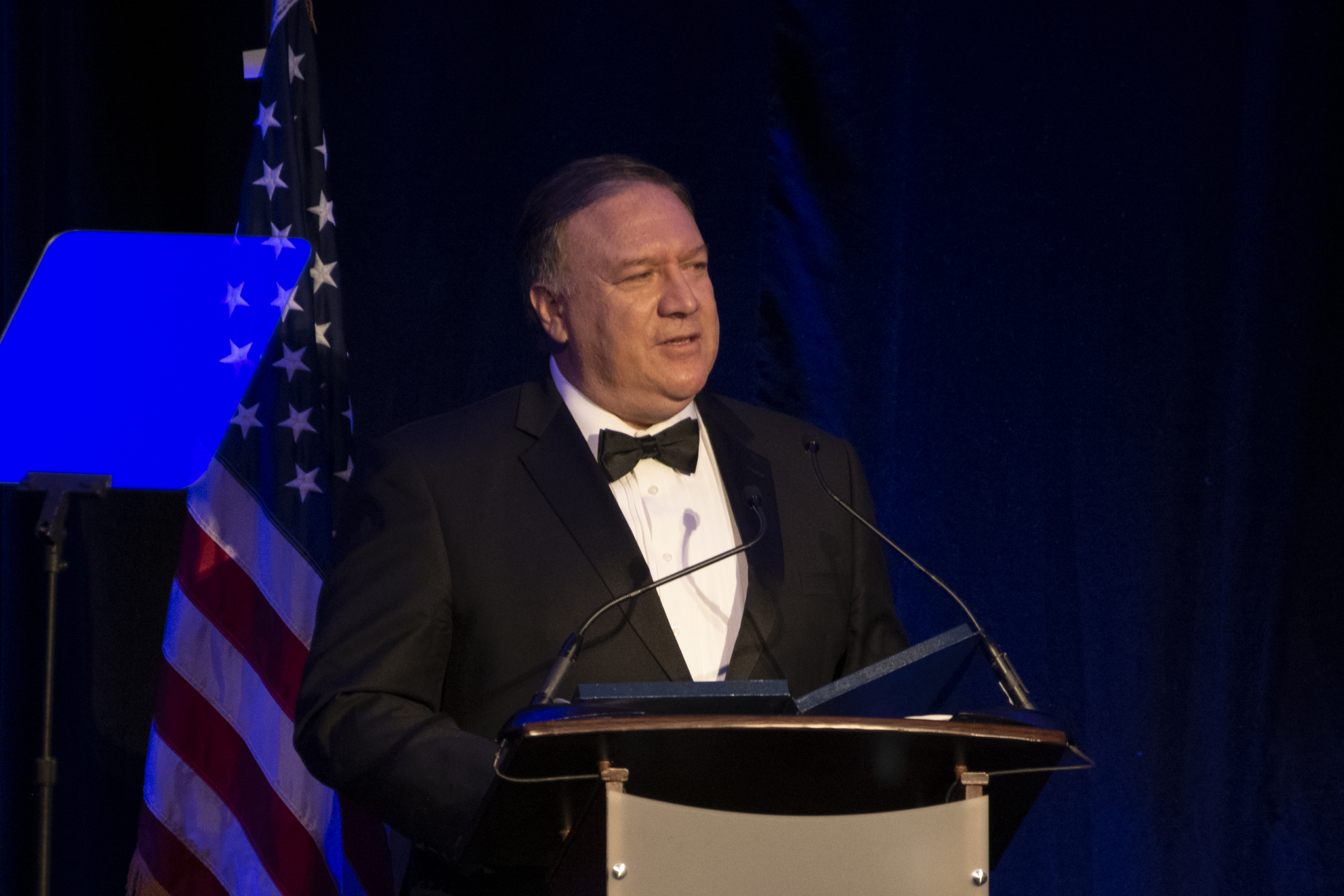
Secretary of State Mike Pompeo speaks at the 2019 BENS Gala and Award Ceremony

Business Executives for National Security (BENS) is an American nonpartisan, nonprofit organization located in Washington, D.C. BENS focuses on providing private-sector knowledge and solutions to the challenges of national security. Through a national network of members and seven regional directors, BENS connects business and industry experts with national security leaders.

Prominent members include Amazon founder Jeff Bezos, former Cisco chairman John P. Morgridge, and former Infor CEO Charles E. Phillips. The organization's current President and CEO is retired U.S. Air Force General Timothy Ray, former commander of the Air Force Global Strike Command. Their current chairman is Mark J. Gerencser, former Managing Partner of Booz Allen Hamilton.

== History ==
BENS was founded in 1982 by mining executive Stanley A. Weiss. After 25 years in the business industry, Weiss became interested in the geostrategic challenges of nuclear weapons and mutually assured destruction. At a 3-day conference on nuclear conflict, Weiss realized that the "problem was being addressed from every professional point of view except one: No one from the business community had been asked to contribute." Weiss' belief that business leaders could provide useful input to national security policy led to BENS' founding.

BENS’ early work focused extensively on initiatives aimed at U.S.-Soviet threat reduction and inefficiencies within support functions of the Department of Defense, including the maintenance and construction of military housing. The organization has also been active in Base Realignment and Closure initiatives since the late 1980s, championing the process and helping to develop transition plans for locations affected by base closure. Over the last decade the organization has expanded its focus, addressing issues such as cybersecurity, domestic counterterrorism, and talent management. They have also broadened their partnerships to include other government agencies such as the Departments of State, Treasury, and Homeland Security; the Office of the Director of National Intelligence; and the unified combatant commands.
