= Stanley A. Weiss =

American business executive and writer (1926–2021)

- Born: December 21, 1926; Philadelphia, Pennsylvania, U.S.
- Died: August 26, 2021 (aged 94); London, England
- Education: Georgetown University School of Foreign Service; Harvard University Center for International Affairs
- Occupations: Mining Executive; Founding Chairman of Business Executives for National Security (BENS); Philanthropist
- Notable work: Manganese The Other Uses (1977); Being Dead is Bad for Business (2017)
- Spouse: Lisa (Popper) Weiss (1958 – present)
- Children: Anthony Weiss; Christina Weiss Lurie
- Website: stanleyweiss.net

Stanley A. Weiss (December 21, 1926 – August 26, 2021) was an American business executive, founder of Business Executives for National Security (BENS), and a writer on international affairs. He has been described as a "self-made man" and a "multi-faceted ... multi-movied bon vivant".

Inspired by the film The Treasure of the Sierra Madre to search for gold in Mexico in the 1950s, Weiss became a successful entrepreneur in the mining industry before turning to politics as co-founder of the Citizen's Party and founder of BENS, and anti-nuclear advocacy group that successfully campaigned for the closure of unnecessary U.S. military bases, reforming Pentagon procurement, passing the Chemical Weapons Convention, and catalyzing President Bill Clinton's 2000 visit to India.

Weiss started writing on national security issues in 1983 and has continued to write regularly on a wide range of foreign and domestic issues for titles including the International Herald Tribune, The New York Times, Foreign Affairs, and Strategic Affairs'. He wrote on international affairs for the Huffington Post.

His memoir Being Dead is Bad for Business was published by Disruption Books in February 2017.

== Early life and education ==
Weiss was born on December 21, 1926, in Philadelphia, Pennsylvania. His father worked in local Republican politics.

He joined the U.S. Army in January 1944, shortly after his seventeenth birthday, and was discharged with the rank of Sergeant in August, 1946. Weiss credited President Harry Truman's decision to use the atomic bomb with probably saving his life because he was training for the U.S. invasion of Japan when the war ended.

He attended Lehigh University, Virginia Polytechnic Institute, Pennsylvania Military College and the Georgetown University School of Foreign Service. He was also the Business Fellow at Harvard University's Center for International Affairs, now known as the Weatherhead Center for International Affairs.

== Business success ==
During his time as a Georgetown student in 1951, Weiss was inspired by the John Huston film The Treasure of the Sierra Madre to search for gold in Mexico.

Weiss had no experience in the mining business and struggled at first but developed his first key rule of business: Don't Die.

Although he never found gold, he found rich deposits of manganese ore, often braving dangerous or isolated conditions to secure new supplies. His business succeeded and Inc. Magazine described Weiss's 1977 book Manganese: The Other Uses as the "definitive text on the non-metallurgical uses of manganese".

Weiss diversified his businesses and in 1960, he founded American Minerals, Inc., of which he served as chairman until 1991. When the company merged with Premier Refractories, Inc., Weiss served as chairman of the merged entity until 1997. Along with partners Charley and John Gehret, Weiss also started Premier Magnesia, the largest domestic supplier of magnesia in the United States. In 2007, Premier Magnesia aligned with Giles Chemical, the largest supplier of Epsom salt in the Americas, and moved its headquarters to Waynesville, North Carolina where Giles had operated since 1954.

Working with entrepreneur Ara Oztemel, Weiss also played a role in fostering trade between the United States and Soviet Union at the height of the Cold War by cutting a deal to import Soviet chromium into the United States. The Soviet-American Trading Corporation was responsible for up to eighty percent of trade between the United States and the Soviet Union.

Weiss invested in Harman International Industries before it went public in 1986. He served on the company's board of directors for two decades.

Weiss had also invested in other companies, including Footprint Ventures – a venture capital fund based in India that is run by Silicon Valley venture capitalist Neill Brownstein and his wife, Linda – and Chicken Soup for the Soul Publishing, run by BENS member Bill Rouhana.

== Anti-nuclear activism ==
With the support of John Kenneth Galbraith, a liberal economist and Harvard professor, Weiss became the Business Fellow at Harvard University's Center for International Affairs for the 1977–1978 school year.

Based in part on his work on nuclear non-proliferation at Harvard, in 1982, Weiss founded Business Executives for National Security (BENS), a non-partisan organization that represents the perspective of business leaders on national security issues.

In a February 2, 1983, interview on the Today show, host Jane Pauley asked Weiss why senior business leaders were becoming vocal about issues pertaining to nuclear war. His reply later became his signature catchphrase: "Being dead is bad for business".

BENS initially focused largely on arms control and defense procurement. In a series of op-eds, Weiss drew attention to the dangers of nuclear proliferation and said The Pentagon was operating on outdated assessments of national security needs in justifying inefficient acquisitions and unnecessary bases. The Base Realignment and Closure (BRAC) Act of 1990, which helped remove pork barrel politics from the base-closing process by appointing a U.S. government commission to recommend closures, was based on a concept proposed by a BENS member. BENS also influenced the passage of the Chemical Weapons Convention and the Nunn-Lugar Cooperative Threat Reduction Program.

In 1994, a BENS report that twenty-six of the twenty-seven bases recommended for closure under the BRAC process remained open or had reopened with new federal tenants helped speed the bases' closures back. Weiss was invited to address the issue on CBS’ 60 Minutes, where he called the actions "political pork at its worst".

Through Weiss’ leadership, BENS supported the CIA’s In-Q-Tel program, a venture capital firm to develop promising national security technologies for the CIA. He also led efforts to design a public-private partnership called the New Jersey Business Force, which mobilized private corporations in natural disaster recovery efforts and was active in recovery efforts after Hurricane Sandy.

In 2007, Weiss stepped down as the Chairman of BENS and assumed the title of Founding Chairman. That year, Weiss received the Distinguished Civilian Service Award from the US Department of Defense.

== Political advocacy ==
After his Harvard fellowship, Weiss created and financed the Nuclear Information Resource Service (NIRS), which provided reliable, objective information about nuclear power. During the Three Mile Island disaster, NIRS was a key source of accurate information on the situation.

Weiss was a co-founder of the Citizen's Party, which was dissatisfied with the Carter administration and focused on economic democracy and solving the 1970s energy crisis. The Party recruited environmentalist Barry Commoner to run in the 1980 presidential election.

In 1991, Weiss became involved in a private sector-led, not-for-profit venture to reinvent America's public schools under President George H. W. Bush's "America 2000 Initiative"; the New American Schools Development Corporation sought to create new partnerships between business and government to improve US schools. Weiss and other members proposed "break-the-mold" designs for school reform. The ideas gained support within the Bush administration but failed due to opposition from the teachers’ unions.

== Writing and publishing career ==
Weiss nearly purchased the magazine Ramparts, which faced financial troubles in 1968.

Weiss had written op-eds on international affairs and national security issues since 1983. He had written as broadly and consistently on issues related to southeastern Asia and the Asian subcontinent the past 20 years – including Indonesia, Thailand, Myanmar, India – as any other American writer. Throughout the 1990s and 2000s, he was a regular op-ed contributor to the International Herald Tribune. His writing has also appeared in Foreign Affairs the Los Angeles Times, the Wall Street Journal, Forbes, the Washington Times, the Washington Post, UPI, Strategic Review, and the New York Times. He wrote about international affairs for The Huffington Post.

Key themes in Weiss's writings include the US leadership, economics, global business, and national borders. He described himself as "an internationalist who believes the world is better off when America is out in front".

Weiss had described Turkish President Recep Tayyip Erdoğan as a "brilliant fraud" whose actions run counter to Turkey's secular and democratic tradition, called on the US to reconsider its relationships with Saudi Arabia and Pakistan, and argued for a change in the US's approach to Myanmar.

In 1998, Weiss and BENS CEO Tom McInerney published an op-ed on the hunt for Osama bin Laden. The opening line stated "the United States wants terrorist mastermind Osama Bin Laden dead – or alive".

Former Indonesian president Megawati Sukarnoputri, during an election campaign against Susilo Bambang Yudhoyono, seized on a Yudhonoyo quote in a Weiss-written op-ed in International Herald Tribune to argue that Yudhoyono preferred the United States over Indonesia.

On February 28, 2017, Weiss’ memoir titled "Being Dead is Bad for Business" was published by Disruption Books.

== Film and theater production ==
Weiss was co-producer of Los Novios, the first musical comedy to debut in Mexico, which is based on the Broadway musical The Boy Friend. He was also a producer for a Mexican adaptation of The Bells Are Ringing titled Ring, Ring, Llame el Amor.

Weiss was the executive producer for The Hired Hand, a 1971 film starring Peter Fonda, and also appeared in it. He also appeared in the film.

== Associations ==
In Mexico, Weiss came to know several participants in Mexico's vibrant art world, including Lupe Rivera, the daughter of painters Diego Rivera and Frida Kahlo.

Weiss frequently visited 1960s San Francisco, home of the nascent counterculture movement. Weiss maintained close friendships with San Francisco journalists Herb Caen and Art Hoppe. Writers Barnaby Conrad and Herb Gold, advertising pioneers Walter Landor and Howard Gossage, as well as proctologist-turned-ventriloquist Gerry Feigen were among a group of friends who met regularly with Weiss at Trader Vic's. His closest friends were the entrepreneur Harry Hunt and attorney Bernard Petrie.

Weiss spent part of each year in Gstaad, Switzerland, where he befriended Galbraith, conservative National Review founder William F. Buckley, and The Spectator columnist Taki Theodoracopulos. Weiss also developed close friendships in Gstaad with actors Sean Connery and Roger Moore. He would later befriend Pierce Brosnan in Phuket, Thailand.

In 1971, Weiss and his family moved to London. He was a member of the Garrick Club and the Queen's tennis club.

Weiss received an honorary Doctor of Humane Letters from Point Park College. He was a member of the Council on Foreign Relations, the American Ditchley Foundation, and the International Institute for Strategic Studies.

Weiss had served on the Board of Visitors at Georgetown University's School of Foreign Service, the advisory board of the RAND Center for Middle East Public Policy, and the advisory board of the International Crisis Group.
