= General Cinema =

American movie theater chain

GC Companies, Inc.
- Final logo, designed by Joe Selame, used from 1985 to 2002
- Trade name: General Cinema (1986–2002)
- Formerly: Midwest Drive-In Theaters (1935–1960), General Drive-In Corporation (1960–1964); General Cinema Corporation (1964–1993)
- Traded as: NYSE: GCC
- Industry: Entertainment (movie theatres)
- Founded: 1935; 91 years ago
- Defunct: March 29, 2002; 24 years ago
- Fate: Chapter 11 reorganization, acquisition of residual assets
- Successor: AMC Theatres
- Headquarters: 27 Boylston Street, Chestnut Hill, MA
- Number of locations: 130 (September 2000); 77 (November 2000); 66 (2002)
- Key people: Philip Smith (founder); Richard A. Smith
- Owner: Harcourt General (1993)
- Subsidiaries: General Cinema Theatres, Inc.; Hoyts General Cinema South America, Inc.

General Cinema Corporation, also known as General Cinema, GCC, or General Cinema Theaters, was an American movie theater chain. At its peak, the company operated about 1,500 screens, some of which were among the first theaters certified by THX (A division of Lucasfilm Ltd.). The company operated for approximately 67 years, from 1935 until 2002.

== History ==
=== Early history ===
General Cinema Corporation was founded as a drive-in theater in 1935 by Philip Smith, who had previously owned a small chain of silent film theaters. Smith had chosen to open the chain after noticing the increasing sales of local Massachusetts theaters, and the introduction of films that were able to accommodate a synchronized sound and voice track into their reels. Originally, Smith planned to open indoor theaters, but had decided to open a small number of outdoor theaters instead (later deciding to add indoor theaters). The company saw limited growth until 1939, when growth began as World War II started, and with it, the emergence of Newsreel news presented with the feature films.

=== Post-war growth and diversification ===
After the war ended, the company was newly led by Richard A. Smith, who had decided on pushing the company towards indoor movie theaters in future expansion, and opened the country's first shopping-center theater in 1951 at Shoppers World, in Framingham, Massachusetts. Starting in the 1960s, General Cinema diversified into other businesses. At times they owned the department store Neiman Marcus, the publisher Harcourt Brace, radio stations in several major markets (notably WEFM in Chicago, KRBE in Houston, WZGC in Atlanta, WGCL in Cleveland, and WIFI in Philadelphia), and TV station WCIX in Miami. For a time General Cinema was Pepsi-Cola's largest bottler and also distributed 7-Up, Dr Pepper, and other soft drink brands. In 1998, they also formed a joint venture theater chain with Hoyts, known as Hoyts General Cinema, that had locations throughout South America.

==== Foray into film production ====
In 1976, the company collaborated with Lew Grade's Associated Communications Corporation to form Associated General Films, which produced films including Voyage of the Damned and Capricorn One; the partnership ended the following year and ATV's ITC Entertainment subsidiary started financing films on its own.

=== Brand development ===
In 1986, General Cinema officially collaborated with Industrial Light & Magic (ILM) to create the first of a new series of policy trailers. In 1992, the company collaborated with Lucasfilm Ltd. to create new mascots for the company. Within less than a year, the then-iconic Candy Band was created; soon after, two more mascots were developed and named Popcorn Bob, and Pepsi Sue, three developments that were used in pre-show reels from 1993 to 2002. In 1993, its holding company, by then named Harcourt General, spun-off General Cinema as a separate company.

=== Company closing ===
After competition forced the closure of a number of General Cinema locations, General Cinema filed for Chapter 11 bankruptcy on October 11, 2000, with accompanying resignation of Richard A. Smith and a further employed Smith family member. On December 7, 2001, AMC Theatres agreed to buy GC Companies, Inc. as part of GC's Chapter 11 reorganization plan, an acquisition completed on March 29, 2002. With the acquisition, the Credits loyalty program merged into the MovieWatcher network.

The General Cinema Corp. trademark was placed up for auction on December 8, 2010. In December 2011, this trademark was published for opposition by JTE Multimedia. On March 11, 2014, the USPTO declared the trademark "General Cinema" abandoned.
