= Irving Kolodin =

American music critic

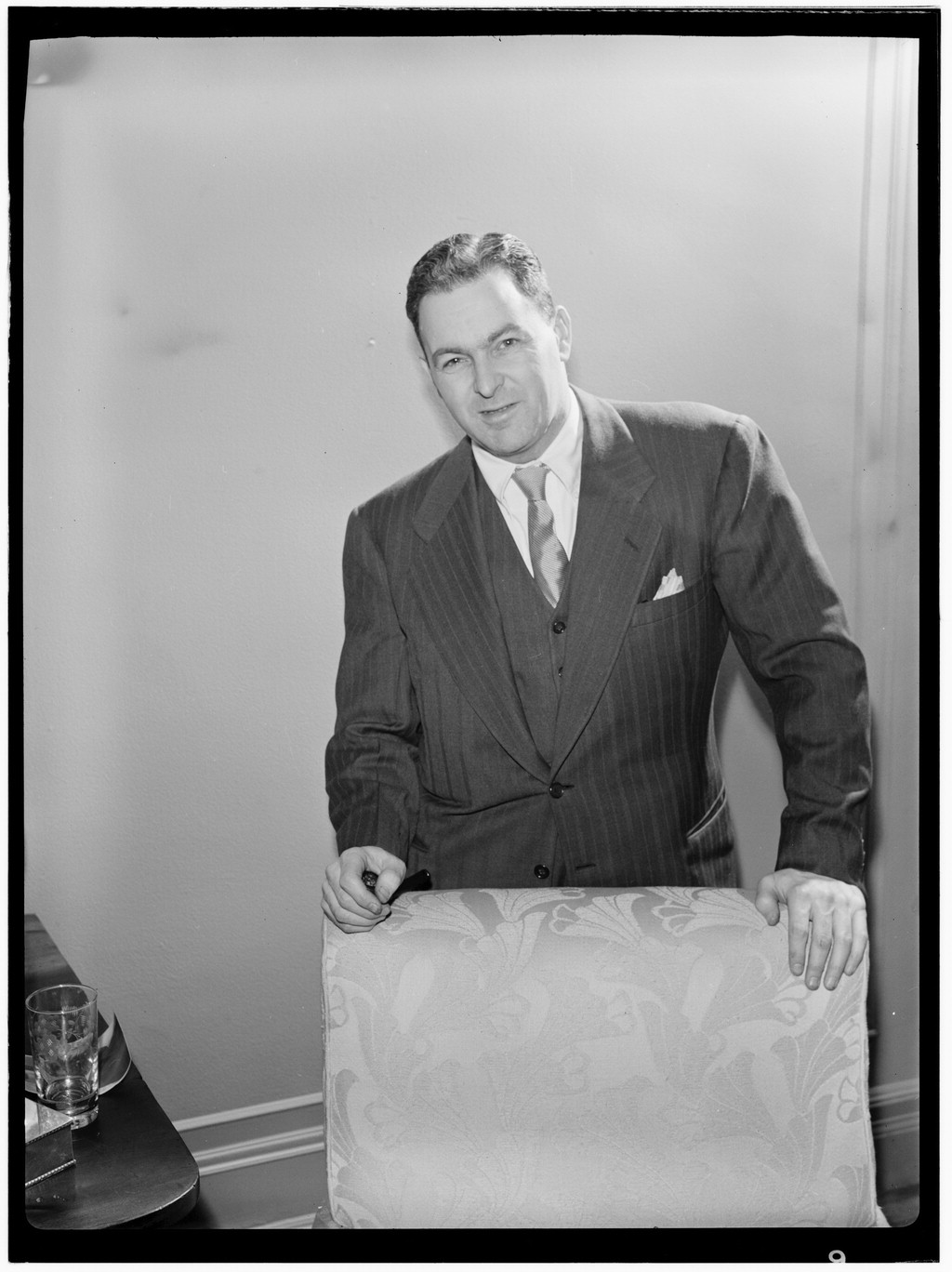

Irving Kolodin (February 21, 1908 – April 29, 1988) was an American music critic and music historian.

== Biography ==
Irving Kolodin was born in New York City, New York. He wrote for the New York Sun from 1932 to 1950 and for the Saturday Review starting in 1947. He was best known for his popular Guide to Recorded Music. He also wrote program notes for the New York Philharmonic and Metropolitan Opera, and a 762-page "candid history" of the Met up to 1966. He was married to Irma (née Levy) Zeckendorf, former wife of real estate developer William Zeckendorf.
