= Howard Gossage =

American advertising innovator (1917–1969)

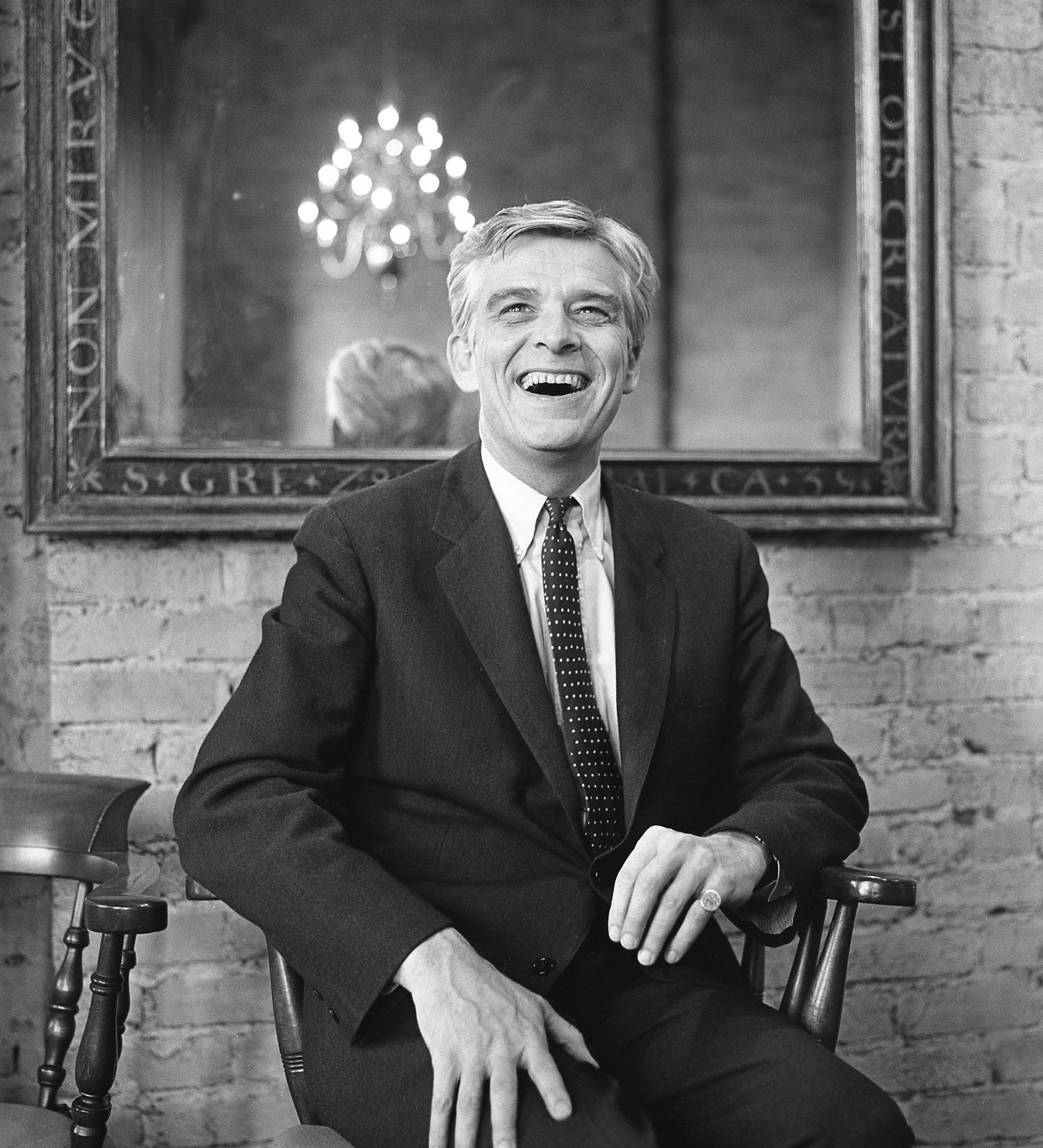
Howard Gossage portrait, mid 1960s

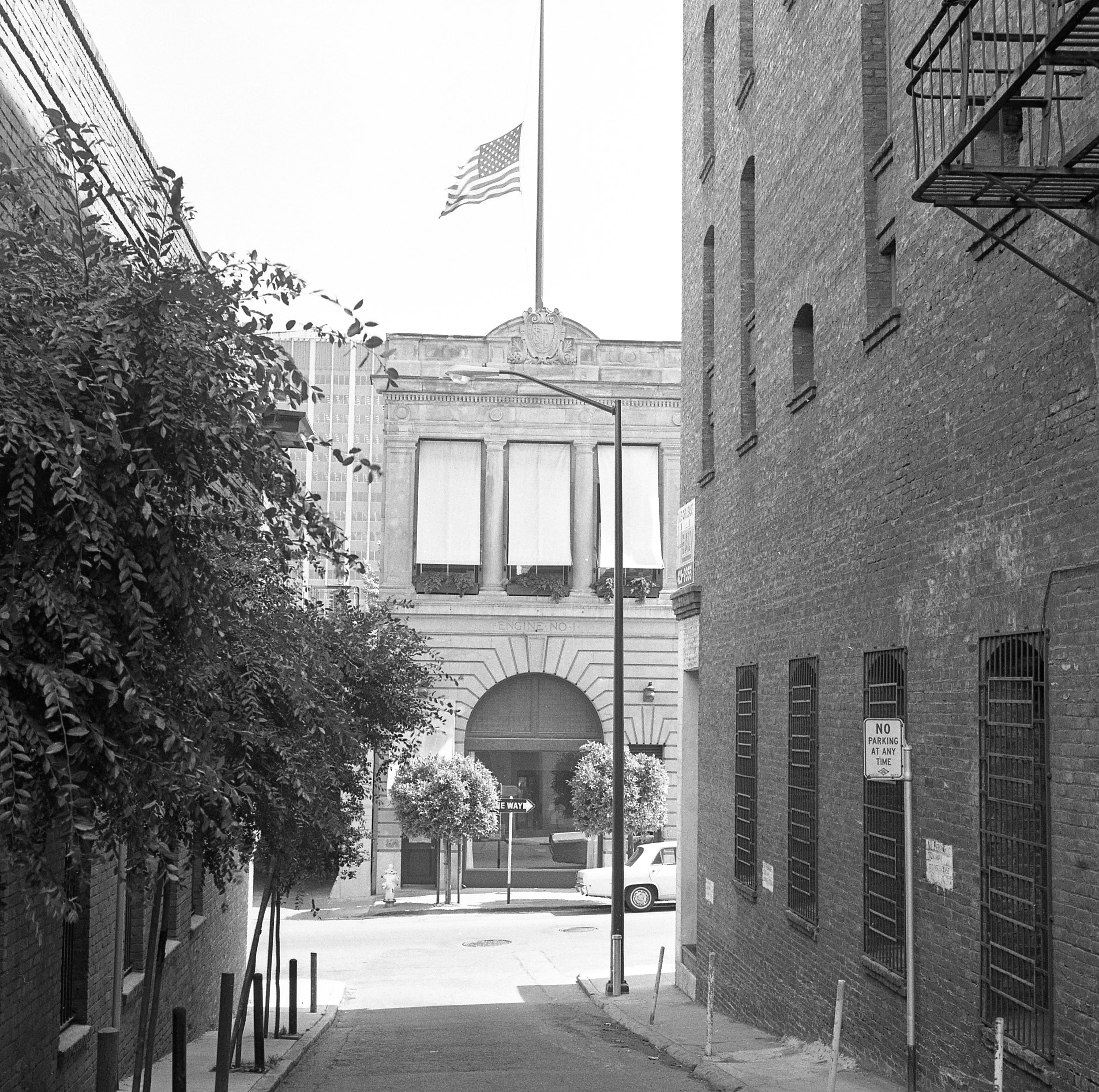
Engine Company No. 1, near Barbary Coast, San Francisco)

Howard Luck Gossage (1917–1969) was an American advertising executive, known for his iconoclasm and nicknamed "The Socrates of San Francisco".

== Early life ==
Gossage was born in Chicago. He and another paddled a canoe for 1500 miles along the Mississippi river. Gossage was educated at the University of Kansas City. In World War II, Gossage was a Navy combat pilot.

== Career ==
Circa 1953, Gossage's first advertising job, at age 36, was in San Francisco. Gossage first worked at "big agencies".

Circa 1953, the first agency to bear his name was Weiner & Gossage, later, Freeman & Gossage then Freeman, Mander & Gossage.

His ad agency, in an old firehouse (Engine Company No. 1, 451 Pacific Ave., east of the International Settlement, in the Barbary Coast, San Francisco), existed for 12 years, from 1957, until 1969, soon after his death. The building became a salon where some of the era's notable wits congregated, including John Steinbeck, Buckminster Fuller, Tom Wolfe, Stan Freberg, Herb Caen, Marshall McLuhan, and Jessica Mitford from John Steinbeck to Buckminster Fuller, Terry-Thomas, Tom Wolfe to Stan Freberg.

Gossage...would call Herb up every day at 11:45 a.m....and, recalls Hinckle, "would say in his magnificent stutter...

A non-conformist, "he turned down or resigned business in order to keep the number of staff to below 13" and who railed against the norms of so-called scientific advertising in his day, Gossage introduced several innovative techniques to the advertising practice that would only become appreciated decades after his death.

Tom Wolfe credits Gossage with discovering the media theorist Marshall McLuhan, introducing him to media and corporate leaders thereby providing McLuhan his entry into mainstream renown. More widely, Gossage was involved in some of the first environmental campaigning in the USA with the Sierra Club, and in the establishment of Friends of the Earth through his friendship with David Brower.

Howard Gossage hated Smokey the Bear.

Howard Gossage is listed by Advertising Age at number 23 of its 100 advertising people of the 20th century. AdAge.com calls Gossage a "copywriter who influenced ad-makers worldwide."

Gossage believed that commercial communication worked best when it was fun, irreverent and entertaining, using humour, intrigue and sometimes outrage to win his audience's attention, affection - and custom.

Gossage commissioned a memorial plaque to Miles Archer, the partner of Sam Spade in The Maltese Falcon, who died in Burritt Alley above Stockton Street, prior to the Stockton Street Tunnel, in San Francisco. Terry McDonell, and others, at night, illegally stuck the plaque to a building wall, with Hunter Thompson acting as the lookout for police. The next night (February 12, 1974) they came back with the Nibbi Brothers (construction contractor Marino Nibbi) to assist in properly securing the plaque.

"On approximately this spot, Miles Archer, Partner of Sam Spade, was done in by Brigid O’Shaughnessy"

== Personal life ==
He had children by his wife, (née Fox), including Page June (1947-1965). He had two children, Amy and Ebon, by his wife, Mary Jane (née Baty) Gossage (1930-1974), the daughter of a wealthy Illinois banking family. In 1975, Ebon killed Amy. In 1962, he married his second wife, Sally Kemp. They had a daughter, Sarah Luck. He died of leukemia.

== Quotes ==
He is known for many outspoken comments on the advertising world:

Advertising accomplishes some things, but it doesn't accomplish all that much. I think it's obvious that you can't have more and more of the stuff.

Repetitive advertising is not indoctrination so much as brain washing. There is ample evidence that when this method works well it is like shooting fish in a barrel. This is ok outside of the petty objection that even if people are fish, it isn't sporting to shoot them in a barrel. Except the fish don't hold still the way they used to, they've developed thicker skins, it takes more ammunition all the time.

I wrote a magazine article for Harpers last year, and in it I said specifically this: I like outdoor advertising; I just don't think it ought to be outdoors.

To explain morality to an adman is like trying to explain to a child that sex is more interesting than ice cream.

If you're stuck with a lemon, make lemonade. (see: When life gives you lemons, make lemonade)

== Ad campaigns ==
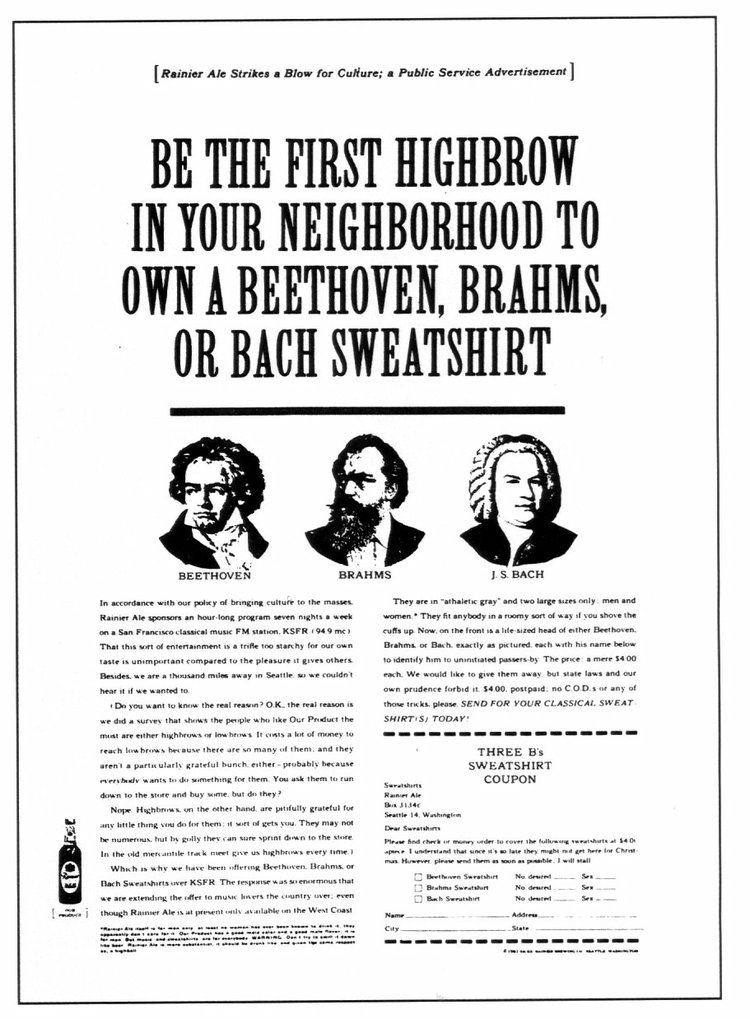
Beethoven Sweatshirt offer, promoting KSFR and Rainier Ale

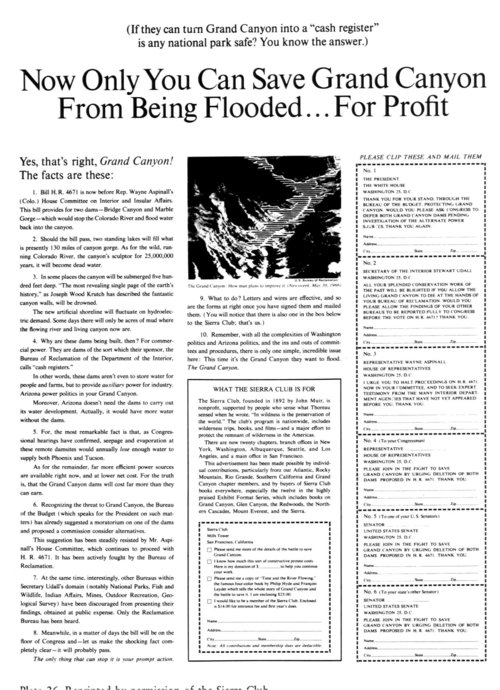
Grand Canyon environmental policy campaign for Sierra Club

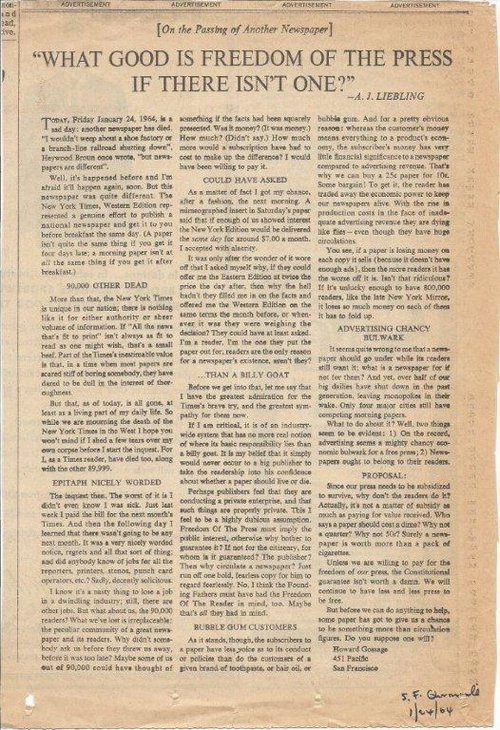
Freedom of the Press - Advertisement/Opinion piece

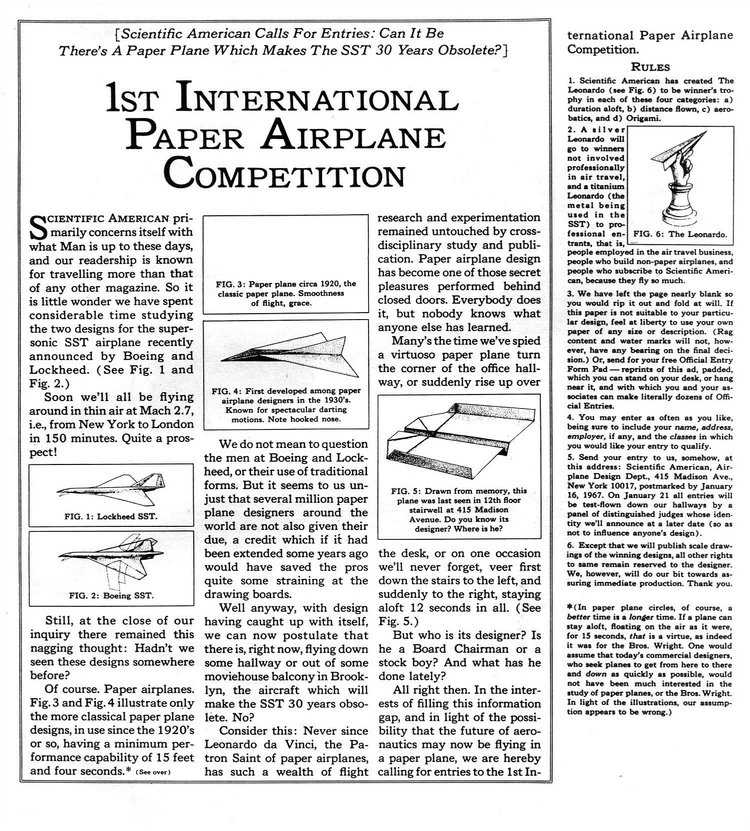
Scientific American's Paper Airplane Contest campaign, a solicitation for airline advertising

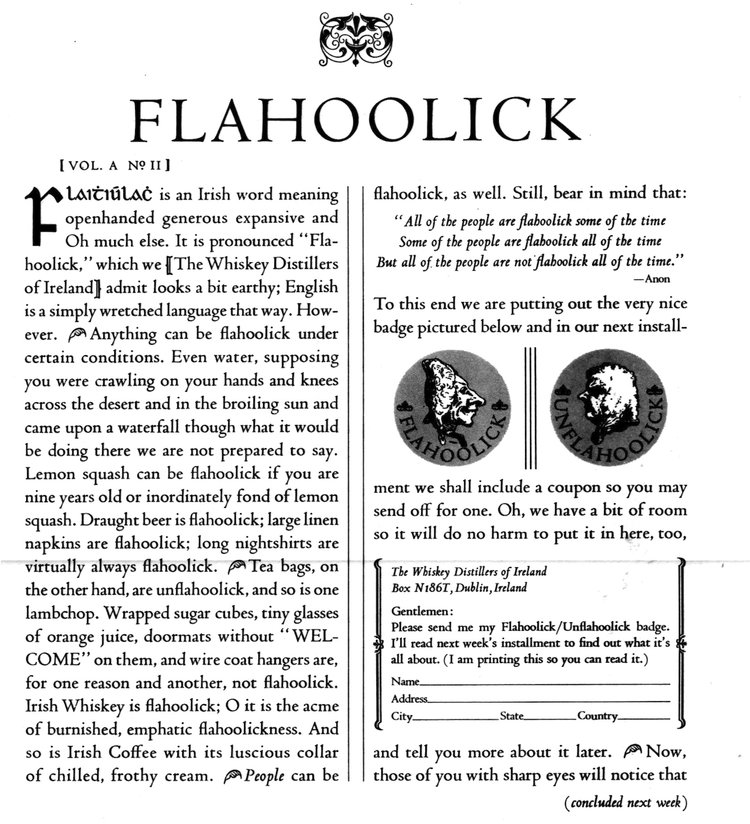
Whiskey Distillers of Ireland, published the New Yorker, the first ad, of a series which introduced the word FLAHOOLICK.

== Works ==
In February 1960, Gossage published How to look at billboards in Harper's Magazine.

In March 1961, Gossage published The Golden Twig — Black, White, and Pango Peach Magic in Advertising in Harper's Magazine.

In 1962, S. Miller Harris, head of Eagle Shirtmakers, and Howard Luck Gossage published "Dear Miss Afflerbach: Or, The Postman Hardly Ever Rings 11,342 Times".

In 1967, Ist die Werbung noch zu retten a compilation of Howard Gossage's articles and speeches edited by Barrows Mussey was published in West Germany. Republished by Dominik Imseng, 2017.

In 1967, Jerry Mander, George Dippel, and Gossage published The Great International Paper Airplane Book.

Gossage, Howard Luck (September 1969). "Tell Me, Doctor, Will I Be Active Right Up to the Last?". The Atlantic.

In 1986, a compilation of Howard Gossage's articles and speeches was edited by Kim B. Rotzoll, Jarleth Graham and Barrows Mussey, and published in the US as Is There Any Hope for Advertising?

== Works about Gossage ==
Hinckle, Warren (March 1974). "The Adman Who Hated Advertising: The Gospel According to Howard Gossage". The Atlantic.

In 1974, Warren Hinckle wrote If You Have a Lemon, Make Lemonade.

Rotzoll, Kim B. (December 1980). "Gossage Revisited: Reflections of Advertising's Legendary Iconoclast". Journal of Advertising. 9 (4): 6–42. doi:10.1080/00913367.1980.10673332 – via ResearchGate.

In 1984, Herb Caen and Jessica Mitford contributed to An Extraordinary Man.

Bruce H. Bendinger compiled The Book of Gossage in 2005, bringing together Howard's work, writing and contributions by Jeff Goodby, Stan Freberg, Barrows Mussey & Alice Lowe.

In 2012 Creative Director Steve Harrison authored a biography about Howard Gossage entitled Changing the world is the only fit work for a grown man.

In 2023, TellTale Industries with Ashley Pollak & James King were commissioned to produce a radio documentary about Howard Gossage for BBC Radio 4 called The Socrates of San Francisco.' The programme was broadcast on the 20th May 2023, and is available for streaming and download

In 2023, The Firehouse Salon with hosts Sarah Luck Gossage and Ashley Pollak & James King, is a podcast which looks at the themes of Howard's life in greater detail and explores how that thinking is relevant today in the fields of environmentalism, economics, politics and communication.

David Dye & Steve Harrison published The Howard Gossage Show - And What it Can Teach You About Advertising, Fun, Fame and Manipulating the Media. in 2024 which shares previously unseen advertisements produced by Howard's agency.

== See also ==
- Adbusters
- Jeff Goodby
- Goodby, Silverstein & Partners
- Jerry Della Femina
- Harold Sumption
- Herb Alpert's Ninth
