= National Theatre (Boston, 1911) =

Coordinates: 42°20′41.15″N 71°4′15.63″W

The National Theatre (1911–1978) of Boston, Massachusetts, was a 3,500-seat multipurpose auditorium on Tremont Street in the South End. It functioned as a cinema, lecture hall, and stage. Performers included Jehovah's Witness founder Joseph F. Rutherford and "big-name entertainers like Duke Ellington and Ray Bolger." Movie screenings included The Battle of Gettysburg in 1913. The English High School held graduation exercises in the National. Around 1919 it was known as the "Waldorf Theater." In 1992, it was purchased by Philip Smith.

The space operated "intermittently after World War II for plays and movies." Among the audience members: clothing designer Joseph Abboud. The National closed in 1978. The Boston Center for the Arts oversaw the property thereafter, when it was subject to numerous plans for redevelopment. The building existed until 1997, when it was demolished.

== Images ==
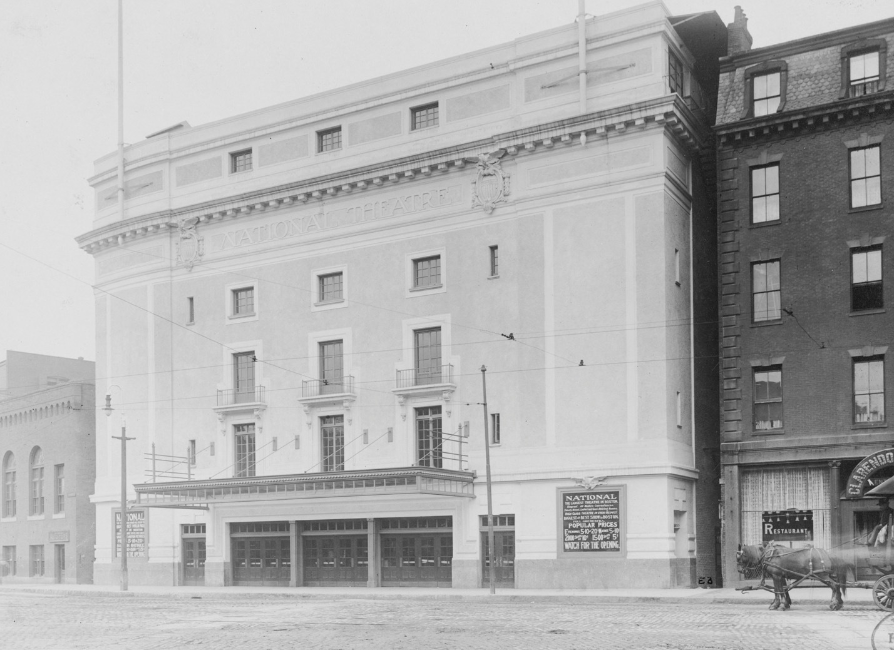
National Theatre, Tremont St. (near Berkeley St.), Boston, 1911 (photo courtesy Boston Public Library)

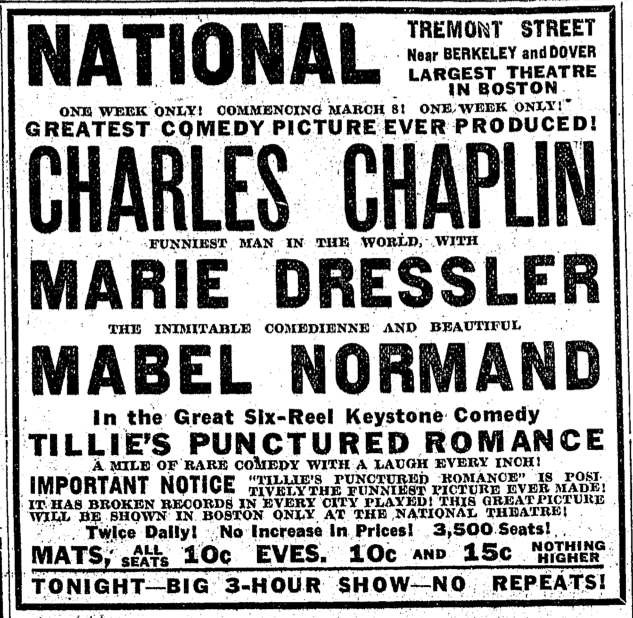
Advertisement for Tillie's Punctured Romance, with Charlie Chaplin, 1915

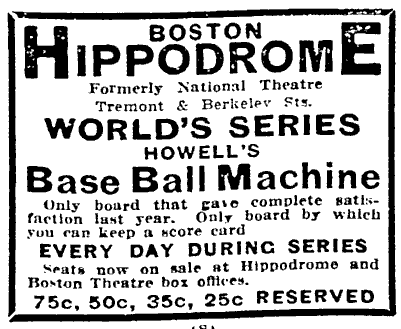
Advertisement for "base ball machine" at the Hippodrome (i.e. National), 1915

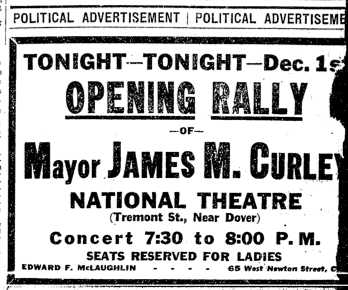
James Curley election campaign rally, 1917

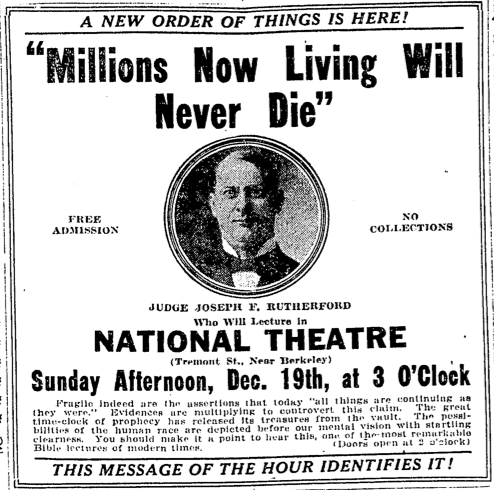
Advertisement for Rutherford at the National, 1920
