= Philip Smith (theater owner) =

American businessman

- Born: May 10, 1899; New York City, U.S.
- Died: July 13, 1961 (aged 62)
- Occupation: Businessman
- Known for: Founder of Midwest Drive-In Theaters
- Spouse: Marian Cohn
- Children: Richard Allan Smith; Nancy Smith Lurie
- Relatives: Jeffrey Lurie (grandson)

Philip Smith (May 10, 1899 – July 13, 1961) was an American businessman and founder of Midwest Drive-In Theaters (which later became General Drive-In Corporation and then General Cinema) who was one of the largest operators of drive-in movie theaters in the United States.

== Biography ==
Smith worked as a Pathé Frères salesman. In 1922, he purchased the National Theatre restoring it to profitability by reducing ticket prices from 25 cents to 10 cents. Smith named his new company Philip Smith Theatrical Enterprises in Boston and expanded by purchasing smaller theaters throughout New England. His portfolio reached about 25 theaters until the Great Depression hit when he was forced to slowly sell nearly all his theaters to support his family (he only kept three). In 1935, in order to benefit from the increase in automobile ownership, he took a risk and opened drive-in theaters in Cleveland and Detroit; and by the time World War II started, he operated nine of the 15 drive-in theaters in the United States. At his drive-ins, children entered free and there were playgrounds to help make it a family friendly event. His investment paid off grandly during the post-war boom. In 1946, his son Richard Alan Smith joined the company. In 1947, he was one of the first to open a theater in a shopping mall in Framingham, Massachusetts. By the 1950s, the Midwest Drive-In Theatres operated 53 drive-ins; and he branched out into other lines of business including the Richard's Drive-Ins restaurant chain, Amy Joe's Pancake Houses, and several bowling alleys in order to diversify his revenues which were under pressure as more people stayed home to watch television. In 1960, the company changed its name to General Drive-In Corp and went public on the New York Stock Exchange although Smith retained a controlling interest. Smith died in 1961 and his son succeeded him as CEO; his son changed the name to General Cinema in 1964.

Smith is considered one of the fathers of Jewish philanthropy in Boston during the 1940s when he joined Combined Jewish Philanthropies of Boston in assisting Jewish immigrants, resettling refugees, and helping to establish Israel.
