= JTE Multimedia =

JTE Multimedia, LLC is a publishing company located in Conshohocken, Pennsylvania that was founded in 2007. It publishes three peer-reviewed medical journals: Hospital Practice, Postgraduate Medicine, and The Physician and Sportsmedicine. Additionally, JTE Multimedia relaunched the defunct Collier's Weekly and Saturday Review in 2011.

JTE Multimedia's content is available in print, on the web, and in eReader format. All of JTE Multimedia's print publications are brought out under American Brands.
