= List of people from Los Angeles =

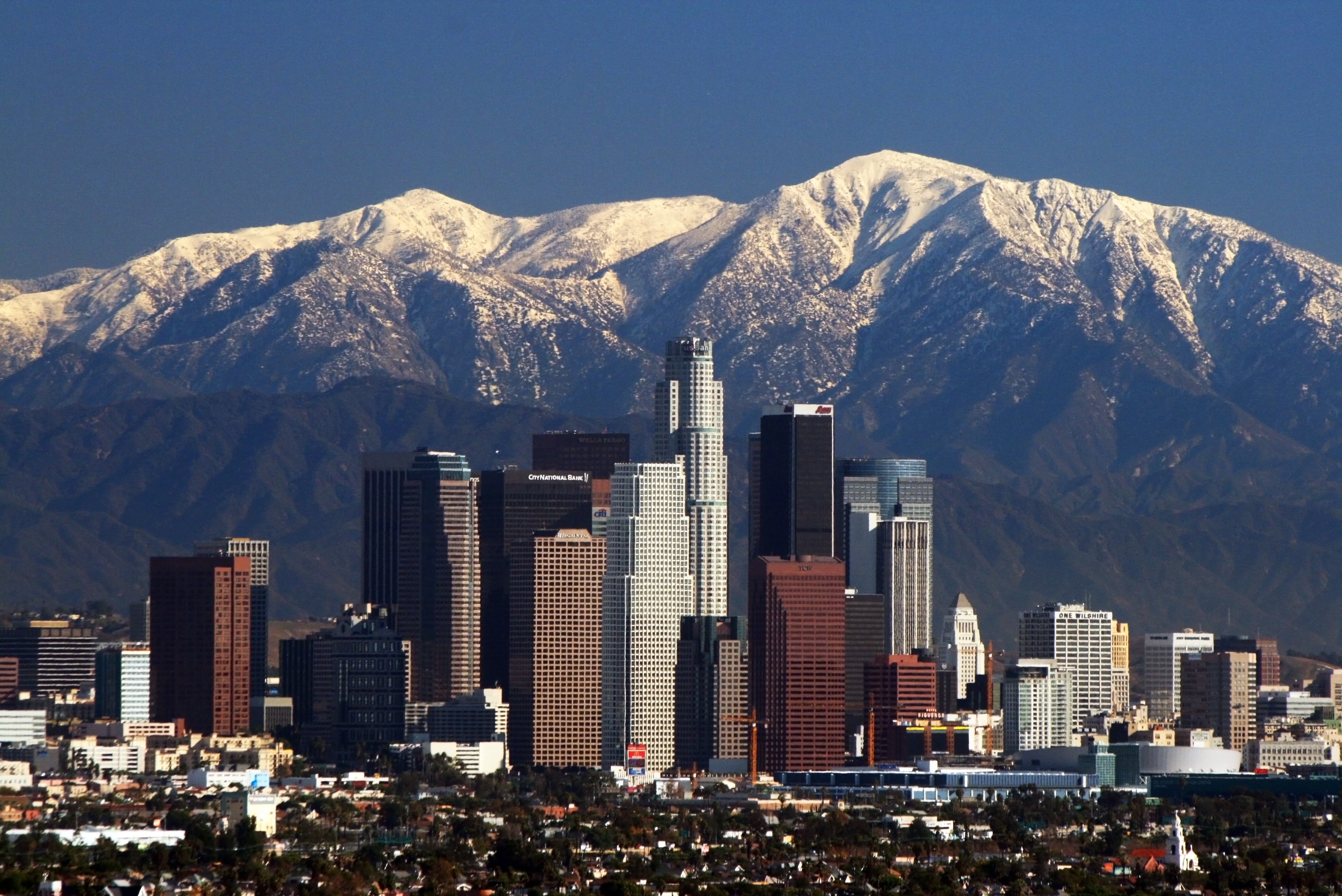
Los Angeles skyline

The following is a list of notable people who were either born in, lived in, are current residents of, or are otherwise closely associated with the city or county of Los Angeles, California. Those not born in Los Angeles have their places of birth listed instead. Los Angeles natives are also referred to as Angelenos /ˌændʒɪˈliːnoʊz/ AN-jə-LEE-nohz.

== A ==
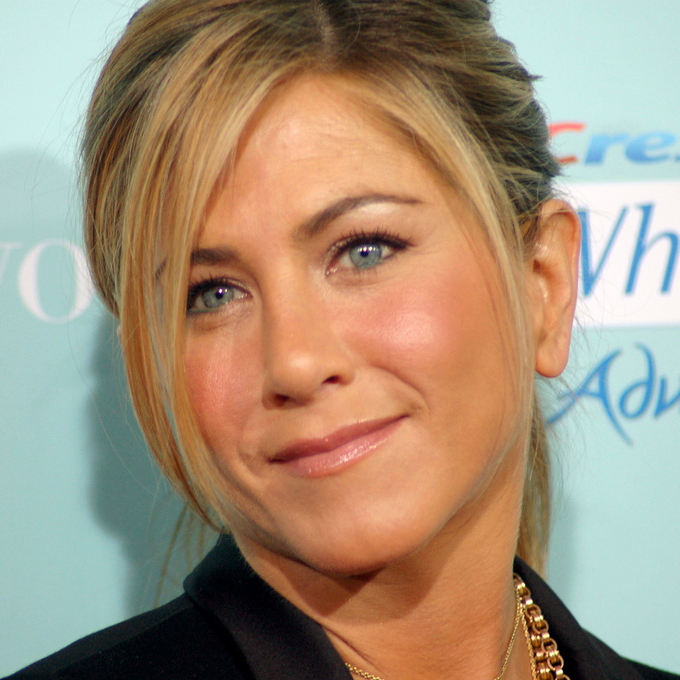
Jennifer Aniston

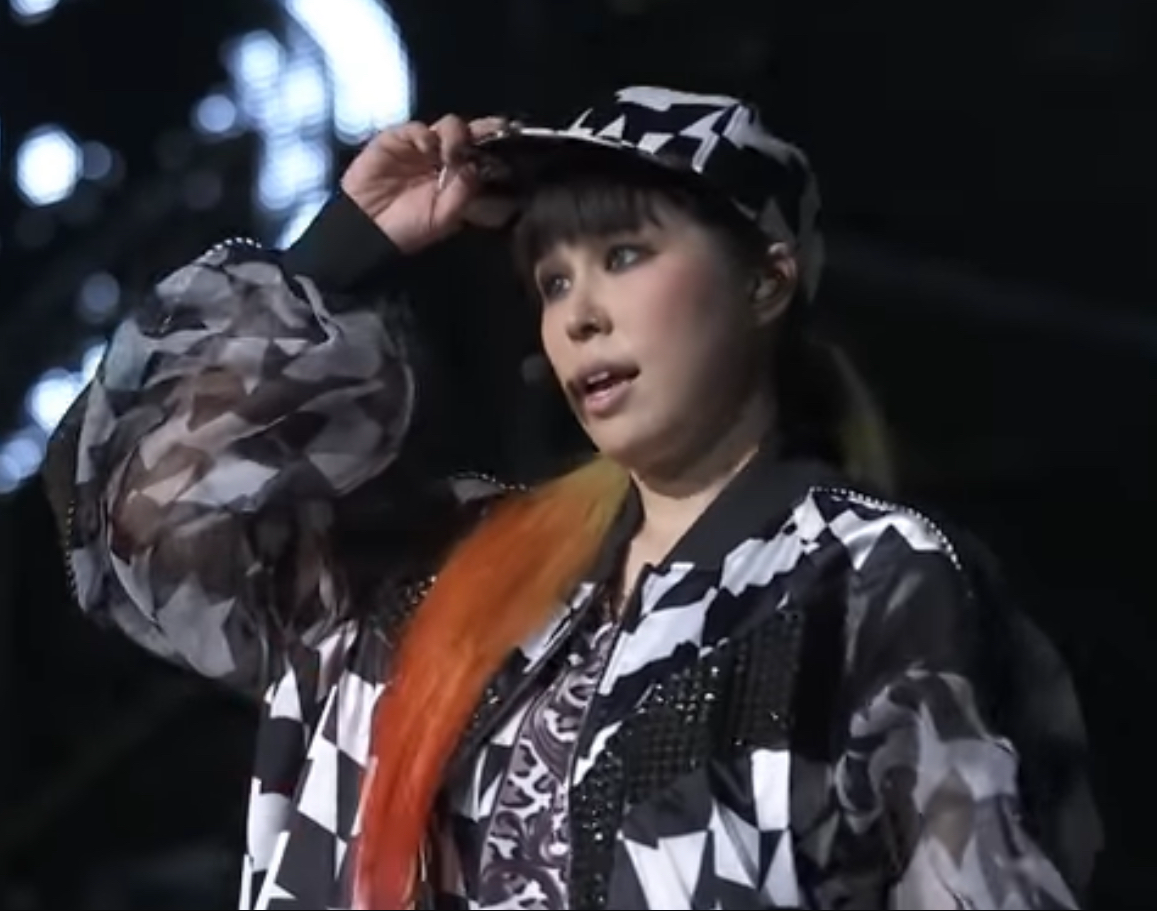
Ai

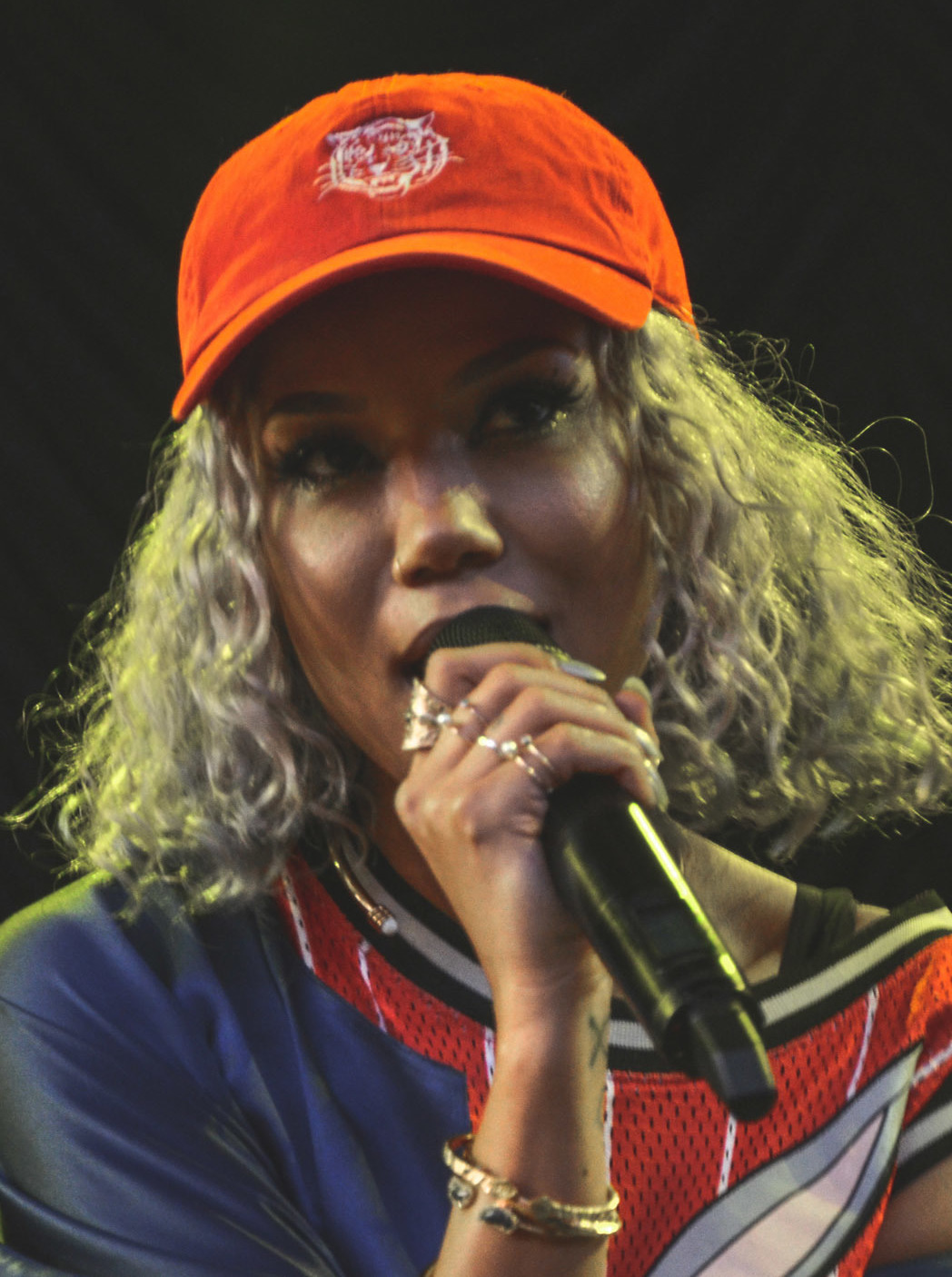
Jhené Aiko

- Marguerite Elizabeth Abbott (1870–1953) – painter, teacher
- Kareem Abdul-Jabbar (born 1947) – basketball player with UCLA and the Los Angeles Lakers (originally from Harlem, New York City)
- Thandiwe Abdullah – civic activist
- George O. Abell (1927–1983) – astronomer, professor, University of California, Los Angeles
- Alon Abutbul – Israeli actor
- Millicent Borges Accardi – poet and recipient of a National Endowment for the Arts fellowship (born in Long Beach)
- Forrest J Ackerman (1916–2008) – collector and influential science fiction fan
- Carol Adams (1918–2012) – silent-film actress
- Patrick J. Adams (born 1981) – actor, director, photographer (born in Toronto)
- J. A. Adande – sports journalist
- Ivy Adara (born 1987) – Australian singer and composer (originally from Australia)
- Arron Afflalo (born 1985) – NBA player for the Orlando Magic
- Ben Affleck (born 1972) – actor and director (born in Berkeley)
- Ralph Ahn (1926–2022) – actor
- Ai (born 1981) – Japanese-American singer-songwriter and rapper
- Jhené Aiko (born 1988) – singer-songwriter
- John Aiso (1909–1978) – lawyer, jurist
- Jessica Alba (born 1981) – actress and businesswoman
- Merrill K. Albert (1923–2011) – trial lawyer and author
- Gary Alexander (born 1953) – professional baseball player
- Karen Alexander – singer
- Sasha Alexander (born 1973) – producer/actress
- Gene Allen (1918–2015) – art director
- Gloria Allred (born 1941) – attorney (originally from Philadelphia, Pennsylvania)
- Francia Almendárez (born 1988) – actress
- Herb Alpert (born 1935) – musician, composer, producer
- Alejandro Alvarado Jr. (born 2003) – soccer player
- Carlos Alvarez (born 1990) – soccer player
- Andrea Anderson (born 1977) – athlete, Olympic gold medalist
- Anthony Anderson (born 1970) – actor, comedian
- Billy Anderson (born 1929) – NFL player
- Ever Anderson (born 2007) – actress and model
- Garret Anderson (born 1972) – professional baseball player
- Paul Thomas Anderson (born 1970) – screenwriter, film director
- Ariane Andrew (born 1987) – wrestler, valet for World Wrestling Entertainment
- Mike Andrews (born 1943) – baseball player
- Andy – Iranian-Armenian singer (originally from Khorramdarreh, Khorramdarreh County, Zanjan Province, Iran)
- Angelyne (born 1950) – celebrity (originally from Poland)
- Jennifer Aniston (born 1969) – actress
- Julia Ann (born 1969) – pornographic actress and feature dancer
- Odette Annable (born 1985) – actress and model (moved to Austin, Texas)
- Shiri Appleby (born 1978) – actress
- Christina Applegate (born 1971) – actress
- Anne Archer (born 1947) – actress
- Army Archerd (1922–2009) – columnist for Variety (originally from Bronx, New York City)
- Krystina Arielle (born 1986) – actress and cosplayer (originally from Georgia)
- Desi Arnaz Jr. (born 1953) – actor, musician
- Lucie Arnaz (born 1951) – actress, singer
- Eder Arreola (born 1991) – soccer player
- Genevieve Artadi (born 1982) – musician and singer-songwriter
- Emmett Ashford (1914–1980) – baseball umpire
- Nnamdi Asomugha (born 1981) – professional football player for the Oakland Raiders
- Fred Astaire (1899–1987) – dancer and actor, The Band Wagon, Funny Face, That's Entertainment!
- Angus Sutherland (born 1982) – actor, producer
- Mackenzie Astin (born 1973) – actor
- Sean Astin (born 1971) – actor (born in Santa Monica)
- Milo Aukerman (born 1963) – singer with LA band Descendents
- Gene Autry (1907–1998) – singer, actor, L.A. museum and baseball team owner (born in Texas)
- Brian Avery (born 1940) – actor
- Dennis Awtrey (born 1948) – professional basketball player
- Roy Ayers (1940–2025) – funk, soul, and jazz composer and vibraphone player
- Iggy Azalea (born 1990) – Australian rapper (originally from Sydney, Australia)

== B ==
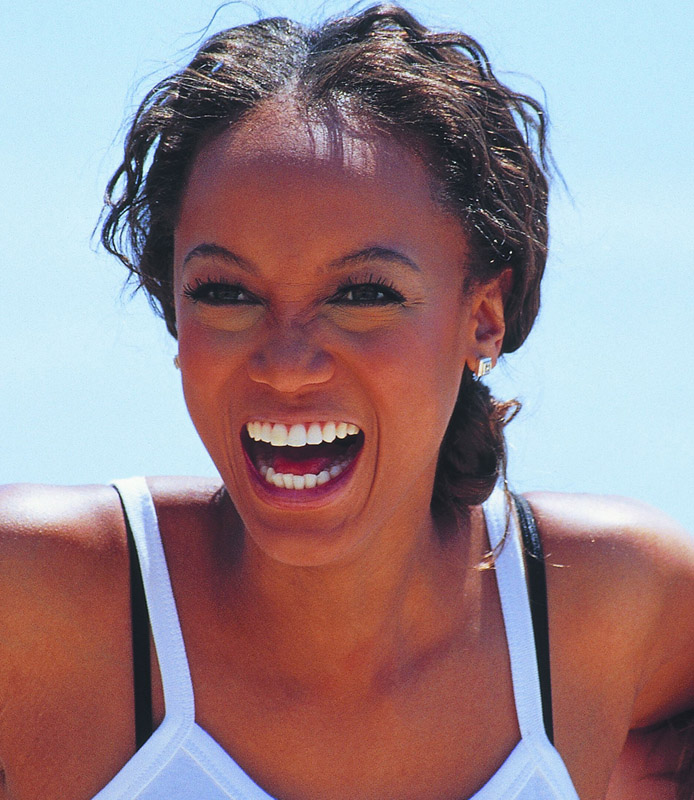
Tyra Banks

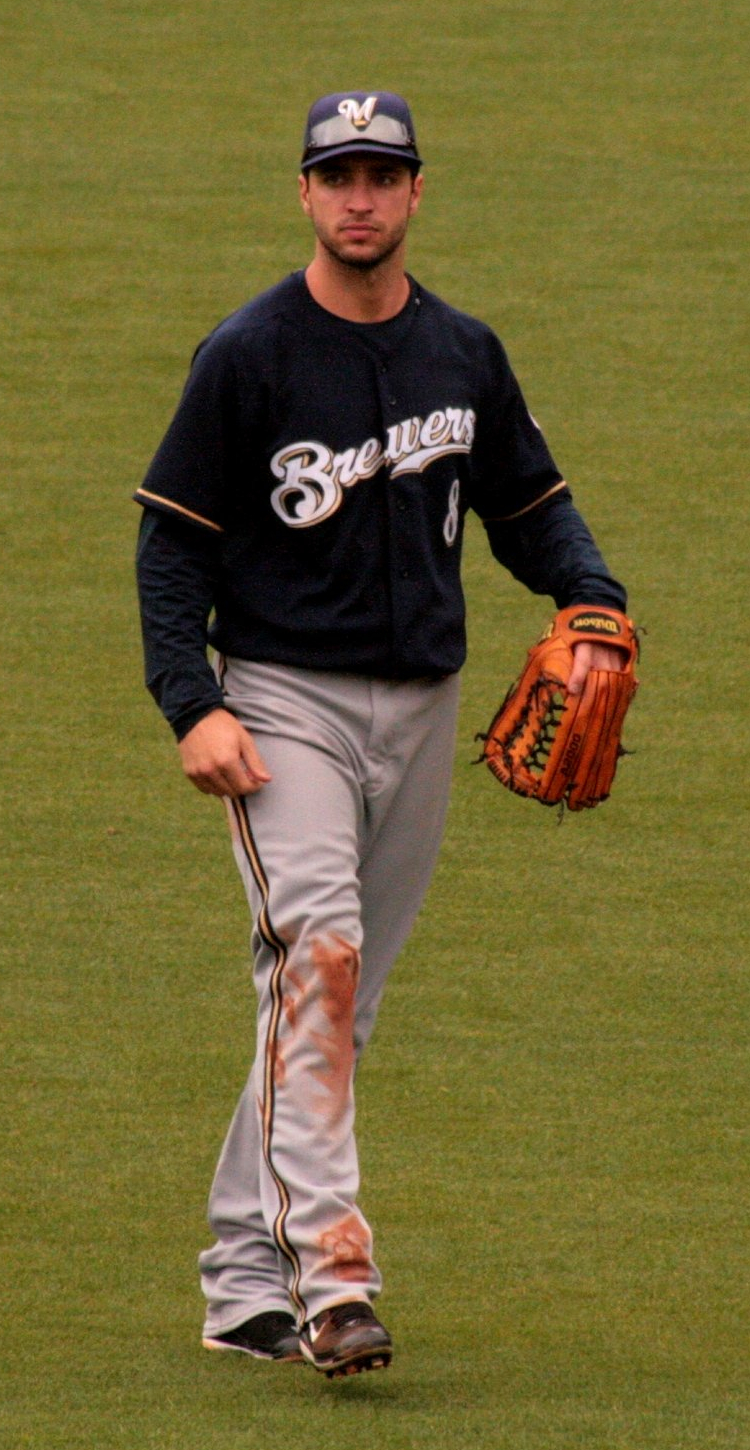
Ryan Braun

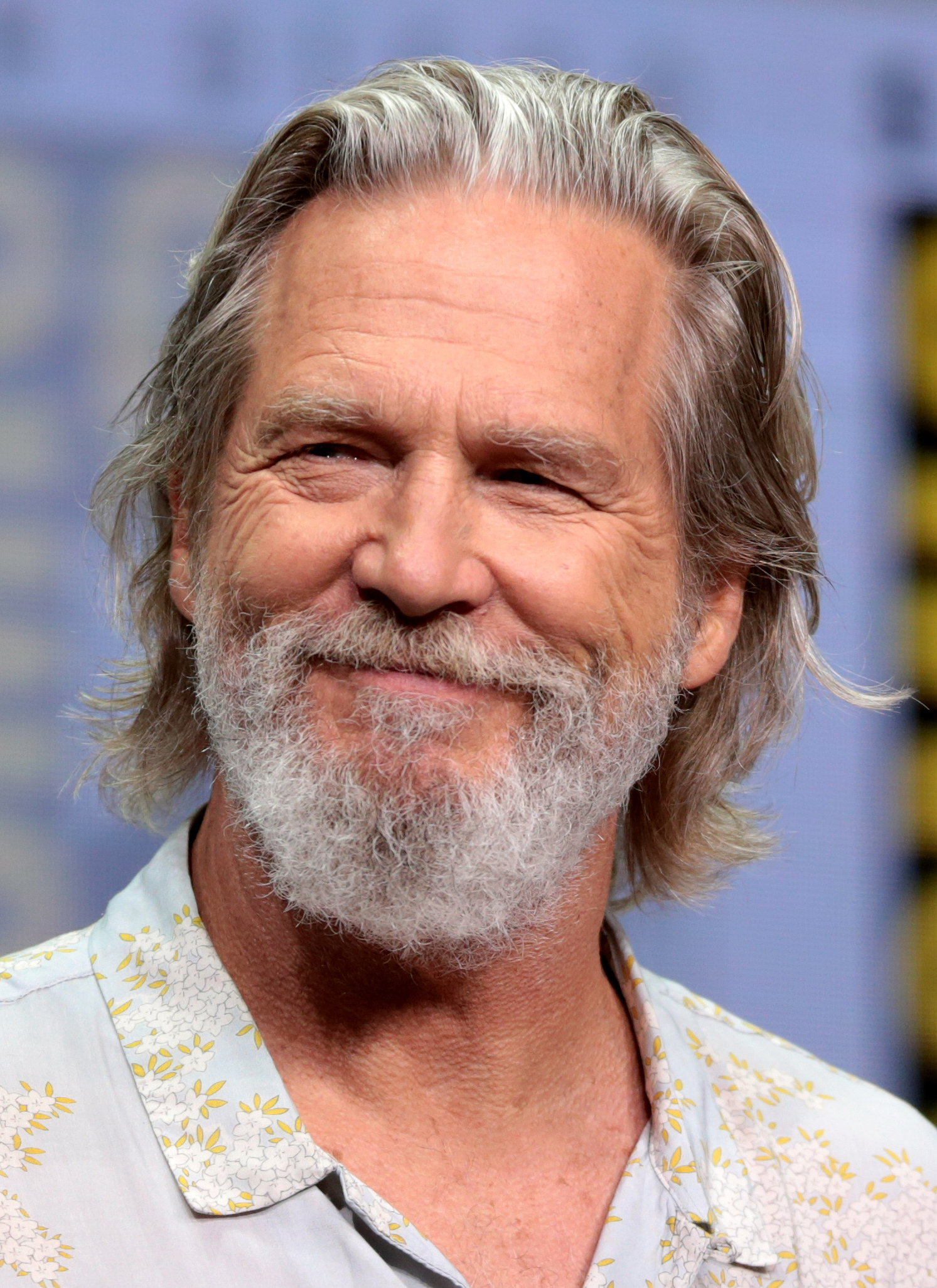
Jeff Bridges

- B-Real (born 1970) – rapper
- Judy Baca (born 1946) – muralist
- Michael Bacall (born 1973) – actor, screenwriter
- Fay Bainter (1893–1968) – actress
- Justin Baldoni (born 1984) – actor
- Ireland Baldwin (born 1995) – model
- Christian Bale (born 1974) – actor (originally from Haverfordwest, Wales)
- Art Balinger (1915–2011) – actor
- LaVar Ball (born 1967) – retired basketball and football player; father of Lonzo, Liangelo, and LaMelo Ball; owner of Big Baller Brand
- Lonzo Ball (born 1997) – NBA player for the Chicago Bulls
- Alex Band (born 1981) – singer, musician
- Tyra Banks (born 1973) – model, television personality, producer and actress
- Ronald Barak (born 1943) – Olympic gymnast
- Andrea Barber (born 1976) – actress
- Lance Barber (born 1973) – actor (originally from Battle Creek, Michigan)
- Joseph Barbera (1911–2006) – animator, producer, director
- Louis L. Bard – motion picture theater proprietor
- Eric Barone (born 1987) – video game designer known professionally as ConcernedApe
- Nanette Barragán (born 1976) – U.S. congresswoman, former Hermosa Beach city councillor
- Eddie Barth (1931–2010) – actor and voiceover artist
- Ella Jay Basco (born 2006) – actress
- Paul L. Bates (1908–1995) – commander of the first Black tank battalion to fight in World War II
- Earl Battey (1935–2003) – major league baseball player
- Michael Bay (born 1965) – film director
- L.A. Beast (born 1984) – competitive eater (born in New Jersey)
- Warren Beatty (born 1937) – actor, director (born in Virginia)
- Beck (born 1970) – singer
- Ed Begley Jr. (born 1949) – actor
- Troian Bellisario (born 1985) – actress
- Jim Bellows (1922–2009) – editor (born in Michigan)
- Julie Bennett (1932–2020) – actress, voiceover artist (originally from Manhattan, New York)
- Ami Bera (born 1965) – U.S. representative
- John Beradino (1917–1996) – major league baseball player and actor
- Ryan Bergara (born 1990) – co-founder of Watcher Entertainment
- Candice Bergen (born 1946) – actress
- Nicolas Berggruen (born 1961) – philanthropist, founder of the Berggruen Institute
- Busby Berkeley (1895–1976) – choreographer, film director
- Corbin Bernsen (born 1954) – actor
- Molly Beucher – actress and film producer
- Steve Beuerlein (born 1965) – professional football player
- Beyoncé (born 1981) – singer, songwriter, actress, model, record producer, businesswoman (originally from Houston, Texas)
- Barbara Billingsley (1915–2010) – actress
- Camille Billops (1933–2019) – artist, film director
- Rachel Bilson (born 1981) – actress
- Thora Birch (born 1982) – actress
- Luna Blaise (born 2001) – actress
- Whitney Blake (1926–2002) – actress
- Rowan Blanchard (born 2001) – actress
- Mel Bleeker (1920–1996) – National Football League player
- Francesca Lia Block (born 1962) – author
- David Blu (born David Bluthenthal; 1980) – professional basketball player
- Jason Blum (born 1969) – film producer
- Betty Blythe (1893–1972) – actress
- Kwesi Boakye (born 1999) – voice actor
- Edwin Bodney – poet
- Faiq Bolkiah (born 1998) – soccer player and member of the House of Bolkiah
- Kyle Boller (born 1981) – football player
- Ashlee Bond (born 1985) – American-Israeli Olympic show jumping rider who competes for Israel
- William "Big Bill" Bonelli (1895–1970) – Los Angeles City Councilman (1927–1929), notably corrupt member of State Board of Equalization, fugitive
- Chaz Bono (born 1969) – gay rights activist
- Richard Boone (1917–1981) – actor
- Kate Bosworth (born 1983) – actress
- Shmuley Boteach (born 1966) – Orthodox rabbi, radio and television host, and author
- Jose Botello (born 1976) – soccer player and coach
- Travis Bowen (born 1989) – soccer player
- Tristan Bowen (born 1991) – soccer player
- Cameron Boyce (1999–2019) – actor and dancer
- Jason Boyce (born 1975) – soccer player
- Leigh Brackett (1915–1978) – writer
- Ray Bradbury (1920–2012) – writer
- Milton Bradley (born 1978) – professional baseball player
- Taj Bradley (born 2001) – professional baseball player
- Tom Bradley (1917–1998) – 38th mayor of Los Angeles (1973–1993) (originally from Calvert, Texas)
- Eddie Brandstatter (1886 – 1940) – restauranteur who was known as the "Host of Hollywood" (born in France)
- Creed Bratton – actor
- Ryan Braun (born 1983) – professional baseball player
- Nick Bravin (born 1971) – Olympic fencer
- Leo Breithaupt (1914–1984) – auto racer
- Donald Bren (born 1932) – businessman, owner of Irvine Company
- Milton H. Bren (1904–1979) – film producer, real estate developer, father of Donald Bren
- Eileen Brennan (1932–2013) – actress
- Patrick Brennan (born 1972) – actor
- Beau Bridges (born 1941) – actor
- Jeff Bridges (born 1949) – actor
- Alison Brie (born 1982) – actress
- Anna Beecroft Briggs (1860s–1949) – playwright (born in Ontario, Canada)
- Lance Briggs (born 1980) – professional football player
- Earl Alonzo Brininstool (1870–1957) – cowboy poet (born in New York)
- Eli Broad (1933–2021) – businessman
- James Brolin (born 1940) – actor
- Josh Brolin (born 1968) – actor
- Albert Brooks (born 1947) – actor, screenwriter, director
- Alton Brown (born 1962) – chef, Food Network personality
- Helen Gurley Brown (1922–2012) – magazine publisher and author (originally from Green Forest, Arkansas)
- Jason Derek Brown (born 1969) – fugitive currently on the FBI Ten Most Wanted Fugitives List
- Julie Brown (born 1958) – actress
- Marc Brown (born 1961) – television newscaster
- Jackson Browne (born 1948) – musician
- Kobe Bryant (1978–2020) – Lakers basketball player (born in Pennsylvania)
- Marilyn Buferd (1925–1990) – actress, Miss America 1946 (originally from Detroit, Michigan)
- Charles Bukowski (1920–1994) – author
- Candace Cameron Bure (born 1976) – actress (Full House)
- Scott Burnett (born 1974) – darts player (born in Sacramento)
- George H. Burton (1843–1917), Inspector General of the United States Army
- Hana Burton (born 1997) – racing driver
- Tim Burton (born 1958) – film director (born in Burbank)
- Jake Busey (born 1971) – actor
- Jeanie Buss (born 1961) – Lakers executive (born in Santa Monica)
- Jerry Buss (1933–2013) – owned Lakers, Kings and Sparks teams, Forum Arena (born in Utah)
- Jim Buss (born 1959) – Lakers executive
- Paul Butcher (born 1994) – actor

== C ==
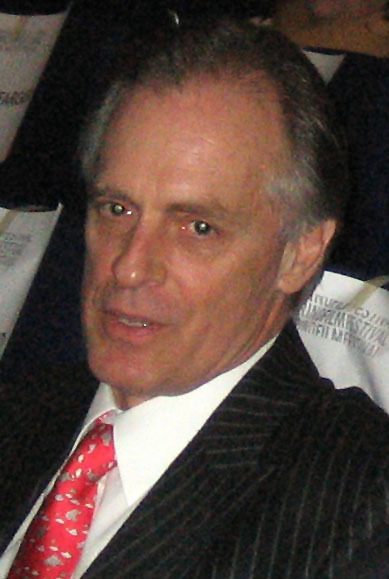
Keith Carradine

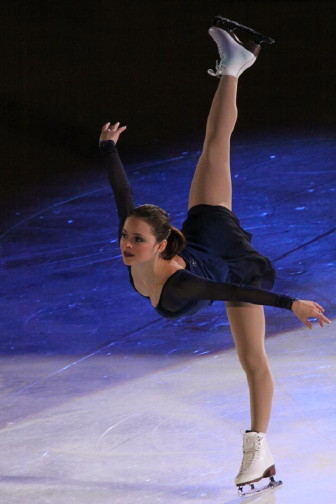
Sasha Cohen

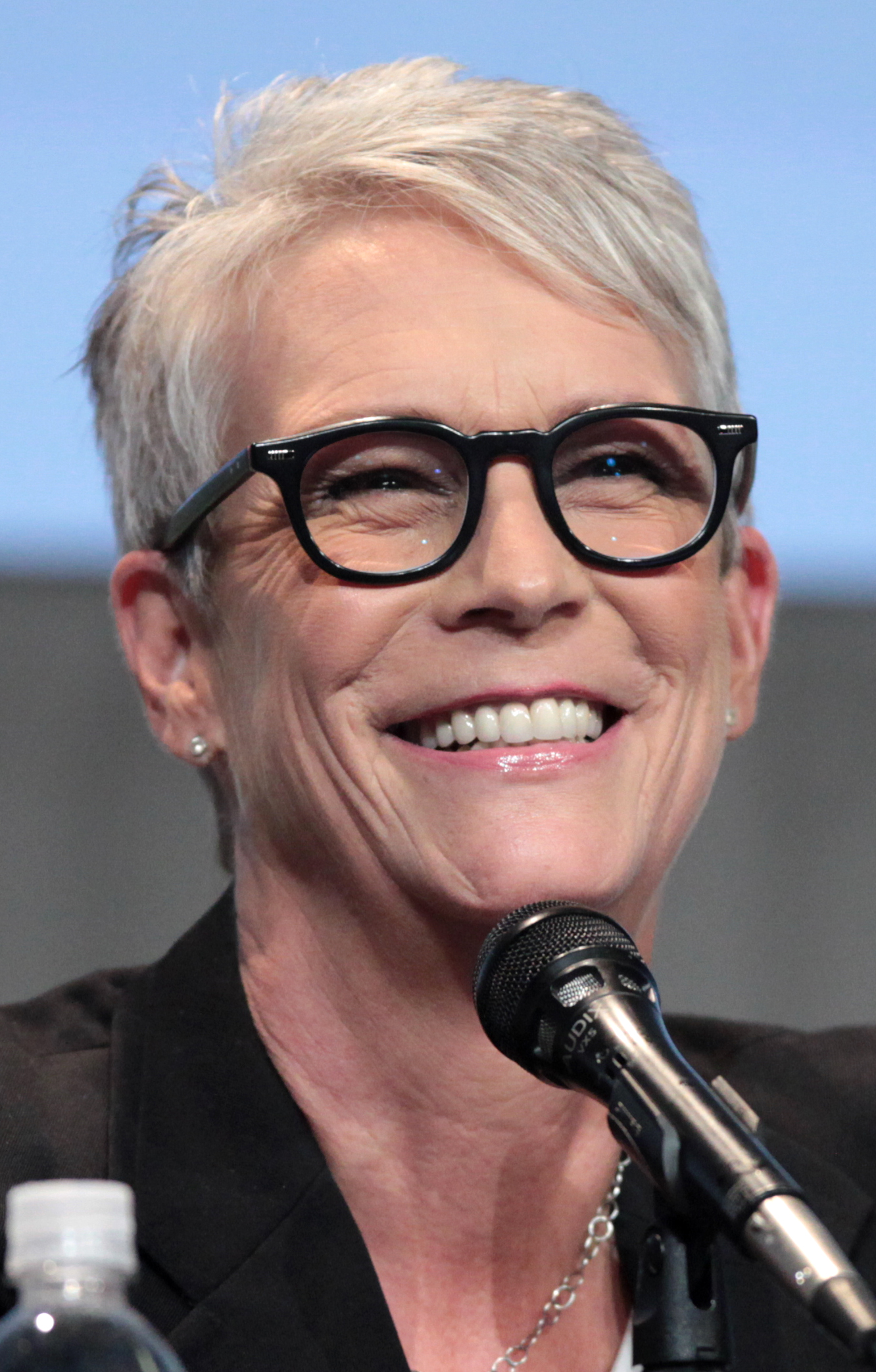
Jamie Lee Curtis

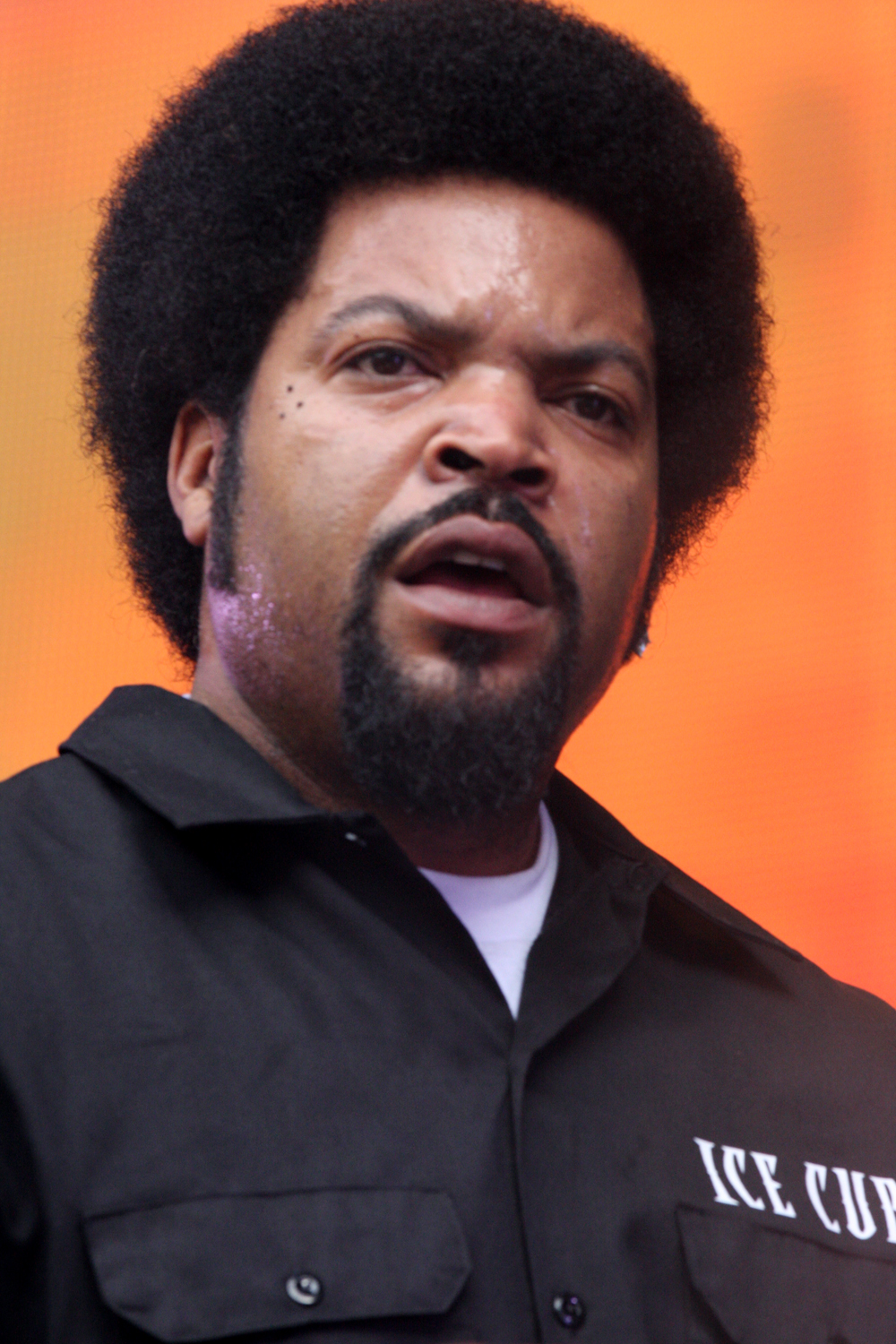
Ice Cube

- Scott Caan (born 1976) – actor
- Camila Cabello (born 1997) – singer
- Charlotte Caffey (born 1953) – guitarist, The Go-Go's
- John Cage (1912–1992) – composer
- Rory Calhoun (1922–1999) – actor
- Calmatic (born 1987) – filmmaker
- Kareem Campbell (born 1973) – professional skateboarder (born in Harlem, New York, moved to Los Angeles in his early youth)
- Kirk Cameron (born 1970) – actor
- Jordin Canada (born 1995) – WNBA player
- Stephen J. Cannell (1941–2010) – television director, writer, producer
- Marine Cano (born 1954) – soccer player and coach
- Kylie Cantrall (born 2005) – actress, singer, YouTube personality (born in Tarzana)
- Lizzy Caplan (born 1982) – actress
- Steve Cardenas (born 1974) – martial artist and retired actor (born in Virginia Beach, Virginia)
- Tony Cárdenas (born 1963) – former U.S. congressman, Los Angeles city councilor and California State Assemblyman
- Belinda Carlisle (born 1958) – singer
- Kim Carnes (born 1945) – singer
- Adam Carolla (born 1964) – comedian, actor, entertainer
- Chad Carothers – freehand painter whose career was based in Los Angeles
- David Carradine (1936–2009) – actor
- Robert Carradine (born 1954) – actor
- Mercedes Carrera – pornographic actress
- Jim Carrey (born 1962) – movie actor, comedian (born in Newmarket)
- Leo Carrillo (1880–1961) – actor
- Johnny Carson (1925–2005) – television personality (born in Iowa)
- Josue Cartagena (born 1998) – soccer player
- Mike Carter (born 1955) – American-Israeli basketball player
- Matt Cassel (born 1982) – professional football player
- Katie Cassidy (born 1986) – actress
- Patrick Cassidy (born 1962) – actor
- Shaun Cassidy (born 1958) – singer, actor, television producer
- David Castañeda (born 1989) – actor
- Agustin Cazarez (born 1989) – soccer player
- Richard Chamberlain (1934–2025) – actor
- Wilt Chamberlain (1936–1999) – basketball player, member of the Naismith Memorial Basketball Hall of Fame (born in Pennsylvania)
- Stan Chambers (1923–2015) – television news reporter
- Marge Champion (1919–2020) – actress, dancer
- Dorothy Buffum Chandler (1901–1997) – cultural leader (born in Illinois)
- Harry Chandler (1864–1944) – chief executive of Los Angeles Times (born in New Hampshire)
- Norman Chandler (1899–1973) – publisher and chairman of the board of the Los Angeles Times
- Otis Chandler (1927–2006) – transformative publisher of Los Angeles Times
- Raymond Chandler (1888–1959) – author (born in Chicago)
- Rosalind Chao (born 1957) – actress
- Charles Chaplin Jr. (1925–1968) – actor
- Charlie Chaplin (1889–1977) – iconic actor and director, Los Angeles film industry pioneer (born in England)
- Sydney Chaplin (1885–1965) – actor (born in England)
- Max Charles (born 2003) – actor (born in Ohio)
- Antonio Chatman (born 1979) – NFL wide receiver
- Eric Chavez (born 1977) – baseball player
- Ian Chen (born 2006) – actor
- Dorothy Cheney (1916–2014) – tennis player
- Don Cherry (born 1934) – jazz musician, trumpet (born in Oklahoma)
- Jack Chick (1924–2016) – evangelist and cartoonist
- Hagop Chirishian (born 1989) – soccer player
- Roy Choi (born 1970) – Korean American chef and TV host (originally from Seoul, South Korea)
- Warren Christopher (1925–2011) – diplomat, Christopher Commission (born in North Dakota)
- Judy Chu (born 1953) – U.S. representative for California
- Liz Claman (born 1963) – CNBC anchor
- Greg Clark (born 1965) – NFL player
- R. Gilbert Clayton (1922–2013) – film set designer
- Mark Clear (born 1956) – major league baseball two-time All Star relief pitcher
- Eldridge Cleaver (1935–1998) – writer, activist (born in Arkansas)
- Frances Bean Cobain (born 1992) – visual artist and model
- Johnnie Cochran (1937–2005) – attorney
- Mickey Cohen (1913–1976) – mobster (born in Brooklyn)
- Sasha Cohen (born 1984) – figure skater
- Tiffany Cohen (born 1966) – Olympic swimmer (born in Culver City)
- Mindy Cohn (born 1966) – actress
- Natalie Cole (1950–2015) – singer
- Fritz Coleman (born 1948) – television meteorologist (born in Philadelphia)
- Keo Coleman (born 1970) – NFL player
- Monique Coleman (born 1980) – actress, dancer, singer, entrepreneur, and philanthropist (originally from Orangeburg, South Carolina)
- Wanda Coleman (1946–2013) – poet and writer
- Lily Collins (born 1989) – British-American actress and model (originally from Guildford, Surrey, England)
- Dorothy Comingore (1913–1971) – actress
- Christian Convery (born 2009) – actor
- Curtis Conway (born 1971) – professional football player
- Ry Cooder (born 1947) – musician, composer
- Jackie Coogan (1914–1984) – actor
- Sofia Cook (born 2004) – soccer player
- Coolio (1963–2022) – rap artist
- Calico Cooper (born 1981) – actor, singer, and dancer
- Dewey Cooper (born 1974) – kickboxer
- Jackie Cooper (1922–2011) – actor, director
- Lillian Copeland (1904–1964) – Olympic discus champion; set world records in discus, javelin, and shot put
- Pat Corrales (1941–2023) – baseball player
- Miranda Cosgrove (born 1993) – actress, singer
- John Cossette (1957–2011) – theater and television producer
- Michael Costello (born 1983) – fashion designer
- Kevin Costner (born 1955) – actor
- Al Cowens (1951–2002) – baseball player
- Ione Virginia Hill Cowles (1858–1940) – clubwoman, social leader
- Aaron Cox (born 1965) – football wide receiver
- Louis Craine (1957–1989) – serial killer who was one of several serial killers nicknamed the Southside Slayer
- Robert Crais (born 1953) – novelist (born in Louisiana)
- Bryan Cranston (born 1956) – actor
- Christina Crawford (born 1939) – actress
- Joan Crawford (1906–1977) – actress (originally from San Antonio, Texas)
- Johnny Crawford (1946–2021) – actor
- Willie Crawford (1946–2004) – baseball player
- Richard Crenna (1926–2003) – actor, film director
- Coco Crisp (born 1979) – baseball player
- James Cromwell (born 1940) – actor
- David Crosby (1941–2023) – musician
- Denise Crosby (born 1957) – actress
- Gary Crosby (1933–1995) – actor
- Mary Crosby (born 1959) – actress
- Andraé Crouch (1942–2015) – musician
- Tom Cruise (born 1962) – actor
- Elisha Cuthbert (born 1982) – actress (originally from Calgary, Canada)
- Jamie Lee Curtis (born 1958) – actress
- Shannon Curtis – musician, singer-songwriter
- Alfredo Czerner (1934–2025) – rower

== D ==
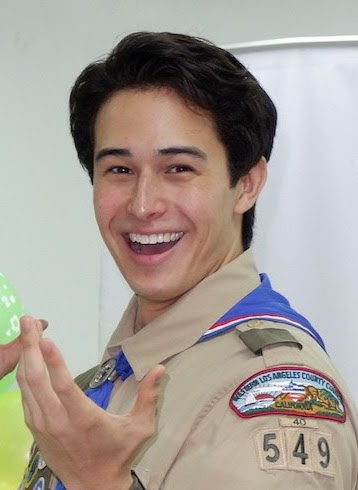
Ivan Dorschner

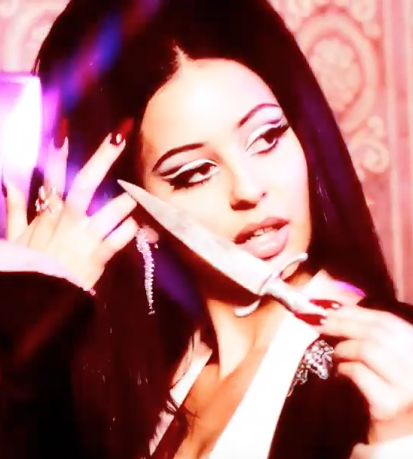
Alexa Demie

- Elizabeth Daily (born 1961) – actress
- Steve Daines (born 1962) – U.S. senator for Montana
- Britain Dalton (born 2001) – actor
- Carson Daly (born 1973) – television personality; host of The Voice and Last Call with Carson Daly (born in Santa Monica)
- Harry Danning (1911–2004) – major league baseball player
- Iva Toguri D'Aquino (1916–2006) – disc jockey and radio personality who was accused of treason before being pardoned
- Frank Darabont (born 1959) – director (born in France)
- Kim Darby (born 1947) – actress
- Ben Davidson (1940–2012) – football player
- Baron Davis (born 1979) – basketball player
- Dix Davis (1926–2024) – child actor in film and radio
- Eric Davis (born 1962) – professional baseball player
- Jeff Davis (born 1973) – actor, comedian, singer
- Julienne Davis (born 1973) – actress, singer, model
- Mike Davis (1946–2022) – urban theorist and author of City of Quartz and Ecology of Fear
- Patti Davis (born 1952) – actress, daughter of Nancy and Ronald Reagan
- Tim Davis (1924–1982) – child actor in film
- Roxann Dawson (born 1958) – actress
- Shane Dawson (born 1988) – YouTube personality
- Sylvia Day (born 1973) – author
- David-Simon Dayan (born 1995) – artist
- Mandana Dayani (born 1982) – Iranian-American businesswoman and media executive
- Taylor Dearden (born 1993) – actress
- Oscar De La Hoya (born 1973) – boxer
- Rebecca De Mornay (born 1959) – film and television actress
- Brian de la Puente (born 1985) – NFL football player
- Giada De Laurentiis (born 1970) – Italian-American chef, writer, and television personality (originally from Rome, Italy)
- Frances Dee (1909–2004) – actress
- Rick Dees (born 1950) – radio personality (born in Florida)
- Gloria DeHaven (1925–2016) – actress
- Milton DeLugg (1918–2015) – composer, bandleader
- Alexa Demie (born 1990) – actress
- John Densmore (born 1944) – musician
- Johnny Depp (born 1963) – actor
- John Derek (1926–1998) – actor, director
- Laura Dern (born 1967) – actress
- DeMar DeRozan (born 1989) – basketball player (born in Compton)
- Emily Deschanel (born 1976) – actress
- Zooey Deschanel (born 1980) – actress, singer
- Deuce (born 1983) – singer, rapper
- Leonardo DiCaprio (born 1974) – actor, environmental activist
- Larry Dierker (born 1946) – baseball player and manager
- Roy Edward Disney (1893–1971) – television producer
- Walt Disney (1901–1966) – animator, film studio, theme park founder (born in Illinois)
- Nina Dobrev (born 1989) – actress (born in Bulgaria)
- David Dobrik (born 1996) – YouTube personality (born in Slovakia)
- Bobby Doerr (1918–2017) – baseball player
- Doja Cat (born 1995) – singer
- Micky Dolenz (born 1945) – actor, musician
- Eric Dolphy (1928–1964) – musician
- Terry Donahue (1944–2021) – football coach
- Ed Donovan (1928–1989) – drag racer, engine builder
- Ivan Dorschner (born 1990) – actor, television host, model, Pinoy Big Brother: Teen Clash 2010 5th Big Placer
- Susan Miller Dorsey (1857–1946) – educator
- Kirk Douglas (1916–2020) – actor, philanthropist (born in New York)
- Tony Dow (1945–2022) – actor
- Morton Downey Jr. (1932–2001) – talk show host
- Robert Downey Jr. (born 1965) – actor (born in New York)
- Brian Downing (born 1950) – major league baseball player
- Jack Dragna (1891–1956) – Mafia boss (born in Sicily)
- Daryl Dragon (1942–2019) – musician
- Eric Draper – photographer who served as the Chief Official White House Photographer
- Dr. Dre (born 1965) – musician, composer
- Don Drysdale (1936–1993) – Hall of Fame baseball player (born in Van Nuys)
- Erik Dueñas (born 2004) – soccer player
- Dumbfoundead (born 1986) – rapper
- Jon Dunkle (born 1960) – serial killer
- Jerry Dunphy (1921–2002) – television news reporter (born in Wisconsin)
- Tony Duquette (1914–1999) – designer
- Denis Dutton (1944–2010) – philosopher
- Clea DuVall (born 1977) – actress
- Jakob Dylan (born 1969) – musician

== E ==
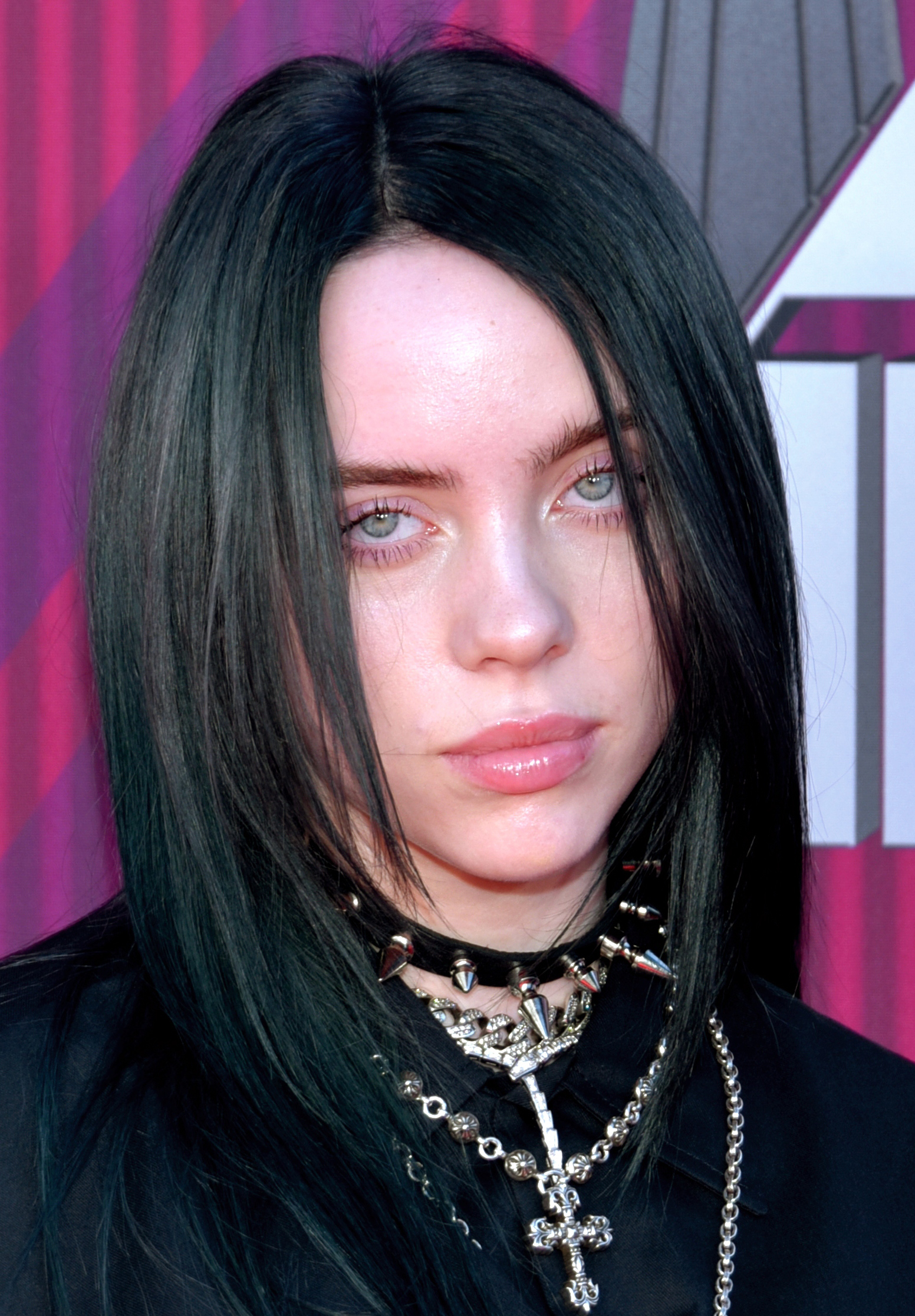
Billie Eilish

- Carl Earn (1921–2007) – tennis player
- Kyle Eastwood (born 1968) – musician
- Eazy-E (1964–1995) – rapper
- Alex Ebert (born 1978) – singer-songwriter, composer
- J. W. Eddy (1832–1916) – railway engineer, builder of Angels Flight (born in New York)
- Mark Edward (1951–2024) – mentalist and psychic entertainer
- Billie Eilish (born 2001) – singer-songwriter
- Hannah Einbinder (born 1995) – comedian and actress
- Thelma "Tiby" Eisen (1922–2014) – baseball player
- Isaiah Eisendorf (born 1996) – American-Israeli basketball player in the Israeli Basketball Premier League
- Larry Elder (born 1952) – radio personality
- Danny Elfman (born 1953) – composer, musician
- Jenna Elfman (born 1971) – actress
- John C. Elliott (1919–2001) – 39th governor of American Samoa
- Bret Easton Ellis (born 1964) – novelist
- Dock Ellis (1945–2008) – major league baseball player
- Harlan Ellison (1934–2018) – science fiction author, born in Cleveland
- James Ellroy (born 1948) – author
- John Elway (born 1960) – Hall of Fame football player (born in Washington)
- Mike "SuperJew" Epstein (born 1943, The Bronx, New York) – Major League Baseball first baseman
- Eric Erlandson (born 1963) – musician (Hole)
- Larisa Eryomina (born 1950) – stage and screen actress (originally from Tiraspol)
- Jaime Escalante (1930–2010) – educator (born in Bolivia)
- Chris Evans (born 1981) – actor (originally from Boston, Massachusetts)
- Briana Evigan (born 1986) – actress
- Roger Ewing (1942–2025) – actor on Gunsmoke

== F ==
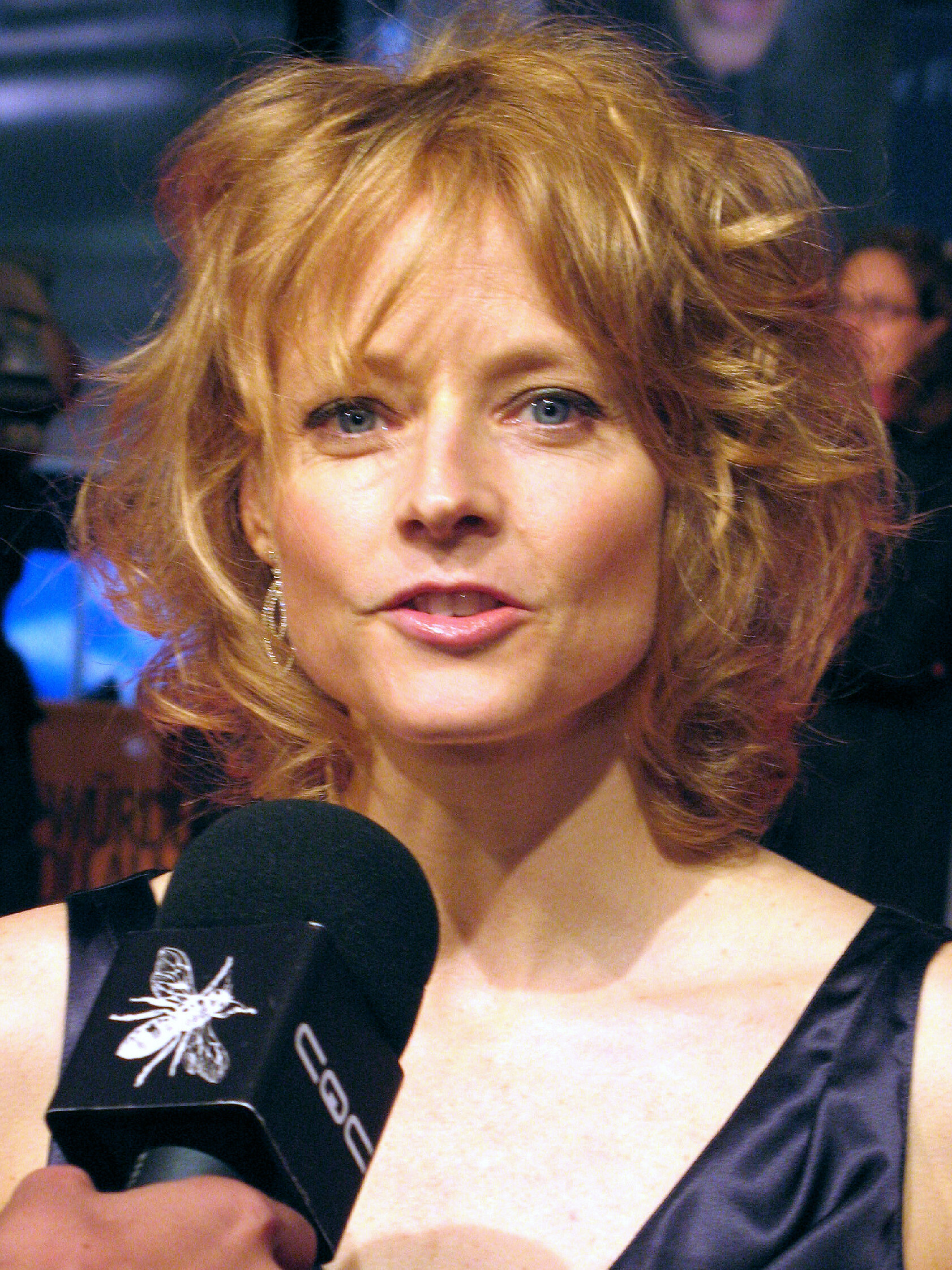
Jodie Foster

- Shelley Fabares (born 1944) – actress (born in Santa Monica)
- John Fante (1909–1983) – author (born in Denver)
- Roozbeh Farahanipour (born 1971, Tehran, Iran) – activist, West Los Angeles Chamber of Commerce CEO
- Jordan Farmar (born 1986) – basketball player for Maccabi Tel Aviv
- Richard Farnsworth (1920–2000) – actor
- Mia Farrow (born 1945) – actress and activist
- David Faustino (born 1974) – actor
- Roshon Fegan (born 1991) – actor
- Raymond E. Feist (born 1945) – author
- Beanie Feldstein (born 1993) – actress
- Allyson Felix (born 1985) – athlete, Olympic gold medalist
- Robert Fellows (1903–1969) – film producer
- Fergie (born 1975) – singer
- Miguel Ferrer (1955–2017) – actor (born in Santa Monica)
- America Ferrera (born 1984) – actress
- Sally Field (born 1946) – actress (born in Pasadena)
- Cecil Fielder (born 1963) – baseball player
- Danielle Fishel (born 1981) – actress (originally from Mesa, Arizona)
- Carrie Fisher (1956–2016) – actress, writer, producer (born in Beverly Hills)
- Jeff Fisher (born 1958) – NFL coach (born in Culver City)
- Five for Fighting (born 1965) – singer-songwriter
- Rhonda Fleming (1923–2020) – actress
- Sean Flynn (1941–1971) – journalist
- Nick Folk (born 1984) – NFL kicker (born in Hollywood)
- Bridget Fonda (born 1964) – actress
- Kai Forbath (born 1987) – NFL kicker (born in Santa Monica)
- Harrison Ford (born 1942) – actor (born in Illinois)
- Mary Alice Ford (1935–2008) – politician
- Marlon Fossey (born 1998) – soccer player
- David Foster (born 1949) – record producer (born in Victoria, British Columbia, Canada)
- Jodie Foster (born 1962) – actress, director, producer
- Sara Foster (born 1981) – actress
- Allen Fox (born 1939) – tennis player and coach
- Mackenzie Foy (born 2000) – actress and model
- Dillon Francis (born 1987) – DJ
- Bonnie Franklin (1944–2013) – actress (born in Santa Monica)
- Lonnie David Franklin (1952–2020) – serial killer and rapist
- Mike Franks (born 1936) – tennis player
- Linda Fratianne (born 1960) – figure skater
- Stan Freberg (1926–2015) – voice actor, comedian
- Jennifer Freeman (born 1985) – actress
- Sherwood Fries (1920–1986) – football player for Green Bay Packers
- Frost (born 1964, Windsor California) – Chicano rapper
- Karen Fukuhara (born 1992) – actress

== G ==
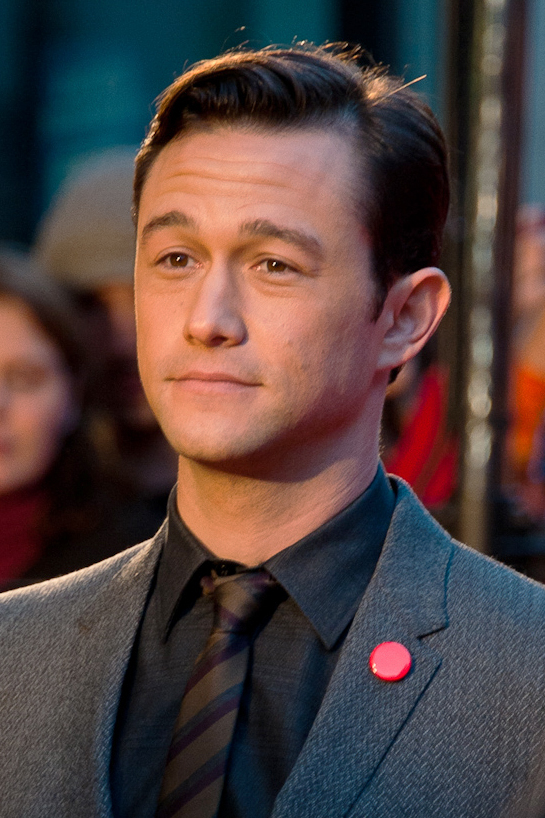
Joseph Gordon-Levitt

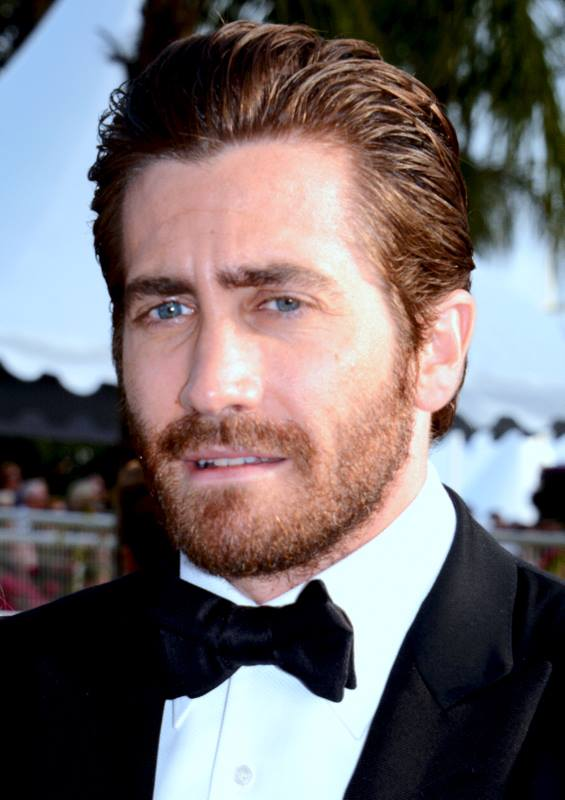
Jake Gyllenhaal

- Lady Gaga (born 1986) – singer (originally from New York City)
- Corey Gaines (born 1965) – basketball player and coach
- Louis Galen (1925–2007) – philanthropist (born in Ohio)
- Donte Gamble (born 1978) – football player
- Harry Gamboa Jr. – artist
- Tom Gamboa (born 1948) – baseball coach and manager
- The Game (born 1979) – rapper and actor
- Eric Garcetti (born 1971) – former mayor of Los Angeles
- Gil Garcetti (born 1941) – district attorney
- Aimee Garcia (born 1978) – actress (originally from Chicago, Illinois)
- Anthony Garcia (serial killer) (born 1973), former doctor and serial killer on death row in Nebraska
- Mike Garcia (born 1976), U.S. representative for California
- Andrew Garfield (born 1983) – actor
- Fernando Garibay (born 1982) – record producer
- Troy Garity (born 1973) – actor
- Judy Garland (1922–1969) – singer, actress (Born in Grand Rapids, Minnesota)
- Marlon Garnett (born 1975) – former NBA player and currently an assistant coach for the Charlotte Hornets
- Tay Garnett (1894–1977) – film director
- Leif Garrett (born 1961) – singer, actor
- Mike Garrett (born 1944) – football player, athletic director
- Spencer Garrett (born 1963) – actor
- Joseph Gatt (born 1971, London) – English actor, model, voice actor
- John Gavin (1931–2018) – actor, ambassador
- Catherine Gayer (born 1937) – coloratura soprano
- Frank Gehry (born 1929) – architect
- Genie (born 1957) – feral child
- Paul George (born 1990) – basketball player (born in Palmdale)
- James Georgopoulos – visual artist
- Mark Geragos (born 1957) – criminal defense attorney
- Gina Gershon (born 1962) – actress
- Balthazar Getty (born 1975) – actor
- Tyrese Gibson (born 1978) – singer-songwriter, actor
- Aletha Gilbert (1870–1931) – civic leader
- Melissa Gilbert (born 1964) – actress, film director, labor union president
- Gwynne Gilford (born 1946) – actress, mother of Chris Pine
- Glasses Malone (born 1978) – rapper
- Troy Glaus (born 1976) – baseball player (born in Tarzana)
- Sharon Gless (born 1943) – actress
- Billy Glide (1970–2014) – pornographic actor
- Joe Gold (1922–2004) – founder of Gold's Gym
- Jonathan Gold (1960–2018) – Pulitzer Prize-winning food critic for L.A. Weekly and the Los Angeles Times
- Tony Goldwyn (born 1960) – actor
- Jimmy Gomez (born 1979 in Orange County) – U.S. congressman, former California assemblyman
- Selena Gomez (born 1992) – actress, singer (originally from Grand Prairie, Texas)
- Xochitl Gomez (born 2006) – actress
- Pancho Gonzales (1928–1995) – tennis star
- Meagan Good (born 1981) – actress
- Cuba Gooding Jr. (born 1968 in New York City) – actor
- Omar Gooding (born 1976) – actor
- Dexter Gordon (1923–1990) – composer
- Joe Gordon (1915–1978) – baseball player and manager
- Kim Gordon (born 1953, Rochester, New York) – musician, member of Sonic Youth
- Robby Gordon (born 1969) – NASCAR and off-road driver
- Joseph Gordon–Levitt (born 1981) – actor
- Steve Gottlieb (born 1949) – amateur astronomer
- Billy Gould (born 1963) – bassist for Faith No More
- Kaysan Ghasseminejad (born 1994) - DJ, streamer and partial owner and manager for FaZe Esports
- Gloria Grahame (1923–1981) – actress
- Andy Grammer (born 1983) – singer
- Ariana Grande (born 1993, Boca Raton, Florida) – singer, songwriter, actress
- Katherine Grant (1904–1937) – actress
- Paul Gray (1972–2010) – bassist of Slipknot
- Brian Grazer (born 1951) – film and television producer
- Jack Dylan Grazer (born 2003) – actor
- Alex Greenwald (born 1979) – musician and actor
- David Gregory (born 1970) – television journalist
- Virginia Grey (1917–2004) – actress
- Alyssa Farah Griffin (born 1989) – 3rd White House Director of Strategic Communications and television commentator
- Blake Griffin (born 1989, Oklahoma) – basketball player
- Griffith J. Griffith (1850–1919) – philanthropist, donor of the land for Griffith Park
- Sandi Griffiths (born 1946) – singer
- Josh Groban (born 1981) – singer
- Kim Gruenenfelder – writer
- Demmette Guidry – music industry executive
- Alfred Guth (1908–1996) – Austrian-born American water polo player, swimmer, and Olympic modern pentathlete
- Chris Gwynn (born 1964) – baseball player
- Tony Gwynn (1960–2014) – Hall of Fame baseball player
- Jake Gyllenhaal (born 1980) – actor
- Maggie Gyllenhaal (born 1977, New York City) – actress

== H ==
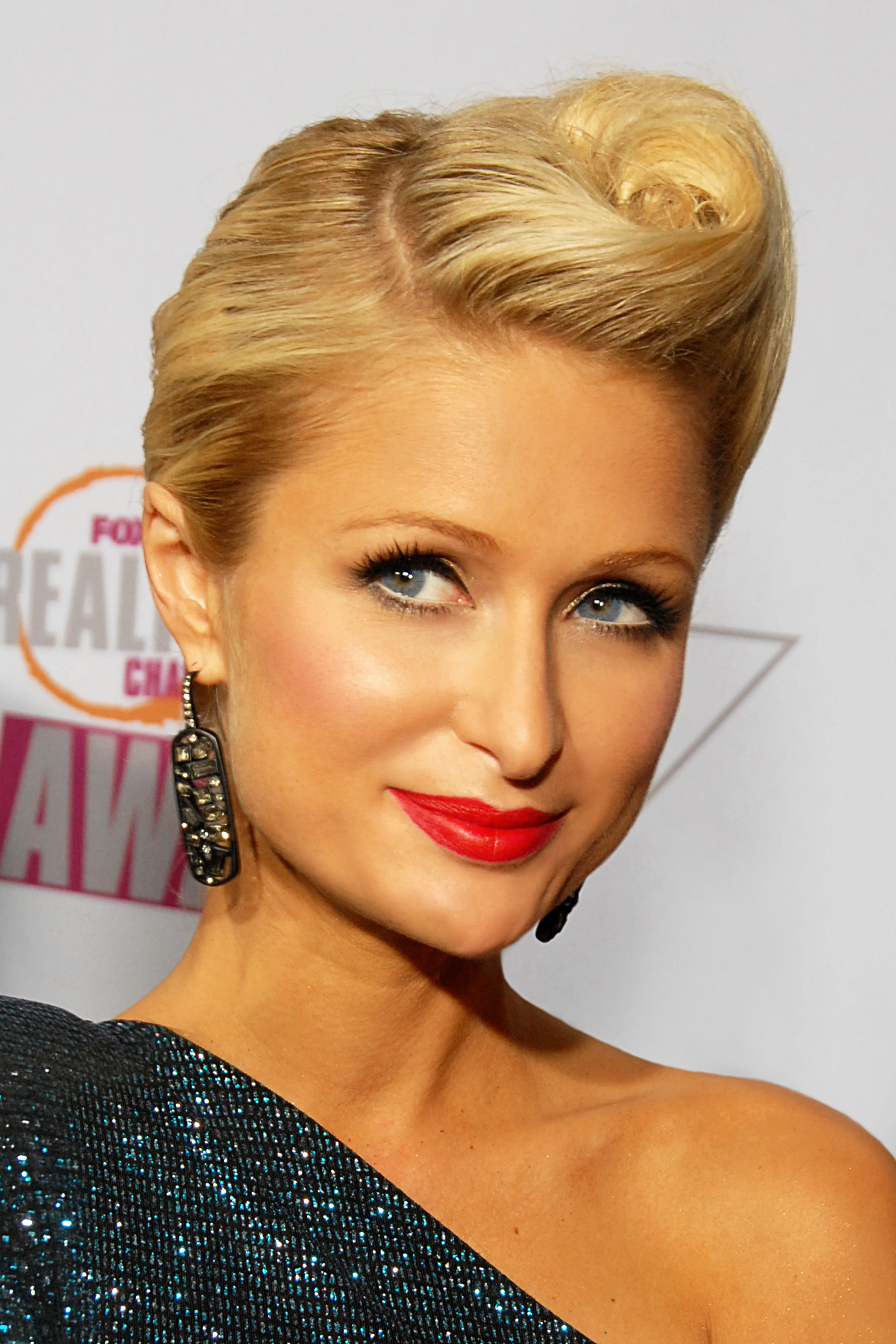
Paris Hilton

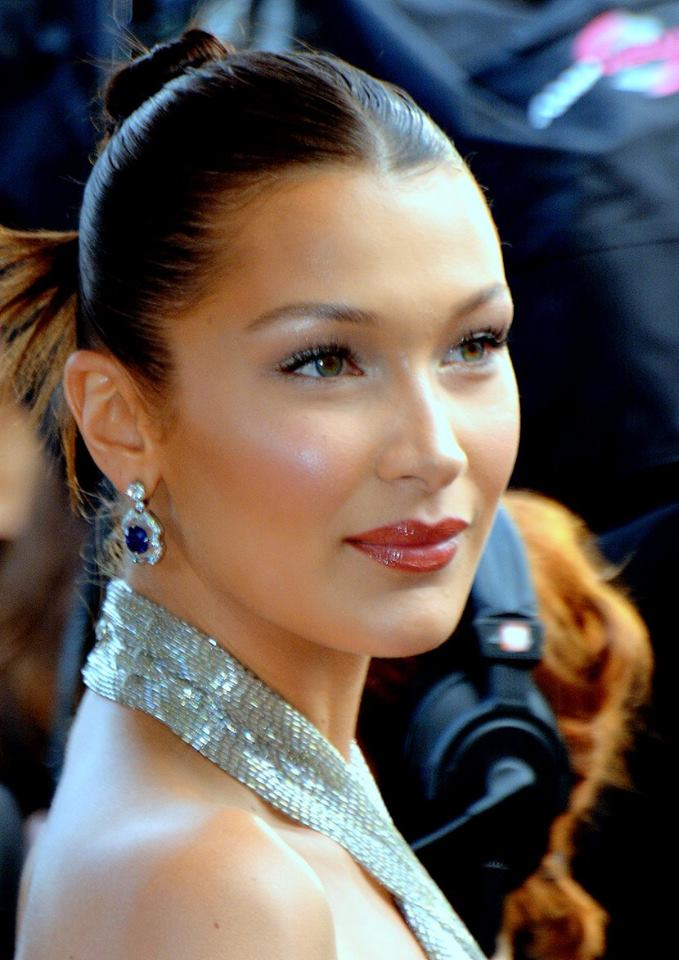
Bella Hadid

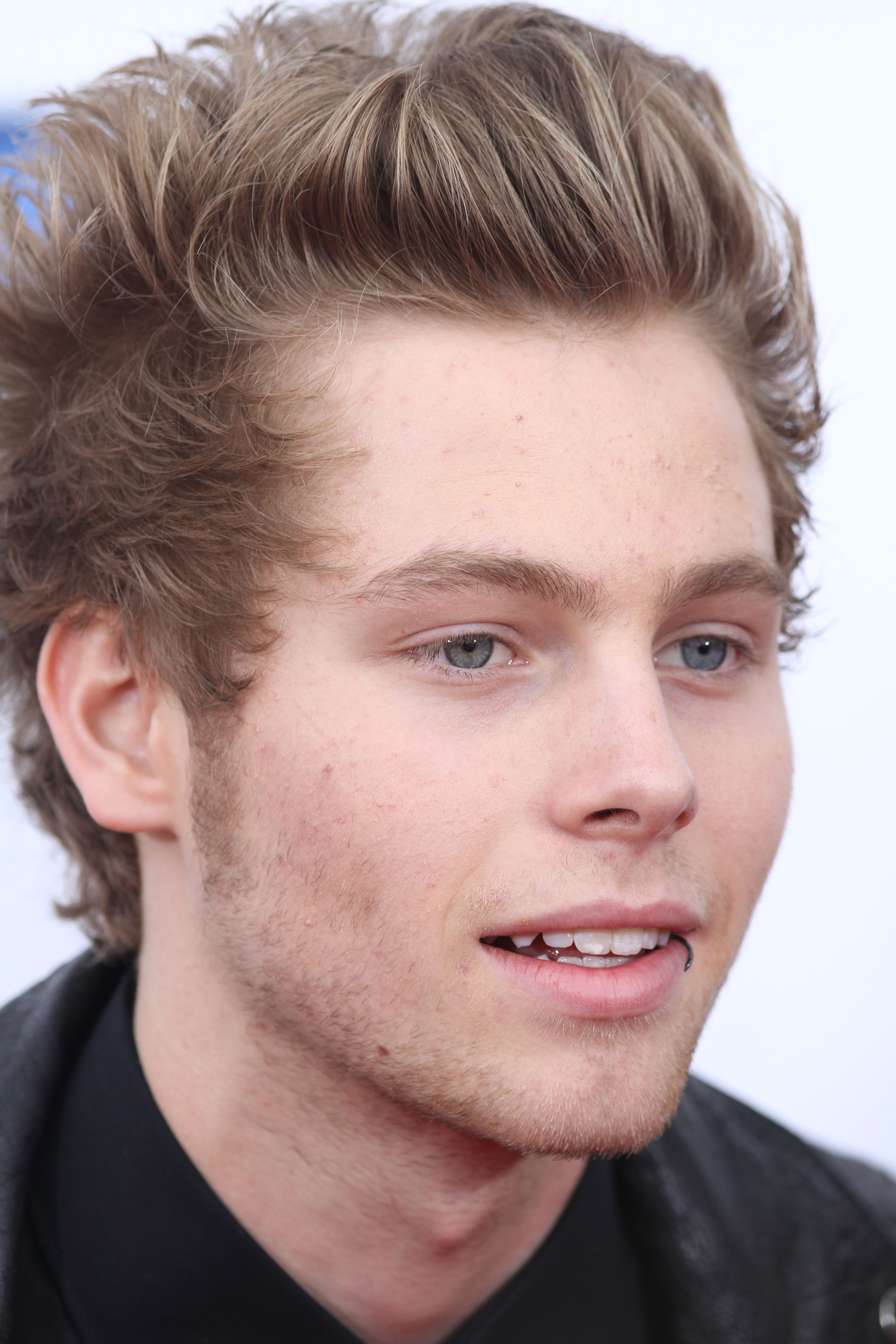
Luke Hemmings

- Bella Hadid (born 1996, Washington DC) – model
- Gigi Hadid (born 1995) – model
- Mohamed Hadid (born 1948, Nazareth, Israel) – Bel Air real estate developer
- James Hahn (born 1950) – mayor of Los Angeles (2001–05)
- Alana Haim (born 1991) – musician (member of the pop rock band Haim)
- Danielle Haim (born 1989) – musician (member of the pop rock band Haim)
- Este Haim (born 1986) – musician (member of the pop rock band Haim)
- Randa Haines (born 1945) – director, film producer
- H. R. Haldeman (1926–1993) – Watergate scandal figure, White House chief of staff
- Alan Hale Jr. (1921–1990) – actor
- Jaclyn Hales (born 1986) – actress (originally from Syracuse, New York)
- Jack Haley Jr. (1933–2001) – actor, film director, writer, producer
- Jackie Earle Haley (born 1961) – actor
- Derrick Hall (born 1969) – business executive; president and CEO of Arizona Diamondbacks
- Chico Hamilton (1921–2013) – jazz drummer
- Jordan Hamilton (born 1990) – basketball player in the Israel Basketball Premier League
- Amelia Gray Hamlin (born 2001) – model
- Armie Hammer (born 1986) – actor
- Albert Hammond Jr (born 1980) – rhythm guitarist of rock band The Strokes, musician
- HANA (born 1989) – musician, singer-songwriter and record producer (originally from Atlanta, Georgia)
- George Allan Hancock (1875–1965) – oilman, real estate developer, donated the La Brea Tarpits to the county of Los Angeles
- Tom Hanks (born 1956) – actor, film director
- Alex Hannum (1923–2002) – NBA player and coach
- Harold Harby (1894–1978) – Los Angeles City Council member
- Darlene Hard (1936–2021) – tennis player
- Lula Mae Hardaway (1930–2006) – mother and collaborator of Stevie Wonder
- James Harden (born 1989) – professional basketball player for the Brooklyn Nets and 2018 NBA MVP
- Mariska Hargitay (born 1964) – actress (born in Santa Monica)
- Mark Harmon (born 1951) – actor (born in Burbank)
- Erik Harris (born 1990) – free safety for the Atlanta Falcons
- Milton Harris (1906–1991) – chemist
- Shawn Harrison (born 1973) – actor
- Ray Harryhausen (1920–2013) – special effects director
- Dominique Hatfield (born 1994) – football player
- Noah Hathaway (born 1971) – actor
- Harry Hay (1912–2002) – founder of the Mattachine Society
- Jack W. Hayford (1934–2023) – televangelist
- Julia Sampson Hayward (1934–2011) – tennis player
- Chick Hearn (1916–2002) – Lakers basketball broadcaster (born in Illinois)
- Hugh Hefner (1926–2017) – magazine publisher (born in Illinois)
- Max Heidegger (born 1997) – American-Israeli basketball player in the Israeli Basketball Premier League
- John Helwig (1927–1994) – football player
- Luke Hemmings (born 1996) – singer-songwriter, musician, member of 5 Seconds of Summer (born in Australia)
- George Hendrick (born 1949) – baseball player
- Chuck Henry (born 1946) – television newscaster
- Sek Henry (born 1987) – professional basketball player, 2018 Israeli Basketball Premier League MVP
- Kobe Hernandez-Foster (born 2002) – soccer player
- John S. Herrington (born 1939) – cabinet member in Reagan administration
- Barbara Hershey (born 1948) – actress
- Darryl Hickman (1931–2024) – actor, studio executive
- Dwayne Hickman (1934–2022) – actor
- Robert Hilburn (born 1939) – pop music critic for Los Angeles Times 1970 –2005
- Andy Hill (born c. 1950) – 3x college national champion basketball player, president of CBS Productions and Channel One News, author, and motivational speaker
- E.V. Hill (1933–2003) – pastor (Mount Zion Missionary Baptist Church) (born in Texas)
- Jonah Hill (born 1983) – actor, filmmaker, comedian
- Roy W. Hill (1899–1986) – auto mogul, philanthropist
- Carla Anderson Hills (born 1934) – cabinet member in Reagan administration
- Paris Hilton (born 1981) – celebrity, model, actress, DJ (originally from New York City)
- Jerome Hines (1921–2003) – actor
- Emile Hirsch (born 1985) – actor
- David Hoberman (born 1952) – film producer, founder of Mandeville Films
- George Hodel (1907–1999) – doctor, suspected Black Dahlia killer
- Gaynel Hodge (1937–2020) – songwriter
- Dustin Hoffman (born 1937) – actor
- Jrue Holiday (born 1990) – NBA player
- Willa Holland (born 1991) – actress and model
- Jennifer Holt (1920–1997) – actress
- Olivia Hastings Holt (born 1997) – actress, singer (originally from Germantown, Tennessee)
- Tim Holt (1919–1973) – actor
- Calum Hood (born 1996) – singer-songwriter, musician, member of 5 Seconds of Summer (born in Australia)
- Bob Hope (1903–2003) – comedian, actor, Toluca Lake resident (born in England)
- Marcus Jamal Hopson (born 1985) – rapper (born in Panorama City)
- Monica Horan (born 1963) – actress (originally from Darby, Pennsylvania)
- Cody Horn (born 1988) – actress (Magic Mike)
- James Horner (1953–2015) – composer
- Richard Steven Horvitz (born 1966) – voice actor
- Marques Houston (born 1981) – singer
- Bryce Dallas Howard (born 1981) – actress
- Clint Howard (born 1959) – actor (born in Burbank)
- Ron Howard (born 1954) – director, actor (born in Oklahoma)
- C. Thomas Howell (born 1966) – actor
- Kelly Hu (born 1968) – actress, former fashion model and beauty queen (originally from Honolulu, Hawaii)
- Vanessa Hudgens (born 1988) – actress
- Kate Hudson (born 1979) – actress, singer
- Howard Hughes (1905–1976) – aviation pioneer, film producer (born in Iowa)
- D. L. Hughley (born 1963) – actor, comedian
- Bob Humphreys (born 1940) – football player
- William Hung (born 1983) – American Idol contestant
- Helen Hunt (born 1963) – actress (born in Culver City)
- Hugo Huntzinger (c. 1934–1993) – park ranger
- Nipsey Hussle (1985–2019) – rapper, entrepreneur
- Anjelica Huston (born 1951) – actress (born in Santa Monica)
- Josh Hutcherson (born 1992) – actor
- Timothy Hutton (born 1960) – actor (born in Malibu)
- Aldous Huxley (1894–1963) – author (born in England, died in Los Angeles)
- David Henry Hwang (born 1957) – playwright
- Tiffany Hwang (born 1989) – singer (member of pop group Girls' Generation)

== I ==
- Ice Cube (born 1969) – actor, rapper, writer
- Grant Imahara (1970–2020) – electrical engineer, roboticist, and co-host of MythBusters
- Daniel Inocente – architect
- Joe Inoue (born 1985) – singer
- Kiki Iriafen (born 2003) – WNBA player, first round draft pick of the Washington Mystics
- Ashton Irwin (born 1994) – singer-songwriter, musician, member of 5 Seconds of Summer (born in Australia)
- Adena Ishii (born 1990) – mayor of Berkeley, California
- Alex Israel – business executive
- Bob Israel – composer, primarily for silent films
- Nick Itkin (born 1999) – Olympic bronze medalist foil fencer, junior world champion
- Lance Ito (born 1950) – judge, presided over the O. J. Simpson trial

== J ==
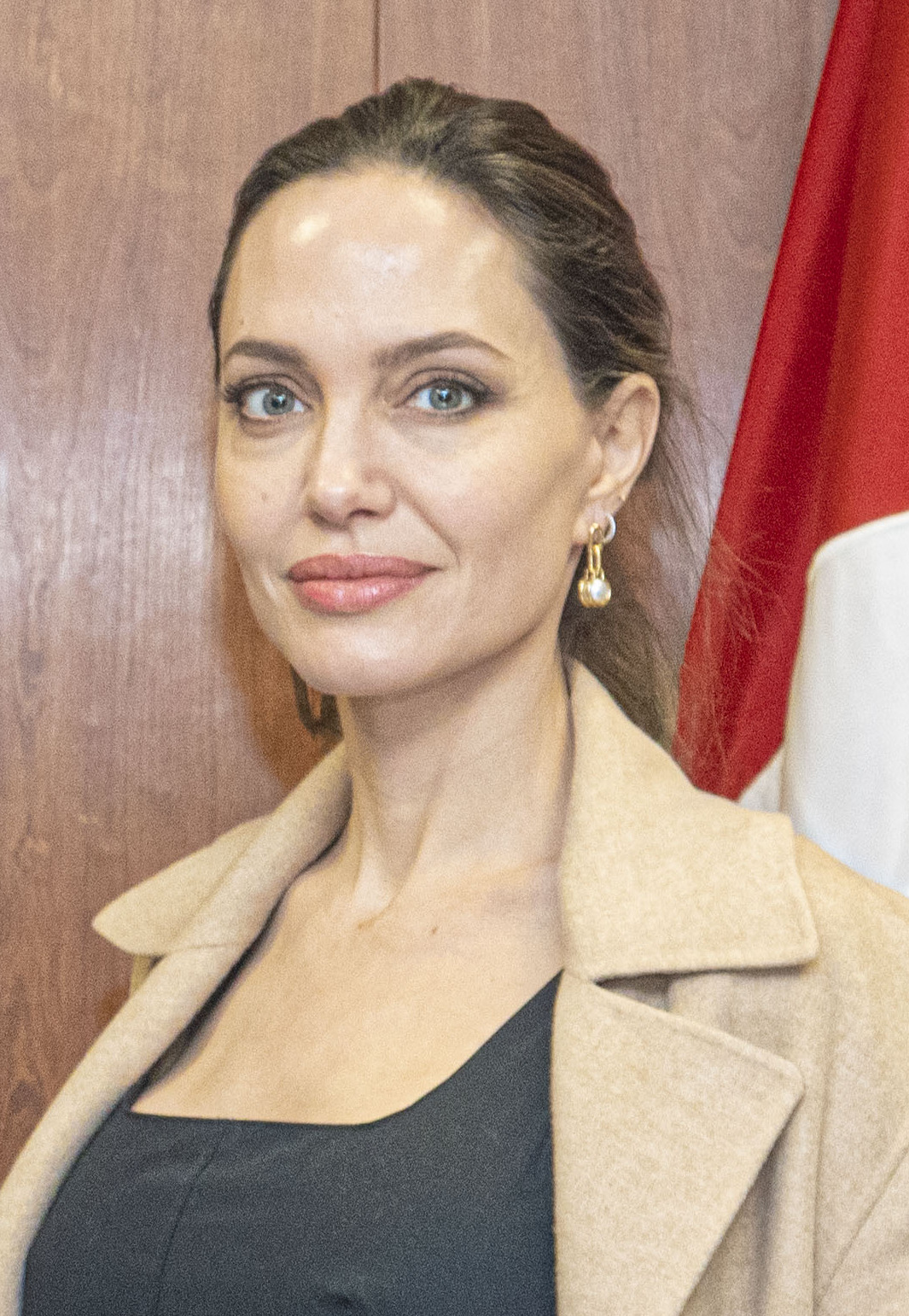
Angelina Jolie

- Hue Jackson (born 1965) – NFL coach
- Melvin Jackson (born 1954) – football player
- Michael Jackson (1934–2022) – L.A. radio personality (born in England)
- Michael Jackson (1958–2009) – singer (born in Gary, Indiana)
- Jonathan Jafari (born 1990) – YouTube personality and co-creator of Game Grumps
- Rami Jaffee (born 1969) – keyboardist for The Wallflowers and Foo Fighters
- Etta James (1938–2012) – singer
- LeBron James (born 1984) – basketball player (born in Ohio)
- Jan and Dean – 1960s singing duo
- Jon Jaques (born 1988) – American-Israeli assistant men's basketball coach for Cornell University; played for Ironi Ashkelon in Israel
- Richard Jefferson (born 1980) – basketball player
- Kendall Jenner (born 1995) – television star, model, celebrity
- Kris Jenner (born 1955) – television star, model, celebrity, manager
- Kylie Jenner (born 1997) – television star, model, celebrity
- Dorothy Vena Johnson (1898–1970) – poet, educator
- Kermit Johnson (born 1952) – football player
- Keyshawn Johnson (born 1972) – football player, TV commentator
- Magic Johnson (born 1959) – Lakers basketball star, Dodgers co-owner (born in Michigan)
- Mike Johnson (born 1969) – wide receivers coach for the Syracuse Orange
- Nora Johnson (1933–2017) – author
- Angelina Jolie (born 1975) – actress
- Jack Jones (born 1938) – singer
- Jerome Jones (born 1981) – hip-hop artist
- Jerry Jones (born 1942) – football executive, owner of the Dallas Cowboys
- Jimmie Jones (1950–2021) – football player
- Marion Jones (born 1975) – track and field athlete, winner of five medals at 2000 Summer Olympics
- Rashida Jones (born 1976) – actress
- Montell Jordan (born 1968) – singer, pastor
- Joshua (born Joshua Hong, 1995) – singer (member of K-pop group Seventeen)
- Florence Griffith Joyner (1959–1998) – athlete, Olympic gold medalist
- Ashley Judd (born 1968) – actress (born in Granada Hills)
- Nicole Jung (born 1991) – member of South Korean girl group KARA
- Bob Jury (born 1955) – NFL player
- Victoria Justice (born 1993) – actress, singer (originally from Hollywood, Florida)

== K ==
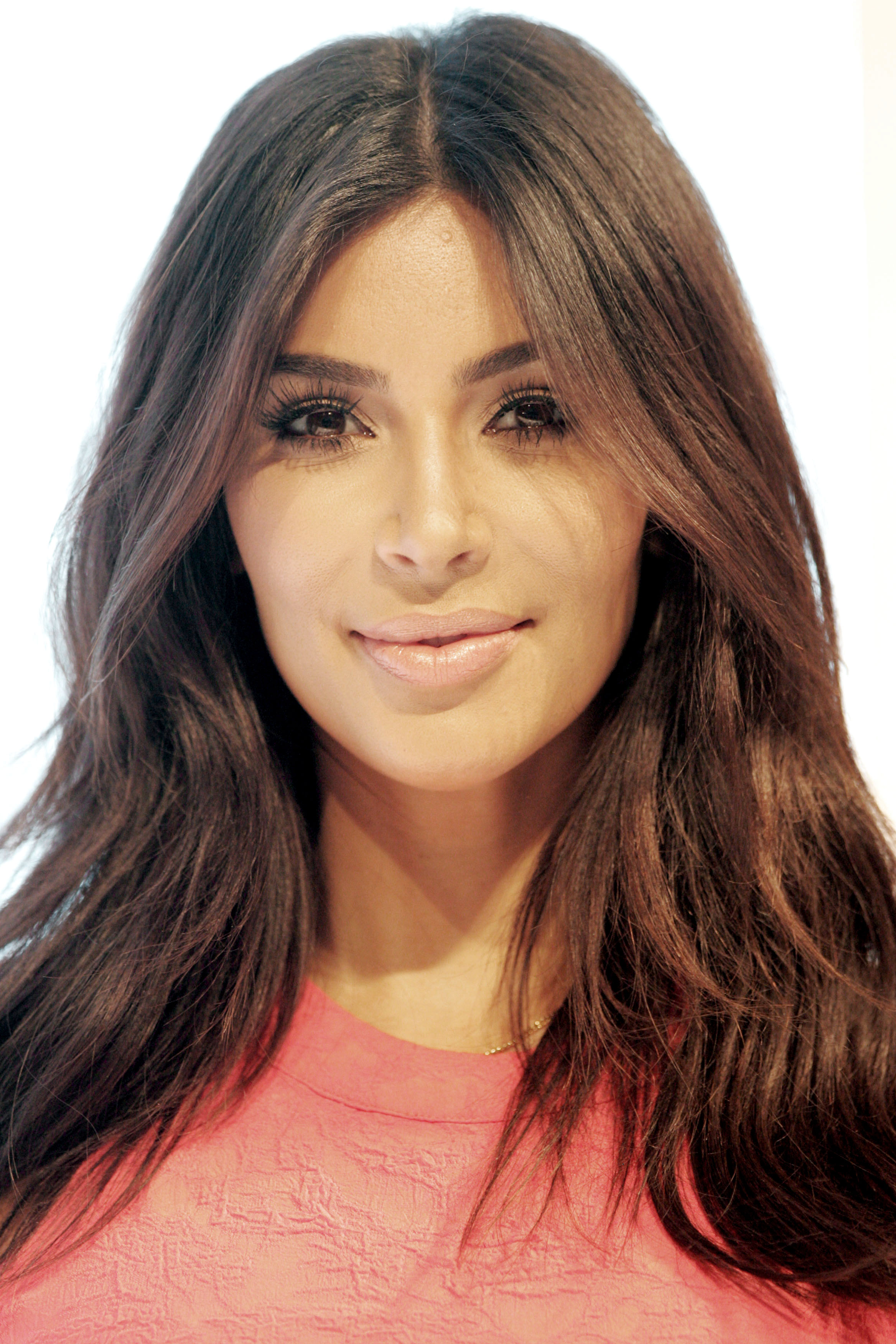
Kim Kardashian

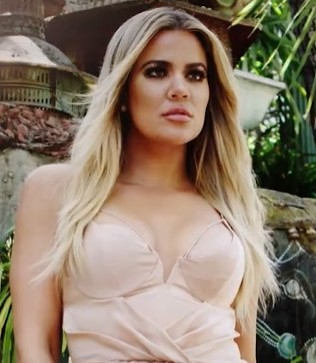
Khloé Kardashian

- Richard Kahn (1929–2025) – marketing executive, former president of the Academy of Motion Picture Arts and Sciences
- Travis Kalanick (born 1976) – businessman, co-founder and former CEO of Uber
- Ryan Kalish (born 1988) – baseball player
- Diop Kamau (born 1958) – civil rights activist
- Sydney Kamlager-Dove (born 1972) – U.S. congresswoman, former California senator, California assemblywoman, and Los Angeles Community College District trustee
- Gabe Kapler (born 1975) – baseball player, and manager (San Francisco Giants)
- Khloé Kardashian (born 1984) – socialite, model, actress and television star (born, raised, and lives in Los Angeles)
- Kim Kardashian (born 1980) – socialite, model, actress and television star (born, raised, and lives in Los Angeles)
- Kourtney Kardashian (born 1979) – socialite, model, actress and television star (born, raised, and lives in Los Angeles)
- Rakel Karvelsson (born 1977) – soccer player who represented the Iceland national team
- William Katt (born 1951) – actor
- Chris Kattan (born 1970) – actor, comedian
- Julie Kavner (born 1950) – actress, voice actor
- Zoe Kazan (born 1983) – actress
- KBeaZy (born 2001) – record producer and YouTuber (originally from Kalamazoo, Michigan)
- Diane Keaton (1946–2025) – actress
- Keb' Mo' (born 1951) – blues singer, guitarist, songwriter
- Val Keckin (born 1938) – football player
- Andrew Keegan (born 1979) – actor
- Minka Kelly (born 1980) – actress
- Jack Kemp (1935–2009) – football player, politician
- Anna Kendrick (born 1985) – actress, singer (originally from Portland, Maine)
- Dom Kennedy (born 1984) – rapper
- Kesha (born 1987) – singer-songwriter
- Asa Keyes (1877–1934) – LA County district attorney and criminal
- Val Kilmer (born 1959–2025) – actor
- Elle King (born 1989) – singer-songwriter, actress
- Holly King – actress
- Joey King (born 1999) – actress
- Kerry King (born 1964) – guitarist of Slayer
- Paul King (1926–1996) – screenwriter
- Abbot Kinney (1850–1920) – founder of Venice, California
- Jack Kirby (1922–2007) – football player
- Barys Kit (1910–2018) – Belarusian-American rocket scientist
- Erwin Klein (1938–1992) – table tennis player
- Josh Klinghoffer (born 1979) – guitarist of The Red Hot Chili Peppers
- Jimmy Knepper (1927–2003) – jazz musician
- Suge Knight (born 1965) – record producer
- Ty Knott (born 1965) – football coach
- Dave Koz (born 1963) – composer, musician
- E. Jay Krause (1926–2025) – art director and production designer
- Zoe Kravitz (born 1988) – actress
- Patricia Krenwinkel (born 1947) – Manson family member serving life sentence for murder
- Robby Krieger (born 1946) – musician
- Mike Krukow (born 1952) – baseball pitcher
- Candi Kubeck (1961–1996) – captain of ValuJet Flight 592
- Lisa Kudrow (born 1963) – actress
- Sheila Kuehl (born 1941) – actress, politician (priginally from Tulsa, Oklahoma)
- Kyra Kupetsky – voice actress, animator
- Alex Kurtzman (born 1973) – filmmaker
- Henry Kuttner (1915–1958) – writer
- Lily Kwong - model, landscape designer

== L ==
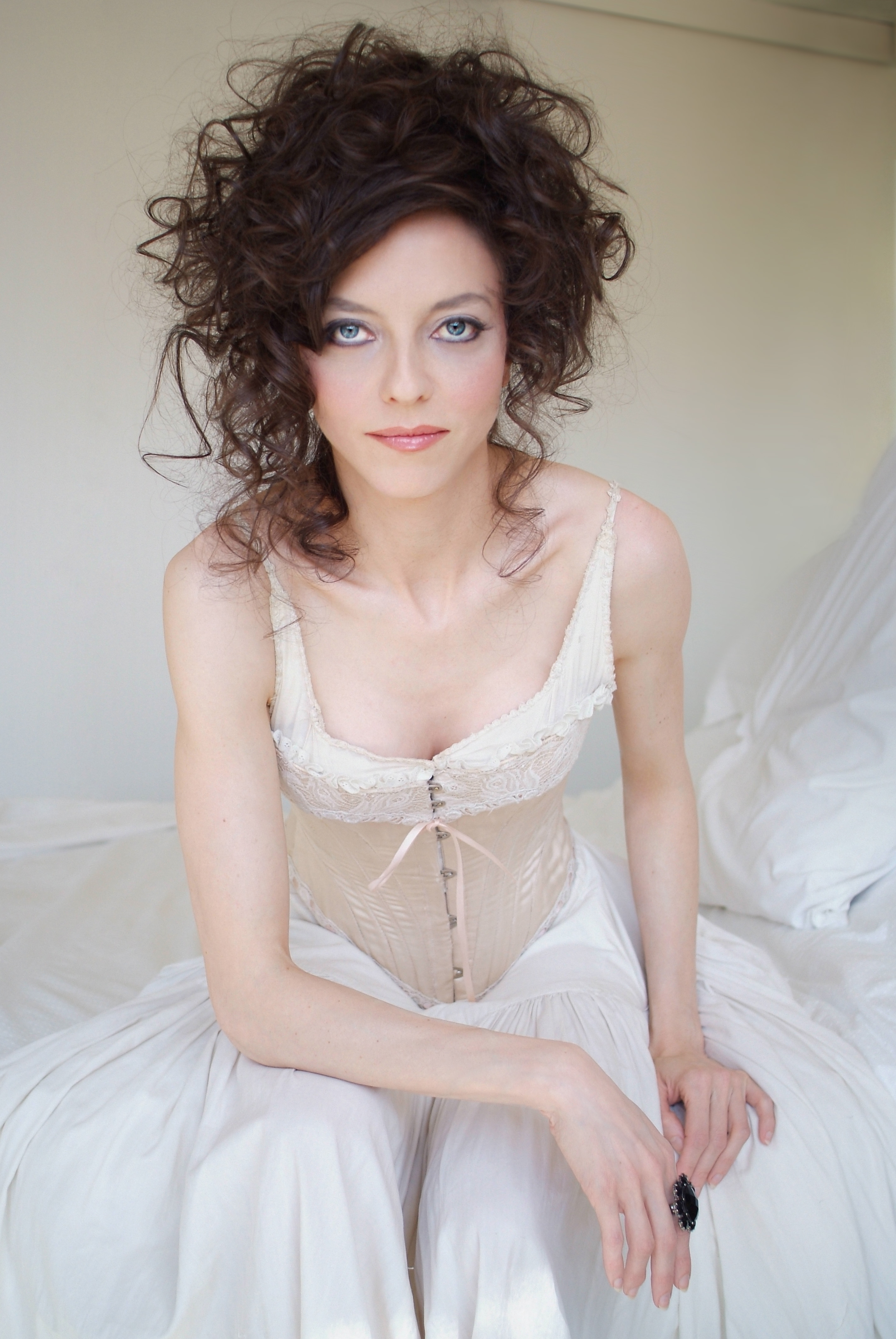
Juliet Landau

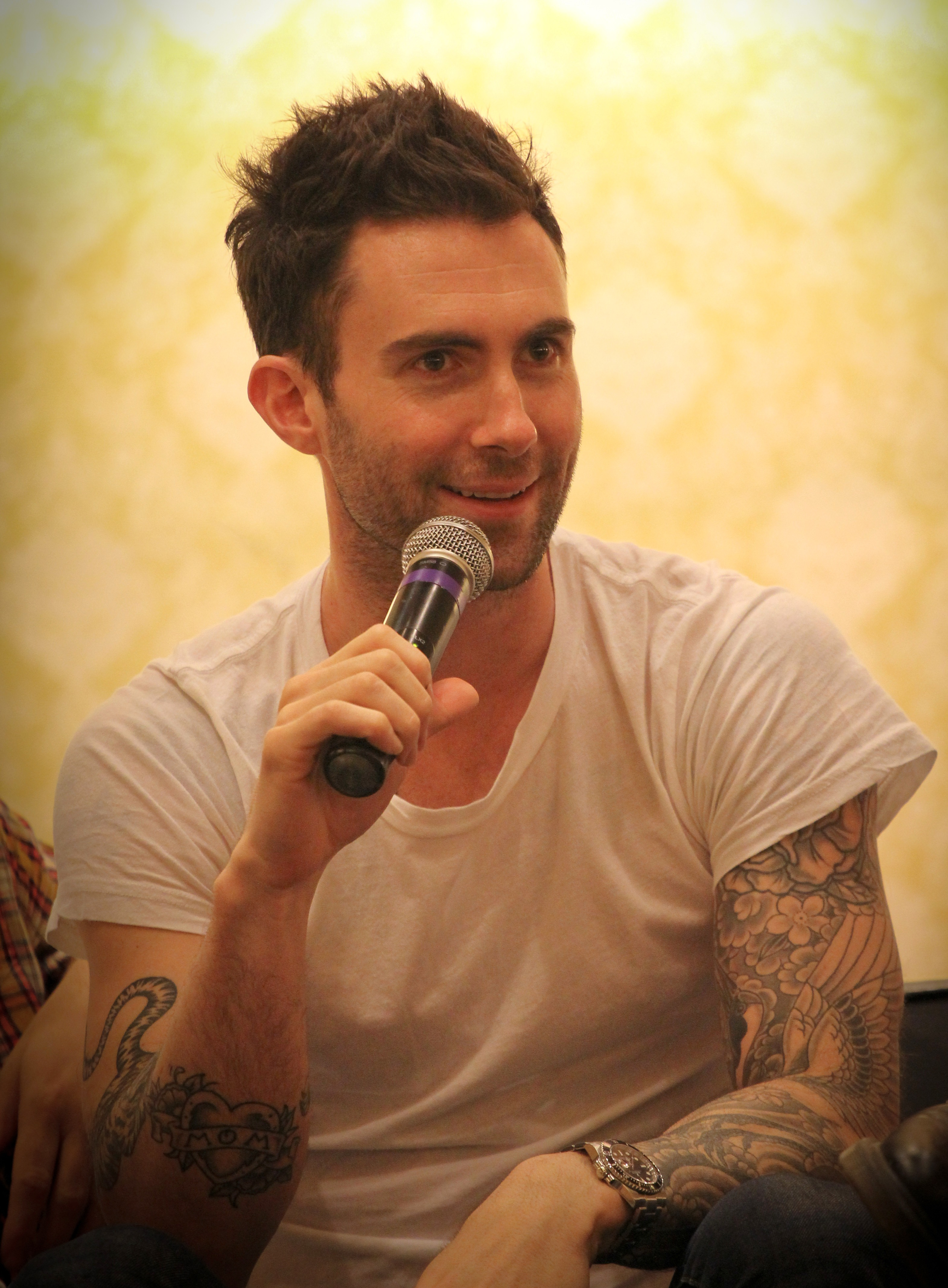
Adam Levine

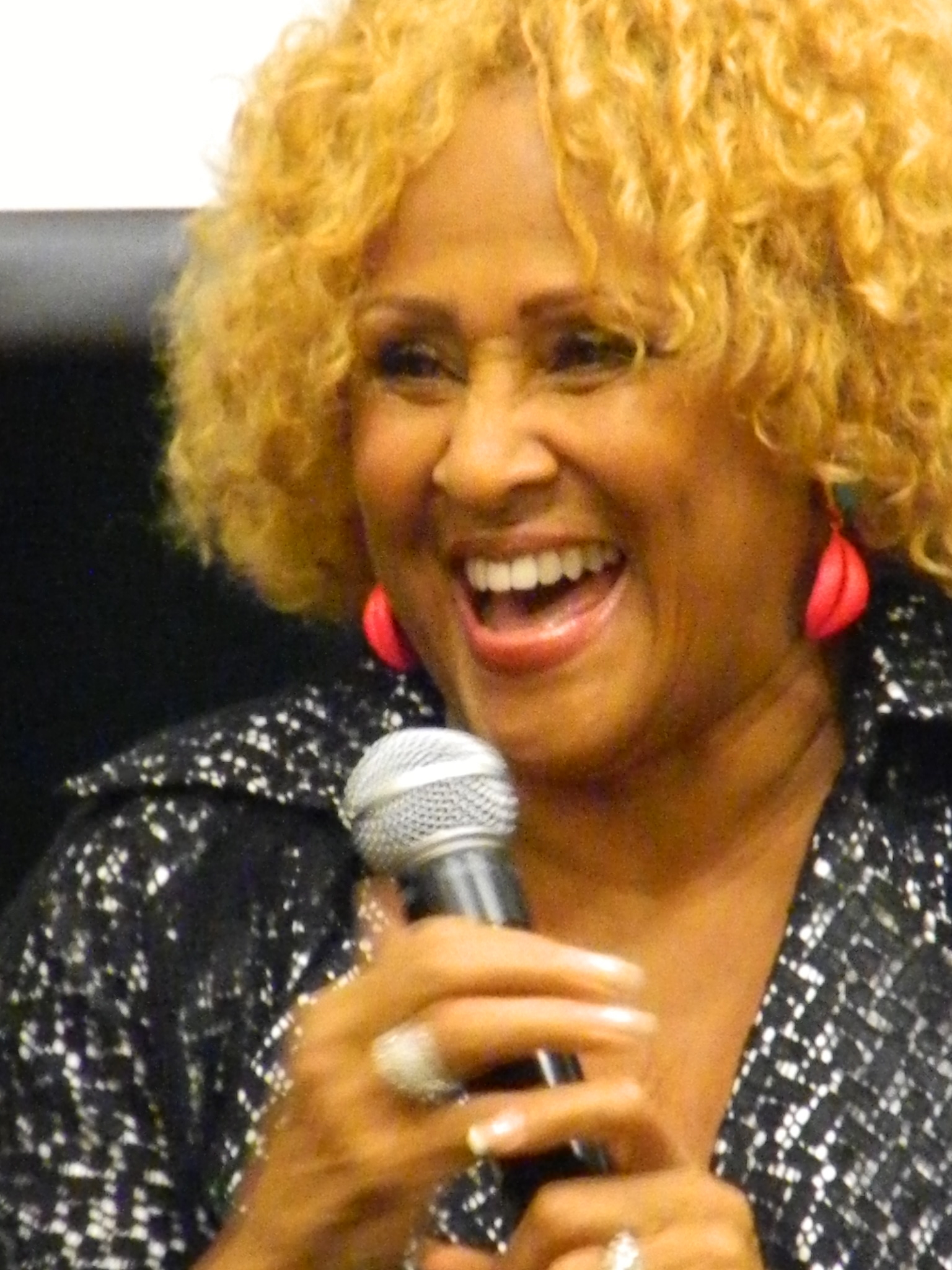
Darlene Love

- Shia LaBeouf (born 1986) – actor
- Matthew Labyorteaux (born 1966) – actor
- Patrick Labyorteaux (born 1965) – actor
- Marcel Lachemann (born 1941) – baseball player and manager
- Rene Lachemann (born 1945) – baseball player and manager
- Alan Ladd (1913–1964) – actor (born in Hot Springs, Arkansas)
- Alan Ladd Jr. (1937–2022) – film director, film producer
- John Lahr (born 1941) – critic
- Kendrick Lamar (born 1987) – rapper
- Phil LaMarr (born 1967) – voice actor, comedian, and writer
- Bill Lancaster (1947–1997) – screenwriter
- Juliet Landau (born 1965) – actress
- Christopher B. Landon (born 1975) – screenwriter
- Ken Landreaux (born 1954) – baseball player
- Mitchell Landsberg (born 1953) – journalist
- Tom Lasorda (1927–2021) – Hall of Fame Dodgers manager (born in Pennsylvania)
- John Lasseter (born 1957) – film director
- Barry Latman (1936–2019) – baseball player
- Dyanna Lauren (born 1965) – erotic dancer, pornographic actress, singer and director
- Bianca Lawson (born 1979) – actress
- Cheche Lazaro (born 1945) – journalist
- Red Leather – country/rock musician (born in Reno, Nevada)
- Annie LeBlanc (born 2004) – actress (originally from Augusta, Georgia)
- Jason Scott Lee (born 1966) – actor
- Michele Lee (born 1942) – actress
- Cassy Legaspi (born 2001) – actress
- Mavy Legaspi (born 2001) – actor
- Janet Leigh (1927–2004) – actress (born in Merced)
- Jennifer Jason Leigh (born 1962) – actress
- Chris Lemmon (born 1954) – actor
- Peter M. Lenkov (born 1964) – writer, producer
- Kay Lenz (born 1953) – actress
- Kawhi Leonard (born 1991) – basketball player
- Logan Lerman (born 1992) – actor
- Lisa Leslie (born 1972) – USC and Sparks basketball player
- Jared Leto (born 1971) – actor, musician; frontman of 30 Seconds To Mars (originally from Bossier City, Louisiana)
- Shannon Leto (born 1970) – musician; brother of Jared (originally from Bossier City, Louisiana)
- Elyse Levesque (born 1985) – Canadian actress (originally from Regina, Saskatchewan, Canada)
- Harvey Levin (born 1950) – founder of TMZ
- Adam Levine (born 1979) – lead singer of Maroon 5
- Jane Levy (born 1989) – actress
- Gary Lewis (born 1945) – musician
- Harry Lewis (1920–2013) – actor, restaurateur
- Juliette Lewis (born 1973) – actress
- Louise Lieberman (born 1977) – soccer coach and former player
- Allan Linder – visual artist
- Audra Lindley (1918–1997) – actress
- David Lipsky (born 1988) – golfer
- Amber Liu (born 1992) – member of South Korean girl group F(x)
- Blake Lively (born 1987) – actress
- Barry Livingston (born 1953) – veteran actor
- Cher Lloyd (born 1993) – singer (originally from Malvern, Worcestershire, England)
- Daniel Lobell – stand-up comedian, podcaster (born in New York City)
- Tone Loc (born 1966) – rapper, actor
- Heather Locklear (born 1961) – actress
- Gary Lockwood (born 1937) – actor (born in Van Nuys)
- John "Juke" Logan (1946–2013) – harmonica player, songwriter
- Julie London (1926–2000) – singer, actress
- Lauren London (born 1984) – actress
- Jennifer Lopez (born 1969) – singer, actress (originally from New York City)
- Manuel López – artist, educator
- Steve Lopez – columnist for the Los Angeles Times
- Billie Lourd (born 1992) – actress
- Demi Lovato (born 1992) – singer, actress (originally from Albuquerque, New Mexico)
- Darlene Love (born 1941) – singer and actress
- Kevin Love (born 1988) – basketball player (born in Santa Monica)
- Madison Love (born 1995) – songwriter, singer
- Mike Love (born 1941) – singer for the Beach Boys
- Jon Lovitz (born 1957) – actor
- Charles Herbert Lowe (1920–2002) – biologist
- John Owen Lowe (born 1995) – actor
- Steve Lukather (born 1957) – musician
- Diana Lynn (1926–1971) – actress

== M ==
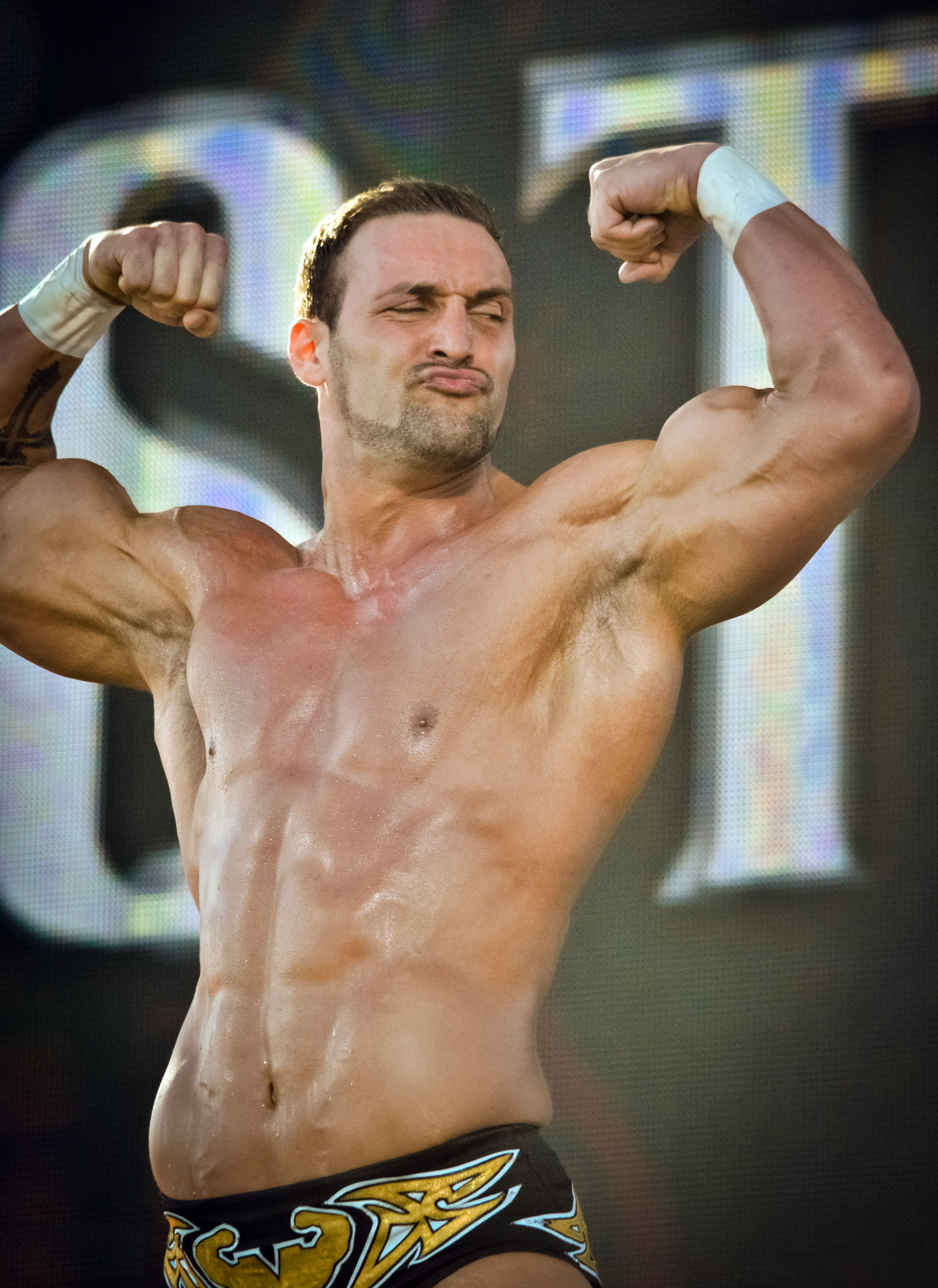
Chris Masters

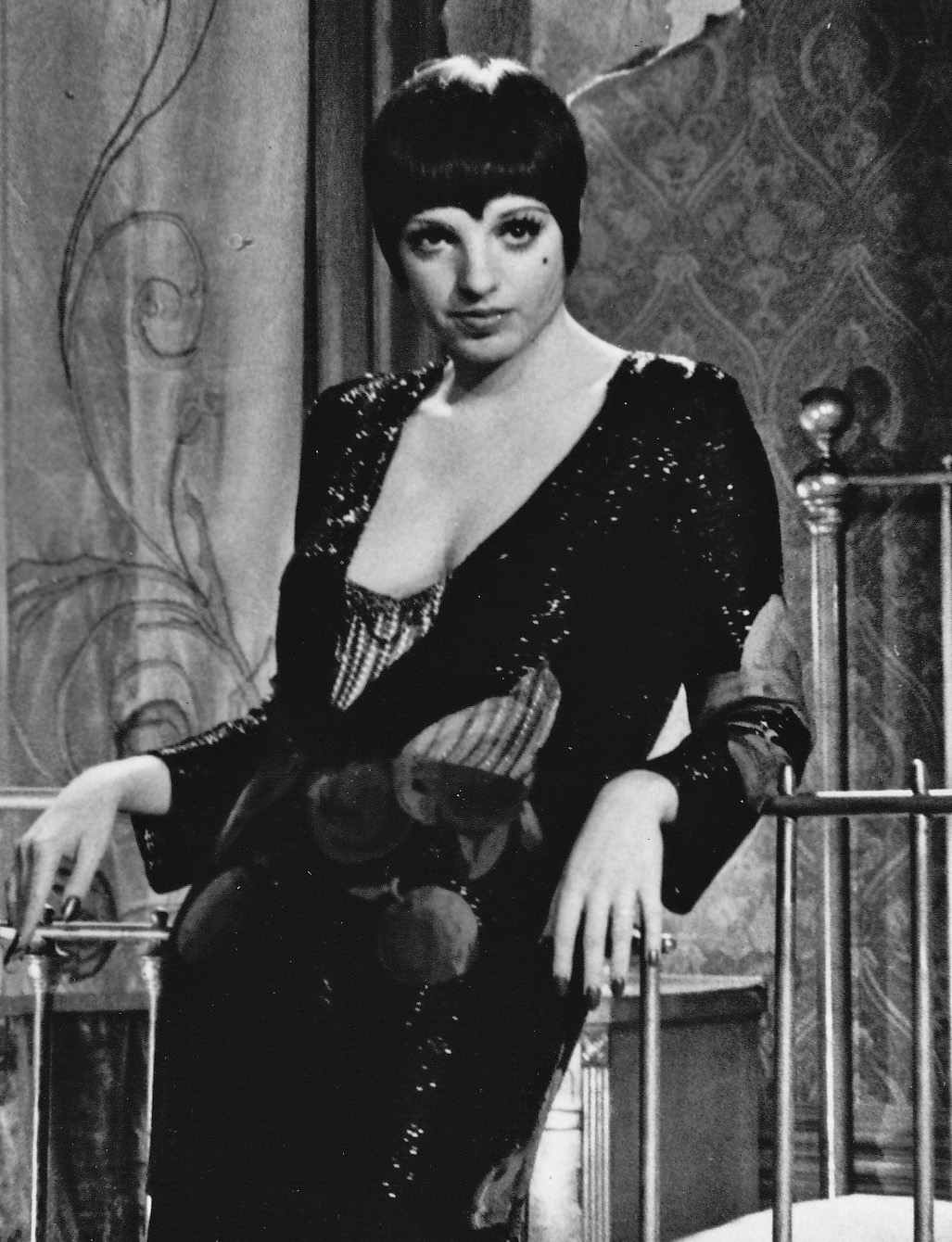
Liza Minnelli

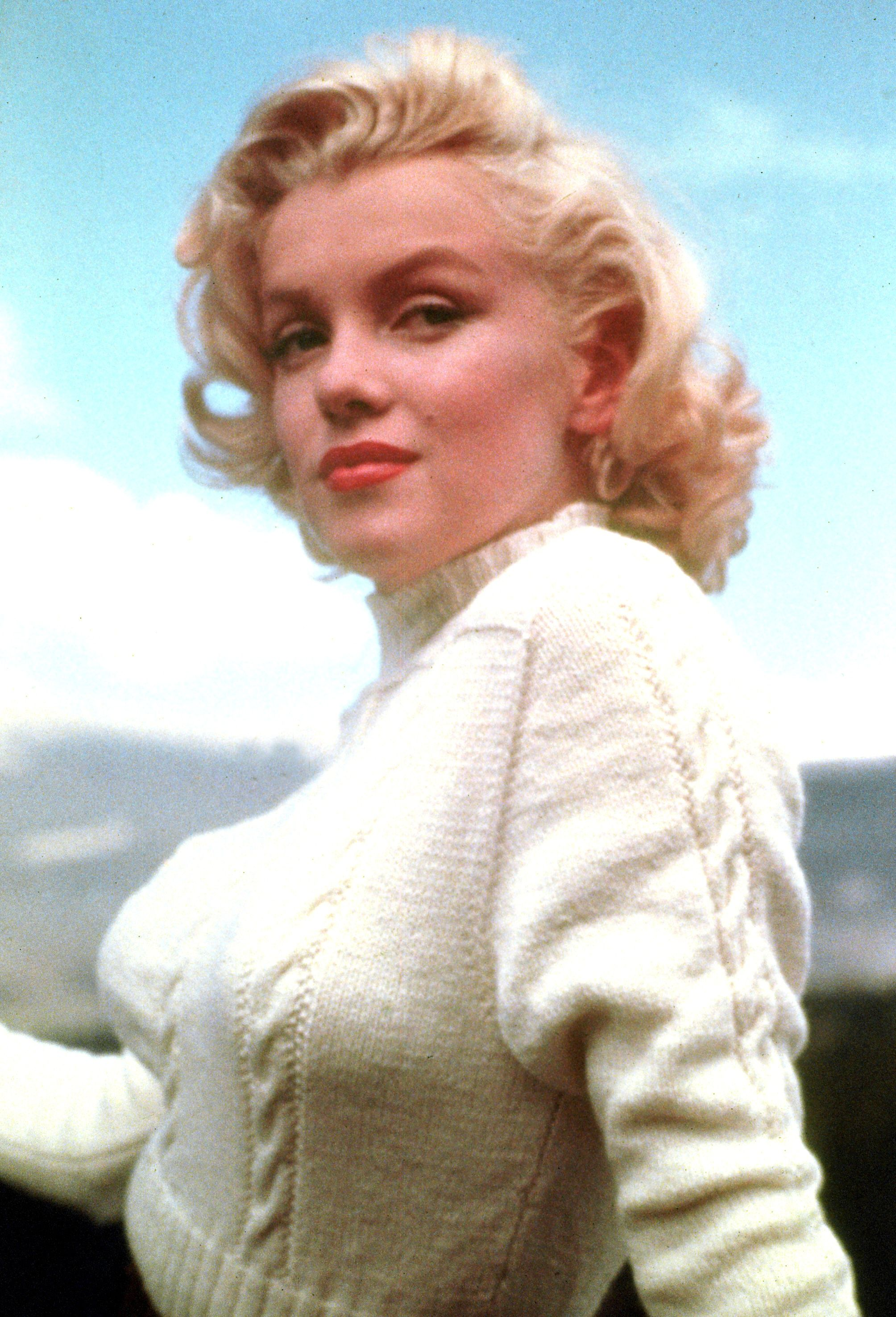
Marilyn Monroe

- James MacArthur (1937–2010) – actor
- John F. MacArthur (born 1939) – pastor
- Tress MacNielle (born 1951) – voice actress
- Richard Madden (born 1986) – actor (originally from Elderslie, Renfrewshire, Scotland)
- Mía Maestro (born 1978) – Argentine actress and singer-songwriter (originally from Buenos Aires, Argentina)
- Bobby Magallanes (born 1969) – Minor League Baseball player, coach, and manager; currently assistant hitting coach for the Atlanta Braves
- Hugh Maguire (1933–2023) – actor
- Roger Mahony (born 1936) – Roman Catholic Archbishop of Los Angeles
- Daron Malakian (born 1975) – musician
- Rami Malek (born 1981) – actor
- Titus Makin Jr. – actor, singer, dancer
- Bruce Manson (born 1956) – tennis player
- Laura Marano (born 1995) – actress
- Vanessa Marano (born 1992) – actress
- Cindy Margolis (born 1965) – spokesmodel and actress
- Xolo Maridueña (born 2001) – actor
- Cheech Marin (born 1946) – comedian, musician, actor
- Mozhan Marnò (born 1980) – television actress
- Jordan Maron (born 1992) – YouTube personality
- Rayah Marshall (born 2003) – WNBA player
- Dean Paul Martin (1951–1987) – actor (born in Santa Monica)
- Elizabeth Marvel (born 1969) – actress
- Biddy Mason (1818–1891) – pioneer African–American businesswoman
- Morgan Mason (born 1955) – acting chief of protocol of the United States
- Chris Masters (born 1983) – professional wrestler
- Sam Match (1923–2010) – tennis player
- Tim Matheson (born 1947) – actor (born in Glendale)
- Greg Mathews (born 1962) – MLB pitcher
- Clay Matthews (born 1986) – pro football player
- Rachel Matthews (born 1993) – actress
- Misty May-Treanor (born 1977) – volleyball player
- Louis B. Mayer (1884–1957) – film mogul (born in Russia)
- Thom Mayne (born 1944) – architect
- Jenn McAllister (born 1996) – Youtuber and actress (originally from Bucks County, Pennsylvania)
- Leo McCarey (1898–1969) – actor, composer, film director, writer, producer
- Bob McChesney (1926–2002) – football player
- Leigh McCloskey (born 1955) – actor, artist
- Gary McCord (born 1948) – golfer, TV commentator (born in San Gabriel)
- Kent McCord (born 1942) – actor
- Maureen McCormick (born 1956) – actress
- Thayne McCulloh (born 1964) – social psychologist, university president
- Hugh McElhenny (1928–2022) – pro football player
- Rod McGaughy (1923–2011) – actor
- Ron McGovney (born 1963) – bassist of Metallica
- Kristy McNichol (born 1962) – actress
- Katharine McPhee (born 1984) – singer, actress
- Aimee Semple McPherson (1890–1944) – pioneering radio evangelist
- Steven McQueen (born 1988) – actor
- Carey McWilliams (1905–1980) – writer, editor
- Meghan, Duchess of Sussex (born 1981) – actress, British royal
- Wendy Melvoin (born 1964) – musician
- Mike Mentzer (1951–2001) – professional bodybuilder and 1979 Mr. Olympia heavyweight champion
- Lee Meriwether (born 1935) – actress, 1955 Miss America
- Russell Metty (1906–1978) – cinematographer
- Jillian Michaels (born 1974) – trainer, TV personality
- Miguel (born 1985) – recording artist
- Michael Milken (born 1946) – financier, philanthropist
- Kevin Millar (born 1971) – baseball player
- Harold Blaine Miller, U.S. Navy official, Eisenhower appointee, pilot, public relations executive, college administrator, and author
- Inger Miller (born 1972) – world and Olympic champion sprinter
- Norm Miller (born 1946) – Major League baseball player
- Penelope Ann Miller (born 1964) – actress
- Leon Milo (1956–2014) – composer, percussionist, sound artist
- Yvette Mimieux (1942–2022) – actress
- Charles Mingus (1922–1979) – jazz bassist and composer (born in Arizona)
- Liza Minnelli (born 1946) – actress, singer
- Christopher Mintz-Plasse (born 1989) – actor
- Donald Miralle (born 1974) – photographer
- Andrew Mishkin – commander of the Mars rover
- Elizabeth Mitchell (born 1970) – actress
- Jamie Mitchell (born 1985) – professional boxer
- Joni Mitchell (born 1943) – singer-songwriter, painter (born in Fort Macleod, Canada)
- Tyrone Mitchell (1955–1984) – murderer
- Christopher Mitchum (born 1943) – actor, writer, film director
- James Mitchum (born 1941) – actor
- Ron Mix (born 1938) – football player
- Jon Miyahara (1941–2025) – actor
- Mike Moffitt (born 1963) – football player
- Peggy Moffitt (1937–2024) – model
- Dick Moje (1927–1989) – football player
- Dianna Molzan – painter
- Marilyn Monroe (1926–1962) – actress
- Elizabeth Montgomery (1933–1995) – actress
- Poppy Montgomery (born 1972) – Australian-American actress (originally from Sydney, Australia)
- Ray Montgomery (1922–1978) – actor
- Peet Montzingo – internet personality and author
- Warren Moon (born 1956) – football player
- Neal Moore (born 1971) – writer, canoeist
- Terry Moore (born 1929) – actress
- Anthony Mora – publicist, playwright
- Lisa Moretti (born 1961) – professional wrestler
- Collin Morikawa (born 1997) – professional golfer
- John Morrison (born 1979) – professional wrestler for WWE
- Patt Morrison – newspaper and radio journalist
- Camila Morrone (born 1997) – actress
- William R. Moses (born 1959) – actor
- Walter Mosley (born 1952) – novelist
- Elisabeth Moss (born 1982) – actress
- Paul Moyer (born 1941) – television newscaster
- William Mulholland (1855–1935) – engineer, DWP pioneer (born in Ireland)
- Megan Mullally (born 1958) – actress
- Bill Mumy (born 1954) – singer and actor
- Michael Murphy (born 1938) – actor
- Don Murray (1929–2024) – actor
- Eddie Murray (born 1956) – professional baseball player
- Jim Murray (1919–1998) – Pulitzer Prize-winning sportswriter (born in Connecticut)
- Lenda Murray (born 1962) – IFBB professional bodybuilder
- Murs (born 1978) – rapper
- Elon Musk (born 1971) – entrepreneur (originally from Pretoria, South Africa)
- Mustard (born 1990) – hip hop producer
- Violet Myers (born 1997) – pornographic actress

== N ==
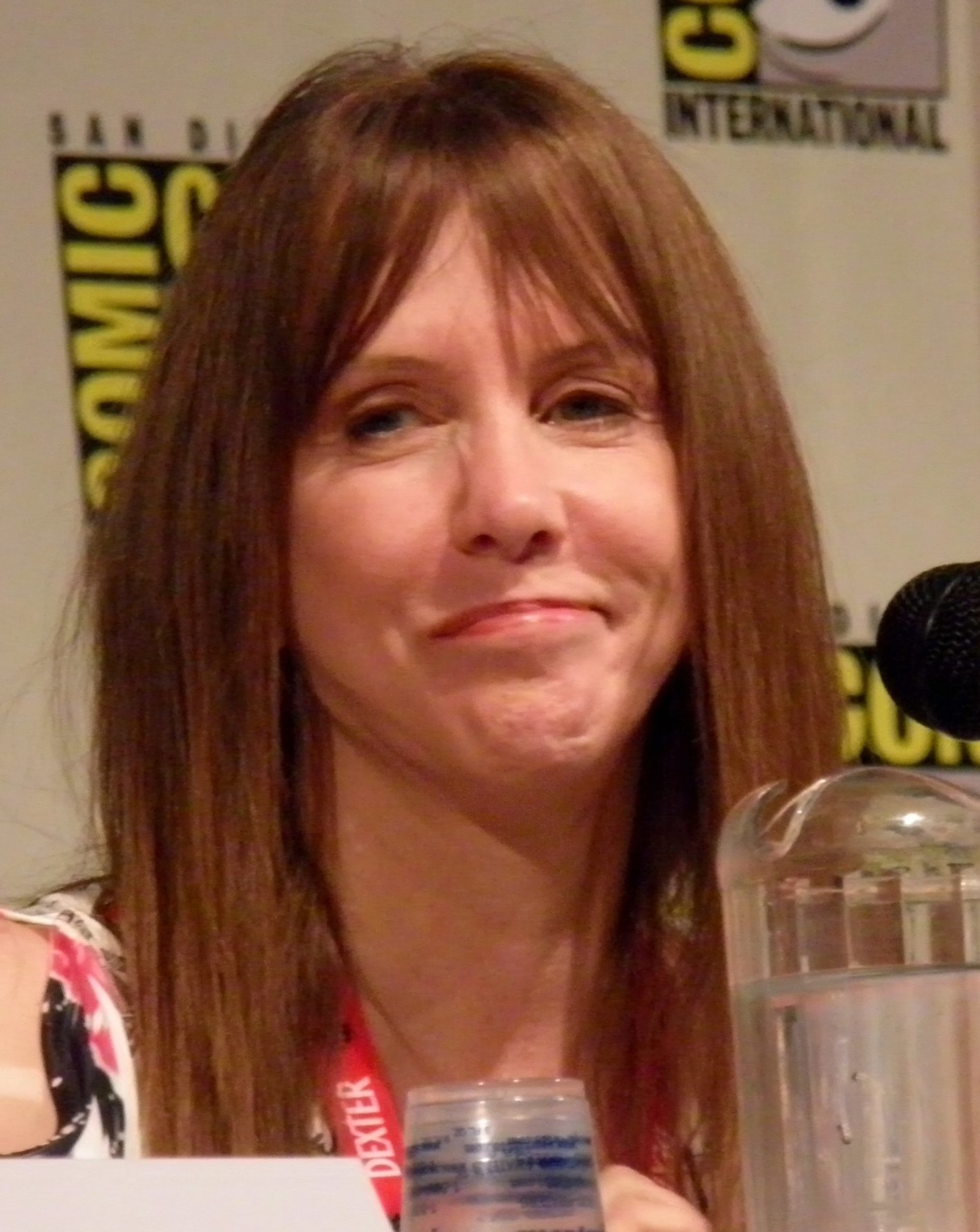
Laraine Newman

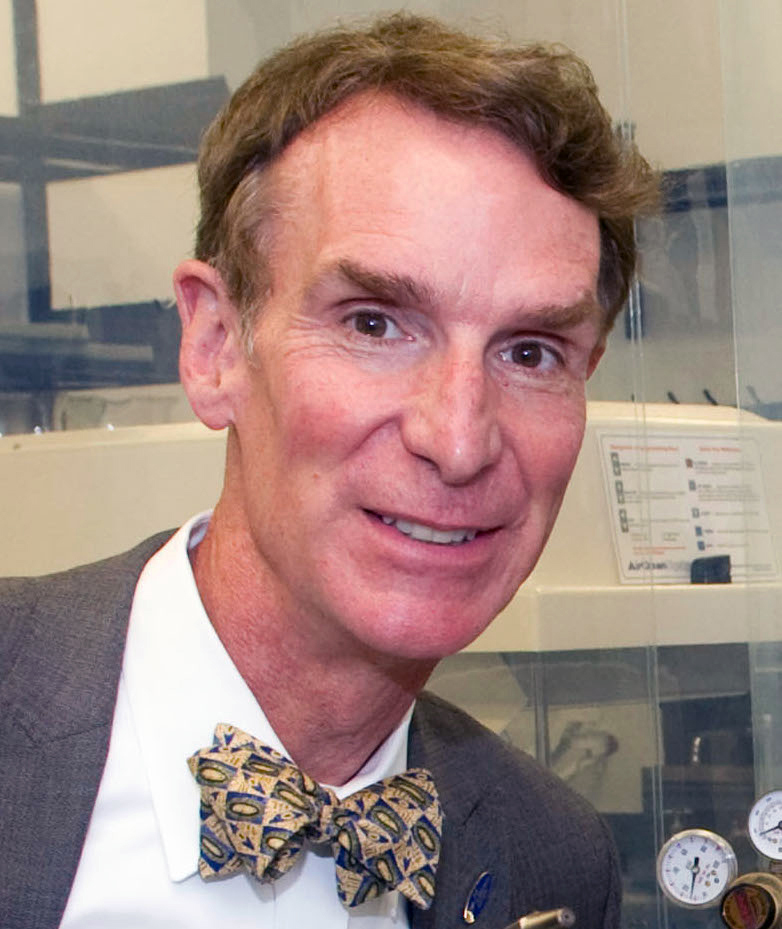
Bill Nye

- Jordan Nagai (born 2000) – child actor
- Stu Nahan (1926–2007) – sportscaster
- Audrey Napoleon (born 1987) – record producer and DJ
- Ricky Nelson (1940–1985) – singer, actor (born in New Jersey)
- Laraine Newman (born 1952) – actress
- Randy Newman (born 1943) – composer, musician
- Thomas Newman (born 1955) – composer
- Julie Newmar (born 1933) – actress
- Mika Newton (born 1986) – singer (born in Burshyn Ukraine)
- Jack Nicholson (born 1937) – actor (born in New Jersey)
- Larry Niven (born 1938) – science-fiction writer
- Richard Nixon (1913–1994) – 36th vice president and 37th president of the United States
- Isamu Noguchi (1904–1988) – artist
- Jeanette Nolan (1911–1998) – actress
- Sheree North (1932–2005) – actress
- Rocco Ríos Novo (born 2002) – soccer player
- Diana Nyad (born 1949) – long-distance swimmer
- Christian Nyby (1913–1993) – film producer, editor, director
- Bill Nye (born 1955) – scientist, TV personality (born in Washington, D.C., resides in Los Angeles)

== O ==
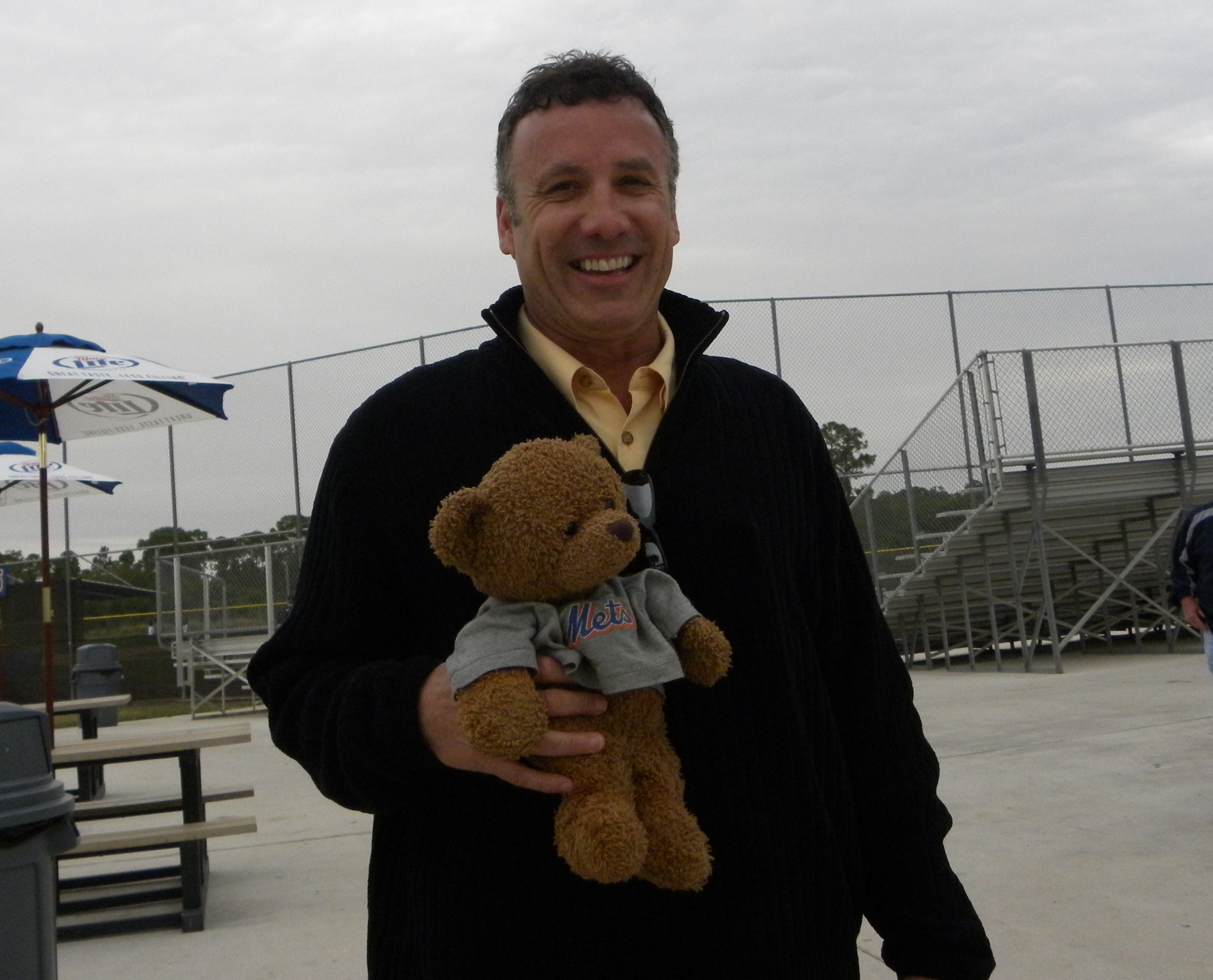
Bobby Ojeda

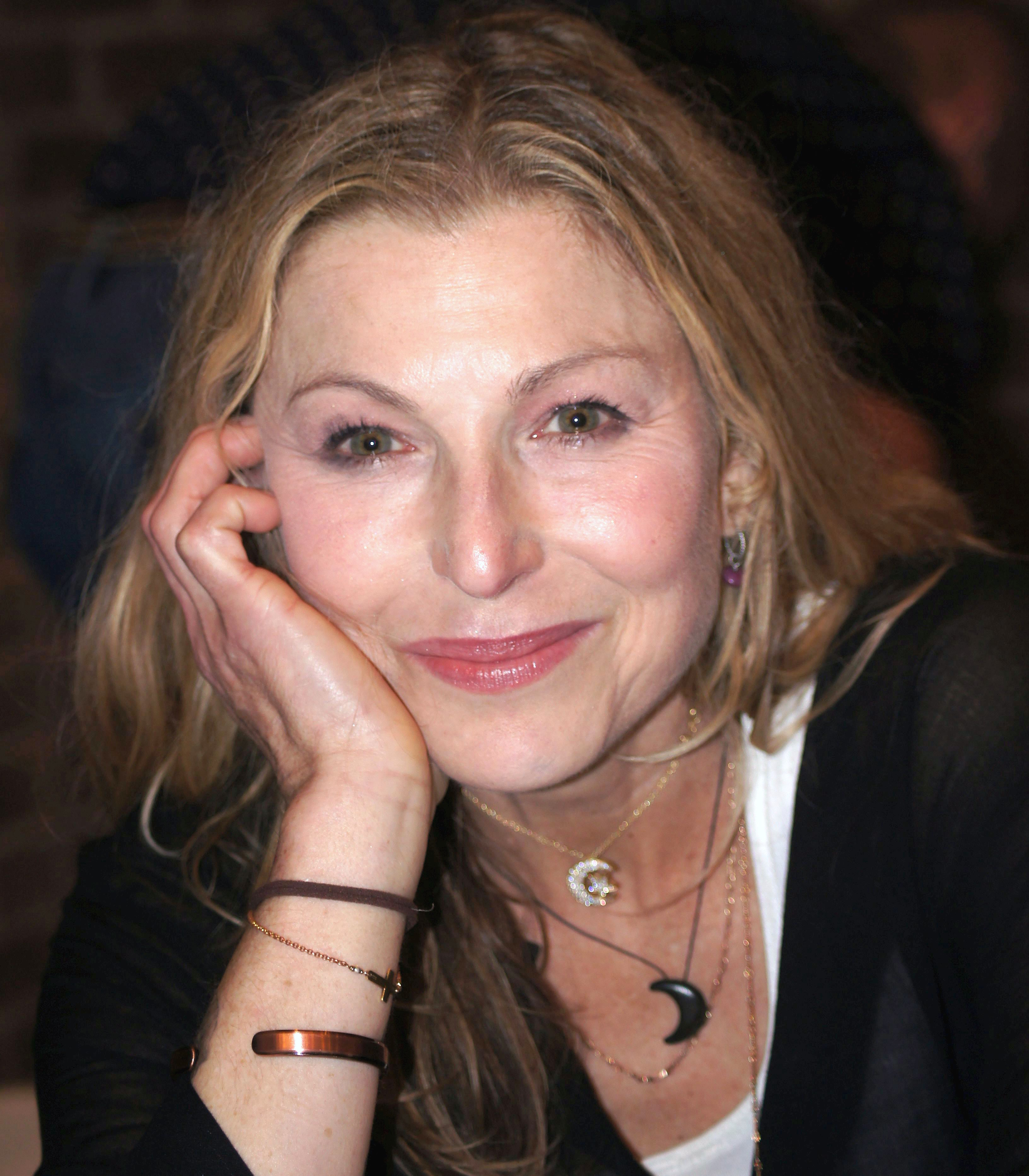
Tatum O'Neal

- Rockne S. O'Bannon (born 1955) – film director, writer, producer
- John O'Brien (born 1977) – football player
- Finneas O'Connell (born 1997) – singer, songwriter, producer
- Susan Louise O'Connor (born 1975) – film, television and stage actress
- Derrick Oden (born 1970) – football player
- OhGeesy (born 1993) – rapper
- Bob Ojeda (born 1957) – baseball player
- Masi Oka (born 1974) – actor
- Onyeka Okongwu (born 2000) – NBA player for the Atlanta Hawks
- Daniel Olivas (born 1959) – author, book critic, attorney
- Barret Oliver (born 1973) – actor, photographer
- Robert Oliveri (born 1978) – former child actor
- Kevin Ollie (born 1972) – basketball coach
- Edward James Olmos (born 1947) – actor, writer, producer, director
- Chris O'Loughlin (born 1967) – Olympic fencer
- Ashley Olsen (born 1986) – actress
- Elizabeth Olsen (born 1989) – actress
- Mary-Kate Olsen (born 1986) – actress
- Judd Omen (born 1940) – actor
- Griffin O'Neal (born 1964) – actor
- Ryan O'Neal (1941–2023) – actor
- Tatum O'Neal (born 1963) – actress
- Wendy C. Ortiz (born 1973) – writer
- Emily Osment (born 1992) – actress
- Haley Joel Osment (born 1988) – actor
- Harrison Gray Otis (1837–1917) – owner and publisher of Los Angeles Times

== P ==
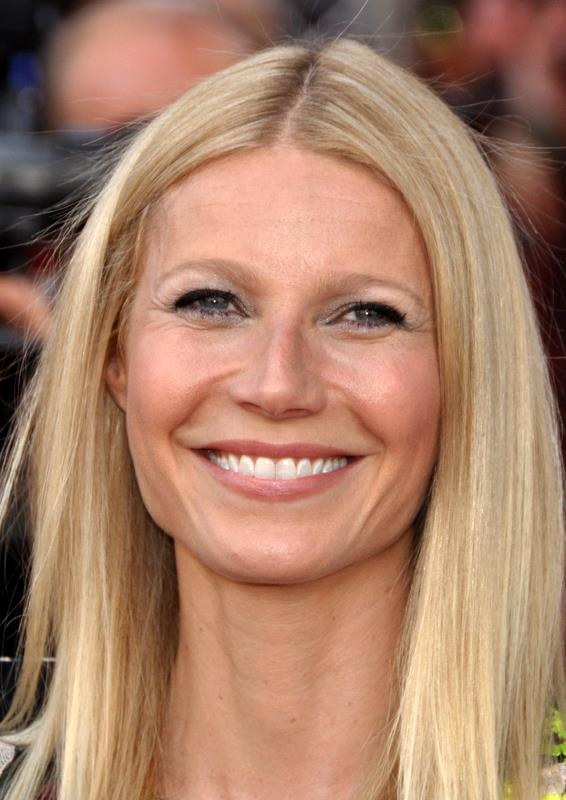
Gwyneth Paltrow

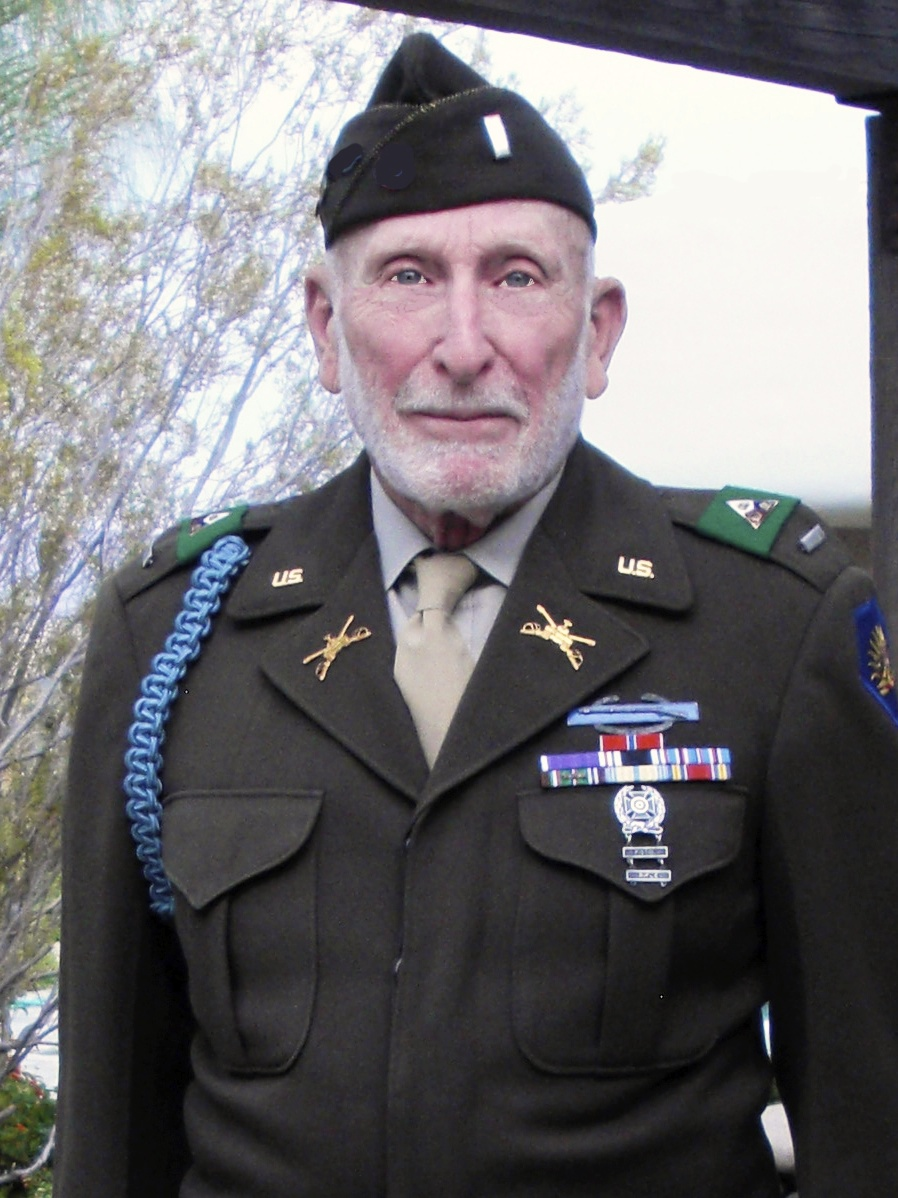
Lt. Donald Prell wearing his WWII U.S. Army uniform in 2009

- Alex Padilla (born 1973) – U.S. senator for California and secretary of state of California
- David Paich (born 1954) – musician
- Gwyneth Paltrow (born 1972) – actress
- Danielle Panabaker (born 1987) – actress (originally from Augusta, Georgia)
- Kay Panabaker (born 1990) – actress and zoologist (originally from Orange, Texas)
- J. D. Pardo (born 1980) – actor
- Grace Park (born 1974) – actress
- Randall Park (born 1974) – actor
- T. Jefferson Parker – novelist
- William H. Parker (1905–1966) – police chief
- Johnnie Parsons (1918–1984) – race car driver
- Ann Patchett (born 1963) – author
- Audrina Patridge (born 1985) – television personality
- Robert Pattinson (born 1986) – actor (originally from London, England)
- Paula Patton (born 1975) – actress
- Sara Paxton (born 1988) – actress
- Gregory Peck (1916–2003) – actor (born in San Diego)
- Mark Pellegrino (born 1965) – actor
- Terry Pendleton (born 1960) – baseball player
- Melina Perez (born 1979) – professional wrestler, former 3X WWE Women's Champion and 2X WWE Divas Champion
- London Perrantes (born 1994) – basketball player for Hapoel Gilboa Galil of the Israeli Basketball Premier League
- Matthew Perry (1969–2023) – actor, comedian (originally from Williamstown, Massachusetts)
- Michelle Perry (born 1979) – athlete, world champion hurdler
- Kim Petras (born 1992) – German singer who moved to Los Angeles at age 19
- Jessica Pettway (1987–2024) – YouTuber
- Jade Pettyjohn (born 2000) – actress
- Chuck Philips (1952–2024) – Pulitzer Prize-winning investigative music journalist
- Chynna Phillips (born 1968) – singer
- Mary Pickford (1892–1979) – actress, co-founder of United Artists and of the Academy of Motion Picture Arts and Sciences (born in Toronto)
- Joy Picus – L.A. city councilwoman and Ms. Magazine woman of the year in 1985 (originally from Chicago, Illinois)
- Spencer Pigot (born 1993) – racing driver
- Hasan Piker (born 1991) – Twitch streamer and political commentator
- Chris Pine (born 1980) – actor
- Ben Platt (born 1993) – actor, comedian
- Eve Plumb (born 1958) – actress (born in Burbank)
- Ivy Pochoda (born 1977) – novelist and former professional squash player (originally from Brooklyn, New York City)
- Stan Poray (1888–1948) – landscape painter (born in Kraków, Poland)
- Mason Porter (born 1976) – mathematician
- Lillian Powell (1896–1992) – dancer, teacher, television actress (originally from Victoria, British Columbia)
- Tyrone Power Jr. (born 1959) – actor
- Stefanie Powers (born 1942) – actress
- Spencer Pratt (born 1983) – television personality
- Donald Prell (1924–2020) – futurologist, author (born in Los Angeles, graduated from LA High and UCLA)
- Bob Prince (1916–1985) – Hall of Fame baseball broadcaster
- Tayshaun Prince (born 1980) – basketball player (born in Compton)
- Freddie Prinze Jr. (born 1976) – actor
- Rain Pryor (born 1969) – actress

== Q ==
- Jack Quaid (born 1992) – actor (The Boys)
- Anthony Quinn (1915–2001) – actor (originally from Chihuahua City, Mexico)
- Noelle Quinn (born 1985) – Unrivaled coach

== R ==
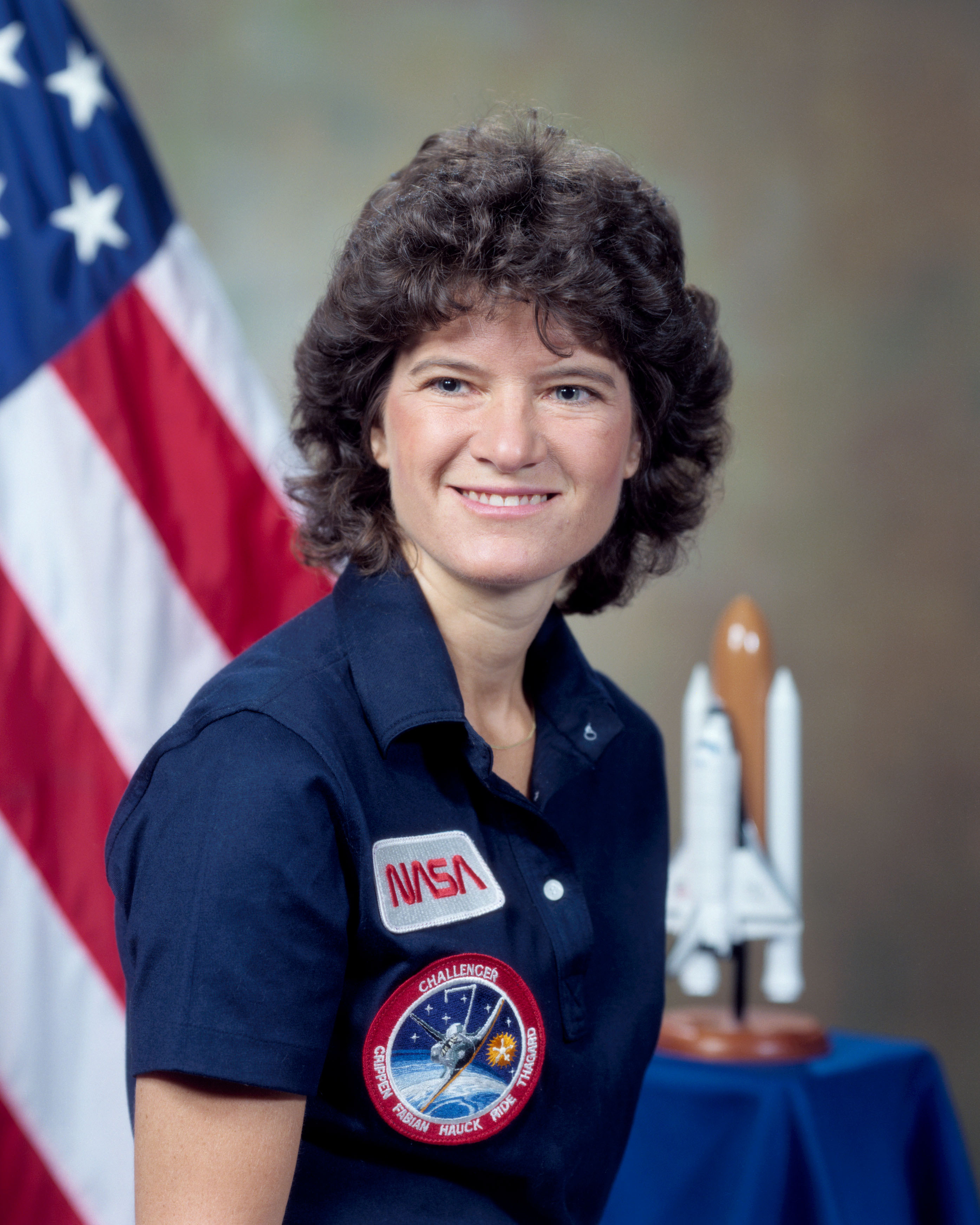
Sally Ride

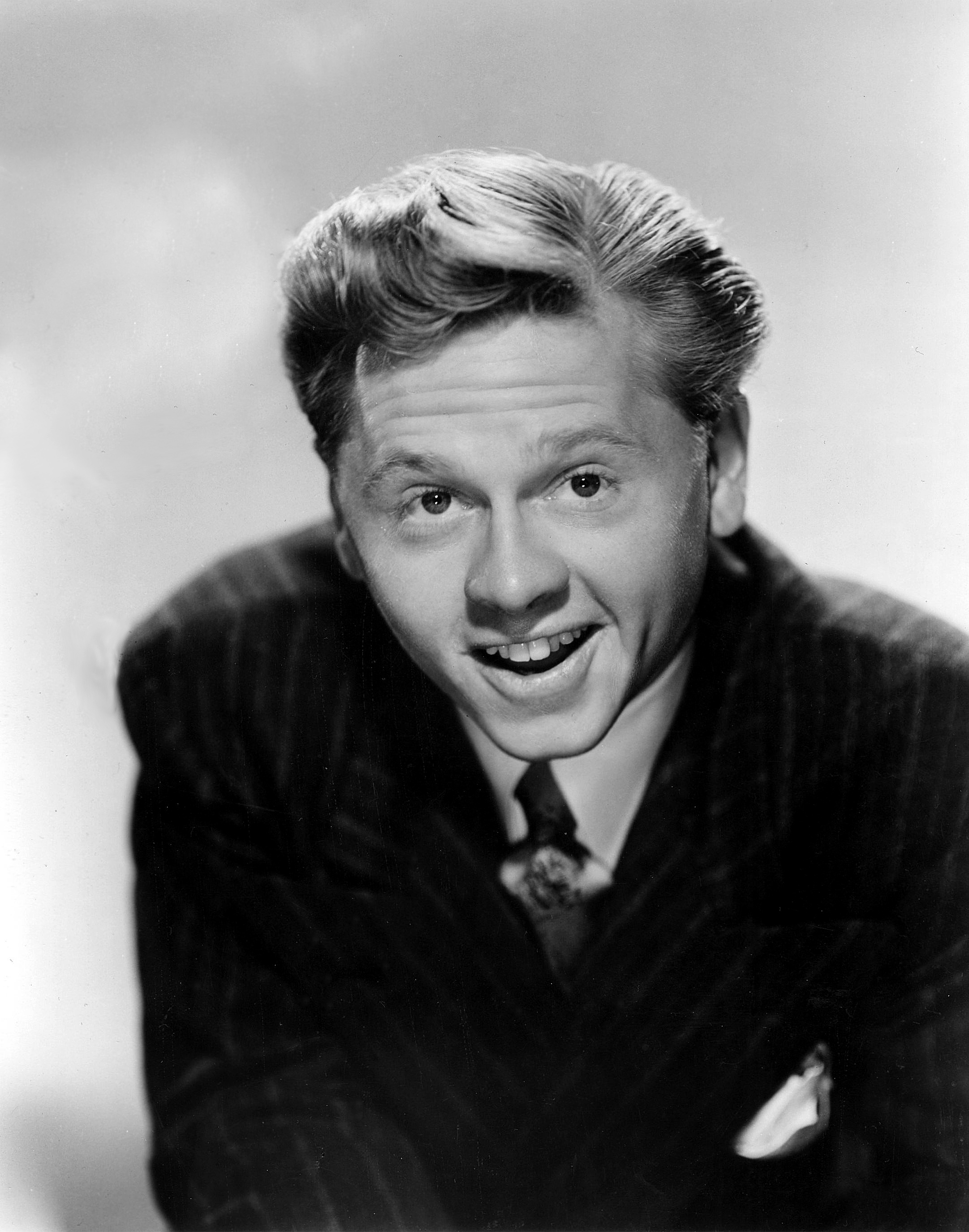
Mickey Rooney

- James Rallison (born 1996) – YouTube animator
- Efren Ramirez (born 1968) – actor
- Jacki Randall – artist
- Dennis Rasmussen (born 1959) – professional baseball player
- Johnnie Ray (1927–1990) – singer-songwriter, pianist
- Tania Raymonde (born 1988) – actress
- Maureen Reagan (1941–2001) – actress, daughter of Ronald Reagan
- Michael Reagan (born 1945) – radio personality, son of Ronald Reagan
- Nancy Reagan (1921–2016) – actress, First Lady (born in New York)
- Ron Reagan (born 1958) – television host, ballet dancer, son of Ronald Reagan
- Ronald Reagan (1911–2004) – actor, president of the United States (born in Illinois)
- Robert Redford (1936–2025) – actor, director (born in Santa Monica)
- Cornelius Redick (born 1964) – NFL player
- Nikki Reed (born 1988) – actress
- Keanu Reeves (born 1964) – actor
- Andy Reid (born 1958) – NFL coach
- Patricia Reif (1930–2002) – theologian
- Debbie Reynolds (1932–2016) – actress (raised in Burbank)
- Harold Rhodes (1910–2000) – inventor of the Rhodes piano
- Giovanni Ribisi (born 1974) – actor
- Robert Ri'chard (born 1983) – actor
- Kyle Richards (born 1969) – television personality
- Christina Ricci (born 1980) – actress (born in Santa Monica)
- Sofia Richie (born 1998) – model
- Sally Ride (1951–2012) – astronaut
- Bobby Riggs (1918–1995) – tennis player
- Amber Riley (born 1986) – actress
- Richard Riordan (1930–2023) – former L.A. mayor
- John Ritter (1948–2003) – actor (born in Burbank)
- Herb Ritts (1952–2002) – photographer
- Luz Rivas (born 1974) – U.S. congresswoman and former California state assemblywoman
- Naya Rivera (1987–2020) – actress, singer
- Clete Roberts (1912–1984) – radio-TV journalist (born in Oregon)
- Joe Roberts (born 1997) – motorcycle racer (born in Malibu, raised in Los Angeles)
- Jackie Robinson (1919–1972) – iconic baseball player (raised in Pasadena)
- Jo Ann Robinson (1912–1992) – civil rights activist
- Edward Ray Robinson (1893–1979) – set decorator
- Rachel Robinson (born 1922) – wife of baseball's Jackie Robinson
- Lela Rochon (born 1964) – actress
- Jay Rock (born 1985) – rapper
- Arabella Page Rodman – civic leader
- Luis J. Rodriguez – writer and activist
- Paul Rodriguez (born 1955) – comedian, actor (born in Compton)
- Paul Rodriguez Jr. (born 1984) – professional skateboarder
- Kay Rohrer (1922–1962) – AAGPBL player
- Mickey Rooney (1920–2014) – actor (born in New York)
- Rosalia (born 1992) – singer
- Gary Ross (born 1956) – film director
- Katharine Ross (born 1940) – actress
- Lawrence Ross (born 1966) – author of historical texts and fiction
- Tracee E. Ross (born 1972) – actress
- Edward R. Roybal (1916–2005) – politician
- Ed Royce (politician) (born 1951) – U.S. congressman and former chairman of the United States House Committee on Foreign Affairs
- Marie Royce – diplomat
- Pete Rozelle (1926–1996) – longtime NFL commissioner
- Ilan Rubin (born 1988) – drummer for Lostprophets, Nine Inch Nails, Danny Elfman, Foo Fighters; youngest inductee in the Rock and Roll Hall of Fame
- John Rubinstein (born 1946) – actor
- Angel Rubio (born 1975) – football player
- Victor Rudd (born 1991) – basketball player for Maccabi Tel Aviv of the Israeli Basketball Premier League and the Euroleague
- Mikel Ruffinelli – record holder for world's largest hips
- Charlie Ruggles (1886–1970) – actor
- Wesley Ruggles (1889–1972) – director, producer
- Patrice Rushen (born 1954) – singer, musician
- Andy Russell (1919–1992) – singer
- Rene Russo (born 1954) – actress (born in Burbank)
- Brendan Ryan (born 1982) – baseball player
- Remy Ryan – actress
- Bonnie Rychlak (born 1951) – sculptor, curator
- Gary Ryerson (born 1948) – baseball player

== S ==
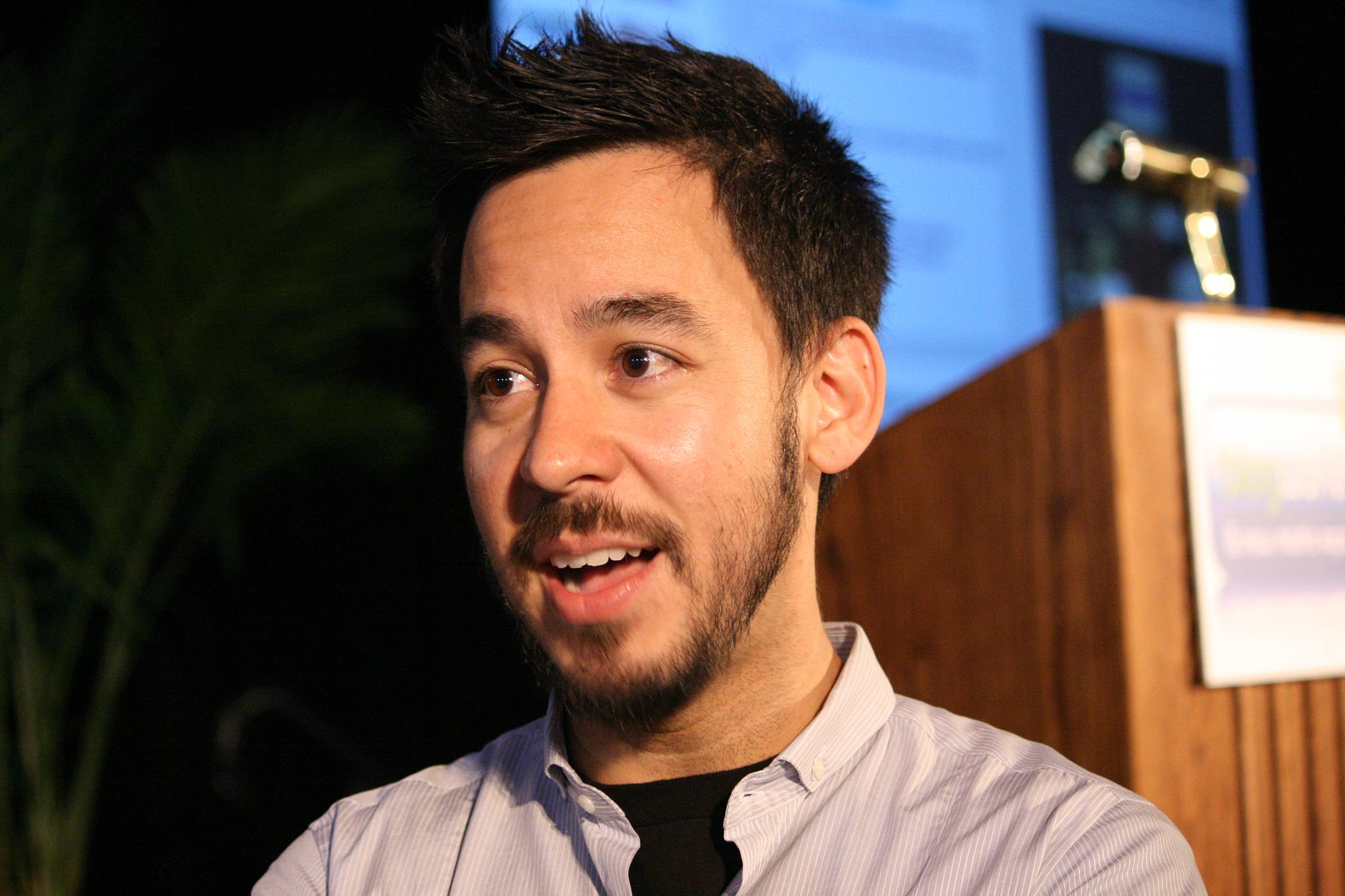
Mike Shinoda

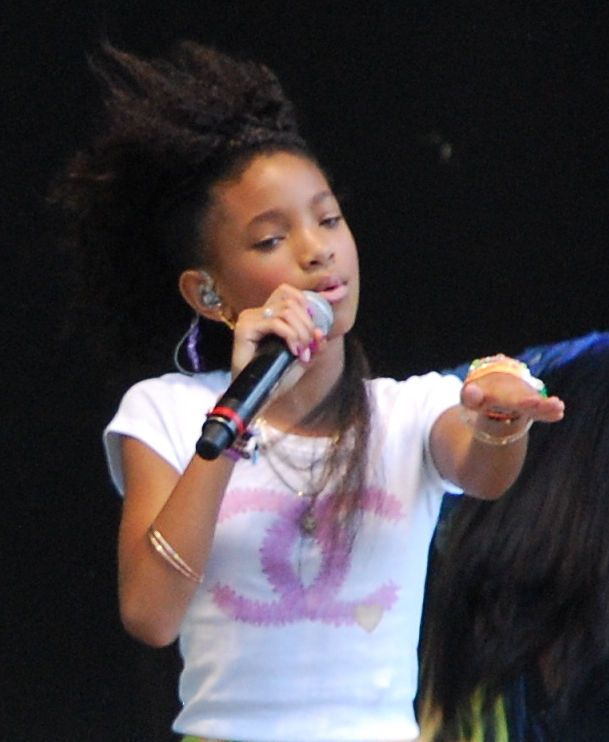
Willow Smith

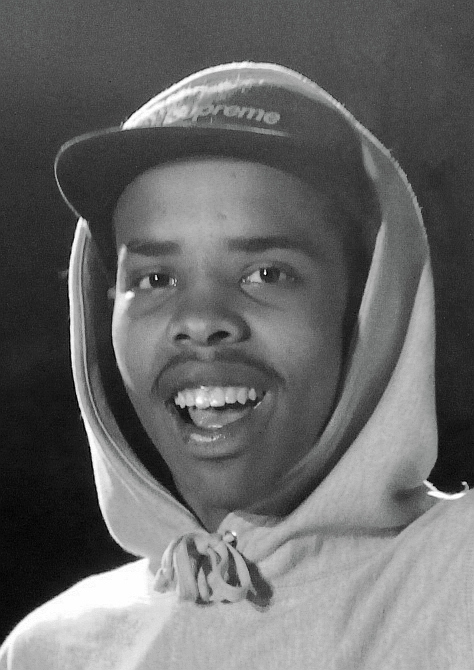
Earl Sweatshirt

- José Saenz (born 1975) – 492nd on the list of FBI Ten Most Wanted Fugitives
- Katey Sagal (born 1954) – actress
- Halston Sage (born 1993) – actress
- Mort Sahl (1927–2021) – comedian
- Albert Saijo (1926–2011) – poet
- Susan Saint James (born 1946) – actress
- Jill St. John (born 1940) – actress
- Adela Rogers St. Johns (1894–1988) – journalist, screenwriter
- Bradford J. Salamon (born 1963) – painter
- Rubén Salazar (1928–1970) – L.A. Times reporter killed by Los Angeles County Sheriff's Department during Chicano Moratorium
- Jim Salsbury (1932–2002) – professional football player
- Samantha Jo (born 1991) – actress, martial artist (born in Barrie, Ontario, Canada)
- Samia (born 1996) – musician
- Jay Sandrich (1932–2021) – film director, film producer
- Donald Sanford (born 1987) – American-Israeli Olympic sprinter
- Angela Sarafyan (born 1983) – Armenian-American actress (originally from Yerevan, Armenia)
- Cosmo Sardo (1909–1989) – actor
- Dick Sargent (1930–1994) – actor
- Ben Savage (born 1980) – actor, director, producer
- Fred Savage (born 1976) – actor, director (born in Illinois)
- William Schallert (1922–2016) – actor
- Lalo Schifrin (1932–2025) – composer
- Peter Schifrin (born 1958) – Olympic fencer, sculptor
- Ezra Schochet – rosh yeshiva, Yeshiva Ohr Elchonon Chabad/West Coast Talmudical Seminary
- Schoolboy Q (born 1986) – rapper
- Kim Schrier (born 1968) – U.S. representative for Washington
- Emily Schulman (born 1977) – actress
- Geoff Schwartz (born 1986) – NFL football player
- Mitchell Schwartz (born 1989) – NFL football player
- Jason Schwartzman (born 1980) – actor, musician
- David Schweikert (born 1962) – U.S. representative from Arizona
- Byron Scott (born 1961) – basketball player and coach (born in Utah)
- Melody Thomas Scott (born 1956) – actress
- Rachel Scott (born 1993) – senior congressional correspondent for ABC News
- Vin Scully (1927–2022) – Dodgers baseball broadcaster (born in New York)
- George Segal (1934–2021) – actor
- Jason Segel (born 1980) – actor
- William Nicholas Selig (1864–1948) – movie producer, zookeeper
- David O. Selznick (1902–1965) – film producer (born in Pennsylvania)
- Eugene Selznick (1930–2012) – Hall of Fame volleyball player
- Adam G. Sevani (born 1992) – actor and dancer
- Parvati Shallow (born 1982) – Survivor contestant; winner of Survivor: Micronesia
- Benjamin Shapiro (born 1984) – conservative political commentator
- Karen Sharpe (born 1934) – actress, wife of director/producer Stanley Kramer
- Melanie Shatner (born 1964) – actress
- Ann Shaw (1921–2015) – social worker, civic leader
- Vinessa Shaw (born 1976) – actress
- Harry Shearer (born 1943) – actor, comedian, musician, composer
- Edna Sheen (1943–2012) – make-up artist
- Marley Shelton (born 1974) – actress
- Eden Sher (born 1991) – actress, comedian
- Brad Sherman (born 1954) – U.S. representative for California
- Richard Sherman (born 1988) – NFL player (born in Compton)
- Larry Sherry (1935–2006) – baseball player, 1959 World Series MVP
- Norm Sherry (1931–2021) – catcher, manager, and coach in Major League Baseball
- Mike Shinoda (born 1977) – musician
- Pauly Shore (born 1968) – comedian and actor
- Elizabeth Short (1924–1947) – the "Black Dahlia", victim of the city's most famous unsolved murder (originally from Boston, Massachusetts)
- Robert "Fighting Bob" Shuler (1880–1965) – Methodist radio evangelist and political player
- Joel Siegel (1943–2007) – film critic
- James Sikking (1934–2024) – actor
- Al Silvera (1935–2002) – Major League Baseball player
- Jonathan Silverman (born 1966) – actor
- Stephen M. Silverman (1951–2023) – journalist/author
- Jerry Simon (born 1968) – American-Israeli basketball player
- Sebu Simonian (born 1978) – Armenian-American singer (priginally from Aleppo, Syria)
- O. J. Simpson (1947–2024) – USC and NFL football player, murder suspect (born in San Francisco)
- Nancy Sinatra (born 1940) – singer, actress (originally from Jersey City, New Jersey)
- Tina Sinatra (born 1948) – producer
- Simon Singer (born 1941) – world champion American handball player, and radio and television actor
- Lilly Singh (born 1988) – YouTuber, comedian, talk show host, actress (originally from Toronto, Canada)
- John Singleton (1968–2019) – film director, writer, producer
- Skrillex (born 1988, real name Sonny Moore) – DJ, producer
- Slash (born 1965) – Guns N' Roses and Velvet Revolver guitarist
- Leonard Slatkin (born 1944) – conductor
- Slayyyter (born 1996) – pop singer and songwriter (originally from St. Louis, Missouri)
- Erika Slezak (born 1946) – actress
- Margaret F. Slusher (1879–1971) – businesswoman
- Pat Smear (born 1959) – guitarist for Germs, Nirvana and Foo Fighters
- Alexis Smith (1921–1993) – actress (originally from Penticton, British Columbia, Canada)
- Steve Smith Sr. (born 1979) – NFL wide receiver
- Willow Smith (born 2000) – singer
- Dick Smothers (born 1938) – entertainer, the Smothers Brothers (born in New York, raised in Los Angeles)
- Tom Smothers (1937–2023) – entertainer, the Smothers Brothers (born in New York, raised in Los Angeles)
- Duke Snider (1926–2011) – Hall of Fame baseball player
- Snoop Dogg (born 1971) – rap artist
- Ted Sobel (born 1953) – sportscaster and author
- Hilda Solis (born 1957) – politician, secretary of labor in the Barack Obama administration
- Paul Soriano (born 1981) – director/producer
- Ron Spears (born 1959) – professional football player
- Tori Spelling (born 1973) – actress
- Evan Spiegel (born 1990) – businessman, co-founder and CEO of Snap Inc.
- Steven Spielberg (born 1946) – filmmaker (born in Cincinnati)
- Robert Stack (1919–2003) – actor
- Lakeith Stanfield (born 1991) – actor
- Anine Stang (born 1985) – Norwegian singer-songwriter (riginally from Oslo, Norway)
- Giancarlo Stanton (born 1989) – baseball player (born in Panorama City)
- Jesse Jo Stark (born 1991) – singer and actress
- Amandla Stenberg (born 1998) – actress
- Hailee Steinfeld (born 1996) – actress (born in Tarzana)
- Stephanie (born 1987) – singer
- Brett Sterling (born 1984) – NHL hockey player
- Donald Sterling (born 1934) – longtime owner of Los Angeles Clippers
- Tisha Sterling (born 1944) – actress
- Adlai E. Stevenson II (1900–1965) – politician
- Jamie Stewart (born 1978) – musician, frontman of experimental band Xiu Xiu
- Kristen Stewart (born 1990) – actress
- Lindsey Stirling (born 1986) – violinist
- Dean Stockwell (1936–2021) – actor
- Emma Stone (born 1988) – actress (originally from Scottsdale, Arizona)
- Peter Stone (1930–2003) – screenwriter
- Madeleine Stowe (born 1958) – actress
- Darryl Strawberry (born 1962) – baseball player
- Catherine A. Streeter (1873–1950), businesswoman, gaming expert
- Woody Strode (1914–1994) – actor
- Rider Strong (born 1979) – actor, director
- David Strother – musician
- Jeff Stryker – pornographic film actor
- Rachel Stubington – actress
- Burt Sugarman (born 1939) – film and TV producer
- Brick Sullivan (1899–1959) – actor
- Frank Sullivan (1930–2016) – MLB pitcher
- Cree Summer (born 1969) – actress
- Angus Sutherland (born 1982) – producer/actor
- Dale Swann (1948–2009) – character actor
- Earl Sweatshirt (born 1994) – rapper, member of OFWGKTA
- Alison Sweeney (born 1976) – actress
- Jodie Sweetin (born 1982) – actress
- Jo Swerling Jr. (born 1931) – director, producer and screenwriter

== T ==
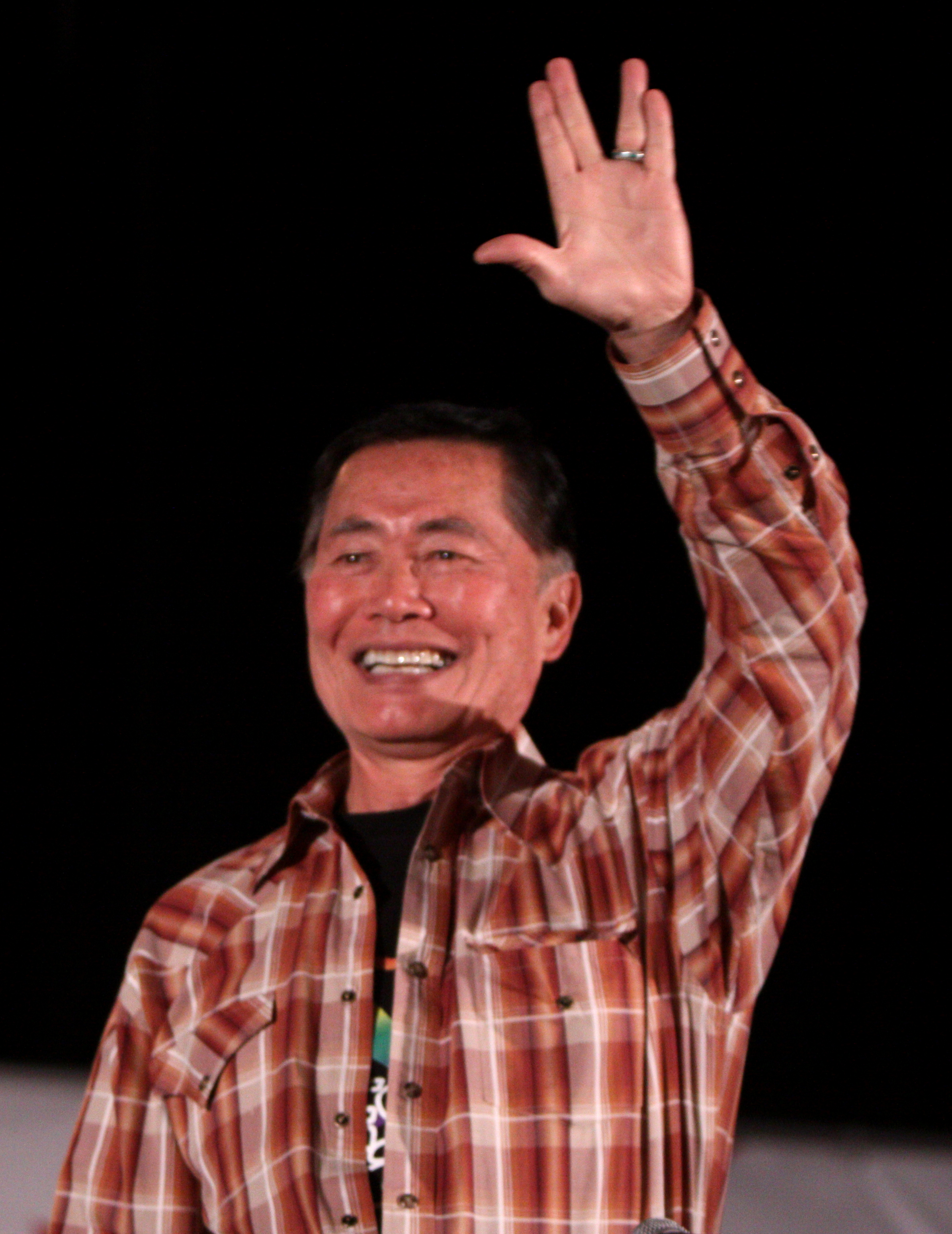
George Takei

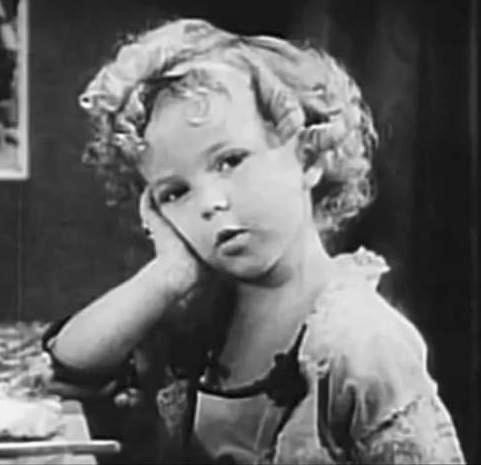
Shirley Temple

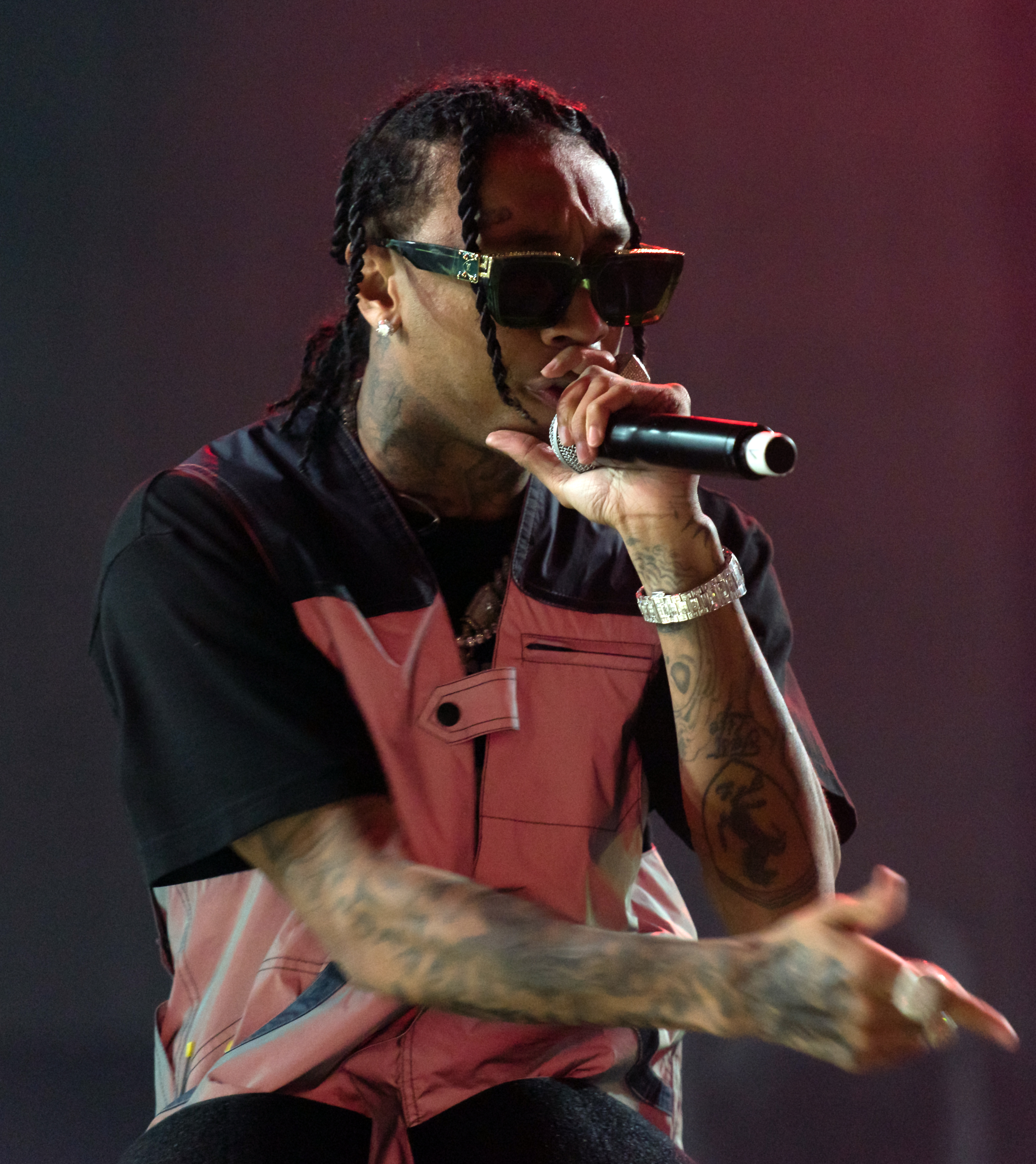
Tyga

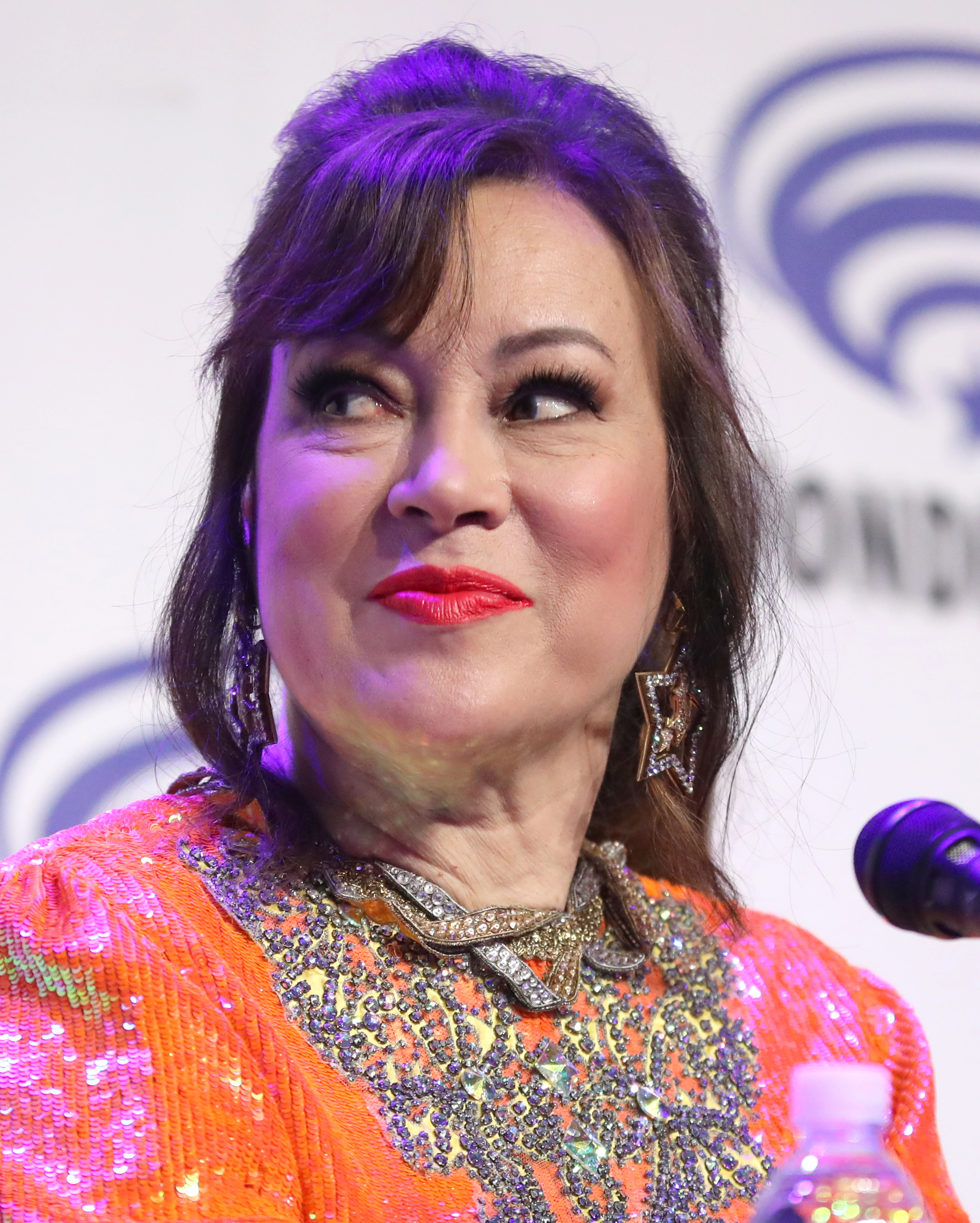
Jennifer Tilly

- Taboo (born 1975) – rapper
- Miiko Taka (1925–2023) – actress (originally from Seattle, Washington)
- George Takei (born 1937) – actor
- Thomas Lincoln Tally (1861 – 1945) – motion picture theater proprietor and film producer (born in Texas)
- Amber Tamblyn (born 1983) – actress (born in Santa Monica, California)
- Russ Tamblyn (born 1934) – actor, dancer
- Frank Tashlin (1913–1972) – animator and film director
- Buck Taylor (born 1938) – actor
- Deshon Taylor (born 1996) – basketball player for Hapoel Haifa of the Israeli Basketball Premier League
- Elizabeth Taylor (1932–2011) – actress (UK-born but grew up in Los Angeles; originally from Hampstead, London, England)
- Michele Martin Taylor – painter
- R. Ervin Taylor (1938–2019) – anthropologist
- Shirley Temple (1928–2014) – actress (born in Santa Monica)
- Mike Tenay (born 1955) – professional wrestling announcer for WCW and TNA (later Impact Wrestling)
- Tere Tereba – fashion designer, writer, actress (originally from Warren, Ohio)
- Reggie Theus (born 1957) – basketball player and coach (born in Inglewood)
- Robin Thicke (born 1977) – singer-songwriter
- John Floyd Thomas Jr. (born 1936) – serial killer
- Lavale Thomas (born 1963) – NFL player
- Bart Thompson (born 1978) – publisher
- Dijon Thompson (born 1983) – basketball player for Hapoel Jerusalem of the Israeli Basketball Premier League
- Klay Thompson (born 1990) – NBA player
- Lawrence Tibbett (1896–1960) – baritone opera singer and actor (born in Bakersfield)
- Kevin Tighe (born 1944) – actor
- Jennifer Tilly (born 1958) – actress
- Michael Tilson Thomas (born 1944) – conductor
- Tinashe (born 1993) – singer (born in Lexington, Kentucky)
- Tone Loc (born 1966) – musician
- Too Short (born 1966) − rapper
- Dara Torres (born 1967) – Olympic swimmer (born in Beverly Hills)
- Eloy Torrez (born 1954) – muralist (born in New Mexico)
- Tamara Toumanova (1919–1996) – actress, dancer (originally from Tyumen, Russia)
- Robert Towne (1934–2024) – screenwriter, director, producer
- Danny Trejo (born 1944) – actor
- Helle Trevino (born 1975) – IFBB professional bodybuilder (originally from Sønderborg, Denmark)
- Larry Tripplett (born 1979) – football player
- Mark Tuan (born 1993) – member of Got7, rapper
- Charlie Tuna (1944–2016) – radio personality, unofficial mayor of Tarzana (born in Nebraska)
- Ryan Turell (born 1999) – basketball player for the G-League Motor City Cruise, Yeshiva University
- Ruby Rose Turner (born 2005) – actress, singer, dancer
- Ty Dolla Sign (born 1982) – singer
- Tyler, the Creator (born 1991) – rapper, producer, director, member of OFWGKTA

== U ==
- Andrew Ullmann (born 1963) – politician
- Terdema Ussery (born 1958) – CEO of NBA's Dallas Mavericks

== V ==
- Ritchie Valens (1941–1959) – musician, composer
- Kathy Valentine (born 1959) – bassist, The Go-Go's (born in Austin)
- Grace Van Dien (born 1996) – actress
- Leslie Van Houten (born 1949) – Charles Manson acolyte (born in Altadena, California)
- Laura Vandervoort (born 1984) – actress, martial artist (born in Toronto, Canada)
- Cristina Vee (born 1987) – voice actress
- Trevor Veitch (born 1946) – musician, record producer (originally from Vancouver, Canada)
- Gwen Verdon (1925–2000) – actress, dancer (born in Culver City)
- Sofia Vergara (born 1972) – actress (originally from Barranquilla, Colombia)
- Victoria (born 1971) – professional wrestler (born in San Bernardino, California)
- Antonio Villaraigosa (born 1953) – former mayor of Los Angeles
- Brandon Vincent (born 1994) – soccer player
- Roy Marlin "Butch" Voris (1919–2005) – World War II flying ace and founder of the United States Navy Blue Angels

== W ==
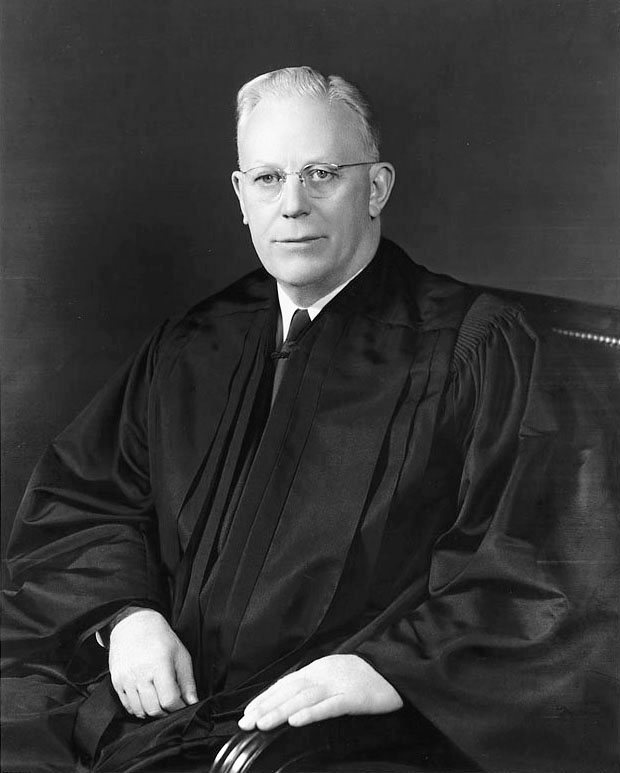
Earl Warren

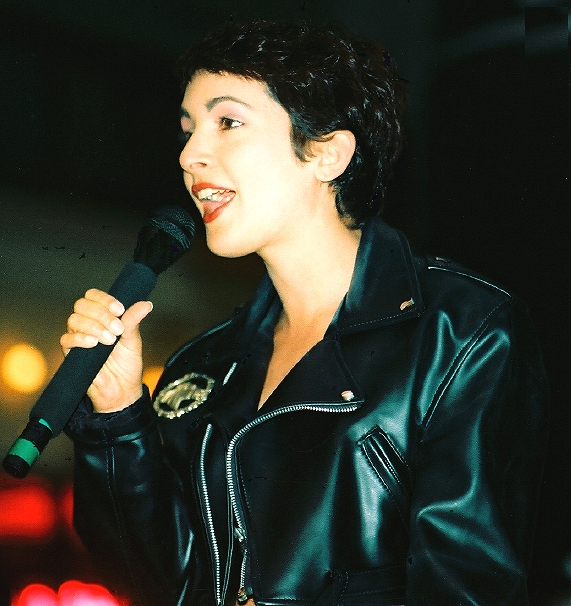
Jane Wiedlin

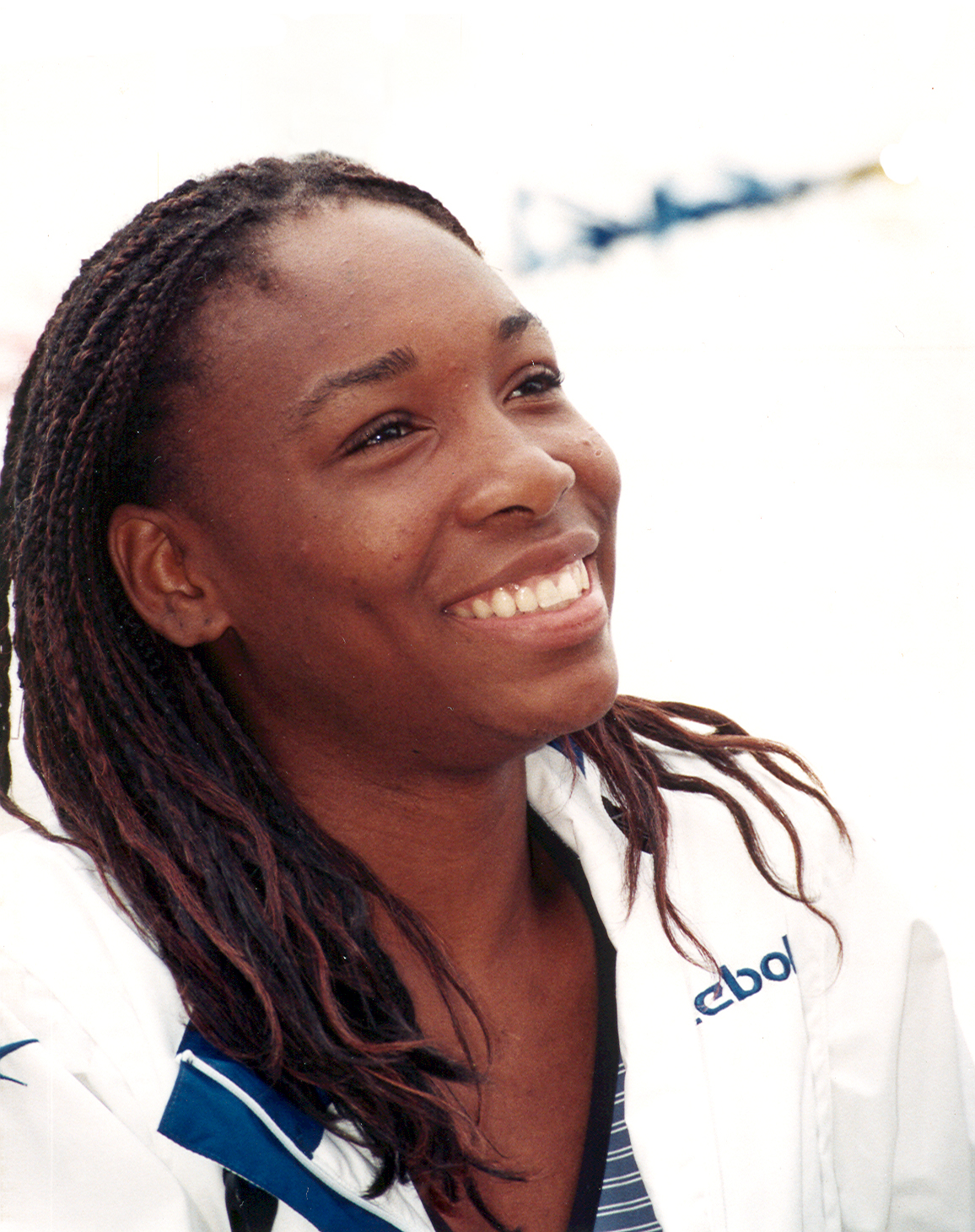
Venus Williams

- Brian Patrick Wade (born 1978) – actor
- Preston Wadley – multimedia artist
- Lindsay Wagner (born 1949) – actress
- Natasha Gregson Wagner (born 1970) – actress
- Robert Wagner (born 1930) – actor (born in Detroit)
- Duffy Waldorf (born 1962) – professional golfer
- Pat Walker (1939–1999) – activist, poet, and businesswoman
- Tyler Walker (born 1979) – NASCAR driver
- Dylan Walsh (born 1963) – actor
- Joseph Wambaugh (1937–2025) – police officer, novelist
- Burt Ward (born 1945) – actor
- Megan Ward (born 1969) – actress
- Rick Ware (born 1963) – NASCAR driver
- Frank Warner (1926–2011) – sound editor
- Earl Warren (1891–1974) – Governor of California, Chief Justice of the United States
- Casey Wasserman (born 1974) – sports and entertainment figure
- Maxine Waters (born 1938) – U.S. congresswoman, former state assemblywoman
- Tionne "T-Boz" Watkins (born 1970) – singer (originally from Des Moines, Iowa)
- Bob Watson (1946–2020) – Major League Baseball player and executive
- Henry Waxman (born 1939) – politician
- Gerard Way (born 1977) – musician (born in Summit, New Jersey)
- Patrick Wayne (born 1939) – actor
- Doodles Weaver (1911–1983) – comedian
- Jeff Weaver (born 1976) – baseball player (born in Northridge)
- Jered Weaver (born 1982) – baseball player (born in Northridge)
- Jack Webb (1920–1982) – actor, television producer (born in Santa Monica)
- Wilson Weddington (1847–1923) – postmaster, businessman, and landowner (born in the midwest)
- Michael Welch (born 1987) – actor
- Nathanael West (1903–1940) – author
- Chanel West Coast (born 1988) – rapper
- Russell Westbrook (born 1988) – basketball player for the Oklahoma City Thunder (born in Long Beach)
- Edward Weston (1886–1958) – photographer
- Charles H. Whipple (1849–1932) – US Army brigadier general
- Kitty White (1923–2009) – jazz singer
- Mae Whitman (born 1988) – actor
- Sidney Wicks (born 1949) – basketball player
- Jane Wiedlin (born 1958) – rhythm guitarist of the Go–Go's, actress (born in Oconomowoc, Wisconsin)
- William R. Wilkerson (1890–1962) – founder of Ciro's, The Hollywood Reporter, Flamingo Hotel (born in Tennessee)
- will.i.am – rapper, producer
- Anson Williams (born 1949) – actor
- Anthony A. Williams (born 1951) – mayor of Washington, D.C.
- Cindy Williams (1947–2023) – actress
- Colleen Williams (born 1955) – television newscaster (originally from Winston-Salem, North Carolina)
- Esther Williams (1921–2013) – actress, swimmer (born in Inglewood)
- Guy Williams (born 1960) – basketball player
- Sarah Anne Williams – voice actress (originally from Indiana)
- Serena Williams (born 1981) – tennis player (born in Michigan)
- Venus Williams (born 1980) – tennis player
- Chris Willingham (1950–2025) – film editor
- Larry Wilmore (born 1961) – television personality
- Brian Wilson (born 1942) – singer, composer (born in Inglewood)
- Vivian Wilson (born 2004) – social media influencer, model
- Rita Wilson (born 1956) – actress, producer (originally from Hollywood)
- Torrie Wilson (born 1975) – model, actress, professional wrestler (born in Boise, Idaho)
- Paul Winfield (1939–2004) – actor
- Ariel Winter (born 1998) – actress (born in Fairfax, Virginia)
- Bill Wistrom (1935–2010) – sound editor
- Zachary "Kid Yamaka" Wohlman (1988–2021) – professional boxer
- Wally Wolf (1930–1997) – swimmer, water polo player, and Olympic champion
- Matthew Wolff (born 1999) – professional golfer
- Nat Wolff (born 1994) – actor, singer, songwriter
- Anna May Wong (1905–1961) – actress
- Dr. Woo – tattoo artist
- John Wooden (1910–2010) – Hall of Fame basketball UCLA coach (born in Indiana)
- Indiana Woodward – ballet dancer (originally from Paris, France)
- Cal Worthington (1920–2013) – auto dealer (born in Oklahoma)
- James Worthy (born 1961) – Lakers basketball player and broadcaster (born in North Carolina)
- Clare Wren (born 1962) – actress (originally from New Orleans, Louisiana)
- Dorell Wright (born 1985) – NBA small forward for Golden State Warriors
- Haji Wright (born 1998) – soccer player
- Jason Wright (born 1982) – American football player and executive
- Noah Wyle (born 1971) – actor

== Y ==
- Zev Yaroslavsky (born 1948) – politician
- Dwight Yoakam (born 1956) – country music singer and songwriter (born in Pikeville, Kentucky)
- Sam Yorty (1909–1998) – 37th mayor of Los Angeles (1961–1973) (originally from Lincoln, Nebraska)
- Lee Thompson Young (1984–2013) – actor (originally from Columbia, South Carolina)
- Nick Young (born 1985) – basketball player
- Tony Young (1937–2002) – actor (originally from New York City)

== Z ==
- Louis Zamperini (1917–2014) – Olympian and war hero (born in Olean, New York, raised in Torrance)
- Richard D. Zanuck (1934–2012) – film producer
- Ahmet Zappa (born 1974) – musician
- Dweezil Zappa (born 1969) – musician
- Frank Zappa (1940–1993) – musician (born in Baltimore)
- Todd Zeile (born 1965) – baseball player (born in Van Nuys)
- Lance Zeno (born 1967) – NFL player
- Efrem Zimbalist Jr. (1918–2014) – actor (born in New York City)
- Stephanie Zimbalist (born 1956) – actress (born in New York City, raised in Los Angeles)
- Valerie Zimring (born 1965) – rhythmic gymnast

== See also ==
- List of Los Angeles rappers
- List of people from Los Feliz, Los Angeles
