= Deaths in March 2024 =

The following is a list of notable deaths in March 2024.

Entries for each day are listed alphabetically by surname. A typical entry lists information in the following sequence:

- Name, age, country of citizenship at birth, subsequent country of citizenship (if applicable), reason for notability, cause of death (if known), and reference.

== March 2024 ==
=== 1 ===
- Norman B. Anderson, 68, American scientist and academic, complications from knee surgery.
- Iris Apfel, 102, American businesswoman and designer.
- Chance Browne, 75, American cartoonist (Hi and Lois), pancreatic cancer.
- Ennio Calabria, 86, Italian painter and illustrator.
- Moisés Calleros, 34, Mexican boxer, cardiac arrest.
- Ch'ng Jit Koon, 90, Chinese-born Singaporean politician, MP (1968–1988, 1989–1991, 1992–1996).
- Jacqueline Duhême, 96, French illustrator and writer.
- Pauline Eisenstadt, 84, American politician, member of the New Mexico House of Representatives (1985–1993) and Senate (1997–2000).
- Eskendereya, 17, American Thoroughbred racehorse, heart failure.
- Lynn Fainchtein, 61, Spanish music producer and film composer.
- Erling Folkvord, 74, Norwegian politician, MP (1993–1997).
- Gerald Gustafson, 95, American fighter pilot.
- Ataullah Hamidi, 69, Turkish politician, mayor of Batman (1984–1994) and MP (1996–2002, 2015–2018), heart attack.
- David Ananda Hart, 69, British theologian and Anglican priest.
- Tom James, 94, American politician, member of the Texas House of Representatives (1959–1963).
- David Johnson, 97, American photographer.
- Eric Jones, 87, British-Australian economic historian (The European Miracle).
- Monique Journod, 88, French painter and lithographer.
- Farhan Khan, 23, Pakistani footballer (Pakistan Air Force), traffic collision.
- Charles Kurfess, 94, American politician, member of the Ohio House of Representatives (1957–1978).
- João Maia, 82, Brazilian philosopher and politician, deputy (1988–1997).
- Andrés Miranda Hernández, 89, Spanish politician, president of the Cabildo Insular de Tenerife (1971–1974) and member of the Cortes Españolas (1967–1974).
- Bjørn Pedersen, 90, Norwegian chemist.
- Péter Povázsay, 77, Hungarian Olympic canoeist (1972).
- Tristram Powell, 83, English director, producer and screenwriter, leukaemia.
- Aziz Qureshi, 82, Indian politician, MP (1984–1989), governor of Uttarakhand (2012–2015) and Uttar Pradesh (2014).
- Pit Schubert, 88, German non-fiction author and mountain climber.
- Sun Jun, 97, Chinese tunnel engineer.
- Jacques Tasso, 79, French rally racer.
- Akira Toriyama, 68, Japanese manga artist (Dragon Ball, Dr. Slump) and video game artist (Dragon Quest), subdural hematoma.
- Allan Watson, 81, Welsh-born American football player (Pittsburgh Steelers).
- Carroll B. Williams Jr., 94, American research forester and entomologist.
- Don Wise, 81, American tenor saxophonist.
- Vladimir Yedalov, 69, Russian politician, senator (2013–2015).

=== 2 ===
- Jim Beard, 63, American keyboardist (Steely Dan).
- Maurice Bembridge, 79, English golfer, cancer.
- Blues Boy Willie, 77, American blues musician, complications from a stroke.
- Nigel Brooks, 97, English composer, arranger and conductor.
- Monthian Buntan, 58, Thai politician, senator (2008–2014, since 2019), member of the National Legislative Assembly (2014–2019).
- Janice Burgess, 72, American television writer, producer and executive (The Backyardigans, Winx Club, Blue's Clues), breast cancer.
- Azam Cheema, 70, Pakistani Lashkar-e-Taiba operative, heart attack. (death announced on this date)
- W. C. Clark, 84, American blues musician.
- Mark Dodson, 64, American voice actor (Gremlins, Return of the Jedi, Day of the Dead), heart attack.
- Ángel Duarte Valverde, 89, Ecuadorian lawyer and politician, deputy (1986–1988), governor of Guayas Province (1992–1995).
- Vladimir Dyachenko, 75, Russian politician, governor of Amur Oblast (1994–1996), senator (1996).
- Tim Ecclestone, 76, Canadian ice hockey player (St. Louis Blues, Detroit Red Wings, Atlanta Flames).
- Mohammed Emami-Kashani, 92, Iranian politician, member of the Assembly of Experts (since 1983).
- Wally Firth, 89, Canadian politician, MP (1972–1979).
- Leonard Everett Fisher, 99, American children's books illustrator.
- Alain Gerolami, 97, French government official, prefect of Mayenne (1973–1977), prefect of Seine-Maritime (1982–1985).
- Mark F. Giuliano, 62, American law enforcement official, deputy director of the FBI (2013–2016).
- Dan Haerle, 86, American jazz musician and pianist.
- Martin Herbster, 62, German Olympic wrestler (1984).
- Howard Hiatt, 98, American medical researcher.
- Paul Houde, 69, Canadian actor (Les Boys, Winter Stories) and television and radio host, complications from brain surgery.
- Hwang Young-ha, 84, South Korean civil servant and politician, secretary general of the Board of Audit and Inspection (1993).
- Jaclyn Jose, 60, Filipino actress (The Flor Contemplacion Story, Familia Zaragoza, Ma' Rosa), heart attack.
- Kenji Manabe, 88, Japanese pathologist and politician, member of the House of Councillors (1977–1989, 1995–2007), director-general of the environmental agency (1998–1999).
- James Corson Niederman, 99, American epidemiologist.
- John Okafor, 62, Nigerian actor (Issakaba) and comedian.
- Ørjar Øyen, 97, Norwegian academic and sociologist, rector of the University of Bergen (1978–1983).
- Søren Pape Poulsen, 52, Danish politician, MP (since 2015) and minister of justice (2016–2019), cerebral haemorrhage.
- Richard Plotz, 75, American Tolkien scholar, cancer.
- Antoine Predock, 87, American architect.
- Leena Rauhala, 82, Finnish politician, MP (1999–2015).
- Dinu Săraru, 92, Romanian novelist.
- Odd Selmer, 94, Norwegian journalist, novelist, and playwright.
- Lawrence Solan, 71, American academic.
- Tizway, 19, American Thoroughbred racehorse, heart attack.
- Nikola Vuljanić, 74, Croatian politician, MEP (2013–2014).
- Eugene Wijeysingha, 89–90, Malaysian-born Singaporean educator and historian.
- Kazbek Zankishiev, 31, Russian judoka.

=== 3 ===
- Hanne Andersen, 84, Danish politician, MP (1984–2001).
- Alexandre Baptista, 83, Portuguese footballer (Sporting CP, national team).
- John Beasley, 84, British mathematician and chess composer.
- Edward Bond, 89, British dramatist (Saved, Narrow Road to the Deep North, The Sea) and theatre director.
- Zach Brewer, 44, American racecar driver.
- Betty Brodel, 104, American actress (Swing Hostess, Too Young to Know, Cinderella Jones).
- Brian Canty, 92, British diplomat, governor of Anguilla (1989–1992).
- Juli Lynne Charlot, 101, American actress and fashion designer.
- Eleanor Collins, 104, Canadian jazz singer, television host and civic leader.
- Peter Conrad, 78, American sociologist, pneumonia.
- Carlos Díaz Medina, 88, Spanish politician, member of the Andalusian parliament (1982–1994), mayor of Cádiz (1979–1995).
- Ruxandra Dumitrescu, 46, Romanian-born Greek volleyball player (Panathinaikos, Romania national team, Greece national team), heart attack.
- Kenneth B. Eisenthal, 90, American physical chemist.
- Emmanuëlle, 81, Canadian singer.
- Roberto Fleitas, 91, Uruguayan football player and manager (Peñarol, Liverpool, national team).
- John Gau, 83, British television producer.
- Oscar Ghiglia, 85, Italian classical guitarist.
- Bob Harrison, 96, American basketball player (Minneapolis Lakers, Milwaukee Hawks / St. Louis Hawks, Syracuse Nationals).
- Brian Honeywood, 74, English footballer (Colchester United, Chelmsford City).
- Agbéyomé Kodjo, 69, Togolese politician, prime minister (2000–2002) and president of the National Assembly (1999–2000), heart attack.
- Tetsuzan Kuroda, 73, Japanese swordfighter.
- Günther Leib, 96, German operatic baritone.
- Carl Madison, 93, American high school football coach (J. M. Tate High School, Pine Forest High School).
- Dan McCartan, 84, Northern Irish Gaelic footballer (Down), selector and manager.
- Mitch Molloy, 58, Canadian ice hockey player (Buffalo Sabres).
- Chris Mortensen, 72, American sports journalist (ESPN, Atlanta Journal-Constitution), throat cancer.
- Walter Mössinger, 75, German Olympic artistic gymnast (1972).
- Nakajima Natsu, 80, Japanese dancer.
- V. B. C. Onyema III, 97, Nigerian traditional ruler of Ogwu-Ikpele (since 1976). (death announced on this date)
- Ed Ott, 72, American baseball player (Pittsburgh Pirates, California Angels), World Series champion (1979).
- Morris Overstreet, 73, American jurist, judge on the Texas Court of Criminal Appeals (1991–1999), prostate cancer.
- Amjad Parvez, 78, Pakistani singer and writer.
- Suzy Platiel, 93, Algerian-born French ethnolinguist and Africanist.
- Presto, 31, German rapper, cancer.
- Bill Ramsay, 95, American jazz saxophonist and bandleader.
- Léon-Pierre Raybaud, 89, French legal historian and politician, mayor of Levens (1991–1994).
- Arnold L. Rheingold, 83, American chemist.
- Klaus Röhl, 90, German radiochemist and politician, MP (1990–1998).
- Félix Sabal Lecco, 64–65, Cameroonian drummer.
- Mounir Sabet, 87, Egyptian general and sports official, president of the Egyptian Olympic Committee (1990–1993).
- Makoto Shinohara, 92, Japanese composer, stomach cancer.
- Ian Strachan, 83, Scottish-born Canadian politician, Newfoundland and Labrador MHA (1975–1979).
- Claudio Tognolli, 60, Brazilian investigative journalist (Veja, Folha de S.Paulo, Jornal da Tarde), complications from heart transplant.
- Paolino Tomaino, 86, Italian Roman Catholic priest and missionary.
- Jim Trujillo, 84, American politician, member of the New Mexico House of Representatives (2003–2020), kidney failure.
- Atie Voorbij, 83, Dutch Olympic swimmer (1960).
- U. L. Washington, 70, American baseball player (Kansas City Royals, Montreal Expos, Pittsburgh Pirates), cancer.

=== 4 ===
- Michael Adie, 94, English Anglican clergyman, bishop of Guildford (1983–1994), pneumonia.
- Jimmy Anderson, 86, American college basketball coach (Oregon State Beavers).
- Oluremi Atanda, 84, Nigerian agricultural scientist.
- Barbara Balzerani, 75, Italian communist militant (Red Brigades) and convicted terrorist.
- Jean-Pierre Bourtayre, 82, French composer (The Game Is Over, Arsène Lupin, Les Maîtres du temps).
- Char-ron Dorsey, 46, American football player (Dallas Cowboys, Houston Texans), complications from a stroke.
- Francisco Javier Errázuriz Talavera, 81, Chilean politician, senator (1994–2002), complications from a stroke.
- Francisco González Valer, 84, Spanish Roman Catholic prelate, auxiliary bishop of Washington (2002–2014).
- Tony Green, 85, British sports commentator and television announcer (Bullseye), complications from Alzheimer's disease.
- Max Hardy, 40, American chef and restaurateur.
- James Hedges, 85, American politician.
- Michael Jenkins, 77, Australian writer, producer and film and television director (The Heartbreak Kid).
- Peep Jöffert, 79, Estonian racing cyclist.
- Lewis Jones, 92, Welsh rugby union (national team) and rugby league player (Leeds, Wentworthville).
- Yazan al-Kafarneh, 10, Palestinian boy, malnourishment.
- Ronnie King, 76, Dutch-born Canadian musician (The Stampeders).
- Piotr Krupa, 87, Polish Roman Catholic prelate, auxiliary bishop of Koszalin-Kołobrzeg (1984–1992) and Pelplin (1992–2011).
- José León Asensio, 90, Dominican tobacco and beverage industry executive, chairman of Cervecería Nacional Dominicana (1986–1993) and president of Grupo León Jimenes (since 1993).
- Paryse Martin, 64, American-born Canadian artist, heart disease.
- Ramón Masats, 92, Spanish photographer.
- Kees Rijvers, 97, Dutch football player (AS Saint-Etiénne, national team) and manager (PSV Eindhoven).
- B. B. Seaton, 79, Jamaican singer (The Gaylads), songwriter and record producer.
- Joe Shannon, 59, Irish chef and television presenter (Ireland AM), cancer.
- Rafael Suissa, 89, Israeli politician, member of the Knesset (1981–1984).
- Tarako, 63, Japanese voice actress (Inuyasha, Chibi Maruko-Chan, Castle in the Sky).
- Juan Verduzco, 78, Mexican actor (La familia P. Luche, Destilando Amor, The Stray Cat).
- Amnon Weinstein, 84, Israeli luthier.

=== 5 ===
- Linda Balgord, 64, American actress and singer (The Pirate Queen, Cats, The Phantom of the Opera).
- John Behrent, 85, New Zealand cricketer (Auckland, Wellington).
- Elizabeth Bernays, 83–84, Australian entomologist.
- Vladimir Beryozov, 83, Russian military officer and politician, senator (2002).
- Debra Byrd, 72, American singer and vocal coach.
- Patricia M. Collins, 96, American civic leader and politician, mayor of Caribou, Maine (1981–1982).
- Nesse Godin, 95, Lithuanian-born American Holocaust survivor.
- Kathy Goldman, 92, American anti-poverty activist.
- Guy Griffiths, 101, Australian rear admiral.
- Éric Guimbeau, 63, Mauritian businessman and politician, MP (2000–2014), motorcycle accident.
- Thomas C. Hanks, 79, American seismologist, stroke.
- Vadym Hladun, 86, Ukrainian basketball player (Budivelnyk, Soviet Union national team) and coach.
- Sonia Hoey, 44, Irish association (Peamount United) and Gaelic (Louth) footballer, cervical cancer.
- N. K. Jose, 95, Indian historian.
- Haïm Kern, 93, German-born French sculptor, painter, and engraver.
- Wiesław Kondracki, 85, Polish engineer, economist, and politician, MP (1989–1991).
- Rolf Larcher, 89, Swiss rower, Olympic bronze medalist (1960).
- Roberto Leoni, 83, Italian screenwriter (Santa Sangre, My Dear Killer, Street People) and film director.
- Dagmar Loe, 101, Norwegian journalist (Dagsrevyen).
- Steve Marsh, 99, Australian football player (South Fremantle, Western Australia) and coach (East Fremantle).
- Ken J. Miller, 61, American politician, member of the North Carolina House of Representatives (1995–1997).
- Siphiwe Mkhonza, 45, South African footballer (Lamontville Golden Arrows, Kaizer Chiefs, national team), kidney infection.
- Sidsel Mørck, 86, Norwegian writer.
- Marcello Norberth, 87, Italian photographer.
- Jack Parrington, 90, Canadian Olympic sprinter (1956).
- Morton Povman, 93, American politician, member of the New York City Council (1971–2001), pancreatic cancer.
- Nadezhda Shaydenko, 71, Russian academic and politician, MP (2011–2016).
- Collin Small, 44, American man, shot
- Solihin G. P., 97, Indonesian military officer, governor of West Java (1970–1975), lung and kidney disease.
- Kari Juhani Sorri, 82, Finnish chess player.
- Richard Stone, 86, British anti-racism activist and medical doctor.
- Misha Suslov, 84, Russian cinematographer (The Sixth of July, The Seagull, Black Moon Rising).
- Giuseppina Torello, 80, Italian middle-distance and cross-country runner.
- António-Pedro Vasconcelos, 84, Portuguese film director (Dead Man's Seat, Jaime, Beauty and the Paparazzo).
- Pavel Zajíček, 72, Czech poet, musician (DG 307) and visual artist, pneumonia.

=== 6 ===
- Faqir Chand Aggarwal, 91, Indian educator and politician, Haryana MLA (1996–2000), cardiac arrest.
- Seppo Ahokainen, 72, Finnish ice hockey player (Ilves, EC KAC, Tappara).
- Alfredo Baranda García, 79, Mexican lawyer, diplomat and politician, governor of the State of Mexico (1986–1987) and federal consumer attorney (1990–1994).
- Cecilia Eckelmann Battistello, 73, Italian-born British container industry executive, chairman of Contship Italia Group (since 1996).
- Jim Browner, 68, American football player (Cincinnati Bengals).
- Jose Concepcion Jr., 92, Filipino businessman, activist, and politician, president of RFM Corporation (1965–1986), delegate to the 1971 constitutional convention, and secretary of trade and industry (1986–1991).
- Domício Coutinho, 92, Brazilian-born American author.
- Austen Robin Crapp, 90, Australian Roman Catholic prelate, bishop of Aitape (1999–2009).
- Roger Davis, 85, American football player (Chicago Bears, New York Giants, Los Angeles Rams).
- Hreinn Friðfinnsson, 81, Icelandic artist.
- Françoise Garner, 90, French soprano.
- Ted Gray, 96, American politician, member of the Ohio Senate (1951–1994).
- Ray Grenald, 96, American architectural lighting designer, congestive heart failure.
- Barbara Joans, 89, American anthropologist, cardiopulmonary failure.
- Santosh Madhavan, 63, Indian religious leader and convicted sex offender, heart disease.
- Dick Monteith, 92, American politician, member of the California State Senate (1994–2002).
- Dimos Moutsis, 85, Greek singer-songwriter and composer.
- Martin Ndongo-Ebanga, 57, Cameroonian boxer, Olympic bronze medallist (1984).
- Brian Nestande, 60, American politician, member of the California State Assembly (2008–2014).
- Larry H. Parker, 75, American personal injury lawyer.
- Pigcasso, 7, South African painting pig, rheumatoid arthritis. (death announced on this date)
- Nizam Rawther, 49, Indian scriptwriter (Zachariayude Garbhinikal, Bombay Mittayi, Radio) and documentary filmmaker.
- Vikki Richards, 79, Trinidadian-born English actress (Black Snake, Percy's Progress, Crown Court).
- Dietrich Rusche, 87, German lawyer and politician, member of the Hamburg Parliament (2001–2008).
- Mohammed Al-Sharekh, 82, Kuwaiti businessman and author.
- Nick Sheridan, 32, Irish journalist and television presenter (News2day, Reporting Scotland, The Nine), brain aneurysm.
- Mitsuko Tabe, 91, Japanese artist.
- Rimas Tuminas, 72, Lithuanian theatre director.
- Claudio Velluti, 84, Italian basketball player (Olimpia Cagliari, Olimpia Milano, national team).
- Margrit Weber-Röllin, 86, Swiss politician, member of the Cantonal Council of Schwyz (1980–1988).

=== 7 ===
- Biraj Adhikari, 63, Indian politician, founder of the Sikkim National People's Party.
- Pedro Altamiranda, 88, Panamanian singer.
- Lynne Barasch, 84, American illustrator and author.
- Jean-Baptiste Bordas, 86, French Olympic footballer (1960).
- Jean-Paul Colonval, 84, Belgian football player (Tilleur, Standard Liège) and manager (Racing Jet de Bruxelles).
- Joe Cutajar, 83, Maltese singer (Helen and Joseph). (death announced on this date)
- Connie Eaves, 79, Canadian biologist.
- Darío Espínola, 56, Paraguayan footballer (Everton, national team).
- David Granger, 69, Australian footballer (Port Adelaide, St Kilda).
- Patsy Healey, 84, British urban planner.
- Robert Heisner, 77, Martial arts expert and Christian minister.
- Roger T. Hughes, 82, Canadian jurist, justice of the Federal Court (2005–2016).
- John Isenbarger, 76, American football player (San Francisco 49ers).
- Ahmet Koç, 46, Turkish-born Belgian politician.
- John Kumah, 45, Ghanaian politician, MP (since 2021).
- Steve Lawrence, 88, American singer ("Go Away Little Girl", "Footsteps") and actor (The Blues Brothers), complications from Alzheimer's disease.
- Daniel Martin, 72, French actor (Le Dîner de Cons, East/West, Most Promising Young Actress).
- Wayne Moses, 69, American football coach (UCLA Bruins, Pittsburgh Panthers, St. Louis Rams).
- Armistead Neely, 76, American tennis player.
- Minervino Pietra, 70, Portuguese football player (Benfica, national team) and manager (Estoril).
- Heinz A. Richter, 84, German historian and author.
- Jim Roddey, 91, American politician, Allegheny County chief executive (2000–2004).
- Richard Rosecrance, 93, American political scientist.
- Stéphane Rosse, 61, French cartoonist.
- Lucas Samaras, 87, Greek-born American photographer, sculptor and painter.
- Dennis L. Serrette, 83, American civil and labor rights activist.
- Son Myung-soon, 95, South Korean first lady (1993–1998).
- Nili Tal, 80, Israeli journalist (Haaretz) and filmmaker (Women for Sale).
- Margaret Tynes, 104, American opera singer.

=== 8 ===
- Milan Arnejčič, 81, Slovene footballer (Železničar Maribor, Maribor, Red Star Belgrade).
- Elizabeth Balgobin, 58, British charity administrator, cancer.
- Koço Barka, 69, Albanian politician, MP (since 2011).
- José María Benavides, 79, Spanish Olympic sailor (1976, 1980).
- Brother Dege, 56, American musician.
- Guy Boutilier, 65, Canadian politician, Alberta MLA (1997–2012) and mayor of Wood Buffalo (1995–1997) and Fort McMurray (1992–1996).
- Ron Busniuk, 75, Canadian ice hockey player (Buffalo Sabres, Minnesota Fighting Saints, New England Whalers).
- Henry Chakava, 77, Kenyan publisher.
- Abdou Cherif, 52, Moroccan singer, heart attack.
- Diana Conti, 67, Argentine lawyer and politician, twice deputy, senator (2002–2005) and member of the Council of Magistracy of the Nation (2006–2010).
- Duncan Fearnley, 83, English cricketer (Worcestershire) and sporting goods manufacturer.
- Ernie Fields Jr., 89, American baritone saxophonist and session musician.
- Egon Fleischmann, 89, German Olympic cross-country skier (1960).
- Michael Goodfellow, 83, British academic.
- David E. Harris, 89, American pilot.
- Jonathan Hunt, 85, New Zealand politician and diplomat, Postmaster-General (1984–1987), member (1966–2005) and speaker (1999–2005) of the House of Representatives.
- Greg Hyatt, 70, American political activist and attorney.
- Kali Kalo, 97, Greek actress.
- Herbert Kroemer, 95, German-American physicist, Nobel laureate (2000).
- Tommy McAvoy, Baron McAvoy, 80, British politician, MP (1987–2010) and member of the House of Lords (since 2010).
- Kermit Moyer, 80, American author.
- George Newson, 91, English composer and pianist.
- Angelo Nicotra, 75, Italian actor (La casa stregata, The Arrival of Wang) and voice actor.
- Alexander Orlov, 85, Russian historian and author.
- Raymond Procter, 85, New Zealand cricketer (Otago).
- Dolly Sohi, 48, Indian actress (Kalash, Devon Ke Dev...Mahadev, Ek Tha Raja Ek Thi Rani), cervical cancer.
- Ľubomír Stankovský, 72, Slovak pop rock musician (Modus).
- Howard Stein, 95, American philosopher of science.
- Robert F. Trimble, 99, American major general.
- Raymond Uno, 93, American judge and civil rights activist.
- Ramya Wanigasekara, 73, Sri Lankan actress (Tikiri Suwanda, Ko Mark No Mark, Sarigama), singer, and radio broadcaster.
- William Whitworth, 87, American journalist (New York Herald Tribune, The New Yorker, The Atlantic) and author.
- Zhu Nenghong, 84, Chinese astronomical optical telescope specialist.
- Rolf Zick, 102, German journalist.

=== 9 ===
- Antanas Bagdonavičius, 85, Lithuanian rower, Olympic silver medallist (1960).
- John Barnett, 62, American aerospace engineer and whistleblower (Boeing).
- Hamid Behbahani, 83, Iranian engineer and politician, minister of roads and transportation (2008–2011).
- Julie Robinson Belafonte, 95, American actress and costume designer.
- Joe Bodovitz, 93, American journalist and conservationist.
- Tony Braswell, 79, American politician, mayor of Pine Level, North Carolina (1999–2003).
- Mayte Carol, 82, Mexican actress (Ruletero a toda marcha, El patrullero 777, La boda de mi mejor amigo).
- A. K. Dewdney, 82, Canadian mathematician, computer scientist (The Planiverse) and conspiracy theorist.
- Gerhard Dietrich, 81, German gymnast, Olympic bronze medallist (1968).
- Nikolay Durakov, 89, Russian bandy player (SKA-Sverdlovsk).
- Karl Galinsky, 82, American academic and historic researcher.
- Barbara Hillyer, 90, American academic and feminist.
- Malcolm Holcombe, 68, American singer-songwriter, respiratory failure.
- Jimmy Husband, 76, English footballer (Everton, Luton Town, Memphis Rogues).
- Mukhamet Kharrasov, 75, Russian physicist.
- Phosum Khimhun, 64, Indian politician, Arunachal Pradesh MLA (since 2014), heart attack.
- Lynn Kinnear, 64, British landscape architect, cancer.
- Claire Konold, 86, American politician, member of the South Dakota House of Representatives (1997–2004).
- Lance Nichols, 84, American baseball player (Los Angeles Dodgers) and coach (New Orleans Pelicans, Rochester Red Wings).
- Besar Nimani, 38, Kosovar-born German boxer, shot.
- José Oubrerie, 91, French architect, author and educator.
- Georgi Popov, 79, Bulgarian footballer (Botev Plovdiv, national team).
- Vince Power, 76, Irish music festival promoter.
- Diamela Puentes, 43, Cuban Olympic softball player (2000).
- Dave Ritchie, 85, American football coach (Montreal Alouettes, Winnipeg Blue Bombers, Zurich Renegades).
- Raili Riuttala, 90, Finnish Olympic swimmer (1952).
- Margaret Ann Stamey, 92, American politician, member of the North Carolina House of Representatives (1983–1993).
- Bernard Stoeser, 93, American politician, member of the South Dakota House of Representatives (1973–1974).
- Pedro Juan Texidor, 72, Puerto Rican actor, respiratory failure.
- Guy Touvron, 74, French trumpeter, heart attack.

=== 10 ===
- Percy Adlon, 88, German film director, screenwriter, and producer (Bagdad Cafe, Rosalie Goes Shopping, Younger and Younger).
- Alta, 81, American poet.
- Khalid Batarfi, 43–46, Saudi militant, emir of Al-Qaeda in the Arabian Peninsula (since 2020). (death announced on this date)
- Hanspeter Bellingrodt, 80, Colombian Olympic shooter (1972, 1976).
- Doug Blevins, 60, American college football coach.
- John Bond, 92, New Zealand rugby league player (national team).
- Sam Bugri, 80, Ghanaian Olympic sprinter (1968, 1972).
- Eric Carmen, 74, American musician (Raspberries), singer ("Hungry Eyes"), and songwriter ("All by Myself").
- Ernie Clark, 86, American football player (Detroit Lions, St. Louis Cardinals).
- Roger Noel Cook, 77, British comics writer, musician, and magazine editor.
- Sergey Diomidov, 80, Uzbek gymnast, Olympic silver medallist (1964, 1968).
- Carter Edwards, 82, Australian entertainer and radio presenter.
- Michel Ferlus, 88, French linguist and phonologist.
- Jerry Foley, 68, American television director (Late Show with David Letterman), skiing accident.
- Mutsumi Inomata, 63, Japanese animator (Space Warrior Baldios, Leda: The Fantastic Adventure of Yohko, City Hunter).
- Marwan Issa, 58, Palestinian militant, co-leader of the Izz ad-Din al-Qassam Brigades, airstrike.
- Footer Johnson, 92, American baseball player (Chicago Cubs).
- Ihsanul Karim, 73, Bangladeshi journalist (Bangladesh Sangbad Sangstha).
- Margot Lemire, 77, Canadian writer, poet, and playwright.
- Georgy Luntovsky, 73, Russian banker and politician, deputy (1996–1999), deputy chairman of the Central Bank of Russia (1999–2017).
- Steve Maxwell, 59, Australian footballer (Adelaide City, Marconi Stallions, national team).
- Svetlana Morgunova, 84, Russian television and radio host.
- Gigio Morra, 78, Italian actor (Ciao, Professore!, Gomorrah, Pinocchio).
- Myōbudani Kiyoshi, 86, Japanese sumo wrestler.
- Paul Nelson, American guitarist, record producer and songwriter, heart attack.
- Giandomenico Picco, 75, Italian diplomat.
- Yves Pillet, 84, French teacher and politician, deputy (1988–1993).
- Charles Kistner Pringle, 92, American politician, member of the Mississippi House of Representatives (1965–1968).
- Ruby Lynn Reyner, 76, American singer (Ruby and the Rednecks) and actress (Four Stars, Generation Um...).
- Abubakar Sodangi, 70, Nigerian politician, senator (1999–2011).
- T. M. Stevens, 72, American bass guitarist (The Pretenders), complications from dementia.
- Marc Tobaly, 74, Moroccan-born French guitarist and composer (Les Variations).
- Karl Wallinger, 66, Welsh musician (The Waterboys, World Party) and songwriter ("Ship of Fools").
- John Wennberg, 89, American healthcare researcher.
- Wayne Wilson, 66, American football player (New Orleans Saints, Minnesota Vikings, Washington Redskins).
- Yutaka Yoshie, 50, Japanese professional wrestler (NJPW), arteriosclerosis.
- Yehuda Zisapel, 81, Israeli businessman and philanthropist.

=== 11 ===
- Paul Alexander, 78, American lawyer and paralytic polio survivor, complications from COVID-19.
- Mohammed Barakat, 39, Palestinian footballer (national team), airstrike.
- Robert L. Barry, 89, American diplomat, ambassador to Bulgaria (1981–1984) and Indonesia (1992–1995), complications from dementia.
- Charlie Bird, 74, Irish journalist (RTÉ News) and broadcaster, complications from amyotrophic lateral sclerosis.
- Boss, 54, American rapper ("Deeper"), kidney failure.
- Madeleine Chapsal, 98, French writer.
- Chien Tung-ming, 72, Taiwanese politician, MP (2008–2020).
- John O. Colvin, 77, American lawyer, judge of the U.S. Tax Court (1988–2004).
- Emilio Correa, 70, Cuban welterweight boxer, Olympic champion (1972).
- Paul Denis, 81, Haitian politician, minister of justice and public security (2009–2011).
- Mulalo Doyoyo, 53, South African inventor.
- Hu Gabrielse, 98, Canadian geologist.
- Hannelore Gadatsch, 82, German television journalist and presenter.
- Marian Gołębiewski, 86, Polish Roman Catholic prelate, bishop of Koszalin–Kołobrzeg (1996–2004) and archbishop of Wrocław (2004–2013).
- Dick Jones, 82, American politician, member of the Kansas House of Representatives (2015–2017).
- Surya Kiran, 49, Indian film actor and director (Satyam, Dhana 51, Brahmastram), jaundice.
- Dorie Ladner, 81, American civil rights activist.
- Horace Lanfranchi, 88, French teacher and politician, president of the general council of Var (2002–2015).
- Lisa Larson, 92, Swedish ceramicist and designer.
- Mike McColl-Jones, 86, Australian television writer.
- Malachy McCourt, 92, American actor (Ryan's Hope, Search for Tomorrow, Gods and Generals) and politician.
- David Mixner, 77, American political activist and author, complications from COVID-19.
- Barbara Payne, 91, American baseball player (Kalamazoo Lassies, Battle Creek Belles, Rockford Peaches).
- Tamar Pelleg-Sryck, 97, Israeli human rights activist.
- Jessica Pettway, 36, American social media influencer, cervical cancer.
- Fred Piper, 83–84, British cryptographer, progressive supranuclear palsy.
- Pete Rodriguez, 89, American pianist ("I Like It Like That") and bandleader.
- Paola Roldán, 42, Ecuadorian businesswoman, pro-euthanasia activist and philanthropist, complications from amyothropic lateral sclerosis.
- Auke Tellegen, 93–94, Dutch-born American psychologist.
- Miriam Weledji, 86, Cameroonian lawyer.
- Vadim Yankov, 89, Russian mathematician and political prisoner.

=== 12 ===
- Robyn Bernard, 64, American actress (General Hospital).
- Ernesto Dela Peña, 91, Filipino composer and lyricist.
- Robert M. Elton, 91, American lieutenant general.
- Terry Everett, 87, American politician, member of the U.S. House of Representatives (1993–2009).
- Gottfried Feurstein, 85, Austrian economist and politician, MP (1975–2002).
- Sergio Giral, 87, Cuban-American film writer and director (The Other Francisco).
- Peter Glover, 78, English rugby union player (Bath, Harrogate, national team).
- Pauge Harmon, 78, Irish Gaelic footballer (Castledermot, Kildare).
- Nicholas Kiefer, 73, American economist.
- Michael Knott, 61, American singer-songwriter (Lifesavers Underground).
- John Lomax, 72, American journalist (WKRC), pneumonia.
- Yong Soon Min, 70, South Korean-born American artist.
- Shani Mott, 47, American scholar, adrenal cancer.
- Einar Ólafsson, 96, Icelandic basketball player and coach (ÍR).
- Arne Olsson, 93, Swedish Lutheran bishop.
- John Pease, 88, American sociologist.
- Bill Plummer, 76, American baseball player (Cincinnati Reds) and coach (Seattle Mariners, Colorado Rockies), World Series champion (1975, 1976), complications from a heart attack.
- Gani Qaliev, 85, Kazakh economist and politician, member of the Mäjilis (1999–2004).
- Maria Richwine, 71, Colombian-born American model and actress (The Buddy Holly Story, a.k.a. Pablo, Freddy's Nightmares).
- Kim Rudd, 66, Canadian politician, MP (2015–2019), ovarian cancer.
- Bernard L. Schwartz, 98, American businessman, CEO of Loral Space & Communications (1972–2006).
- Sean Tallaire, 50, Canadian ice hockey player (Manitoba Moose, ERC Ingolstadt, Kassel Huskies).
- James Whitbourn, 60, British composer and conductor, cancer.
- Wendy Witter, 88, British public servant.

=== 13 ===
- Stefan Abadzhiev, 89, Bulgarian footballer (Levski Sofia, Wiesbaden, national team).
- Don Allen, 84, American football player (Denver Broncos).
- Dick Allix, 78, British drummer (Vanity Fare) and darts official.
- Rosemary Aubert, 77, American-born Canadian author and poet.
- Pol de Beer, 89, Dutch politician, MP (1969–1989) and senator (1995–2003).
- Rolf Blättler, 81, Swiss football player (Grasshoppers, St. Gallen, national team) and manager.
- Margaret Curphey, 86, British soprano
- Jacques Donnay, 99, French politician, MEP (1994–1999), senator (1999–2001).
- Tommy Duncan, 87, Scottish football player (Airdrieonians, Falkirk) and manager (Queen's Park). (death announced on this date)
- Marcello Gandini, 85, Italian car designer (Lamborghini Miura, Lamborghini Countach, Lamborghini Diablo).
- György Gát, 77, Hungarian television director and producer (Linda, A Fox's Tale).
- Philippe de Gaulle, 102, French admiral and politician, senator (1986–2004).
- Notker Hammerstein, 93, German historian.
- Helga Haugen, 91, Norwegian politician, MP (1985–1993).
- Alvin Haymond, 81, American football player (Baltimore Colts, Los Angeles Rams, Washington Redskins).
- Bill Jorgensen, 96, American news anchor (WNEW-TV, WPIX-TV).
- Natalia Kasatkina, 89, Russian ballerina (The Rite of Spring) and choreographer (Swan Lake), blood clot.
- Julius Kohanyi, 91, Canadian film director (Summer's Children) and television producer (Sprockets).
- Gerald M. Levin, 84, American mass-media businessman (WarnerMedia), complications from Parkinson's disease.
- Sylvain Luc, 58, French jazz guitarist.
- Ira Millstein, 97, American antitrust lawyer.
- Sadi Mohammad, 66, Bangladeshi singer and composer, suicide by hanging.
- Claude Mourthé, 92, French writer and film director.
- Neophyte, 78, Bulgarian Orthodox prelate, patriarch of All Bulgaria (since 2013).
- Aribert Reimann, 88, German composer (Lear, Medea), pianist and accompanist.
- Kurt Rosenkranz, 96, Austrian adult educator.
- Edgardo Salvame, 61, Filipino politician, member of the House of Representatives (2022–2024).
- Hamdi al-Sayyid, 93, Egyptian cardiac surgeon and politician, MP.
- Matthias Schießleder, 87, German Olympic judoka (1964).
- Steve Smith, 77, English football player (Huddersfield Town, Halifax Town) and manager, dementia.
- Gerry Summers, 90, English football player (West Bromwich Albion, Sheffield United, Hull City), coach and manager.
- Dan Wakefield, 91, American novelist, journalist and screenwriter (Going All the Way).
- Edwin Wilson, 101, American academic administrator and professor of English literature (Wake Forest University).
- Julia Wong Kcomt, 59, Peruvian writer and poet, cancer.

=== 14 ===
- Socorro Acosta, 89, Filipino politician.
- Stephen Adams, 86, American businessman.
- Micheline Attoun, 87, French stage director.
- Lekan Balogun, 81, Nigerian politician and monarch, senator (1999–2003) and Olubadan (since 2022).
- Rashid Bawa, 83, Ghanaian diplomat and politician, MP (2001–2005).
- Walter Blum, 89, American Hall of Fame jockey, winner of the Belmont Stakes (1971), lung cancer.
- David Breashears, 68, American mountaineer and filmmaker (Everest).
- Francis Carroll, 93, Australian Roman Catholic prelate, archbishop of Canberra and Goulburn (1983–2006) and bishop of Wagga Wagga (1968–1983), president of the ACBC (2000–2006).
- Lamara Chkonia, 93, Georgian operatic soprano.
- Frank Darcel, 65, French guitarist (Marquis de Sade).
- Dahlman Davis, 83, American politician, member of the Missouri House of Representatives (1997–2005).
- Madeleine Herman de Blic, 89, Belgian-born Indian social worker.
- Fred Faour, 59, American author and radio personality (KFNC).
- Joan Gibbs, 70, American lawyer and activist, co-founder of Azalea: A Magazine by Third World Lesbians.
- Tom Gilmore Jr., 77, Australian politician, Queensland MLA (1986–1998).
- Ted Immers, 82, Dutch football player (Telstar) and manager (Eindhoven, Haarlem).
- Byron Janis, 95, American classical pianist.
- Mal Lucas, 85, Welsh footballer (Norwich City, Leyton Orient, Wales national team).
- Mike Lude, 101, American football coach (Colorado State Rams) and baseball coach (Maine Black Bears).
- Jean-Pierre Marty, 91, French pianist and conductor.
- Jim McAndrew, 80, American professional baseball player (New York Mets, San Diego Padres), World Series champion (1969).
- Angela McCluskey, 64, Scottish singer (Wild Colonials) and songwriter ("Breathe").
- Louis Minetti, 98, French farmer and politician, senator (1978–1998).
- Grant Page, 85, Australian stuntman (The Man from Hong Kong, Mad Max) and actor (Roadgames), traffic collision.
- Beth Peters, 92, American actress (General Hospital, Back to School).
- Sven-Olof Sällström, 55, Swedish politician, MP (since 2010), bile duct and liver cancer.
- Romão dos Santos, 56, Bissau-Guinean football player (Lusitano) and manager (Sporting de Bissau, national team).
- Léon Semmeling, 84, Belgian footballer (Standard Liège, national team).
- Costas Soukoulis, 73, Greek optical physicist.
- Arne Alsåker Spilde, 86, Norwegian farmer and politician, MP (1973–1997).
- Péter Szalay, 64, Hungarian jurist, member of the Constitutional Court (2011–2023).
- Minori Terada, 81, Japanese actor (The Human Bullet, Sailor Suit and Machine Gun, Typhoon Club), lung cancer.
- Tsewang Choegyal Tethong, 89, Tibetan academic and politician.
- Frans de Waal, 75, Dutch primatologist (The Ape and the Sushi Master) and ethologist, stomach cancer.
- Paul Wallwork, 82, Samoan weightlifter and civil servant.
- Joshua Zak, 94, Israeli theoretical physicist (Zak transform) and writer.
- Zheng Zhenxiang, 94, Chinese archaeologist.

=== 15 ===
- Howard Atlee, 97, American press agent, publicist and dog breeder.
- João da Bega, 80, Brazilian businessman and politician, Santa Catarina MLA (1999).
- Emmet Bergin, 79, Irish actor (Glenroe, Excalibur, Veronica Guerin).
- Hans Blum, 95, German singer-songwriter ("Primaballerina").
- Antônio Fernando Brochini, 77, Brazilian Roman Catholic prelate, bishop of Jaboticabal (2003–2014) and bishop of Itumbiara (2014–2023).
- Joe Camp, 84, American film director (Benji, Hawmps!, The Double McGuffin) and writer.
- Maria Chwalibóg, 91, Polish actress (Mother Joan of the Angels, Man – Woman Wanted, Korczak).
- Paul Josef Cordes, 89, German Roman Catholic cardinal, president of the Pontifical Council Cor Unum (1995–2010), vice president of the Pontifical Council for the Laity (1980–1995) and auxiliary bishop of Paderborn (1976–1980).
- Larry Damon, 90, American four-time Olympic cross-country skier and biathlete.
- Ambroise Kotamba Djoliba, 86, Togolese Roman Catholic prelate, bishop of Sokodé (1993–2016).
- Ertuğrul Ergezen, 45, Turkish Olympic boxer.
- Donald Ferrell, 95, American politician.
- Terry Gygar, 76, Australian academic and politician, Queensland MLA (1974–1983, 1984–1989).
- Rolf Haikkola, 96, Finnish long-distance runner and coach.
- Salim Joubran, 76, Israeli jurist, justice of the Supreme Court (2003–2017).
- Francis Korn, 88, Argentine sociologist.
- Marian Król, 84, Polish agronomist and politician, MP (1985–1989, 1993–1997).
- Tomasz Łubieński, 85, Polish journalist (Nowe Książki, Tygodnik Solidarność) and writer.
- André Paradis, 84, French writer.
- Laxminarayan Ramdas, 90, Indian admiral, chief of naval staff (1990–1993).
- Aleksandr Shirvindt, 89, Russian stage and film actor (The Irony of Fate, Three Men in a Boat, Winter Evening in Gagra) and screenwriter.
- Josef Steinkogler, 69, Austrian business manager and politician, member of the Federal Council (2009–2013).
- William W. Tait, 95, American philosopher.
- Steve Tensi, 81, American football player (San Diego Chargers, Denver Broncos).
- Ghulam Arieff Tipoo, 92, Bangladeshi jurist, chief prosecutor of the International Crimes Tribunal (since 2010).
- Gordon Vance, 72, American politician, member of the Montana House of Representatives (2009–2015) and Senate (2015–2023).
- Helmut von Verschuer, 97, German civil servant.
- Vasileios Vyzas, 86, Greek physician and politician, MP (1996–2004).

=== 16 ===
- Abdul Hyee, 71, Bangladeshi politician, MP (since 2001).
- Sylvain Augier, 68, French radio and television presenter.
- Richard E. Benedick, 88, American diplomat, complications from dementia.
- Jean-Marie Borzeix, 82, French journalist, director of France Culture (1984–1997).
- Peter Brodrick, 86, English cricketer (Cambridge University).
- Antônio Carlos Chamariz, 68, Brazilian businessman and politician, federal deputy (2009–2011).
- Jared Cohon, 76, American academic administrator, president of Carnegie Mellon University (1997–2013).
- Betty Cole Dukert, 96, American television producer (Meet the Press), complications from Alzheimer's Disease.
- Dave Gunther, 86, American basketball player (Detroit Pistons, San Francisco Warriors).
- John Hudson, 83, Australian Olympic rower (1960).
- Franz Isser, 91, Austrian Olympic bobsledder.
- Werner Kaegi, 97, Swiss-French composer.
- Abul Kashem, 82, Bangladeshi politician, MP (2008–2012), respiratory failure.
- Nagamma Keshavamurthy, 90, Indian politician, Mysore MLA (1972–1977), Karnataka MLA (1978–1983, 1989–1993).
- Addold Mossin, 104, Estonian neopaganist, World War II veteran and political activist.
- Roger Pfund, 80, Swiss graphic artist.
- Gary Rardon, 80, American serial killer.
- David Seidler, 86, British-American screenwriter (The King's Speech, Quest for Camelot, Tucker: The Man and His Dream), Oscar winner (2010).
- Alan Sieroty, 93, American politician and attorney, member of the California State Assembly (1967–1977) and Senate (1977–1982).
- Don Smerek, 66, American football player (Dallas Cowboys), cancer.
- Meeli Sööt, 86, Estonian stage, television (Kelgukoerad) and film actress.
- André Van Maldeghem, 86, Belgian football player (Kortrijk) and manager (Mouscron, Kortrijk).

=== 17 ===
- Osvaldo Bender, 89, Brazilian businessman and politician, federal deputy (1987–1995).
- Ernesto Bergamasco, 74, Italian Olympic boxer (1972).
- Ernest Bryll, 89, Polish poet, writer, and journalist, ambassador to Ireland (1991–1995).
- Cola Boyy, 34, American musician.
- Sandra Crouch, 81, American gospel singer and minister, Grammy winner (1984).
- Steve Harley, 73, English musician (Steve Harley & Cockney Rebel), songwriter ("Make Me Smile (Come Up and See Me)", "Mr. Soft") and producer, cancer.
- Timothy Hayward, 82, American politician, member of the Vermont House of Representatives (1976–1978).
- Robin Hobbs, 81, English cricketer (Essex, Glamorgan, national team), complications from surgery.
- Nuno Júdice, 74, Portuguese essayist, poet and writer.
- Pinu Khan, 70, Bangladeshi politician, MP (2009–2019).
- Robert Klymasz, 87, Canadian folklorist.
- Slavka Kohout, 91, American figure skater and coach.
- Janusz Komender, 92, Polish doctor and politician, minister of health and welfare (1987–1988).
- István Lajtai, 79, Hungarian politician, MP (1994–1998).
- Niall McEneaney, 44, Irish hurler (Mattock Rangers, Louth), traffic collision.
- Hennadiy Moskal, 73, Ukrainian politician, twice governor of Zakarpattia Oblast, governor of Luhansk Oblast (2014–2015) and MP (2007–2014).
- Thierry Pelenga, 41–42, Central African warlord, leader of Anti-balaka (2018–2021). (death announced on this date)
- Cas Robinson, 88, American politician, member of the Georgia House of Representatives (1977–1987).
- Emmet Stagg, 79, Irish politician, TD (1987–2016).
- Suh Chung-hwa, 91, South Korean military officer and politician, minister of the interior (1980–1982, 1997), MP (1988–2000).
- Thein Nyunt, 75, Burmese military officer, mayor of Naypyidaw (2006–2011) and chairman of Naypyidaw Council (2011–2016), brain cancer.

=== 18 ===
- Carole-Marie Allard, 74, Canadian politician, MP (2000–2004).
- Daniel Barbu, 66, Romanian political scientist, senator (2012–2016) and minister of culture (2012–2013).
- Ron Baynham, 94, English footballer (Worcester City, Luton Town, national team).
- Claude Bisson, 92, Canadian jurist.
- Peter Bolliger, 86, Swiss rower, Olympic bronze medallist (1968).
- Jean-Maurice Bonneau, 64, French equestrian and coach.
- Zonia Bowen, 97, British writer and linguist, founder of Merched y Wawr.
- Gloria Comesaña, 77, Spanish philosopher.
- Nicandro Díaz González, 60, Mexican telenovela producer (Amores verdaderos, Soy tu dueña, Hasta el fin del mundo).
- Rose Dugdale, 82, English paramilitary leader (Provisional IRA).
- François Dupuy, 76, French management scholar and consultant.
- Howell M. Estes III, 82, American general.
- Hugo Fernández, 93, Chilean Olympic basketball player (1952).
- Geoffrey Fryer, 96, British biologist.
- George Garrett, 89, Canadian broadcast journalist (CKNW).
- Jimmy Hastings, 85, British musician (Caravan, Soft Machine, Hatfield and the North).
- Joan Hills, 92, British artist.
- Khalid, 60, Bangladeshi singer, heart attack.
- Konstantin Koltsov, 42, Belarusian ice hockey player (Pittsburgh Penguins, Salavat Yulaev Ufa, national team), suicide by jumping.
- Peter Kunter, 82, German footballer (Freiburger FC, Eintracht Frankfurt).
- Jennifer Leak, 76, Canadian actress (Yours, Mine and Ours, The Young and the Restless, Another World), progressive supranuclear palsy.
- Faiq Al-Mabhouh, 55, Palestinian crisis management administrator, killed.
- Angel Marin, 82, Bulgarian politician, vice president (2002–2012).
- Peter McAleese, 81, Scottish soldier and mercenary.
- Pearse McAuley, 59, Northern Irish paramilitary (Provisional IRA) and convicted criminal. (body discovered on this date)
- Roy McMurtry, 91, Canadian politician and lawyer, Ontario MPP (1975–1985) and chief justice (1996–2007).
- Joana Neves, 37, Brazilian swimmer, Paralympic silver medallist (2016), cardiac arrest.
- Mary Jane Phillips, 92, Canadian chemical engineer.
- Chavelita Pinzón, 93, Panamanian folklorist and singer.
- Parashu Pradhan, 80, Nepali author.
- James D. Robinson III, 88, American bank holding executive, CEO of American Express (1977–1993), respiratory failure.
- Joaquim Santos, 71, Portuguese rally driver.
- Kenjiro Shinozuka, 75, Japanese rally driver, pancreatic cancer.
- Chris Simon, 52, Canadian ice hockey player (Washington Capitals, Quebec Nordiques, New York Islanders), Stanley Cup champion (1996), suicide.
- Thomas P. Stafford, 93, American astronaut (Gemini 6A, Gemini 9A, Apollo 10), liver cancer.
- Evan Stark, 82, American sociologist (coercive control).
- Kenneth D. Stofferahn, 89, American politician, member of the South Dakota House of Representatives (1975–1976).
- Thomas Tedder, 67, American immunologist.
- Kevin Toney, 70, American jazz pianist (The Blackbyrds) and composer, cancer.
- Tone Vigeland, 85, Norwegian jewellery designer.
- James M. Ward, 72, American game designer (Deities & Demigods, Greyhawk Adventures) and author (Pool of Radiance).

=== 19 ===
- Raymond Boulanger, 76, Canadian bush pilot and drug trafficker, cancer.
- BrolyLegs, 35, American professional gamer (Street Fighter).
- Margarita Cano, 92, Cuban-born American artist.
- Neeli Cherkovski, 78, American poet.
- Richard W. Conway, 92, American industrial engineer and computer scientist.
- Réda Dalil, 45, Moroccan journalist and writer, complications from surgery.
- Eberhard Dall'Asta, 84, German academic and politician, member of the Landtag of Schleswig-Holstein (1979–2000).
- Nat Dye, 86, American football player (Edmonton Eskimos, Saskatchewan Roughriders).
- Karla Erbová, 90, Czech poet, prose writer, and journalist.
- Léonard Forest, 96, Canadian filmmaker (Walls of Memory).
- Joachim Franke, 83, German speed skating coach, ice hockey player (SG Dynamo Weißwasser, East Germany national team) and coach.
- Takanori Fukushima, 81, Japanese neurosurgeon.
- Sebastian Haion, 51, Israeli soldier, killed.
- Simeon Jakovlevič, 98, Czech Orthodox prelate.
- Karl-Josef Jochem, 71, German police officer and politician, member of the Landtag of Saarland (1992–1994, 2004–2012).
- Malang Mané, 80, Senegalese Olympic sprinter.
- Ersen Martin, 44, Turkish footballer (Denizlispor, Ankaraspor, national team), complications from an aortic rupture.
- Yves Michaud, 94, Canadian politician, Quebec MNA (1966–1970).
- Rod Oram, 73, British-born New Zealand journalist and commentator (Sunday Star-Times, The New Zealand Herald), traffic collision.
- Michael Senyimba, 86, Ugandan Anglican clergyman, bishop of Mukono (1995–2002).
- Hideki Seo, 49, Japanese-born French fashion designer and artist.
- Jean-Luc Seret, 72, French chess International Master.
- Martin Skaba, 88, German footballer (BFC Dynamo, East German national team). (death announced on this date)
- Neil Thimbleby, 84, New Zealand rugby union player (Hawke's Bay, national team).
- Vasily Utkin, 52, Russian sports reporter, author, and television host, pulmonary embolism.
- Alden Vaughan, 95, American historian, heart attack.
- Jan de Vries, 80, Dutch footballer (PEC Zwolle).
- M. Emmet Walsh, 88, American actor (Blade Runner, Blood Simple, Fletch), cardiac arrest.
- Yang Shi'e, 92, Chinese underwater acoustic engineer.

=== 20 ===
- Nathan Agostinelli, 93, American politician, Connecticut state comptroller (1971–1975), mayor of Manchester, Connecticut (1966–1971).
- Saeed Ahmed, 86, Pakistani cricketer (national team).
- Faramarz Aslani, 79, Iranian singer, guitarist and music producer, cancer.
- Rodney Bernstein, 86, Irish cricketer (national team).
- Mark Blankfield, 73, American actor (Fridays, Robin Hood: Men in Tights, Dracula: Dead and Loving It).
- Bennett Braun, 83, American psychiatrist.
- Jean Breaux, 65, American politician, member of the Indiana Senate (2006–2024).
- Carmen Cavalli, 86, American football player (Oakland Raiders).
- Dianne Crittenden, 82, American casting director (Star Wars, Witness, Pretty Woman), cancer.
- Muhammad Alwi Dahlan, 90, Indonesian politician, minister of information (1998).
- George Darko, 73, Ghanaian burger-highlife musician.
- Milton Diamond, 90, American academic (University of Hawaiʻi at Mānoa).
- Sten Elfström, 81, Swedish actor (Real Humans, Kronprinsessan, Beck – Annonsmannen).
- Alfred M. Gray Jr., 95, American military officer, commandant of the Marine Corps (1987–1991).
- Martin Greenfield, 95, American master tailor.
- Odell Jones, 71, American baseball player (Pittsburgh Pirates, Texas Rangers, Milwaukee Brewers).
- Billy Kellock, 70, Scottish footballer (Cardiff City, Peterborough United, Wolverhampton Wanderers).
- Gary Koepke, 68, American creative director, musician and painter, co-founder of Modernista!.
- Winai Kraibutr, 54, Thai actor (Nang Nak, The Snake King's Child, Queens of Langkasuka), blood infection.
- Laetitia Krupa, 48, French political journalist.
- Laurence Levitan, 90, American politician, member of the Maryland House of Delegates (1970–1974) and Senate (1974–1994), congestive heart failure.
- Li Junxian, 96, Chinese chemist, heart failure.
- Phil Lowe, 74, English rugby league player (Hull Kingston Rovers, Manly Sea Eagles, national team) and coach.
- Dumitru Macri, 92, Romanian football player (Rapid București, national team) and manager (Algeria national team).
- Firmin Mattis, 94, French Olympic alpine skier (1952).
- Cocky Mazzetti, 87, Italian singer.
- Agnes Muszyńska, 88, Polish-American mechanical engineer.
- North Light, 23, Irish-bred British Thoroughbred racehorse, euthanized.
- António Pacheco, 57, Portuguese football player (Benfica, national team) and manager (Portimonense), heart attack.
- Willie Pye, 59, American murderer, lethal injection.
- Benoît Rayski, 86, French essayist and journalist (Atlantico, France-Soir, Causeur).
- La Schelle Tarver, 65, American baseball player (Boston Red Sox).
- Vernor Vinge, 79, American science fiction author (A Fire Upon the Deep, A Deepness in the Sky, Rainbows End), complications from Parkinson's disease.
- Wang Shih-hsiung, 63, Taiwanese politician, MP (1990–1996), pancreatic cancer.

=== 21 ===
- Orlando Aravena, 81, Chilean football player (La Serena, Colo-Colo) and manager (national team), complications from Alzheimer's disease.
- David Attwood, 71, British film director (Shot Through the Heart, To the Ends of the Earth, Fidel), Alzheimer's disease.
- David Ben Avraham, 63, Palestinian Jewish convert, shot.
- Jean-Louis Biget, 86, French historian.
- Bob Birrell, 86, British Olympic hurdler (1960).
- Ger Brady, 44, Irish Gaelic footballer (Ballina Stephenites, Mayo), motor neurone disease.
- Pierre Cordier, 91, Belgian artist.
- Marcel Fernandez, 94, French racing cyclist.
- Lorraine Graves, 66, American ballerina.
- István Gyenesei, 75, Hungarian politician, minister of local government (2008–2009)
- Ron Harper, 91, American actor (Planet of the Apes, Land of the Lost, Generations).
- Kelly Hoare, 60, Australian politician, MP (1998–2007).
- Willie James Hodges, 63, American murderer.
- Hans Hamilton, 4th Baron HolmPatrick, 69, British hereditary peer, member of the House of Lords (1991–1999).
- David Jackson, 87, English footballer (Bradford City, Tranmere Rovers, Halifax Town).
- Matthias Jarke, 71, German computer scientist.
- Markus Jooste, 63, South African businessman, CEO of Steinhoff International (2000–2017), suicide by gunshot.
- Daniel P. Jordan, 85, American historian.
- Lee Kee Hiong, 58, Malaysian politician, Selangor MLA (since 2013), cancer.
- Hal Malchow, 72, American political consultant, assisted suicide.
- Mary Meyers, 78, American speed skater, Olympic silver medalist (1968).
- Frédéric Mitterrand, 76, French politician, minister of culture and communication (2009–2012), cancer.
- Wolfgang Plottke, 83, German rower, Olympic bronze medalist (1972).
- Richard Quinn, 79, American political consultant.
- Joseph J. Redden, 81, American lieutenant general.
- Christian Rodska, 78, English actor (Follyfoot, The Monuments Men, Assassin's Creed IV: Black Flag), cancer.
- Laurens van Rooyen, 88, Dutch pianist and composer.
- Zenaida Seva, Filipino astrologer and television presenter.
- Sarah-Ann Shaw, 90, American journalist and television reporter (WBZ-TV).
- Barry Silver, 67, American attorney, rabbi and politician, member of the Florida House of Representatives (1996–1998), colon cancer.
- Clemens Starck, 86, American poet.
- Monika Werner, 86, German politician, State Council member (1986–1990), MP (1963–1989), mayor of Hennigsdorf (1974–1990).
- Larry J. Young, 56, American psychiatrist, heart attack.

=== 22 ===
- Zafar Agha, 70, Indian journalist (National Herald, Navjivan, Qaumi Awaz), cardiac arrest.
- Peter Bennett, 77, English footballer (Leyton Orient, West Ham United).
- Valdir Birigui, 80, Brazilian footballer (São Paulo, Botafogo).
- Paulo Konder Bornhausen, 94, Brazilian lawyer and politician, Santa Catarina MLA (1955–1959), multiple organ failure.
- Laurent de Brunhoff, 98, French author (Babar), complications from a stroke.
- Luigi Cimnaghi, 83, Italian Olympic gymnast (1964, 1968) and sports administrator.
- Eilish Cleary, 60, Irish-born Canadian physician and health advocate, ovarian cancer.
- Partha Sarathi Deb, 68, Indian actor (Kakababu Here Gelen?, Lathi, Prem Aamar), chronic obstructive pulmonary disease.
- Bill Deegan, 88, American baseball umpire.
- Franz Dietl, 90, German Roman Catholic prelate, auxiliary bishop of Munich and Freising (1999–2010).
- Art Ellison, 80, American politician, member of the New Hampshire House of Representatives (since 2018).
- Francisco Gil Craviotto, 91, Spanish writer, journalist and translator.
- Martin L. Greenberg, 92, American politician, member of the New Jersey Senate (1974–1979).
- Patricia Hall, 84, English novelist and journalist.
- Tibor Holéczy, 80, Hungarian Olympic cross-country skier (1968).
- Bronco Lane, 78, British army officer and author, complications from Alzheimer's disease.
- Jimmy Mataya, 73, American pool player and actor (The Color of Money).
- Carl A. Parker, 89, American politician, member of the Texas House of Representatives (1962–1977) and Senate (1977–1995).
- Erving Polster, 101, Czech psychologist, pioneer of Gestalt therapy.
- Alek Popov, 58, Bulgarian writer, essayist and scriptwriter.
- Damodar Rout, Indian politician, Odisha MLA (2009–2019).
- Leo Sanford, 94, American football player (Chicago Cardinals, Baltimore Colts).
- Chuck Seelbach, 76, American baseball player (Detroit Tigers).
- Ti Greg, Haitian gang leader, shot.
- Anne-Marie Trégouët, 99, French veteran.
- Jean-Paul Vignon, 89, Ethiopian-born French-American actor (The Devil's Brigade) and singer, liver cancer.
- Peter Wilson, 81, British Olympic field hockey player (1968).

=== 23 ===
- John Anderson, 75, Northern Irish musician and record producer.
- Peter Angelos, 94, American lawyer and baseball executive, owner of the Baltimore Orioles (since 1993).
- Linda Bean, 82, American retailer (L.L.Bean).
- Fred Bednarski, 87, Polish-born American college football player (Texas Longhorns).
- Daniel Beretta, 77, French actor (Revolver, Faceless).
- Edmund Bohan, 88, New Zealand historian.
- George Bruce, 81, English-born Canadian bishop.
- David Capper, 91, Northern Irish journalist (BBC).
- Leszek Długosz, 82, Polish actor (The Third Part of the Night, On the Silver Globe, Smolensk), poet and composer.
- Brigitte García, 27, Ecuadorian politician, mayor of San Vicente (since 2023), shot.
- Ulf Georgsson, 61, Swedish songwriter and drummer (Flamingokvintetten).
- Kumudini Hajong, 93–94, Bangladeshi revolutionary, indigenous and secular rights activist.
- Roberta Karmel, 86, American lawyer, pancreatic cancer.
- Benny Keister, 83, American politician, member of the Virginia House of Delegates (2000–2005), mayor of Dublin, Virginia (1989–1997).
- Shahryar Khan, 89, Pakistani diplomat, foreign secretary (1990–1994) and chairman of the Pakistan Cricket Board (2003–2006, 2014–2017).
- Nicolae Manolescu, 84, Romanian literary critic.
- Paul Masnick, 92, Canadian ice hockey player (Montreal Canadiens, Toronto Maple Leafs, Chicago Black Hawks).
- C. P. Mudalagiriyappa, 83, Indian politician, MP (1989–1996, 1998–1999) and Karnataka MLA (1985–1989).
- Eli Noyes, 81, American animator (Liquid Television), complications from prostate cancer.
- Igor Ozim, 92, Slovene classical violinist and pedagogue.
- Maurizio Pollini, 82, Italian pianist.
- Rati Ram, 89, Indian-born American academic.
- Manuel Ruiz de Lopera, 79, Spanish businessman and sports executive, president of Real Betis (1996–2006).
- Mustafa Jaffer Sabodo, 81, Tanzanian economic consultant.
- Salim Salimov, 82, Azerbaijani politician, deputy (1990–1995).
- Serhiy Shevchenko, 66, Ukrainian football player (Krystal Kherson, MFK Mykolaiv, FC Bălți) and manager.
- Abdulah Sidran, 79, Bosnian poet and screenwriter (Do You Remember Dolly Bell?, When Father Was Away on Business, The Perfect Circle).
- Milt Sonsky, 82, American Olympic javelin thrower (1972).
- Jerry Steelsmith, 88, American professional golfer.
- Mike Thaler, 87, American author and illustrator.
- Silvia Tortosa, 77, Spanish actress (Horror Express, The Loreley's Grasp, The Girl from the Red Cabaret), cancer.

=== 24 ===
- George Abbey, 91, American engineer, director of the Johnson Space Center (1996–2001).
- Heather Allan, 82, New Zealand politician.
- Martin Bax, 90, British consultant paediatrician and publisher, founder of Ambit.
- Gullu Butt, Pakistani vandal.
- Denis Clavel, 81, French poet and politician, mayor of Arâches-la-Frasse (1971–1983).
- Malcolm Colmer, 79, British Anglican priest, archdeacon of Middlesex (1996–2005) and Hereford (2005–2010).
- Samantha Davis, 53, British actress (Through the Dragon's Eye) and philanthropist.
- Def Rhymz, 53, Surinamese-Dutch rapper, heart failure.
- Luis H. Ducoing Gamba, 86, Mexican politician, governor of Guanajuato (1973–1979).
- Ward Edwards, 94, American politician, member of the Georgia House of Representatives (1967–1992).
- Péter Eötvös, 80, Hungarian composer (Love and Other Demons, Three Sisters) and conductor (Ensemble intercontemporain).
- Alex Gitterman, 86, Polish-born American social work educator.
- Tina Gloriani, 88, Italian actress (The Dragon's Blood, The Vampire and the Ballerina, The Fury of Achilles).
- Judith Hemmendinger, 100, German-born Israeli researcher and author.
- Anna 'Matlelima Hlalele, 94, Mosotho politician, fall.
- Aino Kapsta, 88, Estonian metalsmith and jeweler.
- Gerd Klamt, 81, German-born Austrian engineer and politician, member of the Federal Council (2000–2004).
- David J. Lane, 60, German-born Canadian astronomer.
- Gunilla Lundberg, 67, Swedish Olympic swimmer (1976).
- Mike Mercer, 88, American football player (Oakland Raiders, Minnesota Vikings, Green Bay Packers).
- Philippe Minard, 62, French academic researcher and historian.
- Robert Moskowitz, 88, American painter, complications from Parkinson's disease.
- Amaechi Muonagor, 61, Nigerian actor (Karishika, Aki na Ukwa, Aki and Pawpaw), kidney failure.
- Saravuth Parthipakoranchai, 76, Thai Olympic footballer (1968).
- Marjorie Perloff, 92, American poetry scholar.
- Tomislav Peternek, 90, Serbian photographer and artist.
- Andrew Plympton, 74, Australian football executive, president of St Kilda (1993–2000), lung cancer.
- T. N. Prakash, 68, Indian writer.
- Violetta Quesada, 76, Cuban sprinter, Olympic silver medallist (1968).
- Zoila Quiñones, 83, Mexican actress (Canción de amor, Soñadoras, Amigas y rivales).
- Gordon Singleton, 67, Canadian Olympic cyclist (1976), prostate cancer.
- Imogen Stuart, 96, German-Irish sculptor.
- Terence Suthers, 79, British conservator and museum curator.
- Howard Swenson, 93, American politician, member of the Minnesota House of Representatives (1995–2004).
- Margot Theben, 89, German politician, member of the Landtag of Brandenburg (1990–1999).
- John Tia, 69, Ghanaian politician, MP (1993–2013) and minister for information (2010–2012).
- Herb Travenio, 91, American football player (San Diego Chargers).
- José Agustín Valbuena Jáuregui, 96, Colombian Roman Catholic prelate, bishop of Valledupar (1977–2003).
- Lou Whittaker, 95, American mountaineer.
- Don Wright, 90, American cartoonist, Pulitzer Prize winner (1966, 1980).
- Joyce Yakubowich, 70, Canadian Olympic sprinter (1972, 1976).

=== 25 ===
- Laurent Achard, 59, French film director and screenwriter (Le Dernier des fous).
- Claude Alphandéry, 101, French resistance member, banker and economist.
- Ushio Amagatsu, 74, Japanese choreographer, heart failure.
- Humphrey Campbell, 66, Surinamese-Dutch singer, cancer.
- Michael Coady, 84, Irish poet.
- Chris Cross, 71, English musician (Ultravox, Tiger Lily) and songwriter ("Vienna").
- Jonathan Diller, 31, American police officer, shot.
- Dave Forbes, 75, Canadian ice hockey player (Boston Bruins, Washington Capitals).
- Richard R. Freeman, 79, American physicist and academic.
- Alesia Graf, 43, Belarusian-born German boxer, WIBF super-flyweight champion (2008–2009).
- Elisabeth Guttenberger, 98, German Holocaust survivor and human rights activist, witness at Frankfurt Auschwitz trials.
- L. Jane Hastings, 96, American architect.
- Ian Heads, 81, Australian rugby league historian, journalist (The Sydney Morning Herald, Rugby League Week) and author.
- Lauri Heikkilä, 66, Finnish politician, MP (2011–2015).
- Andries Hoogerwerf, 92, Dutch political scientist and public administration scholar.
- Theodore W. McFarling, 94, American politician, member of the South Dakota House of Representatives (1955–1956).
- Maurice El Médiouni, 95, Algerian pianist, singer, and composer.
- Mahbod Moghadam, 41, American internet entrepreneur, co-founder of Genius, complications from a brain tumor.
- Philip Needleman, 85, American academic and pharmacologist.
- Ambrogio Pelagalli, 84, Italian footballer (Milan, Atalanta, Roma).
- Awuley Quaye, Ghanaian footballer (Accra Great Olympics, national team).
- Estel Robirds, 89, American politician, member of the Missouri House of Representatives (1993–2003).
- Nancy Valverde, 92, American LGBT rights activist.
- Diana Wall, 80, American environmental scientist and soil ecologist.
- Dean Wasson, 93, Canadian politician.
- Paula Weinstein, 78, American film producer (The Perfect Storm, The Fabulous Baker Boys, Blood Diamond).
- Fritz Wepper, 82, German actor (Derrick, Cabaret, Die Brücke).

=== 26 ===
- Hashimi El-Bahlul, 79, Libyan football player and manager (Al Ahli SC, national team).
- Lamine Bangura, 59, Sierra Leonean footballer (ASEC Mimosas, national team), traffic collision.
- Kay Benbow, 62, British television executive (CBeebies).
- Donald N. Bersoff, 85, American psychologist.
- Gisela Birkemeyer, 92, German sprint runner, Olympic silver medallist (1956).
- Michael Collins, 86, English footballer (Luton Town, Bedford Town, Chelmsford City).
- Esther Coopersmith, 94, American diplomat, UNESCO goodwill ambassador (since 2009), cancer.
- Peter Gardiner-Hill, 97, English cricketer (Oxford University).
- Gerhard Gepp, 83, Austrian illustrator, painter, and graphic designer.
- Enrico Giusti, 83, Italian mathematician.
- Danka Ilić, 1, Serbian girl, killed.
- Chandra Kumara Kandanarachchi, 76, Sri Lankan singer.
- Brigid Kelly, 40, American politician, member of the Ohio House of Representatives (2017–2022), esophageal cancer.
- Andy Liu, 77, Canadian mathematician.
- Rajmund Miller, 69, Polish doctor and politician, MP (since 2011), cancer.
- Slađana Milošević, 68, Serbian singer, songwriter and record producer, Sjögren syndrome.
- George Nicolescu, 74, Romanian musician.
- Wole Oguntokun, 56, Nigerian playwright.
- Richard Phelan, 86, American politician, president of the Cook County Board of Commissioners (1990–1994), cancer.
- Richard Serra, 85, American visual artist, pneumonia.
- Lollu Sabha Seshu, 60, Indian actor (Lollu Sabha, Vadakkupatti Ramasamy, 80s Buildup), heart attack.
- Zahra Shojaei, 67, Iranian politician.
- Swami Smaranananda, 94, Indian Hindu leader, president of Ramakrishna Mission (since 2017).
- Ana Starck-Stănișel, 89, Romanian handball player (Rapid București, national team).
- Emmanuel Terray, 89, French anthropologist and political activist.
- André Van Herpe, 90, Belgian footballer (K.A.A. Gent, national team).
- Giuliano Vangi, 93, Italian sculptor, leukemia.
- Pål Wessel, 64, Norwegian geologist.
- Ihor Yukhnovskyi, 98, Ukrainian physicist and politician, first deputy prime minister (1992–1993) and MP (1990–2006).

=== 27 ===
- Namig Abbasov, 84, Azerbaijani diplomat and politician, minister of national security (1995–2004).
- Angelo Abenante, 96, Italian politician, senator (1968–1976) and deputy (1963–1968).
- Fāṭimah al-Baqqālī, 50, Emirati calligrapher, decorator, and visual artist
- Andriy Antonyshchak, 54, Ukrainian politician, MP (2014–2019), complications from wounds sustained in action.
- Tuisugaletaua Sofara Aveau, 71, Samoan politician, MP (2001–2016).
- Robert Beerbohm, 71, American comic book historian, cancer.
- Eddy Braem, 80, Belgian footballer (Royal Antwerp).
- Stein Bråten, 89, Norwegian sociologist and social psychologist.
- M. D. Bright, 68, American comic book artist (Armor Wars, Emerald Dawn).
- Choi Dae-shik, 59, South Korean footballer (Lucky-Goldstar / LG Cheetahs, Daewoo Royals, national team).
- Rance Cleaveland, 62, American computer scientist.
- Petra Deimer, 76, German marine biologist and nature conservationist.
- Aleksandr Domashev, 65, Russian Olympic field hockey player (1988, 1992).
- Shagdaryn Dulmaa, 89–90, Mongolian poet and journalist.
- Paul Ernst, 88, Austrian Olympic biathlete (1964, 1968).
- Harry E. Gallagher Jr., 92, American politician, member of the Missouri House of Representatives (1972–1974).
- Reynaldo Garrido, 89, Cuban tennis player.
- George Gilbey, 40, English television personality (Gogglebox) and reality show contestant (Celebrity Big Brother), fall.
- Avraham Grossman, 88, Israeli historian.
- Russell Hamer, 76–77, Sri Lankan cricketer (national team).
- John Hargreaves, 78, English snooker player.
- Alfred Hassner, 93, Israeli organic chemist.
- Tony Heard, 86, South African journalist and author.
- Sara Japhet, 89, Israeli biblical scholar.
- Daniel Kahneman, 90, Israeli-American author (Thinking, Fast and Slow), psychologist, and economist, Nobel laureate (2002).
- Lou Kilzer, 73, American journalist (The Denver Post).
- La Castou, 75, Swiss actress, singer, and dancer.
- Joe Lieberman, 82, American politician, member of the U.S. Senate (1989–2013) and Connecticut State Senate (1971–1981), Connecticut attorney general (1983–1989), complications from a fall.
- James R. McNutt, 89, American politician, member of the Michigan House of Representatives (1991–1998).
- Thomas Mensah, 74, Ghanaian chemical engineer.
- James A. Moore, 58, American horror novelist (Subject Seven, Bloodstained Oz), short story writer, and role-playing game author.
- Valerie O'Leary, 53, Irish scientist and researcher.
- Francisco Prat, 75, Chilean politician and businessman, senator (1990–2002) and governor of Malleco Province (1989–1990).
- Karl Reger, 93, German Roman Catholic prelate, auxiliary bishop of Aachen (1987–2006).
- Stanisława Ryster, 81, Polish lawyer and television presenter.
- John Alfred Talent, 91, Australian geologist and paleontologist.
- Concepció Tarruella, 74, Spanish politician and nurse, deputy (2008–2015) and member of the Catalan parliament (1992–2003).
- Georgios Terzopoulos, 93, Greek farmer and politician, MP (1981–1993).
- Carlos Tünnerman, 90, Nicaraguan lawyer, diplomat, and educator.
- Esiteri Vakalala-Kamikamica, 85, Fijian education trade unionist (Fiji Teachers Union) and women's rights activist (National Council of Women of Fiji).

=== 28 ===
- Rahib Aliyev, 78, Azerbaijani actor (The Scoundrel).
- Ross J. Anderson, 67, British computer security researcher and author.
- Mukhtar Ansari, 60, Indian politician and gangster, Uttar Pradesh MLA (1996–2022), heart attack.
- Irena Bačiulytė, 85, Lithuanian rower.
- Désirée Bernard, 85, Guyanese jurist, Chief Justice of Guyana (2001–2005).
- Bunyan Bryant, 89, American academic, cancer.
- Chi Pang-yuan, 100, Taiwanese translator.
- Kurt Elimä, 84, Swedish Olympic ski jumper (1964, 1968).
- A. Ganeshamurthi, 76, Indian politician, MP (1998–1999, 2009–2014, since 2019) and once Tamil Nadu MLA, suicide by poisoning.
- Horațiu Giurgiu, 85, Romanian basketball player (CS Dinamo București, national team).
- Guy Goffette, 76, Belgian poet and writer.
- Mike Green, 75, American politician, member of the Michigan House of Representatives (1995–2000) and Senate (2011–2019), cancer.
- Tom Henry, 72, American politician, mayor of Fort Wayne, Indiana (since 2008), stomach cancer.
- Nozir Hossain, 75, Bangladeshi politician, MP (1991–1996, 2001–2008).
- Isa Kasimi, 62, Latvian chess master.
- Robert J. LaFortune, 97, American politician, mayor of Tulsa, Oklahoma (1970–1978).
- Limestone Lad, 31, Irish Thoroughbred racehorse.
- Larry Lloyd, 75, English football player (Liverpool, national team) and manager (Wigan Athletic).
- Yuri Lushchai, 42, Ukrainian Wikipedian.
- Ma Shitu, 109, Chinese writer and politician, deputy (1983–1993).
- Joseph P. Manning, 97, American politician, member of the New Hampshire House of Representatives (1992–2004).
- Natalya Melyokhina, 61, Russian road cyclist.
- Mike Murray, 93, British cricketer (Middlesex, Combined Services, MCC) and banker.
- Bill Neal, 92, American football player and coach (Indiana University of Pennsylvania).
- Luciano Ortelli, 67, Italian Olympic wrestler (1984).
- Winston Register, 88, American politician, member of the North Dakota House of Representatives (1969–1970).
- Mark Spiro, 67, American songwriter ("Are You Still in Love with Me", "I'll See You in My Dreams", "Mighty Wings") and record producer, lung cancer.
- Deanna Syme Tewari, 85, Indian athlete.
- Raad Thabet, Palestinian militant, killed.
- Walt Wesley, 79, American basketball player (Cincinnati Royals, Chicago Bulls, Cleveland Cavaliers), leukemia.
- Marian Zazeela, 83, American visual and musical artist.

=== 29 ===
- Jules Ajodhia, 79, Surinamese politician, vice president (1991–1996, 2000–2005) and minister of justice (1988–1990).
- Daniel Balaji, 48, Indian actor (Kaadhal Kondein, Chirutha, Gnana Kirukkan), heart attack.
- Habib Benmimoun, 66, Algerian footballer (MC Oran, USM Bel Abbès, national team).
- George Henry Cassidy, 81, British Anglican prelate, bishop of Southwell and Nottingham (1999–2009).
- Gerry Conway, 76, English drummer and percussionist (Jethro Tull, Fairport Convention, Cat Stevens), complications from motor neurone disease.
- Simeone Di Cagno Abbrescia, 79, Italian politician, deputy (2006–2013) and mayor of Bari (1995–2004).
- Katsura Funakoshi, 72, Japanese sculptor, lung cancer.
- Louis Gossett Jr., 87, American actor (An Officer and a Gentleman, Roots, Iron Eagle), Oscar winner (1982), complications from COPD.
- Trevor Griffiths, 88, English screenwriter (Reds), heart failure.
- Carol Jennings, 70, British activist and campaigner, complications from Alzheimer's disease.
- Péter Juhász, 75, Hungarian footballer (Újpesti Dózsa, Tatabánya, national team), Olympic silver medallist (1972).
- Hugh Lawson, 82, American jurist, judge (since 1995) and chief judge (2006–2008) of the U.S. District Court of Middle Georgia.
- Ray Lewis, 61, Guyanese-born British youth worker, deputy mayor of London (2008).
- Emilio Lora-Tamayo, 73, Spanish physicist and academic, president of the Spanish National Research Council (2003–2004, 2012–2017).
- Iain McChesney, 79, Scottish footballer (Queen of the South).
- Hans Joachim Meyer, 87, German linguist (HU Berlin) and politician (Minister of Education in East Germany), president of the Central Committee of German Catholics 1995–2009
- Meenakshi Patil, 76, Indian politician, Maharashtra MLA (1995–2004, 2009–2014).
- Chance Perdomo, 27, American-British actor (Chilling Adventures of Sabrina, Gen V, After We Fell), traffic collision.
- Alf Petersson, 91, Swedish Olympic sprinter (1960).
- Preto, 37, Brazilian footballer (Ceará, Mirassol, Cuiabá).
- Werner Schmidt, 92, Canadian politician, MP (1993–2006).
- Wayne Schurr, 86, American baseball player (Chicago Cubs).
- Peter Shapiro, 71, American businessman and politician, member of the New Jersey General Assembly (1976–1979), Essex County Executive (1979–1987), respiratory failure.
- Silver Cat, 53, Mexican professional wrestler.
- Michael Simmons, American Orthodox Anglican Communion prelate.
- Len Skowronski, 83, Canadian politician.
- Berndt Söderborg, 90, Swedish chess player.
- Evelyne Sossouhounto, 67, Beninese teacher and politician.
- Kenji Suzuki, 95, Japanese television announcer (NHK).
- Denny Walsh, 88, American journalist (St. Louis Globe-Democrat), Pulitzer prize winner (1969).

=== 30 ===
- Martín Almada, 87, Paraguayan lawyer and human rights activist (Archives of Terror).
- Casey Benjamin, 45, American musician (Robert Glasper Experiment), producer, and songwriter, blood clot.
- Peggy Blackford, 82, American diplomat, ambassador to Guinea-Bissau (1995–1998).
- Michael de la Bastide, 86, Trinidadian jurist, chief justice (1995–2002).
- Bill Delahunt, 82, American politician, member of the U.S. House of Representatives (1997–2011) and Massachusetts House of Representatives (1973–1975).
- Earl Dittman, 64, American film critic.
- Dick Dowling, 85, Irish politician, senator (1982) and TD (1982–1987).
- Fred Gamble, 92, American racing driver.
- Quisqueya Henríquez, 58, Cuban-born Dominican artist.
- Ardeth G. Kapp, 93, Canadian cleric and writer.
- Yukiko Kato, 87, Japanese author, heart failure.
- Ulrike Koch, 73, German filmmaker (The Saltmen of Tibet).
- Víctor Legrotaglie, 86, Argentine football player (Gimnasia y Esgrima, Chacarita Juniors, Juventud Alianza) and manager.
- Daniel C. Lynch, 82, American computer network engineer.
- James Ross MacDonald, 101, American physicist.
- Robert I. Marshall, 77, American politician, member of the Delaware Senate (1979–2019).
- Tim McGovern, 68, American visual effects artist (Total Recall, Tron, Dunkirk), Oscar winner (1990).
- Alex McGregor, 73, Scottish footballer (Aldershot, Ayr United, Shrewsbury Town).
- Lee Mroszak, 55, American DJ (WINS-FM), complications from Guillain–Barré syndrome.
- Benoît Pelletier, 64, Canadian politician, Quebec MLA (1998–2008), minister of Aboriginial affairs (2003–2005, 2007–2008).
- Daniel Piksiades, 91, Serbian poet.
- Lasse Sigurd Seim, 80, Norwegian diplomat.
- Hari Sen, 68, Indian academic historian.
- Song Wenhan, 84, Chinese lieutenant general.
- Géza Tordy, 85, Hungarian actor (Suburban Legend, For Whom the Larks Sing, Sleepless Years) and film director.
- Les Twentyman, 76, Australian social campaigner.
- Vanhlupuii, 77, Indian Mizo vocalist, stroke and kidney disease.
- Mahmoud Khalil Zakzuk, Palestinian militant. (death announced on this date)

=== 31 ===
- John F. Asmus, 87, American research physicist and art conservator.
- Barbara Baldavin, 85, American actress (Medical Center, Star Trek) and casting director (Trapper John, M.D.), heart failure.
- Paul Bence, 75, English football player (Brentford, Reading) and manager (Wycombe Wanderers).
- Jonathan Bennett, 94, New Zealand-born British philosopher of language and metaphysics.
- Nigel Boston, 62, British-American mathematician.
- Terry Brown, 79, Solomon Islander Anglican prelate, bishop of Malaita (1996–2008).
- Paul Chantler, 64, British radio broadcaster, liver cancer.
- Hilbram Dunar, 48, Indonesian television presenter (RCTI, MNCTV, GTV) and radio broadcaster.
- Guylaine Guy, 94, Canadian singer and painter.
- Bonnie L. Jensen, 85, American missionary.
- Rob Kaman, 63, Dutch kickboxer and actor (Bloodfist).
- Stephen Kiggundu, 46, Ugandan military officer, deputy commander of the Uganda Air Force (since 2022), electrocuted.
- Tadeusz Kusy, 72, Polish Roman Catholic prelate, coadjutor bishop (2014–2015) and bishop (since 2015) of Kaga-Bandoro.
- F. A. Little Jr., 87, American jurist, judge for the United States District Court for the Western District of Louisiana (1984–2006).
- Michael McMartin, 79, Canadian-Australian music entrepreneur and manager (Hoodoo Gurus, Radio Birdman), cancer.
- Lionel Robberds, 84, Australian Olympic rower (1960).
- Barbara Rush, 97, American actress (It Came from Outer Space, Peyton Place, All My Children).
- Nijolė Sadūnaitė, 85, Lithuanian Roman Catholic nun.
- David D. Schaaf, 84–85, American politician, member of the Minnesota Senate (1973–1980). (death reported on this date)
- Pavel Svojanovský, 80, Czech rower, Olympic silver (1972) and bronze (1976) medallist.
- John Turtle, 87, Australian medical academic and endocrinologist.
- Jenny Vaughan, 55, British neurologist, cancer.
