= Henry Gallagher =

Henry or Harry Gallagher may refer to:

- Henry Joseph Gallagher (1914–1988), Korean War veteran
- Henry M. Gallagher (1885–1965), American lawyer and judge
- Harry Gallagher (businessman) (Henry Thomas Gallagher, 1880–1975), Irish businessman and solicitor
- Harry E. Gallagher Jr. (1932–2024), member of the Missouri House of Representatives
