= Joseph Manning =

Joseph Manning may refer to:

- Joseph S. Manning (1845–1905), U.S. Army private and Medal of Honor recipient
- Joseph P. Manning (Washington politician) (1827–1916), pioneer who crossed the Oregon Trail and member of the Washington Territory legislature
- Joseph P. Manning (New Hampshire politician), member of the New Hampshire House of Representatives
- M. Joseph Manning (1924–2015), American politician
- Joseph Manning (historian), professor of history at Yale University
