= Terzopoulos =

Terzopoulos is a Greek surname. Notable people with the surname include:

- Demetri Terzopoulos (born 1950s), Greek-Canadian-American computer scientist and entrepreneur
- Georgios Terzopoulos (1931–2024), Greek politician
- Theodoros Terzopoulos (born 1945), Greek theatre director
