= Francisco Gil Craviotto =

Spanish writer and journalist (1933–2024)

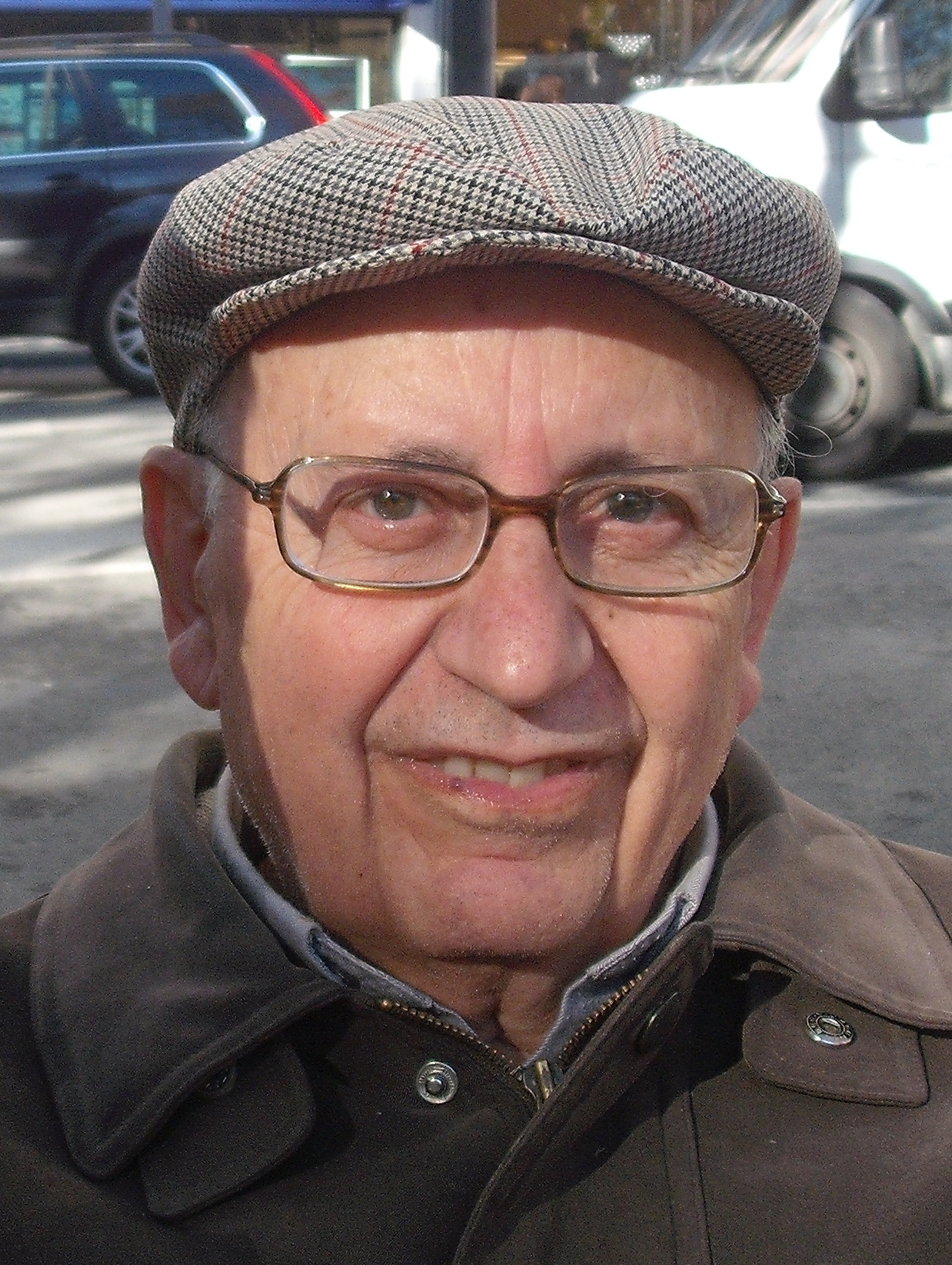
- Craviotto in 2013
- Born: 15 February 1933; Turón, Spain
- Died: 22 March 2024 (aged 91); Granada, Spain
- Education: Paris-Sorbonne University (Lic.); University of Paris
- Occupations: Writer; Journalist

Francisco Gil Craviotto (15 February 1933 – 22 March 2024) was a Spanish writer, journalist and translator. He was a member of the Academia de Buenas Letras de Granada.

== Biography ==
Born in Turón on 15 February 1933, Craviotto earned a licentiate in letters from Paris-Sorbonne University and later studied at the University of Paris. Fleeing the Franco regime, he stayed in Paris, working as a teacher and a translator and contributor to the Andalusian newspaper Ideal.

Craviotto returned to Spain in 1993 and wrote a variety of novels, including Los cuernos del difunto, La boda de Camacho, El Oratorio de las lágrimas, and La verja del internado. He also translated various works into Spanish, such as those by Voltaire, Octave Mirbeau, and Guy de Maupassant. In 2012, he joined the Academia de Buenas Letras de Granada. On 29 January 2019, he received the Medalla de oro de Granada.

Francisco Gil Craviotto died in Granada on 22 March 2024, at the age of 91.

== Works ==
- Raíces y tierra (1959)
- Los cuernos del difunto (1996)
- Retratos y semblanzas con la Alhambra al fondo (1999)
- Mis Paseos con Chica (2000)
- Casi unas memorias (2003)
- Nuevos retratos y semblanzas… (2003)
- El Caballero sin miedo (2003)
- La boda de Camacho (2004)
- Mesa de León, un periodista entre dos siglos (2005)
- Enrique Villar Yebra : su vida, su obra (2007)
- El Oratorio de las lágrimas (2008)
- El siglo que se nos fue (2010)
- La mano quemada (2013)
- La verja del internado (2013)
- La Cueva de la azanca (2014)
- Los Papeles de Juan Español (2016)
- Veinte mujeres inolvidables (2018)
- La alborada del ruiseñor (2019)
