= Josef Steinkogler =

Austrian business politician (1954–2024)

Member of the Federal Council of Austria
- In office 23 October 2009 – 2 December 2013

Personal details
- Born: 21 May 1954 Ebensee, Allied-occupied Austria
- Died: 15 March 2024 (aged 69)
- Party: ÖVP
- Occupation: Business manager

Josef Steinkogler (21 May 1954 – 15 March 2024) was an Austrian business manager and politician. A member of the Austrian People's Party, he served in the Federal Council from 2009 to 2013.

Steinkogler died on 15 March 2024, at the age of 69.
