= Louis Minetti =

French farmer and politician (1925–2024)

Member of the French Senate for Bouches-du-Rhône
- In office 1 October 1978 – 30 September 1998
- Preceded by: Léon David

Personal details
- Born: 1 September 1925 La Ciotat, France
- Died: 14 March 2024 (aged 98)
- Party: PCF
- Occupation: Farmer

Louis Minetti (1 September 1925 – 14 March 2024) was a French farmer and politician of the French Communist Party (PCF).

== Biography ==
Born in La Ciotat on 1 September 1925 to poor Italian parents, Minetti's father was a farmworker. During the German occupation, he was in contact with the French Resistance and the Spanish republicans and participated in the liberation of La Ciotat.

After the war, Minetti was elected to the national office of the Mouvement Jeunes Communistes de France and the Bouches-du-Rhône office of the PCF. In 1953, he became a fruit and vegetable farmer in Maillane alongside his wife, joining the agrarian section of the PCF shortly thereafter.

On 1 October 1978, Minetti joined the Senate after the departure of Léon David. He was re-elected in 1980 and 1989. He notably served as vice-president of the Economic Affairs Committee and authored a law passed on 3 January 1991 intended to protect forested areas. In December 1992, he was elected president of a Senate commission of inquiry into the fruit, vegetable, and flower market.

Louis Minetti died on 14 March 2024, at the age of 98.

== Publication ==
- De la Provence au Sénat - Itinéraire d'un militant communiste (2003)
