= Marian Król =

Polish politician (1939–2024)

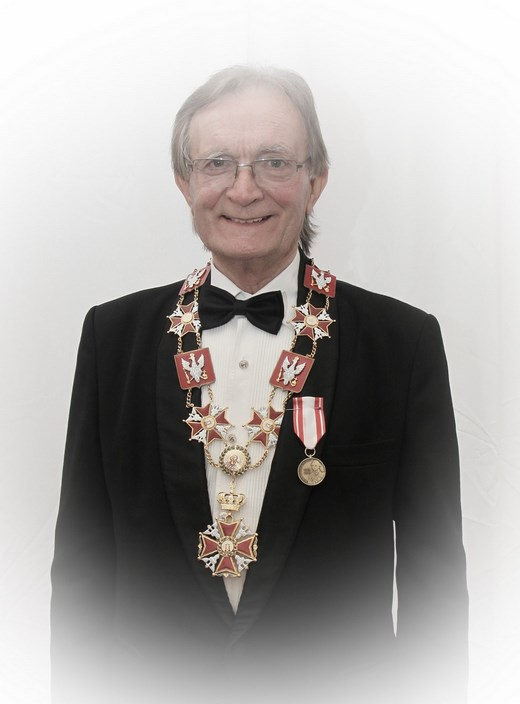
- Król in 2017

Member of the Sejm
- In office 19 September 1993 – 20 October 1997
- Constituency: Poznań
- In office 6 November 1985 – 30 May 1989

Voivode of Poznań
- In office 26 October 1981 – 9 January 1986
- Preceded by: Stanisław Cozaś
- Succeeded by: Bronisław Stęplowski

Personal details
- Born: 16 July 1939 Brodziszewo, Poland
- Died: 15 March 2024 (aged 84)
- Party: ZSL; PSL
- Education: University of Life Sciences in Poznań; Warsaw University of Life Sciences
- Occupation: Agronomist

Marian Król (16 July 1939 – 15 March 2024) was a Polish agronomist and politician. A member of the United People's Party and the Polish People's Party, he served in the Sejm from 1985 to 1989 and again from 1993 to 1997.

Król died on 15 March 2024, at the age of 84.
