= Alden Vaughan =

American historian (1929–2024)

Alden T. Vaughan (January 23, 1929 – March 19, 2024) was an American historian, having taught at Columbia University, published several books about New England and Indians in the 17th and 18th centuries and has been largely collected by libraries. His research studied the relationships between the Native Americans and non-native settlers. Vaughan died on March 19, 2024, at the age of 95.
