= Theodore W. McFarling =

American politician

Member of the South Dakota House of Representatives
- In office 1955–1956

Personal details
- Born: April 29, 1929 Huron, South Dakota, U.S.
- Died: March 25, 2024 (aged 94)
- Party: Republican
- Education: South Dakota State University; University of Nebraska

Theodore W. McFarling (April 29, 1929 – March 25, 2024) was an American politician. He served as a Republican member of the South Dakota House of Representatives.

== Life and career ==
McFarling was born in Huron, South Dakota. He attended South Dakota State University and the University of Nebraska.

McFarling served in the South Dakota House of Representatives from 1955 to 1956.

McFarling died on March 25, 2024, at the age of 94.
