= Eddy Braem =

Belgian goalkeeper (1943–2024)

Personal information
- Date of birth: 21 July 1943
- Place of birth: Antwerp, Belgium
- Date of death: 27 March 2024 (aged 80)
- Place of death: Burcht, Belgium
- Position: Goalkeeper

Senior career*
Years	Team	Apps	(Gls)
–1962	KVK Waaslandia Burcht		
1962–1975	Royal Antwerp		
- Koninklijke Wuustwezel Football Club

International career
	Belgium (B)	1	(0)
- * Club domestic league appearances and goals

Eddy Braem (21 July 1943 – 27 March 2024) was a Belgian footballer who played as a goalkeeper. He spent most his career with Royal Antwerp F.C., playing over 200 matches for the team, including in the Belgian Pro League and UEFA Europa League. He also played with the Belgium national football B team.

== Biography ==
Born in Antwerp, Braem started playing football with KVK Waaslandia Burcht and moved to Royal Antwerp in 1962. Initially he was the second goalkeeper behind Wim Coremans and later became the first goalkeeper of the team. Between 1962 and 1975 he played over 200 matches with the team. During his career he played one match with the Belgium national football B team and played with the military national team. After playing with Royal Antwerp he played with Koninklijke Wuustwezel Football Club. After his playing career he became trainer. He was five year the trainer of Zwijndrecht and later of K Beerschot VA.

Braem was married, had a son and grandchildren. He died on 27 March 2024, at the age of 80 in a residential care center in Burcht.
