= Raymond Uno =

Raymond Sonji Uno (December 4, 1930 – March 8, 2024) was Utah's Third District Court Judge and a civil rights activist. He was the first minority judge in Utah, serving in various judicial capacities, including as a Senior Judge of the Third District Court. Uno was a leader in the Japanese American community, having served as the president for Japanese American Citizens League and leading several other civil rights organizations.

== Early life and education ==
Uno was born on December 4, 1930, on the way to a hospital in Ogden and was named after the cab driver, Raymond Harris. His parents are both Japanese immigrants. His mother Osaka Teraoka Uno was born in Okayama Prefecture, Japan. His father, Clarence Hachiro, was born in Kanagawa Prefecture, Japan, and served in the American Expeditionary Forces in France during World War I. After Clarence became the secretary of the San Gabriel Valley Japanese Association, the Uno family moved to El Monte, California in 1938, where Uno attended Lexington School, a segregated school for Mexican, Indian, and Asian children.

During World War II, Uno's family was forcibly relocated under Executive Order 9066. They were first incarcerated in Pomona Valley Assembly located in Pomona, California, and later at the Heart Mountain Concentration Camp in Powell, Wyoming. Uno's father died in his sleep during their first year of incarceration.

In 1948, Uno moved back to Ogden, Utah, and lived with his aunt. Before enlisting in the U.S. Army, he worked briefly on the railroad. He was assigned to train at the Military Intelligence Language School in Monterey, California. Uno was later stationed in Tokyo, Japan, serving as an interpreter in the 319th Military Intelligence Service and then as a special agent in the 441st Counter Intelligence Corps, where he conducted interrogations and monitored political activities during the early Korean War. He was discharged in 1952 with the rank of corporal.

Under the GI Bill, Uno first pursued higher education at Weber Junior College, receiving an associate degree in Science before transferring to the University of Utah, where he received a Bachelor's degree in Political Science in 1955 and a Juris Doctor degree in 1958. Uno also received a secondary teaching certificate in 1959 and a master's degree in Social work in 1963. While studying for his master's degree, he worked as a caseworker for the Salt Lake County welfare department.

Uno later received an honorary doctorate in humanities from Weber State University in 1995 and an honorary doctorate from the University of Utah in 2018.

== Career ==
Uno officially began his legal career in 1963 as a referee in Utah's juvenile court. He subsequently served as Utah's deputy county attorney in 1965 and later as an assistant state attorney general. In 1969, after losing the state senate election by 150 votes, he transitioned to private legal practice, forming the law firm Madsen, Uno, and Cummings. In 1976, former Salt Lake City Mayor Ted Wilson appointed Uno to the Salt Lake Court bench, marking the beginning of his judicial career. He served as presiding judge of the Fifth Circuit Court in 1978 and was elected as a Third District Court judge in 1984. Uno retired in 1990 as a Senior Judge, though he continued hearing cases until 2003.

As a dedicated civil rights advocate, in 1970, he was elected to be the president of the Japanese Americans Citizens League (JACL), becoming the youngest individual to hold the position. During his tenure, he helped to establish JACL's past president's council and initiated the redress for the treatment of Japanese Americans at the internment camps.

In 1991, Uno co-founded and became the president of the Utah's Minority Bar Association. He has also led the National Japanese American Citizens League and the Utah Citizens Committee for Civil Rights. He also worked to preserve Japantown and Japanese culture in Salt Lake City.

== Personal life ==
Uno was married to Yoshiko Uno, with whom he had five sons. Uno also had a passion for sports, particularly basketball and tennis.

== Awards ==
- Lifetime Achievement Award, Utah Asian Chamber of Commerce (2008)
