= Peter Brodrick =

English cricketer

Personal information
- Full name: Peter Dawson Brodrick
- Born: 11 May 1937; North Shields, Northumberland
- Died: 16 March 2024 (aged 86)

Domestic team information
- Years: Team
- 1959–1961: Cambridge University
- Source: Cricinfo, 11 April 2017

Peter Dawson Brodrick (11 May 1937 – 16 March 2024) was an English cricketer. He played twenty-two first-class matches for Cambridge University Cricket Club between 1959 and 1961. He also played Minor counties cricket for Northumberland from 1956 to 1968, making 54 Minor Counties Championship appearances.

== See also ==
- List of Cambridge University Cricket Club players
