= Antônio Carlos Chamariz =

Brazilian politician (1956–2024)

Member of the Chamber of Deputies of Brazil for Alagoas
- In office 6 January 2009 – 31 December 2011
- Preceded by: Cristiano Mateus da Silva e Sousa

Personal details
- Born: Antônio Carlos Ramos Chamariz; 26 February 1956; Porto Real do Colégio, Alagoas, Brazil
- Died: 16 March 2024 (aged 68); Maceió, Alagoas, Brazil
- Political party: PTB
- Occupation: Businessman

Antônio Carlos Ramos Chamariz (26 February 1956 – 16 March 2024) was a Brazilian businessman and politician. A member of the Brazilian Labour Party, he served in the Chamber of Deputies from 2009 to 2011.

Chamariz died in Maceió on 16 March 2024, at the age of 68.
