= Paola Roldán =

Ecuadorian businesswoman (1981–2024)

- Born: Paola Roldán Espinosa; 12 April 1981; Quito, Ecuador
- Died: 11 March 2024 (aged 42)
- Occupations: Businesswoman; Philanthropist; Activist
- Children: 1

Paola Roldán Espinosa (12 April 1981 – 11 March 2024) was an Ecuadorian businesswoman and philanthropist, known for having achieved the decriminalization of euthanasia in Ecuador, after suffering from ALS.

== Biography ==
Roldán had a master's degree in international affairs from Columbia University in New York, according to Senescyt records.

On her Instagram account she defined herself as a "lover of exploring the internal and external worlds", a writer and "activist for a dignified life and death."

== Disease ==
Roldán suffered from ALS, a degenerative disease that left her bedridden, and which required constant medical care.

=== Fight for the decriminalisation of euthanasia ===
In Ecuador, a deeply religious country, Roldán opened a broad debate between those who defend life despite the pain of an incurable disease and those who believe that patients with a fatal diagnosis can make a decision about whether or not to continue their life.

At the beginning of January, Roldán responded in writing to questions from CNN through her legal team. Roldán insisted on her urgent desire to legalize euthanasia in her country.

"My particular case is pressing, given the progression of ALS and the possibility that my ability to communicate will be limited in the short term. The day I cannot express my will or am not allowed to decide when to end my life, I would stop exercising my freedom, I would lose my dignity. You cannot have a dignified life without a dignified death," Roldán emphasized to CNN.

=== Death and legacy ===
Roldán died age 42 on 11 March 2024, after almost two years of illness. Her activism inspired organizations and patients throughout Latin America.

In her final statement she asked the citizens of Ecuador for "more humility and less judgment."

"My greatest desire is to leave my son a more supportive, compassionate, loving and collaborative world. I feel that this is the best way to protect him, and I will continue trying until my last breath,"

Paola posted.

With her death and this decision, Ecuador joins other countries such as Colombia, Belgium, Luxembourg, the Netherlands, Canada, Spain, Portugal, New Zealand and five Australian states that have decriminalised euthanasia.
