= Earl Dittman =

American film critic

Earl Clifford Dittman Jr. (March 27, 1960 – March 30, 2024) was an American film critic. He was the owner of Wireless Magazines, a Houston, Texas-based company that he has said includes five pop culture publications (such as Behind the Screen and Rhythm and Groove) distributed in various markets in the United States. He was also a freelance writer, primarily for entertainment-related features.

Dittman was known for his overwhelmingly positive and heavily quoted review blurbs, especially for widely panned movies. Film and media critics have alleged that Dittman's reviews were intended to get him mentioned in international advertising and press material for movies.
