= Alex Gitterman =

Polish-born American educator (1938–2024)

- Born: March 21, 1938; Poland
- Died: March 24, 2024 (aged 86)
- Education: Rutgers University (BA); Hunter College (MSW); Teachers College, Columbia University (Ed.D)
- Occupations: professor, author, Social Work educator
- Known for: Life Model of Social Work Practice, Social Work Education
- Spouse: Naomi Pines Gitterman (m. 1963)
- Children: 2

Alex Gitterman (né Leszek, 21 March 1938 – 24 March 2024), was a Polish-born American social work educator. He was born in Poland and was a Holocaust survivor who immigrated to the United States at the age of eight. He was a professor at the University of Connecticut, School of Social Work, where he made significant contributions to both social work theory and practice. Gitterman was widely recognized for his work on the Life Model of Social Work Practice, which he co-developed and which has become a foundational framework in the field.

== Education ==
Gitterman graduated from Rutgers University with a bachelor's degree in 1960 before earning his Master of Social Work degree from Hunter College School of Social Work in 1962 and then earned his Doctor of Education Degree from Columbia University, Teachers College.

== Career ==
In 1999, he worked at the University of Connecticut, School of Social Work as a visiting professor before becoming a full professor in 2000. He taught courses in the Individuals, Groups and Families Practice in UConn for 34 years. In 2007, he was named Zachs professor and was appointed director of the Ph.D. program for eight years.

His most notable contribution was the Life Model of Social Work Practice, which he developed with Carel Germain at Columbia School of Social Work. This model emphasizes the importance of understanding individuals within their environmental contexts and has been influential in shaping modern social work practices.

Gitterman authored and co-authored numerous books, articles, and research papers that explore social work practice, group work, and the application of the Life Model in various settings.

Gitterman died in March 24, 2024, and was survived by his wife Naomi and two children.

== Publications ==
Gitterman's recent book, The Life Model of Social Work Practice: Advances in Knowledge and Practice, is used as a comprehensive framework for the field of social work. His edited text, Social Work with Vulnerable Populations is in its third edition and is widely regarded as a handbook for working with diverse populations.

In addition to his published books and articles, Gitterman shared his expertise through presentations at several other schools of social work, educational institutions and professional organizations. He was also a consultant for a number of social agencies.

== Awards and recognition ==
Gitterman’s many contributions were recognized with prestigious awards, including the Significant Lifetime Achievement in Social Work Education Award from the Council on Social Work Education.

A Lifetime Contribution Award from the International Association for the Advancement of Social Work with Groups, Inc. and a Robert Wood Johnson Exemplary Publication Award, among others. His work has influenced social work education globally, and he is regarded as one of the key figures in the development of contemporary social work theory.
