= Wiesław Kondracki =

Polish politician (1938–2024)

Member of the Sejm
- In office 18 June 1989 – 25 November 1991

Personal details
- Born: 15 October 1938 Szkopy, Poland
- Died: 5 March 2024 (aged 85)
- Party: SLD
- Education: Warsaw University of Life Sciences
- Occupation: Engineer; Farmer; Economist

Wiesław Kondracki (15 October 1938 – 5 March 2024) was a Polish engineer, farmer, economist and politician. A member of the Democratic Left Alliance, he served in the Sejm from 1989 to 1991.

Kondracki died on 5 March 2024, at the age of 85.
