= Klaus Röhl =

German politician (1933–2024)

Member of the Bundestag
- In office 20 December 1990 – 26 October 1998

Personal details
- Born: 12 November 1933 Berlin, Brandenburg, Prussia, Germany
- Died: 3 March 2024 (aged 90)
- Party: FDP
- Education: Humboldt University of Berlin; German Academy of Sciences at Berlin
- Occupation: Radiochemist

Klaus Röhl (12 November 1933 – 3 March 2024) was a German radiochemist and politician. A member of the Free Democratic Party, he served in the Bundestag from 1990 to 1998.

Röhl died on 3 March 2024, at the age of 90.
