= Andrés Miranda Hernández =

Spanish politician (1934–2024)

President of the Cabildo Insular de Tenerife
- In office 1 April 1971 – 8 January 1974
- Preceded by: José Miguel Galván Bello
- Succeeded by: Rafael Clavijo García

Member of the Cortes Españolas
- In office 6 November 1967 – 11 February 1974

Personal details
- Born: Andrés Agustín Miranda Hernández; 14 November 1934 Santa Cruz de Tenerife, Spain
- Died: 1 March 2024 (aged 89)
- Party: AP (1982–1989)
- Occupation: Pharmacist

Andrés Agustín Miranda Hernández (14 November 1934 – 1 March 2024) was a Spanish pharmacist and politician. He served as president of the Cabildo Insular de Tenerife from 1971 to 1974 and was a member of the Cortes Españolas from 1967 to 1974.

Miranda died on 1 March 2024, at the age of 89.
