= Rodney Bernstein =

Irish cricketer (1937–2024)

Cricket information
- Batting: Right-handed
- Bowling: Right-arm fast-medium

International information
- National side: Ireland

Career statistics
Competition	First-class
Matches	6
Runs scored	89
Batting average	8.90
100s/50s	0/0
Top score	18
Balls bowled	816
Wickets	16
Bowling average	25.37
5 wickets in innings	0
10 wickets in match	0
Best bowling	4/23
Catches/stumpings	1/–
- Source: CricketArchive, 6 December 2022

Rodney Elliott Bernstein (15 December 1937 – 20 March 2024) was an Irish cricketer. A right-handed batsman and right-arm fast-medium bowler, he made his debut for Ireland against the MCC in September 1960 and went on to play for them on eight occasions, his last match coming against Scotland in July 1962. All but two of his matches had first-class status.
