= François Dupuy =

- Born: 18 August 1947
- Died: 11 March 2024 (aged 76)
- Occupations: Management scholar, educator, and consultant
- Known for: Adjunct professor at INSEAD

François Dupuy (18 August 1947 – 11 March 2024) was a French management scholar, educator, and consultant, specializing in the sociology of business organizations. In 2015 he served as an adjunct professor at INSEAD and as academic director at CEDEP, the European Centre for Executive Development. He is the author of numerous books on management in both French and English. He was also a co-founder and partner of Mesa Research Group, a consulting firm specializing in leadership development.

== Early life and education ==
Dupuy graduated from the French grande école Sciences Po.

== Career ==
Dupuy joined the Centre de Recherches en Science Sociales du Travail in 1972, moving to its Centre de Sociologie des Organisations in 1976, and then to the CNRS (Centre National de la Recherche Scientifique) in 1978. In 1990 he left the CNRS to found a consulting company, Stratema-SMG France which he later sold. In 1997, he took a position as management professor at Indiana University's Kelley School of Business, which he left three years later, returning to the private sector as CEO of Mercer Consulting in France, a position he held for four years.

He also served as a visiting professor at INSEAD between 1980 and 1999, at the University of California Irvine in 1984, 1985, and 1990.

== Work ==
Dupuy has written about the reasons for failures of management in organizations. He has written about the tendency of managers to revert to outdated management techniques which have been shown to be ineffective. He also conducted case studies and analysis of management in specific organizations.

Dupuy’s later work has focused on dispersion of decision-making rights in the organization. In his 2011 book Lost in Management: La vie quotidienne des enterprises au XXIe siècle, he argues that delegation of decision rights to front-line managers and intermediaries makes it difficult to assign accountability for many decisions.

== Selected publications ==
- Le client et le bureaucrate, Dunod 1998
- Chemistry of Change, Palgrave-Macmillan 2001
- L'alchimie du changement : Problématique, étapes et mise en oeuvre, Dunod 2001
- Sharing Knowledge, Palgrave-Macmillan 2004
- La fatigue des élites: Le capitalisme et ses cadres, Seuil 2005
- Lost in Management: La vie quotidienne des enterprises au XXIe siècle, Seuil 2011
- Sociologie du changement - Pourquoi et comment changer les organisations, Dunod 2011
- Lost in Management tome 2: La faillite de la pensée managériale, Seuil 2015

Dupuy's books have received a number of awards, including the Prix Sciences Po-Le Monde Syntec du livre de ressources humaines (2004), the Prix CRC de la Chambre de Commerce de Paris (2001), and the Prix Manpower (1998).
