= Karl-Josef Jochem =

German politician (1952–2024)

Member of the Landtag of Saarland
- In office 29 September 2004 – 24 April 2012
- In office 29 October 1992 – 9 November 1994
- Preceded by: Norbert Wagner

Personal details
- Born: 29 July 1952 Illingen, Saarland
- Died: 19 March 2024 (aged 71)
- Party: FDP
- Occupation: Police officer

Karl-Josef Jochem (29 July 1952 – 19 March 2024) was a German police officer and politician. A member of the Free Democratic Party, he served in the Landtag of Saarland from 1992 to 1994 and again from 2004 to 2012.

Jochem died on 19 March 2024, at the age of 71.
