= Mary Jane Phillips =

Canadian chemical engineer

Mary Jane Phillips (1931–2024) was a Canadian chemical engineer specializing in the catalysis of hydrocarbons, the first female faculty member in chemical engineering at the University of Toronto.

== Life ==
Phillips was born in Toronto on 15 September 1931. She earned a bachelor's degree in chemical engineering at the University of Toronto in 1953. After a 1954 master's degree from Bryn Mawr College, and two years of industry work for DuPont, she went to Johns Hopkins University for doctoral study in chemistry and completed her Ph.D. there in 1960.

She was a postdoctoral researcher, first at Canada's Department of Energy, Mines and Resources (now part of Natural Resources Canada) and then in Ireland at Queen's University Belfast. Returning to Canada, she became a lecturer in chemical engineering at the University of Toronto in 1964, the department's first female faculty member. She became an assistant professor in 1972, and was tenured as an associate professor in 1977. She was promoted to full professor in 1989. She retired as professor emerita in 1997.

At Toronto, Phillips developed a course in engineering ethics, and worked to support women in engineering. Phillips became president of the Association of Professional Engineers of Ontario for 1993–1994.

She died on 18 March 2024.

== Recognition ==
Phillips was elected as a Fellow of the Chemical Institute of Canada in 1990. She became a Fellow of the American Association for the Advancement of Science, in the 2008 class of fellows, "for distinguished service to the engineering profession, and for her role as a pioneering woman in the profession and as a mentor to female engineers".
