= Margaret Ann Stamey =

American politician (1931–2024)

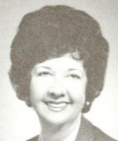
- Stamey in the 1987 legislative manual

Member of the North Carolina House of Representatives
- In office 1983–1993

Personal details
- Born: March 17, 1931 Asheville, North Carolina, U.S.
- Died: March 9, 2024 (aged 92)
- Party: Democratic
- Education: Brevard College

Margaret Ann Stamey (March 17, 1931 – March 9, 2024) was an American politician. She served as a Democratic member of the North Carolina House of Representatives.

== Life and career ==
Stamey was born in Asheville, North Carolina. She attended Plonk School of Creative Arts and Brevard College.

Stamey served in the North Carolina House of Representatives from 1983 to 1993.

Stamey died on March 9, 2024, at the age of 92.
