= Arnold L. Rheingold =

American chemist

Arnold L. Rheingold (born October 6, 1940, died March 3, 2024) was an American chemist and Professor of Chemistry at the University of California, San Diego.

== Early life ==
Rheingold was born in Chicago, Illinois on October 6, 1940. He completed his B.S. in Chemistry in 1962 and M.S. in Inorganic Chemistry in 1963 from Case Western Reserve University. From 1963 to 1965, he was a Project Manager at the Glidden Paint Company. He completed his Ph.D. in Inorganic Chemistry from the University of Maryland in 1969.

== Academic career ==
After completing his Ph.D. Rheingold became Research Associate Virginia Polytechnic Institute and State University. He also worked on the faculty of State University of New York, Plattsburgh and State University of New York, Buffalo before joining the faculty at the University of Delaware in 1981. He left Delaware in 2003 and joined the faculty at the University of California, San Diego.

== Research ==
Rheingold's fields of expertise and research interest were main-group and transition-metal organometallic chemistry, gas-phase cluster synthesis, thermoelectric materials and single-crystal structural determinations. His research explores ways of using X-ray crystallography to provide rapid and accurate structural characterizations of new compounds in collaboration with several chemists from many other departments worldwide. He is one of the most cited researchers in Chemistry in the world, having authored a record 7,665 crystal structures in the Cambridge Structural Database.
