= Eberhard Dall'Asta =

German politician (1940–2024)

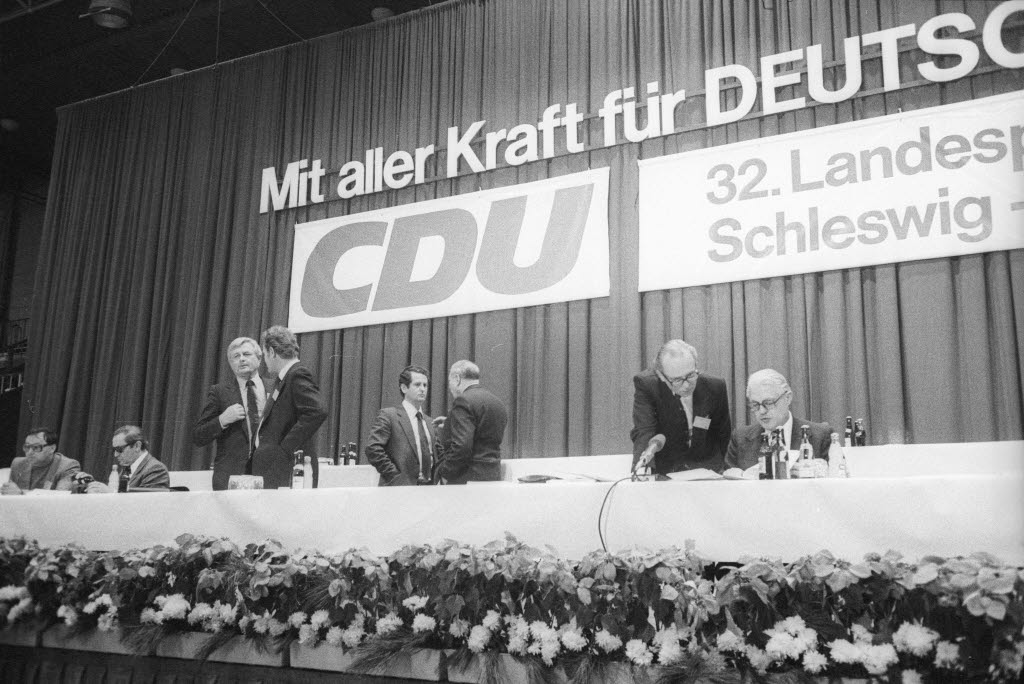
- Dall'Asta (far left) in 1979

Member of the Landtag of Schleswig-Holstein
- In office 29 May 1979 – 28 March 2000

Personal details
- Born: 3 February 1940 Berlin, Germany
- Died: 19 March 2024 (aged 84) Kiel, Schleswig-Holstein, Germany
- Party: CDU
- Education: Kiel University
- Occupation: Academic

Eberhard Dall'Asta (3 February 1940 – 19 March 2024) was a German academic and politician. A member of the Christian Democratic Union, he served in the Landtag of Schleswig-Holstein from 1979 to 2000.

Dall'Asta died in Kiel on 19 March 2024, at the age of 84.
