= Winston Register =

American politician (1935–2024)

Member of the North Dakota House of Representatives
- In office 1969–1970

Personal details
- Born: Winston Monroe Register; August 21, 1935 Bismarck, North Dakota, U.S.
- Died: March 28, 2024 (aged 88) Bradenton, Florida, U.S.
- Party: Republican
- Education: University of North Dakota

Winston Monroe Register (August 21, 1935 – March 28, 2024) was an American politician. He served as a Republican member of the North Dakota House of Representatives.

== Life and career ==
Register was born in Bismarck, North Dakota, the son of Clare and Elizabeth Register. He attended the University of North Dakota. He was a second lieutenant in the United States Army.

Register served in the North Dakota House of Representatives from 1969 to 1970.

Register died in Bradenton, Florida, on March 28, 2024, at the age of 88. His body was cremated.
