= Takanori Fukushima =

Japanese neurosurgeon (1942–2024)

- 福島 孝徳
- Born: 15 October 1942; Tokyo
- Died: 19 March 2024 (aged 81); Tokyo
- Occupation: Neurosurgeon
- Spouse: Tomomi Fukushima

Takanori Fukushima (福島 孝徳, Fukushima Takanori; 15 October 1942 – 19 March 2024) was a Japanese neurosurgeon, a prominent world authority in the treatment of brain tumors.

Fukushima graduated from Tokyo University and worked at the WakeMed Raleigh and Duke University Hospital, North Carolina. He died on 19 March 2024, at the age of 81.
