= Evelyne Sossouhounto =

Benin teacher and politician (1956–2024)

Evelyne Hortense Amélie Sossouhounto Kaneho

Minister of Primary and Secondary Education
- In office 2006–?
- President: Boni Yayi

Personal details
- Born: 2 May 1956 Abomey, French Dahomey
- Died: 29 March 2024 (aged 67) Cotonou, Benin
- Occupation: Teacher and Politician

Evelyne Hortense Amélie Sossouhounto Kaneho (2 May 1956 – 29 March 2024) was a Beninese teacher and politician.

== Biography ==
=== Early life and education ===
Evelyne Sossouhounto was born on 2 May 1956, in Abomey. A science teacher, she served as an Inspector of physical sciences, chemistry, and technology.

=== Career ===
Following the presidential election of Boni Yayi, she joined the government as the Minister of Primary and Secondary Education. Prior to this, from March to August 2006, she coordinated the project supporting the generalization of new study programs in secondary education.

From 1988 to 1998, she was the technical coordinator for pedagogical training in sciences for the United States Peace Corps volunteers. Starting in 2009, she supervised "Prime Pedagogical Workshops," aimed at designing learning situations based on a competency-based approach.

== Death ==
Sossouhounto died in Cotonou on 29 March 2024.

== Honours ==
On 8 October 2014, she was made Commander of the National Order of Benin.
