= Dahlman Davis =

American politician (1940–2024)

Member of the Missouri House of Representatives from the 122nd district
- In office 1997–2005

Personal details
- Born: August 14, 1940
- Died: March 14, 2024 (aged 83)
- Party: Democratic
- Education: Northwest Missouri State College

Dahlman Davis (August 14, 1940 – March 14, 2024) was an American politician. He served as a Democratic member for the 122nd district of the Missouri House of Representatives. Davis died on March 14, 2024, at the age of 83.
