= Tom James (Texas politician) =

American politician (1929–2024)

Member of the Texas House of Representatives
- In office January 13, 1959 – January 8, 1963

Personal details
- Born: June 7, 1929 Amarillo, Texas, U.S.
- Died: March 1, 2024 (aged 94)
- Party: Democratic
- Education: University of Texas; Southern Methodist University
- Profession: Lawyer

Tom James (June 7, 1929 – March 1, 2024) was an American politician. He served as a Democratic member in the Texas House of Representatives from 1959 to 1963.
