= Jessica Pettway =

American beauty and fashion influencer

- Born: Jessica Acie Garrett; December 30, 1987; Los Angeles, California, U.S.
- Died: March 11, 2024 (aged 36); McDonough, Georgia, U.S.
- Occupations: Beauty and fashion influencer
- Spouse: Michael Lee Pettway

YouTube information
- Channel: Jessica Pettway
- Years active: 2013–present
- Subscribers: 226 thousand
- Views: 17 million

Jessica Pettway (born Jessica Acie Garrett; December 30, 1987 – March 11, 2024) was an American beauty and fashion influencer who was best known for her videos on YouTube.

== Early life and career ==
Pettway was born in Los Angeles, California, the daughter of Willie J. Garrett and Michelle Roy. She attended and graduated from Crenshaw High School.

On November 11, 2013, Pettway created her YouTube channel, uploading her first video Meet Kai Lee, and on November 13, she uploaded the video Natural Birth Tips. Over the years, she gained popularity for her beauty and fashion videos, and she gained over 225 thousand subscribers. According to Essence, she was named a "source of inspiration" for beauty. On June 2, 2022, she posted her last video Big 70s Hair Tutorial: Styling a $60 wig. According to People, she discussed her health problems publicly, including sever bleeding.

== Personal life and death ==
In 2005, she met Michael Lee Pettway. They later married, and their marriage lasted until her death in 2024.

In February 2023, Pettway was diagnosed with stage III cervical cancer, and publicly announced her diagnosis in July 2023. She died from the disease in McDonough, Georgia on March 11, 2024, at the age of 36.
