= Mustafa Jaffer Sabodo =

Tanzanian businessman (1942–2024)

Mustafa Jaffer Sabodo (14 May 1942 – 23 March 2024) was a Tanzanian economist, consultant in international debt-finance, and businessman. He had business interests in India, France, Kenya, Sudan, Nigeria, and Zimbabwe.

== Life and career ==
Mustafa Jaffer Sabodo was born in Lindi, Tanganyika (now Tanzania) to parents of Indian descent.

In 2003, he offered to finance the growing of pulse for export to the tune of TSh 100 million.

The Mwalimu Nyerere Foundation National Lottery was the brainchild of Sabodo, who donated TSh 800 million towards a project that established the lottery.

Sabodo died in Masaki, Dar es Salaam, Tanzania on 23 March 2024, at the age of 81.
