= Aleksandr Domashev =

Soviet field hockey player (1958–2024)

Personal information
- Nationality: Soviet
- Born: 4 November 1958 Andijan, Uzbek SSR, USSR
- Died: 27 March 2024 (aged 65)

Sport
- Sport: Field hockey

Aleksandr Domashev (4 November 1958 – 27 March 2024) was a Soviet field hockey player. He competed at the 1988 Summer Olympics and the 1992 Summer Olympics. Domashev died on 27 March 2024, at the age of 65.
