= Monique Journod =

French painter and lithographer (1935–2024)

- Born: 14 March 1935; Rome, Italy
- Died: 1 March 2024 (aged 88)
- Education: Beaux-Arts de Paris
- Occupations: Painter; Lithographer

Monique Journod (14 March 1935 – 1 March 2024) was a French painter and lithographer. She lived and worked in the Cité Montmartre-aux-artistes, located at 189 Rue Ordener in Paris.

== Biography ==
Monique Journod was born in Rome on 14 March 1935. She studied at the Beaux-Arts de Paris, where she was a student of Roger Chapelain-Midy. In 1962, she was awarded the Deuxième Prix de Rome, one of France’s most prestigious prizes for young artists.

Journod was a member of the Fondation Taylor, an important French artists’ foundation, and served as president of the painters’ section of the Exhibition of French Artists. Over the course of her career, her work received praise from noted figures in the French art world, including Paul Ambille.

She was known for her distinctive painting and lithography style, contributing to exhibitions across France and internationally throughout the second half of the 20th century.

Monique Journod died on 1 March 2024, at the age of 88.

== Exhibitions ==
- Salon d'Automne (1967)
- Tehran International Exhibition Center (1974–1975)
- Hôtel de ville de Sotteville-lès-Rouen (1980)
- Salons d'honneur de l'École polytechnique (1990)
- Salon artistique de Sainte-Maure-de-Touraine (1996)
- Manoir de Briançon (2008)
- Foyer Martin-Studer (2011)
- Burnhaupt-le-Haut (2011)"Trait d'union". Magazine de la ville de Burnhaupt-le-Haut (in French). June 2011.
- Chapelle du collège Diderot (2012)
- Salon des amis des arts (2014)
- Salon Art Expo (2014)
- Salon de peintures de Condé-sur-Noireau (2014)
- Salon des amis des arts de Chaville (2016)
- Maison nationale des artistes (2022)
