= Georgy Luntovsky =

Russian banker and politician (1950–2024)

- Георгий Лунтовский
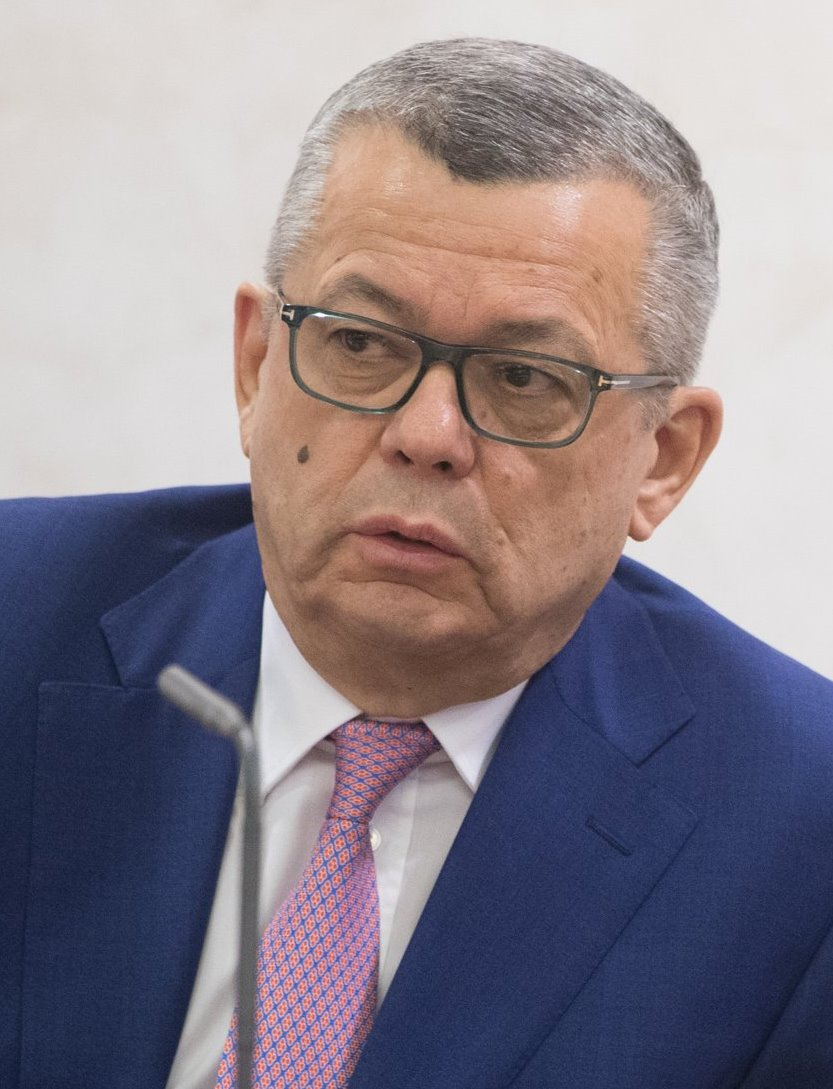
- Luntovsky in 2017

Member of the State Duma
- In office 1996–1999

Personal details
- Born: Georgy Ivanovich Luntovsky; 12 April 1950 Kursk, Russian SFSR, USSR
- Died: 10 March 2024 (aged 73) Moscow, Russia
- Party: NDR
- Education: Russian Remote Learning Financial and Economic Institute
- Occupation: Banker

Georgy Ivanovich Luntovsky (Russian: Гео́ргий Ива́нович Лунтовский; 12 April 1950 – 10 March 2024) was a Russian banker and politician. A member of Our Home – Russia, he served in the State Duma from 1996 to 1999.

Luntovsky studied in the Russian Remote Learning Financial and Economic Institute (graduated in 1978) and the Academy of National Economy (1997).

In the 1970s and 1980s, he worked on different roles in Stroibank (first in Kursk Oblast, then at the Far East. In 1985, he Voronezh to become head of construction at Voronezhvodstroi. Later, he had managerial roles in the regional departments of the State Bank of the USSR and the Construction Bank of the USSR.

In 1991, he was appointed as the chair of the private Voronezhcreitprombank. In 1992, he became the general manager of the Voronezh bank. During his time in the State Duma, Luntovsky was a member of the Parliament Committee for Budget, Taxes, Banks, and Finances. From 1999 to 2005, he was the deputy head of the Central Bank of Russia, promoted to the first deputy head of the CBR in 2005. In 2017, he retired from the Central Bank and became the head of the Association of Banks of Russia.

Luntovsky died in Moscow on 10 March 2024, at the age of 73.
