= Evan Stark =

American sociologist (1942–2024)

- Born: Evan David Stark; March 10, 1942; New York City, US
- Died: March 18, 2024 (aged 82); Woodbridge, Connecticut, US
- Spouses: Sally Connolly (divorced); Anne Flitcraft (m. 1977)
- Children: 4

Academic background
- Education: Brandeis University (BS); University of Wisconsin–Madison (MA); Binghamton University (PhD); Fordham University (MSW)

Academic work
- Discipline: Sociology
- Institutions: Quinnipiac University; Rutgers University
- Notable ideas: Coercive control

Evan David Stark (March 10, 1942 – March 18, 2024) was an American sociologist. He developed the concept of "coercive control", a type of abuse likened to kidnapping or slavery when compared to more commonly occurring abuse.

== Background ==
Stark was born in Manhattan on March 10, 1942, and grew up variously in New York City, in the boroughs of Queens and The Bronx; and in Yonkers, New York. He received his bachelor's degree in sociology from Brandeis University in 1963, and enrolled at the University of Wisconsin–Madison, where he received a master's degree and was studying for a doctorate, but his fellowship was canceled in 1967 after he organized campus protests against the Vietnam War. For a time, he lived in Ottawa, Ontario, Canada.

== Career ==
After returning to the US, he began teaching at Quinnipiac University, before earning his doctorate from Binghamton University in 1984; six years later, he also earned a master's degree in social work from Fordham University.

In 1977, Stark married Anne Flitcraft, a doctor who researched domestic abuse. They worked together in the United States and United Kingdom, and published Women at Risk: Domestic Violence and Women’s Health in 1996. He taught at Rutgers University from 1985 to 2012, and also lectured at several universities in the United Kingdom, including the University of Bristol, the University of Edinburgh, and the University of Essex. He frequently appeared as an expert witness in trials.

Stark's research focused on how abusers establish domination over their victims lives, ultimately leaving them isolated from others and dependent on their abusers; his insights are credited with widening the common understandings of domestic abuse, which previously had tended to include only physical violence. In 2007, he published Coercive Control: How Men Entrap Women in Personal Life. In his later years, he advocated for reform in domestic abuse laws; as of 2024, laws criminalizing coercive control have been passed throughout the United Kingdom, in the Republic of Ireland, the Australian state of New South Wales, the US states of Connecticut and Hawaii, and Canada.

== Personal life and death ==
Stark was married twice. His first marriage, to Sally Connolly, ended in divorce; they had one son. He and Flitcraft had three sons.

On March 18, 2024, Stark had a fatal heart attack while participating in a professional Zoom meeting at his home in Woodbridge, Connecticut. He was 82.

== Books ==
- Flitcraft, Anne; Stark, Evan (1996). Women at Risk: Domestic Violence and Women's Health. California: SAGE Publications Inc. ISBN 9780803970410.
- Stark, Evan (2024) [2007]. Coercive Control: How Men Entrap Women in Personal Life. New York: Oxford University Press. ISBN 9780195154276.
- Stark, Evan (2024). Children of Coercive Control. New York: Oxford University Press. ISBN 9780197587096.
