= Besar Nimani =

German boxer (1985–2024)

Personal information
- Nationality: German
- Born: 12 July 1985 Kosovska Mitrovica, SAP Kosovo, SR Serbia, SFR Yugoslavia
- Died: 9 March 2024 (aged 38) Bielefeld, North Rhine-Westphalia, Germany
- Height: 181 cm (5 ft 11 in)
- Weight: Light middleweight

Boxing career
- Reach: 185 cm (73 in)

Boxing record
- Total fights: 27
- Wins: 26
- Win by KO: 22
- Losses: 1

Besar Nimani (12 July 1985 – 9 March 2024) was a German professional boxer. Competing in the light middleweight division, he was the international champion and European champion of the IBF.

== Professional career ==
In 2011, Nimani turned pro and fought his first professional fight on 12 February against Thomas Freitag. Nimani was able to win the fight by knockout after just 58 seconds. He also won the following six fights by knockout. On 15 October, he was allowed to fight for the International German Championship against Hervé Mbongo-Starr. He won the fight in the Velten Ofen-Stadt-Halle - and thus his first professional title - on points after 10 rounds. On 18 November 2012, Nimani qualified for the IBF European Light Middleweight Championship after successfully fighting four fights in just under seven months. He defeated Sandor Micsko with a seventh-round knockout and won his first international title. Nimani achieved his greatest success on 31 May 2014 in Bielefeld when he brought Mike Miranda to his knees in the first round and thus became the new IBF International title holder. Nimani lost on 11 April 2015 against the French Frank Horche Horta by technical knockout in round 4. This fight was followed by longer breaks due to injuries. After a year-long break, Nimani celebrated his comeback in March 2019 with a win against Teemu Tuominen. He fought his last bout on 14 December 2019 in Hamelin against Adnan Zilic.

== Personal life and death ==
Nimani had been in the headlines several times during his boxing career. In December 2012, he was sentenced to a fine for assault. During a violent confrontation in downtown Bielefeld the following year, he was hit by two gunshots. In 2016, he was arrested for domestic violence against his wife, but was released after a short time. On 9 March 2024, Nimani was killed with several shots while leaving a hairdressing salon in downtown Bielefeld. He was 38.

During the trial of the accused, Huseyin Akkurt, who was on trial in February 2025 for the murder of Nimani, a mass shooting occurred outside the courthouse in Bielefeld, where the targets were apparently members of Nimani's family. There were four victims of the shooting, but all were in stable condition by late February. A suspect in the courthouse shooting was arrested by police.
