= André Paradis =

French writer (1939–2024)

- Born: 22 August 1939; Sivry-Courtry, France
- Died: 15 March 2024 (aged 84)
- Occupation: Writer

André Paradis (22 August 1939 – 15 March 2024) was a French writer, novelist, and essayist.

== Biography ==
Born in Sivry-Courtry on 22 August 1939, Paradis became an English teacher in his hometown after studying in Paris. In 1966, he returned to his ancestral land of French Guiana and taught English at the Lycée Félix Éboué. He then taught the language at the University of the French West Indies and Guiana from 1996 to 2002, living in Remire-Montjoly.

Paradis became a columnist for the radio station Tout Moun in 1983. On 21 December 1986, he took part in the radio show La plume à l'oreille. He appeared on the 25-minute show for 15 years.

Among his other activities, Paradis was an activist for the independence of French Guiana. In 1969 and 1976, he wrote essays in the newspaper La Jeune Garde under the pseudonym Pierre-Albert.

André Paradis died on 15 March 2024, at the age of 84.

== Works ==
- L'année du fromager (2001)
- Le soleil du fleuve (2002)
- Des hommes libres: Fragments d'une histoire (2005)
- 2028 l'affaire Jean-Mohamed Galmot (2016)

== Awards ==
- Prix Carbet des lycéens for Des hommes libres: Fragments d'une histoire (2005)
