= Vasileios Vyzas =

Greek politician (1937–2024)

Member of the Hellenic Parliament for Kozani
- In office 22 September 1996 – 11 February 2004

Personal details
- Born: Vasileios-Eumenis Konstantinou Vyzas; 24 September 1937 Emporio, Greece
- Died: 15 March 2024 (aged 86)
- Party: ND
- Education: National and Kapodistrian University of Athens
- Occupation: Physician

Vasileios-Eumenis Konstantinou Vyzas (Greek: Βασίλειος-Ευμένης Κωνσταντίνου Βύζας; 24 September 1937 – 15 March 2024) was a Greek physician and politician. A member of New Democracy, he served in the Hellenic Parliament from 1996 to 2004.

Vyzas died on 15 March 2024, at the age of 86.
