= Peter Gardiner-Hill =

English cricketer (1926–2024)

Personal information
- Full name: Peter Farquhar Gardiner-Hill
- Born: 22 October 1926; Westminster, London, England
- Died: 26 March 2024 (aged 97)
- Batting: Right-handed

Domestic team information
- Years: Team
- 1949: Oxford University

Career statistics
Competition	First-class
Matches	2
Runs scored	78
Batting average	39.00
100s/50s	–/1
Top score	50
Catches/stumpings	–/–
- Source: Cricinfo, 3 March 2020

Peter Farquhar Gardiner-Hill (22 October 1926 – 26 March 2024) was an English first-class cricketer.

The son of Harold Gardiner-Hill and Margaret Helen Buzzard, he was born at Westminster in October 1926. He was educated at Eton College, before going up to Christ Church, Oxford. While studying at Oxford, he made two appearances in first-class cricket for Oxford University against Sussex and Middlesex in 1949. He scored a half century against Middlesex. Gardiner-Hill later served as captain and president of the President's Putter. Gardiner-Hill died at home on 26 March 2024, at the age of 97.
