= Jan de Vries (footballer) =

Dutch footballer (1944–2024)

Personal information
- Date of birth: 9 February 1944
- Date of death: 19 March 2024 (aged 80)
- Place of death: Zwolle, the Netherlands
- Position: Defender

Senior career*
Years	Team	Apps	(Gls)
1960–1969	Zwolsche Boys	>88	(9)
1969–1972	PEC Zwolle	28	
- * Club domestic league appearances and goals

Jan de Vries (9 February 1944 – 19 March 2024) was a Dutch professional footballer who played as a defender. He made his debut for the main team of Zwolsche Boys at the age of 15 years old. In March 1969 he was temporarily suspended and fined. From 1969 he played with PEC Zwolle until 1972. As a tribute, a painted portrait of him is hanging at the MAC³PARK Stadion. De Vries died in Zwolle on 19 March 2014 at the age of 80.
