= Hwang Young-ha =

South Korean politician (1939–2024)

- 황영하

Minister of Government Administration
- In office 22 December 1993 – 23 December 1994
- Preceded by: Choi Chang-yun
- Succeeded by: Seo Seok-jae

Secretary General of the Board of Audit and Inspection
- In office 4 March 1993 – 22 December 1993
- Preceded by: Seong Hwan-ok
- Succeeded by: Shin Dong-jin

Personal details
- Born: 15 August 1939 Paju, Korea, Empire of Japan
- Died: 2 March 2024 (aged 84)
- Education: Seoul National University
- Occupation: Civil servant

Korean name
- Hangul: 황영하
- Hanja: 黃榮夏
- RR: Hwang Yeongha
- MR: Hwang Yŏngha

Hwang Young-ha (Korean: 황영하; 15 August 1939 – 2 March 2024) was a South Korean civil servant and politician. He served as Secretary General of the Board of Audit and Inspection from March to December 1993 and Minister of Government Administration from 1993 to 1994.

Hwang died on 2 March 2024, at the age of 84.
