= Margot Theben =

German politician (1935–2024)

Member of the Landtag of Brandenburg
- In office 1990–1999

Personal details
- Born: 10 February 1935 Rostock
- Died: 24 March 2024 (aged 89)
- Party: Party of Democratic Socialism (after 1990)
- Other party: Socialist Unity Party (1957 to 1989)

Margot Theben (10 February 1935 in Rostock – 24 March 2024 ) was a German politician from the Socialist Unity Party (SED) and later the Party of Democratic Socialism (PDS).

== Life and career ==
Theben trained as a brush maker and studied finance and budgeting at the Potsdam-Babelsberg School of Finance. From 1956 to 1958 she was employed by the Stralsund City Council and from 1958 to 1966 she worked for the Frankfurt (Oder) District Council, where she was ultimately head of the district budget. From 1967 to 1970, Theben was an aspirant and research assistant at the Berlin-Karlshorst School of Economics, where she received her doctorate in 1971.

From July 1990 to July 1991 she was an administrative employee of the district administration authority of Frankfurt/Oder. She was also a member of the advisory board of the Investment Bank of the State of Brandenburg.

== Politics ==
Theben was a member of the SED from 1957 to 1989 and of the PDS from 1990. She was a member of the finance committee of the Frankfurt (Oder) district council from 1971 to 1990 .

After the fall of the Berlin Wall and the reunification of Germany, she sat in the Landtag of Brandenburg from 1990 to 1999. Both times she was elected to parliament via the state list. She was the party's budget policy spokesperson.

Theben died in 2024. She was buried at the main cemetery in Frankfurt (Oder).
