= Karla Erbová =

Czech writer (1933–2024)

Karla Erbová (born Fremrová; pseudonym: K. Papežová; 30 April 1933 – 19 March 2024) was a Czech contemporary poet, prose writer, and journalist. Many of her writings are historical or mythological in subject matter, often including works on Ancient Greece. Born on 30 April 1933, Erbová died on 19 March 2024, at the age of 90.
