= Max Hardy =

American chef and restaurateur (1983–2024)

- Born: Maxcel Hardy; December 5, 1983; Detroit, Michigan, U.S.
- Died: March 4, 2024 (aged 40)
- Occupation(s): Chef, restaurateur

Maxcel Hardy (December 5, 1983 – March 4, 2024) was an American chef and restaurateur.

== Life and career ==
Maxcel Hardy was born in Detroit, Michigan on December 5, 1983. He moved to Florida when he was a teenager.

Hardy was a personal chef to NBA star Amar'e Stoudemire for five years.

In 2017, Hardy was ranked eighth as one of the "16 Black Chefs Changing Food in America" by The New York Times. The next year, his restaurant was ranked tenth as one of the "Best New Restaurants in Metro Detroit" by the Detroit Free Press.

Hardy died on March 4, 2024, at the age of 40.
