= Hamdi al-Sayyid =

Egyptian politician (1930–2024)

- حمدي السيد

Member of the People's Assembly

Personal details
- Born: 23 April 1930 Dekernes, Egypt
- Died: 13 March 2024 (aged 93)
- Party: National
- Education: Faculty of Medicine, Ain Shams University
- Occupation: Cardiologist

Hamdi al-Sayyid (Arabic: حمدي السيد; 23 April 1930 – 13 March 2024) was an Egyptian cardiologist and politician. A member of the National Party, he served in the People's Assembly.

Al-Sayyid died on 13 March 2024, at the age of 93.
