= Nicholas Kiefer =

American economist

Nicholas M. Kiefer
- Citizenship: United States

Academic background
- Education: Princeton University; Florida State University
- Doctoral advisor: Richard E. Quandt
- Website: Information at IDEAS / RePEc

Nicholas M. Kiefer (February 28, 1951 – March 12, 2024) was an Economics professor at Cornell University. He received a fellowship award from the John Simon Guggenheim Memorial Foundation in 1986 for his "past achievements and ... promise of future accomplishments".

Kiefer wrote graduate textbooks and monographs in econometrics, including textbooks on job-search econometrics (Empirical Labor Economics: The Search Approach with T. J. Devine and Search Models and Applied Labor Economics with G.R. Neumann). He wrote a textbook on the micro-econometrics of agents solving dynamic problems (Economic Modeling and Inference with B. J. Christensen).
