= Rati Ram =

- Born: September 10, 1934
- Died: March 23, 2024 (aged 89)

Academic background
- Education: Delhi University, University of Chicago

Academic work
- Discipline: Economics of education
- Institutions: Illinois State University, Washington State University

Rati Ram (September 10, 1934 – March 23, 2024) was an Indian-American academic who was a distinguished professor of economics at Illinois State University, Normal, Illinois, specializing in the economics of education.

Ram was born on September 10, 1934. He got his M.A. in philosophy and economics at Delhi University, and his M.A. and Ph.D. in economics at University of Chicago in 1977. From 1986 he was Distinguished Professor at Illinois State University.

Ram retired in December 2023, and died on March 23, 2024, at the age of 89.

== Selected publications ==
- Tropics and Economic Development: An Empirical Investigation. Economics Department, Illinois State University, 1996.
- Tropics and economic development: An empirical investigation. In: World Development, vol. 25, issue 9, 1997, p. 1443–452 doi:10.1016/S0305-750X(97)00044-2
- Tropics, income, and school life expectancy: an intercountry study. In: Economics of Education Review, 18, 1999, p. 253–258.
