= João da Bega =

Brazilian politician (1943–2024)

Member of the Legislative Assembly of Santa Catarina
- In office 9 February 1999 – 23 March 1999
- Preceded by: Jaime da Silva Duarte

Personal details
- Born: João Itamar da Silveira; 12 December 1943 Florianópolis, Santa Catarina, Brazil
- Died: 15 March 2024 (aged 80) Florianópolis, Santa Catarina, Brazil
- Party: PFL (1992–1998); PSDB (1998–2004)
- Occupation: Businessman

João Itamar da Silveira (12 December 1943 – 15 March 2024) was a Brazilian businessman and politician. A member of the Liberal Front Party and the Brazilian Social Democracy Party, he served in the Legislative Assembly of Santa Catarina from February to March 1999.

Da Bega died on 15 March 2024, at the age of 80.
