= Micheline Attoun =

French stage director (1936–2024)

- Born: 11 October 1936; 19th arrondissement of Paris, France
- Died: 14 March 2024 (aged 87); 14th arrondissement of Paris, France
- Occupation: Stage director

Micheline Attoun (11 October 1936 – 14 March 2024) was a French stage director.

== Biography ==
Born in the 19th arrondissement of Paris on 11 October 1936, Attoun's parents were Ashkenazi Jews of Germano-Polish origin who had moved to France in 1933. She grew up listening to her father read her Nathan the Wise by Gotthold Ephraim Lessing, instilling in her a deep love of German literature. She was separated from her husband Lucien Attoun, who she had married in 1960.

Attoun was co-director of the Théâtre Ouvert in Paris. In January 2012, Attoun was named as a Knight of the Legion of Honour.

Micheline Attoun died in the 14th arrondissement of Paris on 14 March 2024, at the age of 87.
