= Mahmoud Khalil Zakzuk =

Palestinian militant (1972–2022)

- Born: Unknown
- Died: 2024
- Conflicts: Gaza war

Mahmoud Khalil Zakzuk (? – 2024) was a Palestinian militant and senior Hamas commander.

== In Hamas ==
=== Israel–Gaza war ===
He was the deputy commander of Hamas's rocket unit in Gaza City.

== Death ==
Several Hamas operatives, including senior commander Mahmoud Khalil Zakzuk, were killed by IDF troops from the Navy's Shayetet 13 unit, the Givati Brigade's Shaked Battalion, and the Duvdevan unit after fleeing Shifa's emergency department.
