= István Lajtai =

Hungarian politician (1945–2024)

István Lajtai (13 January 1945 – 15 March 2024) was a Hungarian politician who served in the National Assembly. He died on 17 March 2024, at the age of 79.
