= Harry E. Gallagher Jr. =

American politician (1932–2024)

Member of the Missouri House of Representatives
- In office 1972–1974

Personal details
- Born: March 1, 1932 Lawrence, Kansas, U.S.
- Died: March 27, 2024 (aged 92)
- Party: Democratic
- Education: University of Kansas City

Harry E. Gallagher Jr. (March 1, 1932 – March 27, 2024) was an American politician. He served as a Democratic member of the Missouri House of Representatives from 1972 to 1974.

== Life and career ==
Harry E. Gallagher Jr. was born in Lawrence, Kansas on March 1, 1932. He attended the University of Kansas City. He worked as an insurance agent. In 1972, Gallagher was elected to the Missouri House of Representatives. Gallagher died on March 27, 2024, at the age of 92.
