= Joseph P. Manning (New Hampshire politician) =

American politician (1926–2024)

Member of the New Hampshire House of Representatives from the Cheshire 9th district
- In office 1992–2002

Member of the New Hampshire House of Representatives from the Cheshire 28th district
- In office 2002–2004

Personal details
- Born: June 5, 1926
- Died: March 28, 2024 (aged 97)
- Party: Republican

Joseph P. Manning (June 5, 1926 – March 28, 2024) was an American politician. He served as a Republican member for the Cheshire 9th and 28th district of the New Hampshire House of Representatives.

Manning died on March 28, 2024, at the age of 97.
