= Georgios Terzopoulos =

Greek politician (1931–2024)

Member of the Hellenic Parliament
- In office 18 October 1981 – 11 September 1993

Personal details
- Born: 6 February 1931 Katerini, Greece
- Died: 27 March 2024 (aged 93) Athens, Greece
- Party: Pasok
- Occupation: Farmer

Georgios Terzopoulos (Greek: Γεώργιος Τερζόπουλος; 6 February 1931 – 27 March 2024) was a Greek farmer and politician. A member of Pasok, he served in the Hellenic Parliament from 1981 to 1993.

Terzopoulos died in Athens on 27 March 2024, at the age of 93.
