= List of Guggenheim Fellowships awarded in 1973 =

Three hundred and thirty-nine scholars, artists, and scientists received Guggenheim Fellowships in 1973. $3,852,600 was disbursed between the recipients, who were chosen from an applicant pool of 2,416. Of the 112 universities represented, University of California, Berkeley and Stanford University were tied for institution with the most winners on its faculty (16). Columbia University (15) were second in fellowships, followed by University of California, Los Angeles and Yale University in third.

== United States and Canada fellows ==
Category	Field of Study	Fellow	Institutional association	Research topic	Notes	Ref
Creative Arts	Choreography	Murray Louis	Murray Louis Dance Company	Choreography	Also won in 1969	
Creative Arts	Drama and Performance Art	Frederick E. Gaines	University of Minnesota	Bull Moose, a play based on immigration in the early 1900s		
Creative Arts	Drama and Performance Art	Charles F. Gordon				
Creative Arts	Drama and Performance Art	Myrna Lamb				
Creative Arts	Drama and Performance Art	Murray Mednick	Theatre Genesis	Travel to Mexico		
Creative Arts	Drama and Performance Art	Ronald Tavel				
Creative Arts	Drama and Performance Art	Jean-Claude van Itallie			Also won in 1980	
Creative Arts	Drama and Performance Art	Joseph A. Walker	Howard University; City College of New York			
Creative Arts	Fiction	Brock Brower		Writing		
Creative Arts	Fiction	John Gardner	Southern Illinois University	Writing		
Creative Arts	Fiction	William Harrison	University of Arkansas	Writing		
Creative Arts	Fiction	Madison Jones	Auburn University	Writing		
Creative Arts	Fiction	Barton A. Midwood		Writing		
Creative Arts	Fiction	Joseph Papaleo	Sarah Lawrence College	Writing		
Creative Arts	Fiction	Gilbert Sorrentino	Sarah Lawrence College	Writing	Also won in 1987	
Creative Arts	Fiction	Richard G. Stern	University of Chicago	Writing		
Creative Arts	Fiction	Frederic Tuten	City College of New York	Writing		
Creative Arts	Fiction	Theodore Weesner	University of New Hampshire	Writing		
Creative Arts	Film	James Broughton	San Francisco Art Institute	Filmmaking	Also won in 1970	
Creative Arts	Film	Daniel Dembrosky		Filmmaking		
Creative Arts	Film	Ed Emshwiller		Filmmaking	Also won in 1978	
Creative Arts	Film	Mike Henderson	University of California, Davis	Filmmaking		
Creative Arts	Film	James Kennedy		Filmmaking		
Creative Arts	Film	Gunvor Nelson	San Francisco Art Institute	Filmmaking		
Creative Arts	Film	David Loeb Weiss		Filmmaking		
Creative Arts	Fine Arts	Ilya Bolotowsky	Southampton College	2D and 3D painting		
Creative Arts	Fine Arts	Frank Bowling		Painting	Also won in 1967	
Creative Arts	Fine Arts	Marvin Brown	California State University			
Creative Arts	Fine Arts	Lowry Burgess	Massachusetts College of Art			
Creative Arts	Fine Arts	David Diao	Whitney Museum Independent Study Program	Painting		
Creative Arts	Fine Arts	Mary Frank		Graphics	Also won in 1983	
Creative Arts	Fine Arts	Hans Haacke	Cooper Union			
Creative Arts	Fine Arts	Michael D. Hall	Cranbrook Academy of Art	Sculpture		
Creative Arts	Fine Arts	Frederick Hammersley	University of New Mexico	Painting		
Creative Arts	Fine Arts	Bernard Edwin Kirschenbaum		Sculpture		
Creative Arts	Fine Arts	Boyd Mefferd				
Creative Arts	Fine Arts	Forrest Myers		Sculpture		
Creative Arts	Fine Arts	Matthew Phillips	Bard College	Graphics		
Creative Arts	Fine Arts	Basilios Poulos		Painting		
Creative Arts	Fine Arts	Robert Ryman		Painting		
Creative Arts	Fine Arts	Alan J. Shields		Painting		
Creative Arts	Fine Arts	Robert I. Smithson		Sculpture: Amarillo Ramp		
Creative Arts	Fine Arts	Jack Sonenberg	Pratt Institute	Painting		
Creative Arts	Fine Arts	Chryssa Vardea-Mavromichali		Sculpture		
Creative Arts	Music Composition	Walter E. Aschaffenburg	Oberlin Conservatory of Music	Composing	Also won in 1955	
Creative Arts	Music Composition	Leslie Bassett	University of Michigan	Composing	Also won in 1980	
Creative Arts	Music Composition	George H. Crumb	University of Pennsylvania	Composing	Also won in 1967	
Creative Arts	Music Composition	Edwin Dugger	University of California, Berkeley	Composing		
Creative Arts	Music Composition	Donald Martino	New England Conservatory of Music	Composing	Also won in 1967, 1982	
Creative Arts	Music Composition	Pauline Oliveros	University of California, San Diego	Studied myth and ritual group interaction		
Creative Arts	Music Composition	Vincent Persichetti	Juilliard School; Philadelphia Conservatory	Composing	Also won in 1958, 1968	
Creative Arts	Music Composition	Robert Pollock		Composing		
Creative Arts	Music Composition	Harvey Sollberger	Columbia University; Manhattan School of Music	Composing	Also won in 1969	
Creative Arts	Music Composition	Louis Weingarden		Composing		
Creative Arts	Photography	Robert Hickman Adams		Colorado homes in the 1970s	Also won in 1980	
Creative Arts	Photography	Bill Dane			Also won in 1982	
Creative Arts	Photography	Wendy Snyder MacNeil	Abbot Academy; Phillips Academy	Long-term documentary experiment		
Creative Arts	Photography	Sonia Landy Sheridan	School of the Art Institute of Chicago			
Creative Arts	Photography	George A. Tice	New School for Social Research	New Jersey city, suburban, shore, and rural areas		
Creative Arts	Photography	John Vachon		American towns rural enough to have maintained an identity		
Creative Arts	Photography	David Vestal	School of the Art Institute of Chicago (visiting)		Also won in 1966	
Creative Arts	Poetry	John Ashbery	Brooklyn College	Writing	Also won in 1967	
Creative Arts	Poetry	Irving Feldman	State University of New York at Buffalo	Writing		
Creative Arts	Poetry	David Ignatow	Columbia University	Writing	Also won in 1965	
Creative Arts	Poetry	X. J. Kennedy	Tufts University	Writing		
Creative Arts	Poetry	Philip Levine	Fresno State University	Writing	Also won in 1980	
Creative Arts	Poetry	Michael McClure	California College of Arts and Crafts	Writing		
Creative Arts	Poetry	W. S. Merwin		Writing	Also won in 1983	
Creative Arts	Poetry	Stanley Plumly	Ohio University	Writing		
Creative Arts	Poetry	James Scully	University of Connecticut	Writing		
Creative Arts	Video and Audio	Joel L. Gold				
Humanities	American Literature	Morris Dickstein	Queens College, CUNY			
Humanities	American Literature	Burton R. Pollin	Bronx Community College	Edgar Allan Poe’s style, including his coinages; his response to the arts and artists of the day; relation to the music of his time; his reviewers; and his necrology		
Humanities	American Literature	Robert F. Sayre	University of Iowa	Thoreau's Indian Notebooks		
Humanities	American Literature	John D. Seelye	University of Connecticut			
Humanities	American Literature	Emily Stipes Watts	University of Illinois	Critical and historical study of women poets in America		
Humanities	Architecture, Planning and Design	William Alonso	University of California, Berkeley	Comparative studies on urbanization		
Humanities	Architecture, Planning and Design	H. Allen Brooks	University of Toronto	Le Corbusier		
Humanities	Architecture, Planning and Design	Grady E. Clay	Landscape Architecture	Analysis of urban growth		
Humanities	Biography	Brendan Gill				
Humanities	Biography	Ronald Steel	Yale University			
Humanities	British History	Stephen B. Baxter	University of North Carolina	History of Britain and Hanover, 1739-1763	Also won in 1959	
Humanities	British History	Karl S. Bottigheimer	State University of New York at Stony Brook	Failure of the Reformation in 16th-century Ireland		
Humanities	British History	John S. Galbraith	University of California, Los Angeles			
Humanities	British History	Bentley B. Gilbert	University of Illinois at Chicago			
Humanities	British History	Peter Stansky	Stanford University	Art, society, and politics in England, 1890s	Also won in 1966	
Humanities	British History	Robert K. Webb	Columbia University		Also won in 1959	
Humanities	Classics	D. A. Amyx	University of California, Berkeley	Corinthian vase-painting	Also won in 1957	
Humanities	Classics	Eva C. Keuls	University of Minnesota; Howard University			
Humanities	Classics	Brooks Otis	University of North Carolina	Transcendence of tragedy	Also won in 1952	
Humanities	East Asian Studies	A. K. Narain	University of Wisconsin, Madison	Kushans of Central and South Asia during the first three centuries A.D.		
Humanities	East Asian Studies	Oliver H. Statler		Religious customs in Japan		
Humanities	East Asian Studies	Frederic Evans Wakeman	University of California, Berkeley	Ming loyalism in Ch'ing China		
Humanities	Economic History	Hugh G. J. Aitken	Amherst College	Historical development of radio communications in Europe and the United States		
Humanities	Economic History	Stuart W. Bruchey	Columbia University			
Humanities	Economic History	Bernt P. Stigum	Northwestern University			
Humanities	English Literature	Stuart Curran	University of Wisconsin, Madison	Literary relationship between Byron and Shelley		
Humanities	English Literature	Carl Dawson	University of New Hampshire	Matthew Arnold		
Humanities	English Literature	Anne D. Ferry	Boston College			
Humanities	English Literature	Roland M. Frye	University of Pennsylvania	John Milton's epic poetry and the visual arts	Also won in 1956	
Humanities	English Literature	James R. Kincaid	Ohio State University		Also won in 1982	
Humanities	English Literature	Russell A. Fraser	University of Michigan	Kinship of the mage and scientist in the Middle Ages and the Renaissance		
Humanities	English Literature	George Paul Landow	Brown University		Also won in 1978	
Humanities	English Literature	Thomas A. McFarland	Graduate Center, CUNY		Also won in 1964	
Humanities	English Literature	William H. Pritchard	Amherst College			
Humanities	English Literature	Mark Schorer	University of California, Berkeley	George Balanchine	Also won in 1941, 1942, 1948	
Humanities	English Literature	Marvin Spevack	University of Münster			
Humanities	English Literature	Jane W. Stedman	Roosevelt University	Research at the University of London		
Humanities	English Literature	Kathleen Mary Williams	University of California, Riverside	Literature of the 18th century and the Renaissance in libraries in the United States and England		
Humanities	Fine Arts Research	James Beck	Columbia University	Critical monograph on Jacopo della Quercia		
Humanities	Fine Arts Research	Jack Wesley Burnham, Jr.	Northwestern University	Alchemical symbolism in the works of Marcel Duchamp		
Humanities	Fine Arts Research	Michael Martin Fried	Harvard University			
Humanities	Fine Arts Research	Reinhold A. Heller	University of Pittsburgh			
Humanities	Fine Arts Research	Michael Sullivan	Stanford University	Chinese landscape paintings and the Sui and Tang dynasties		
Humanities	Fine Arts Research	John Wilmerding	Dartmouth College	American art (part of the Pelican History of Art series)		
Humanities	Folklore and Popular Culture	Ilhan Basgöz	Indiana University	Comparative study of the romantic epics of the Turkic peoples		
Humanities	French History	Robert R. Palmer	Yale University	French education during the revolutionary era, 1760-1820		
Humanities	French History	Peter N. Stearns	Rutgers University	Attitudes and policies toward aging in France since 1850		
Humanities	French Literature	Peter Brooks	Yale University			
Humanities	French Literature	Shoshana Felman	Yale University			
Humanities	French Literature	John C. Lapp	Stanford University	Pierre Corneille	Also won in 1966	
Humanities	General Nonfiction	Renata Adler	The New Yorker			
Humanities	General Nonfiction	Walter Goodman				
Humanities	General Nonfiction	Neil Sheehan	New York Times			
Humanities	German and East European History	Gerald D. Feldman	University of California, Berkeley	Socio-economic history of the early Weimar Republic		
Humanities	German and East European History	Hsi-Huey Liang	Vassar College			
Humanities	German and Scandinavian Literature	Klaus W. Jonas	University of Pittsburgh			
Humanities	Latin American History	Charles Adam Hale	University of Iowa	Interpretive history of Mexican thought and the politics in the period 1867-1910		
Humanities	Linguistics	Eric P. Hamp	University of Chicago	Albanian dialectology		
Humanities	Linguistics	David McNeill	University of Chicago	Psychology of language		
Humanities	Linguistics	Stanley Peters	University of Texas, Austin	Semantics of natural languages		
Humanities	Literary Criticism	Merle E. Brown	University of Iowa	Contemporary British poetry and literary criticism		
Humanities	Literary Criticism	Laura Riding Jackson				
Humanities	Literary Criticism	Rosette C. Lamont	Queens College, CUNY			
Humanities	Literary Criticism	Edgar Rosenberg	Cornell University			
Humanities	Literary Criticism	Michael Wood	Columbia University			
Humanities	Medieval History	Donald W. Sutherland	University of Iowa	Edition of medieval law proceedings held in the Royal Court in Northamptonshire, 1329-1330		
Humanities	Medieval Literature	Marvin L. Colker	University of Virginia	Descriptive catalog of Latin manuscripts at the University of Dublin		
Humanities	Medieval Literature	Andrew Hughes	University of Toronto	Investigation and photographing of medieval manuscripts in Europe		
Humanities	Music Research	Stuart Reiner				
Humanities	Music Research	Charles Rosen	State University of New York at Stony Brook	Relationship of Romantic music and 19th-century theories of language and style		
Humanities	Music Research	Cecil P. Taylor	Antioch College (visiting)	Black music composition		
Humanities	Near Eastern Studies	L. Carl Brown	Princeton University			
Humanities	Philosophy	Donald Davidson	Rockefeller University	Philosophy of language		
Humanities	Philosophy	David Shepherd Nivison	Stanford University	Weakness of will in Chinese philosophy		
Humanities	Philosophy	Richard M. Rorty	Stanford University			
Humanities	Philosophy	Peter Kenneth Unger	New York University			
Humanities	Philosophy	Roger Wertheimer	Graduate Center, CUNY			
Humanities	Photography Studies	Eugenia Parry Janis	Wellesley College	Life of Gustave Le Gray		
Humanities	Religion	Charley D. Hardwick	American University	Psychoanalysis theory		
Humanities	Religion	H. Darrell Lance	Colgate Rochester Divinity School	Write-up of excavations at Gezer		
Humanities	Religion	Jacob Neusner	Brown University		Also won in 1979	
Humanities	Renaissance History	Hans Baron	Newberry Library	Florentine humanism and historiography of Leonardo Bruni	Also won in 1942	
Humanities	Renaissance History	F. Edward Cranz	Connecticut College	Medieval and Renaissance intellectual history and bibliography		
Humanities	Renaissance History	John M. Headley	University of North Carolina	Critical edition of the autobiography of Mercurino di Gattinara		
Humanities	Russian History	Gustave Alef	University of Oregon	History of medieval Russia		
Humanities	Russian History	Richard Hellie	University of Chicago			
Humanities	Spanish and Portuguese Literature	Alexander A. Parker	University of Texas, Austin	Art and thought of Pedro Calderón de la Barca		
Humanities	Spanish and Portuguese Literature	Allen W. Phillips	University of Texas, Austin	Life and time of Alejandro Sawa	Also won in 1960	
Humanities	Spanish and Portuguese Literature	John Polt	University of California, Berkeley	Critical edition of the poetry of Juan Meléndez Valdés		
Humanities	Spanish and Portuguese Literature	Kenneth R. Scholberg	Michigan State University	Satire in 16th-century Spanish literature		
Humanities	Theatre Arts	Reginald Allen	Pierpont Morgan Library			
Humanities	Theatre Arts	Gordon Rogoff	SUNY Buffalo			
Humanities	United States History	Paul S. Boyer	University of Massachusetts			
Humanities	United States History	David B. Burner	State University of New York at Stony Brook	Biography of Herbert Hoover		
Humanities	United States History	Edward M. Coffman	University of Wisconsin–Madison	Social history of the peacetime American Army, 1783-1940		
Humanities	United States History	Robert Dallek	University of California, Los Angeles			
Humanities	United States History	Robert F. Dalzell	Williams College	General history of Massachusetts, 1829-1861		
Humanities	United States History	Robert M. Fogelson	Massachusetts Institute of Technology			
Humanities	United States History	John Hope Franklin	University of Chicago		Also won in 1950	
Humanities	United States History	Lloyd C. Gardner	Rutgers College	Anglo-American political and economic relations in the 20th century, with emphasis on cooperation and conflict in situations such as the Russian and Mexican Revolutions		
Humanities	United States History	Charles Lockwood				
Humanities	United States History	David P. Thelen	University of Missouri, Columbia	Industrial capitalism in England and America		
Humanities	United States History	Alden T. Vaughan	Columbia University			
Humanities	United States History	James Edward Wright	Dartmouth College			
Natural Sciences	Applied Mathematics	Leopold B. Felsen	Polytechnic Institute of Brooklyn			
Natural Sciences	Applied Mathematics	Carl H. Gibson	University of California, San Diego	Turbulence		
Natural Sciences	Applied Mathematics	Morton E. Gurtin	Carnegie Mellon University	Continuum mechanics		
Natural Sciences	Applied Mathematics	Nicholas A. Krall	University of Maryland			
Natural Sciences	Applied Mathematics	John L. Lumley	Pennsylvania State University	Oceanic turbulence		
Natural Sciences	Applied Mathematics	J. Nicholas Newman	Massachusetts Institute of Technology			
Natural Sciences	Applied Mathematics	Malvin C. Teich	Columbia University			
Natural Sciences	Astronomy and Astrophysics	Gordon P. Garmire	California Institute of Technology	Research in Australia, India, England, and France		
Natural Sciences	Astronomy and Astrophysics	William L. Kraushaar	University of Wisconsin, Madison	High-energy astrophysics	Also won in 1962	
Natural Sciences	Astronomy and Astrophysics	Laurence E. Peterson	University of California, San Diego	High-energy astronomy		
Natural Sciences	Chemistry	Evan H. Appelman	Argonne National Laboratory			
Natural Sciences	Chemistry	Charles R. Cantor	Columbia University			
Natural Sciences	Chemistry	William R. Dolbier Jr.	University of Florida			
Natural Sciences	Chemistry	Russell Stephen Drago	University of Illinois	Synthetic inorganic chemistry and catalysis		
Natural Sciences	Chemistry	Adon A. Gordus	University of Michigan			
Natural Sciences	Chemistry	David M. Hercules	University of Georgia	Research at Northwestern University		
Natural Sciences	Chemistry	John R. Huizenga	University of Rochester	Research at Lawrence Berkeley National Laboratory	Also won in 1964	
Natural Sciences	Chemistry	Lloyd M. Jackman	Pennsylvania State University			
Natural Sciences	Chemistry	Julian M. Miller	Columbia University			
Natural Sciences	Chemistry	Warner L. Peticolas	University of Oregon	Molecular vibrations in solid material		
Natural Sciences	Chemistry	John O. Rasmussen Jr.	Yale University			
Natural Sciences	Chemistry	Louis P. Remsberg, Jr	Brookhaven National Laboratory	High nuclear chemistry		
Natural Sciences	Chemistry	F. Sherwood Rowland	University of California, Irvine		Also won in 1961	
Natural Sciences	Chemistry	John R. Scheffer	University of British Columbia	Photochemistry		
Natural Sciences	Chemistry	Kenneth L. Servis	University of Southern California	Physical organic chemistry		
Natural Sciences	Chemistry	Eugene E. van Tamelen	Stanford University	Ribonucleic acid synthesis	Also won in 1964	
Natural Sciences	Chemistry	Nien-chu C. Yang	University of Chicago			
Natural Sciences	Computer Science	Waldo G. Magnuson Jr.	Lawrence Livermore Laboratory			
Natural Sciences	Computer Science	John E. Savage	Brown University			
Natural Sciences	Earth Science	Edward Anders	University of Chicago			
Natural Sciences	Earth Science	David J. J. Kinsman	Princeton University			
Natural Sciences	Earth Science	John Rodgers	Yale University			
Natural Sciences	Earth Science	J. William Schopf	University of California, Los Angeles		Also won in 1988	
Natural Sciences	Earth Science	Manik Talwani	Columbia University	Evolution of the Norwegian Sea and the off-shore continental margin there		
Natural Sciences	Engineering	Richard de Neufville	Massachusetts Institute of Technology			
Natural Sciences	Engineering	W. Harmon Ray	SUNY Buffalo			
Natural Sciences	Mathematics	Stephen Lichtenbaum	Cornell University			
Natural Sciences	Mathematics	Ted Petrie	Rutgers University			
Natural Sciences	Mathematics	Ralph S. Phillips	Stanford University	Mathematical analysis	Also won in 1953	
Natural Sciences	Mathematics	Daniel G. Quillen	Massachusetts Institute of Technology			
Natural Sciences	Mathematics	Halsey Royden	Stanford University	Xomplex analysis and differential geometry		
Natural Sciences	Mathematics	Wilfried Schmid	Columbia University		Also won in 1988	
Natural Sciences	Mathematics	James Johnston Stoker	New York University		Also won in 1964	
Natural Sciences	Mathematics	Masamichi Takesaki	University of California, Los Angeles			
Natural Sciences	Mathematics	Herbert S. Wilf	University of Pennsylvania	Combinatorial analysis		
Natural Sciences	Medicine and Health	John P. Bunker	Stanford University	Surgical and medical manpower		
Natural Sciences	Medicine and Health	Charles J. Epstein	University of California, San Francisco	Developmental genetics and oncology		
Natural Sciences	Medicine and Health	Richard A. Gatti	University of Minnesota			
Natural Sciences	Medicine and Health	Stephen M. Krane	Harvard University			
Natural Sciences	Medicine and Health	Norman Kretchmer	Stanford University	Human development and reproductive physiology		
Natural Sciences	Medicine and Health	William Silen	Harvard University			
Natural Sciences	Medicine and Health	David Hamilton Smith	Harvard University			
Natural Sciences	Medicine and Health	Paul Talalay	Johns Hopkins University School of Medicine	Research with John Cornforth		
Natural Sciences	Medicine and Health	Gerald Weissmann	New York University Medical Center	Research at Sorbonne University		
Natural Sciences	Molecular and Cellular Biology	James J. Castles	University of Chicago School of Medicine			
Natural Sciences	Molecular and Cellular Biology	Roderick Clayton	Cornell University		Also won in 1980	
Natural Sciences	Molecular and Cellular Biology	R. John Collier	University of California, Los Angeles			
Natural Sciences	Molecular and Cellular Biology	Robert J. DeLange	University of California, Los Angeles School of Medicine			
Natural Sciences	Molecular and Cellular Biology	Howard M. Dintzis	Johns Hopkins University			
Natural Sciences	Molecular and Cellular Biology	Robert C. Elston	University of North Carolina	Analytical methods in human genetics		
Natural Sciences	Molecular and Cellular Biology	James L. Gaylor	Cornell University			
Natural Sciences	Molecular and Cellular Biology	Ian R. Gibbons	University of Hawaii	Biophysics and cell biology		
Natural Sciences	Molecular and Cellular Biology	Lawrence Grossman	Brandeis University			
Natural Sciences	Molecular and Cellular Biology	William Platt Jencks	Brandeis University			
Natural Sciences	Molecular and Cellular Biology	Leo Nicholas Ornston	Yale University			
Natural Sciences	Molecular and Cellular Biology	William Trager	Rockefeller University			
Natural Sciences	Molecular and Cellular Biology	Kensal E. van Holde	Oregon State University	Biophysical chemistry		
Natural Sciences	Molecular and Cellular Biology	Peter Hans von Hippel	University of Oregon	Proteins and genes		
Natural Sciences	Neuroscience	Jeffrey M. Camhi	Cornell University	Patterns in nerve cell activity		
Natural Sciences	Neuroscience	Gary C. Galbraith	University of Southern California	Ways in which aging affects the human nervous system		
Natural Sciences	Neuroscience	Michael L. Shelanski	National Heart and Lung Institute			
Natural Sciences	Organismic Biology and Ecology	William L. Brown, Jr.	Cornell University			
Natural Sciences	Organismic Biology and Ecology	Alan Gelperin	Princeton University			
Natural Sciences	Organismic Biology and Ecology	Robert Rush Miller	University of Michigan	Freshwater fish in Mexico		
Natural Sciences	Organismic Biology and Ecology	Nicholas Mrosovsky	University of Toronto			
Natural Sciences	Organismic Biology and Ecology	Gordon H. Orians	University of Washington	Melodious blackbird		
Natural Sciences	Organismic Biology and Ecology	Michael E. Soulé	University of California, San Diego	Population genetics and evolutionary biology		
Natural Sciences	Plant Science	Winslow Briggs	Harvard University	Research at University of Freiburg		
Natural Sciences	Plant Science	Sherwin Carlquist	Claremont Graduate University	Pittosporaceae		
Natural Sciences	Plant Science	Paul A. Castelfranco	University of California, Davis			
Natural Sciences	Plant Science	Maarten Chrispeels	University of California, San Diego	Structural and functional changes in cells during development		
Natural Sciences	Plant Science	R. James Cook	Washington State University	Soil microbiology and biological control of plant pathogens		
Natural Sciences	Plant Science	Park S. Nobel	University of California, Los Angeles			
Natural Sciences	Plant Science	Arthur H. Westing	Windham College	Environmental damage caused by war		
Natural Sciences	Plant Science	Jan A. D. Zeevaart	Michigan State University			
Natural Sciences	Physics	James Bjorken	Stanford University	Theoretical studies in high-energy physics		
Natural Sciences	Physics	Henry Blosser	Michigan State University			
Natural Sciences	Physics	Paul G. Federbush	University of Michigan			
Natural Sciences	Physics	Gerald Feinberg	Columbia University			
Natural Sciences	Physics	Daniel Z. Freedman	State University of New York at Stony Brook	High-energy physics	Also won in 1985	
Natural Sciences	Physics	Melville S. Green	Temple University	Statistical mechanics	Also won in 1957	
Natural Sciences	Physics	Paul V. C. Hough	Brookhaven National Laboratory	Molecular biology	Also won in 1959	
Natural Sciences	Physics	Vincent Jaccarino	University of California, Santa Barbara	Solid-state physics		
Natural Sciences	Physics	Robert Karplus	University of California, Berkeley	Logical mathematical thinking among different populations of elementary and secondary school students	Also won in 1960	
Natural Sciences	Physics	Toichiro Kinoshita	Cornell University			
Natural Sciences	Physics	Margaret Galland Kivelson	University of California, Los Angeles	Research with James Dungey		
Natural Sciences	Physics	Raymond L. Orbach	University of California, Los Angeles	Research at Tel Aviv University		
Natural Sciences	Physics	Wolfgang K. H. Panofsky	Stanford University	High-energy physics	Also won in 1959	
Natural Sciences	Physics	Robert O. Pohl	Cornell University			
Natural Sciences	Physics	Paul L. Richards	University of California, Berkeley	Solid-state physics		
Natural Sciences	Physics	Robert H. Silsbee	Cornell University			
Natural Sciences	Physics	Harold K. Ticho	University of California, Los Angeles		Also won in 1966	
Natural Sciences	Physics	George H. Trilling	University of California, Berkeley	Research at CERN		
Natural Sciences	Physics	Stanley George Wojcicki	Stanford University	High-energy physics		
Natural Sciences	Physics	Lincoln Wolfenstein	Carnegie Mellon University	Theoretical research in high-energy physics	Also won in 1983	
Social Sciences	Anthropology and Cultural Studies	Richard N. Adams	University of Texas at Austin	Structural history of Latin America, 1500-1970		
Social Sciences	Anthropology and Cultural Studies	Harold C. Conklin	Yale University			
Social Sciences	Anthropology and Cultural Studies	Arthur G. Miller	Yale University			
Social Sciences	Anthropology and Cultural Studies	Joan Eveline Vincent	Barnard College	Ongoing political conflict in Northern Ireland		
Social Sciences	Economics	George A. Akerlof	University of California, Berkeley	Development policy		
Social Sciences	Economics	Joseph S. Berliner	Brandeis University			
Social Sciences	Economics	Mary Jean Bowman	University of Chicago			
Social Sciences	Economics	Donald J. Brown	Yale University	Arrow's Theorem		
Social Sciences	Economics	Lawrence J. Lau	Stanford University	Theoretical and empirical investigations in econometrics		
Social Sciences	Economics	Lionel W. McKenzie	University of Rochester			
Social Sciences	Economics	Deborah Duff Milenkovitch	Barnard College			
Social Sciences	Education	Alan Peshkin	University of Illinois	Role of schooling in the rural community		
Social Sciences	Geography and Environmental Studies	Harold C. Brookfield	McGill University	Research at the Institute of Development Studies		
Social Sciences	Law	Thomas M. Franck	New York University		Also won in 1982	
Social Sciences	Law	Mason Willrich	University of Virginia School of Law	Legal restraints on energy use		
Social Sciences	Political Science	Frederick C. Barghoorn	Yale University			
Social Sciences	Political Science	Alfred Diamant	Indiana University	Political role of the West German government's senior bureaucracy		
Social Sciences	Political Science	Peter J. Duignan	Stanford University	Comparative analysis of European imperial rule in Africa, 1880-1960		
Social Sciences	Political Science	Lewis J. Edinger	Columbia University	Comparative political leadership		
Social Sciences	Political Science	George J. Graham Jr.	Vanderbilt University	Consensus in political theory		
Social Sciences	Political Science	A. James Gregor	University of California, Berkeley	Nature of fascism as a political system		
Social Sciences	Political Science	Ernst B. Haas	University of California, Berkeley	Effect of technological innovation on the evolution of international systems		
Social Sciences	Political Science	Chalmers Johnson	University of California, Berkeley	Political history of the Japanese Ministry of International Trade and Industry, 1949-1969		
Social Sciences	Political Science	Ellen Mickiewicz	Michigan State University			
Social Sciences	Political Science	Walter F. Murphy	Princeton University			
Social Sciences	Political Science	Andrew J. Nathan	Columbia University			
Social Sciences	Political Science	Frances Fox Piven	Boston University			
Social Sciences	Political Science	Richard Rose	University of Strathclyde	Evolution of public policy in the European state		
Social Sciences	Political Science	Richard N. Rosecrance	Cornell University			
Social Sciences	Political Science	Steven L. Spiegel	University of California, Los Angeles	Domestic determinants of American policy in the Middle East		
Social Sciences	Psychology	A. H. Black	McMaster University	Autonomic and central nervous system		
Social Sciences	Psychology	Peter D. Eimas	Brown University	Problems of speech perception		
Social Sciences	Psychology	Jean-Claude Falmagne	New York University			
Social Sciences	Psychology	Rochel Gelman	University of Pennsylvania	Development of number concepts		
Social Sciences	Psychology	David M. Green	University of California, San Diego	Application of linear analysis to auditory phenomena		
Social Sciences	Psychology	James G. Greeno	University of Michigan	Research at Oxford University		
Social Sciences	Psychology	Irving Lester Janis	Yale University			
Social Sciences	Psychology	James M. Jones	Harvard University	Calypso humor		
Social Sciences	Psychology	P. Herbert Leiderman	Stanford University	Familial influence on African infant precocity		
Social Sciences	Psychology	Dominic W. Massaro	University of Wisconsin, Madison	Theoretical study of speech perception and reading		
Social Sciences	Psychology	Robert Rosenthal	Harvard University			
Social Sciences	Psychology	Carl E. Thoresen	Stanford University	Concepts and concerns of humanistic psychology and education, behavior principles, and techniques		
Social Sciences	Psychology	Michael T. Turvey	University of Connecticut	Research at the University of Essex		
Social Sciences	Sociology	Ivar E. Berg	Columbia University			
Social Sciences	Sociology	Paul Bouissac	University of Toronto			
Social Sciences	Sociology	Joseph Robert Gusfield	University of California, San Diego	Knowledge and policy in alcohol and public safety		
Social Sciences	Sociology	Richard J. Ofshe	University of California, Berkeley	Sociology of utopian social designs		
Social Sciences	Sociology	Neil J. Smelser	University of California, Berkeley			
Social Sciences	Sociology	Richard Sennett	New York University			
Social Sciences	Sociology	Seymour Spilerman	University of Wisconsin, Madison	Ethnicity, stratification, and poverty in Israel		
Social Sciences	Sociology	Harrison Colyar White	Harvard University			

== Latin American and Caribbean Fellows ==
Category	Field of Study	Fellow	Institutional association	Research topic	Notes	Ref
Creative Arts	Drama and Performance Arts	Barry Reckord		Playwrighting		
Creative Arts	Fiction	Antonio Di Benedetto		Writing		
Creative Arts	Fiction	José Donoso		Writing	Also won in 1968	
Creative Arts	Fiction	Salvador Elizondo	National Autonomous University of Mexico	Writing	Also won in 1968	
Creative Arts	Fiction	Héctor Manjarrez		Writing		
Creative Arts	Fine Arts	Olga de Amaral	University of the Andes	Techniques and creative work in the weaving of textiles		
Creative Arts	Fine Arts	Gunther Gerzso		Painting and graphics		
Creative Arts	Fine Arts	Avatar da Silva Moraes	Universidade de Brasília	Sculpture		
Creative Arts	Poetry	Isabel Fraire	Universidad Nacional Autónoma de México	Writing		
Humanities	Architecture, Planning and Design	Silvio Grichener		Participation in planning and design by occupants of low-cost housing projects		
Humanities	Architecture, Planning and Design	Ramón Gutiérrez	National University of the Northeast	Analytical history of colonial architecture of Argentina, Paraguay, Uruguay, and Bolivia		
Humanities	Iberian and Latin American History	Alvaro Jara	University of Chile	Economic history of Latin America		
Humanities	Latin American Literature	Mario Góngora del Campo	University of Chile	Place of America in historical thought from the 16th to 18th centuries		
Humanities	Latin American Literature	Julio Ortega		Historical and critical study of the avant-garde Latin American novel		
Humanities	Theatre Arts	Augusto Boal	Teatro de La Ranchería	Latin American popular theatre	Also won in 1975	
Natural Sciences	Earth Sciences	Zoltan de Cserna	Universidad Nacional Autónoma de México	Structural geology of Mexico		
Natural Sciences	Mathematics	Juan Alfredo Tiráo	National University of Córdoba	Spherical functions and harmonic analysis		
Natural Sciences	Molecular and Cellular Biology	Armando J. Parodi	University of Buenos Aires, Argentina; CONICET	Viral gene products		
Natural Sciences	Organismic Biology and Ecology	Hugo H. Campos	Austral University of Chile	Evolutionary biology of freshwater fishes of Chile		
Natural Sciences	Physics	Miguel G. Kiwi	University of Chile	Solid-state physics		
Natural Sciences	Physics	Nicim Zagury	Catholic University of Rio de Janeiro	Elementary particle physics		
Natural Sciences	Plant Science	Miguel Holle Ostendorf	Universidad Nacional Agraria La Molina	Biosystematic studies of South American tomatoes		
Social Science	Anthropology and Cultural Studies	María Rostworowski de Diez	National Museum of Peruvian Culture	Peruvian ethnohistory		
Social Science	Anthropology and Cultural Studies	Arturo Warman	Universidad Iberoamericana	Social anthropology of Mexico		
Social Science	Economics	Víctor Jorge Elías	National University of Tucumán	Comparison of sources of growth in Latin America		
Social Science	Economics	Jorge Miguel Katz	Torcuato di Tella Institute	Technological and industrial development in Argentina since 1950		
Social Science	Economics	Paul Singer	Brazilian Center for Analysis and Planning	Tertiary sector in developing economies		
Social Science	Education	Carlos Tünnermann Bernheim	Universidad Nacional Autónoma de Nicaragua	Cultural history of the university in Latin America	Also won in 1989	
Social Science	Political Science	Oscar E. Cornblit	Torcuato di Tella Institute	Analytical studies of social and political processes in Bolivia and Argentina		
Social Science	Sociology	Francis Korn	Pontifical Catholic University of Argentina; CONICET	Social structure of Buenos Aires, 1920-1930		

== See also ==
- Guggenheim Fellowship
- List of Guggenheim Fellowships awarded in 1972
- List of Guggenheim Fellowships awarded in 1974
