= Insect behaviour =

Insect behaviour is any pattern of behaviour by insects that helps them to survive and reproduce. Aspects include behaviour patterns for feeding, avoiding predation, reproducing, migrating and navigating, communicating and living socially, and learning.

In addition, insect behaviour is modified by some parasites for their own benefit, while humans make use of some insects such as for pollination of crops and for biological control of pest insects.

== Context ==
Insects are the most diverse group of animals, with more than a million described species; they represent more than half of all eukaryote species. Their behaviour is complex and varied, and is the object of scientific study.

== Aspects ==
=== Feeding behaviour ===
Some butterflies and other insects have a puddling behaviour which may supply them with sodium ions.

Many insects create plant galls. Gall wasps lay eggs in plant tissue; the plant is stimulated chemically to create a gall, in which the egg hatches and the larva feeds and grows until it is large enough to pupate and emerge as an adult.

Numerous species of leaf-mining beetle, fly, moth, and sawfly lay their eggs in leaves. The larvae eat the tissue between the upper epidermis and the lower, forming widening tunnels within the leaf. They emerge only as adults.

Insects in many groups are predators, with specialised adaptations for catching their prey. For example, antlion larvae dig a conical pit in sand and ambush any ant that falls in with their long toothed mouthparts. Other insects actively hunt their prey: dragonflies catch prey in flight, using their speed and agility to outfly the prey and their powerful mouthparts to seize them; in contrast, female wasps (yellowjackets) use their sting, modified from the ovipositor, to inject venom, paralysing the prey.

Dung beetles collect animal dung, burying pieces of it or shaping it into balls and rolling these to their nests to feed their larvae.

Diverse insect feeding behaviours

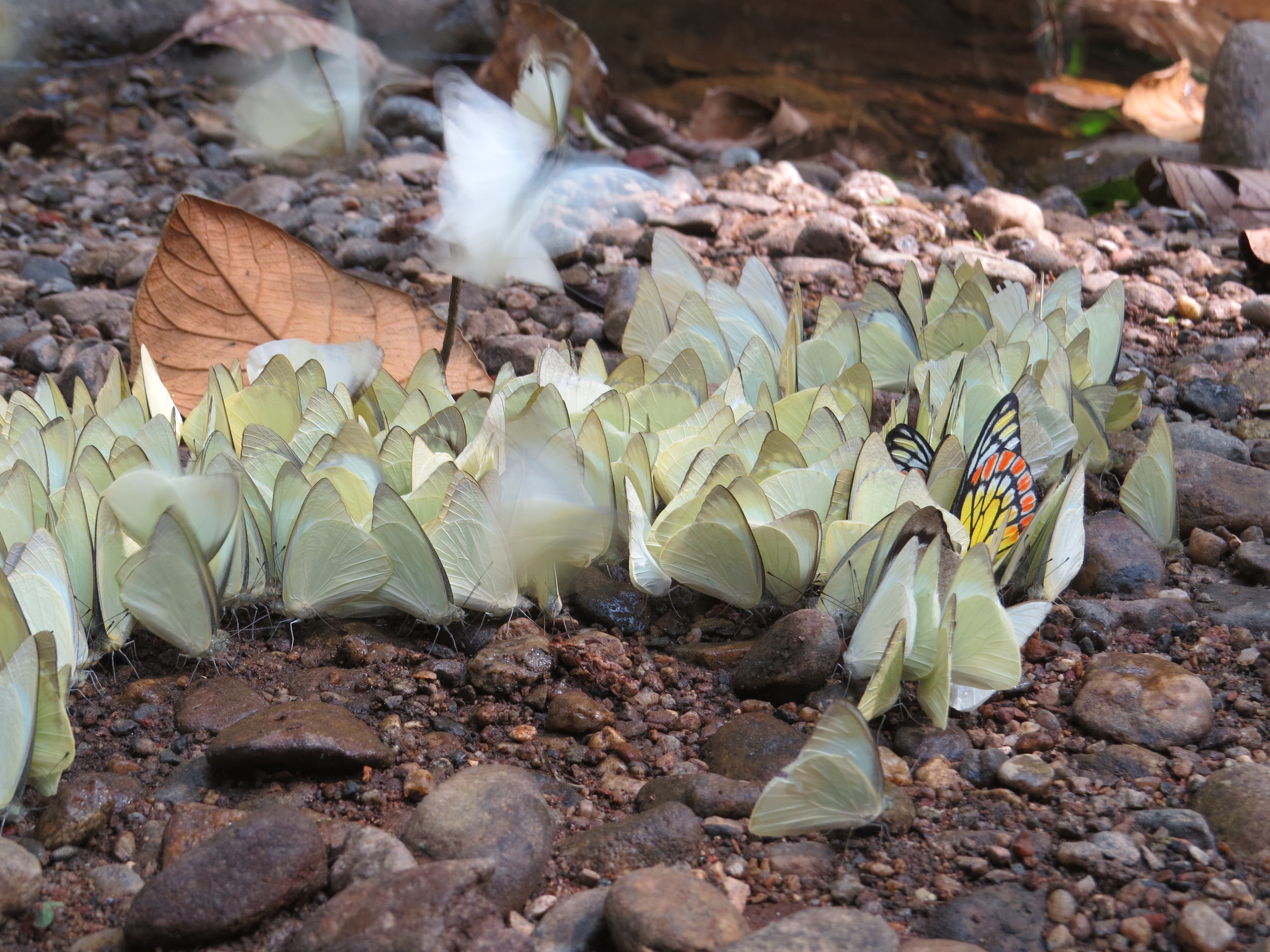
Butterflies puddling in mud

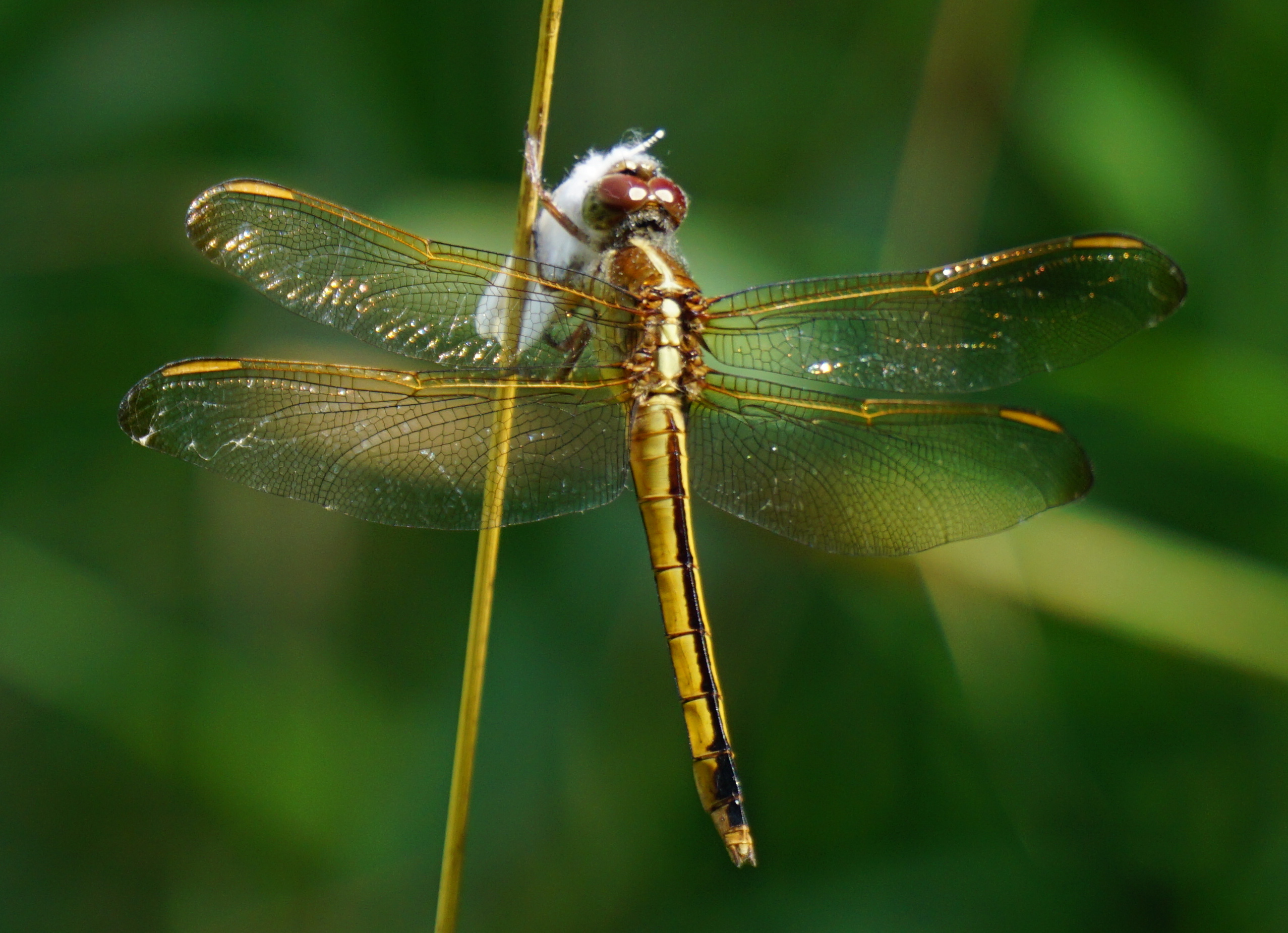
A dragonfly with captured prey (a moth)

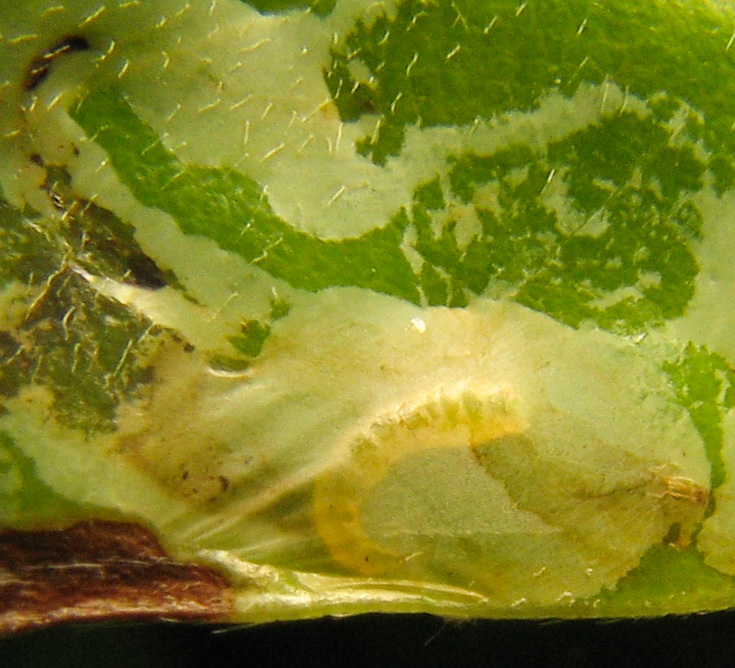
A leaf miner inside its mine under a leaf's epidermis

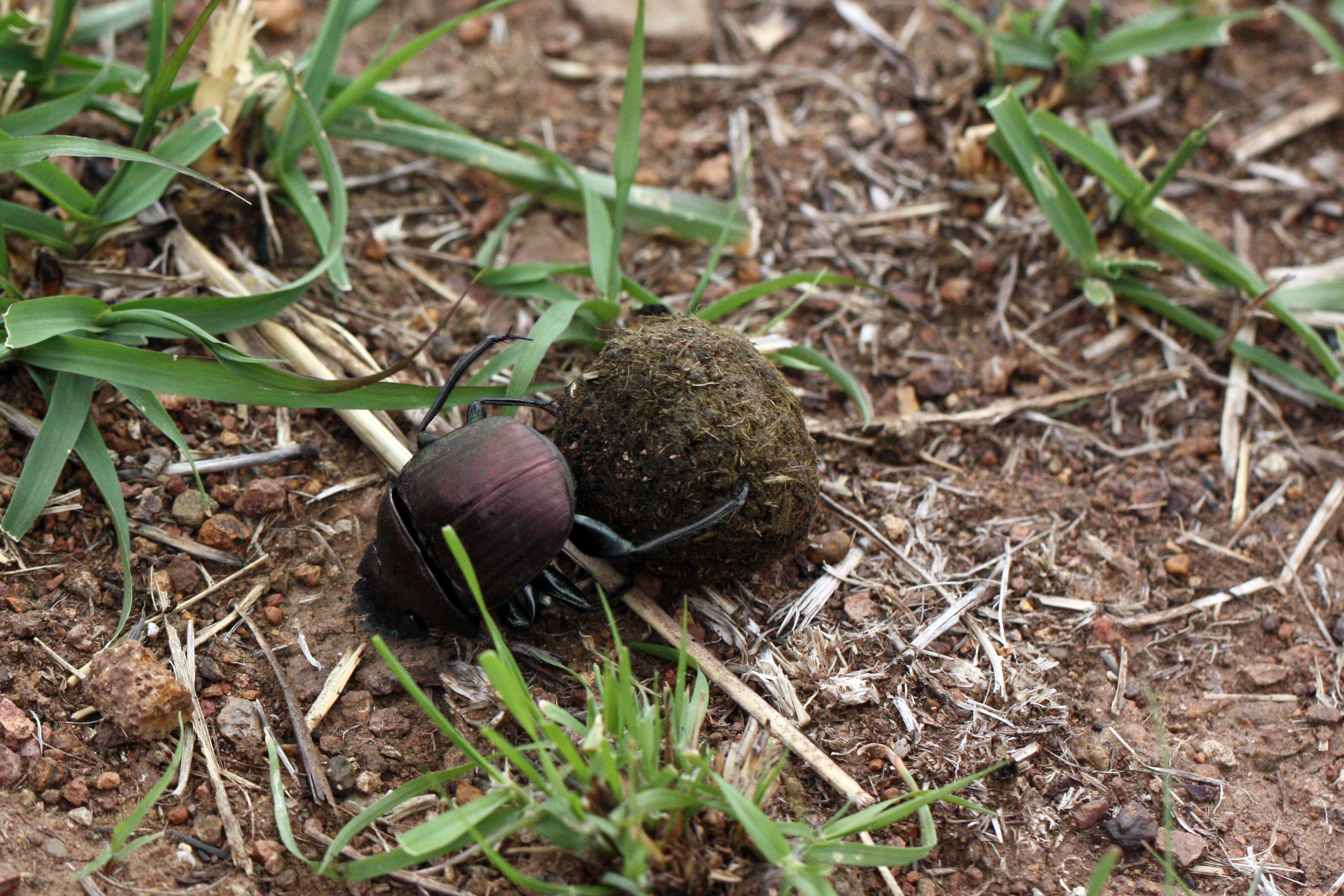
A dung beetle rolling a ball of dung to its nest

=== Anti-predator behaviour ===
Many insects have behaviours that reduce their chance of being killed by predators. Some have bluffing deimatic behaviours that attempt to scare off or startle predators, for instance with eyespots. Others signal honestly with aposematic markings that they possess defences. such as foul-tasting or toxic chemicals.

A wide range of insects are adapted instead to hide from predators, often using camouflage or mimicry. Many grasshoppers are coloured and patterned to resemble grass or stone, making them hard to see. Many edible insects such as hoverflies and clearwing moths resemble well-defended insects such as wasps, causing predators to leave them alone. Others such as spittlebugs inject air into the plants they feed on to form a froth of gluey bubbles in which they grow, out of sight.

=== Reproductive behaviour ===
Insects have several strategies for locating mates, including the use of sex pheromones, lekking, as for example in some butterflies and moths, and in honey bee nuptial swarming, and nuptial gifts.

=== Migration and navigation ===
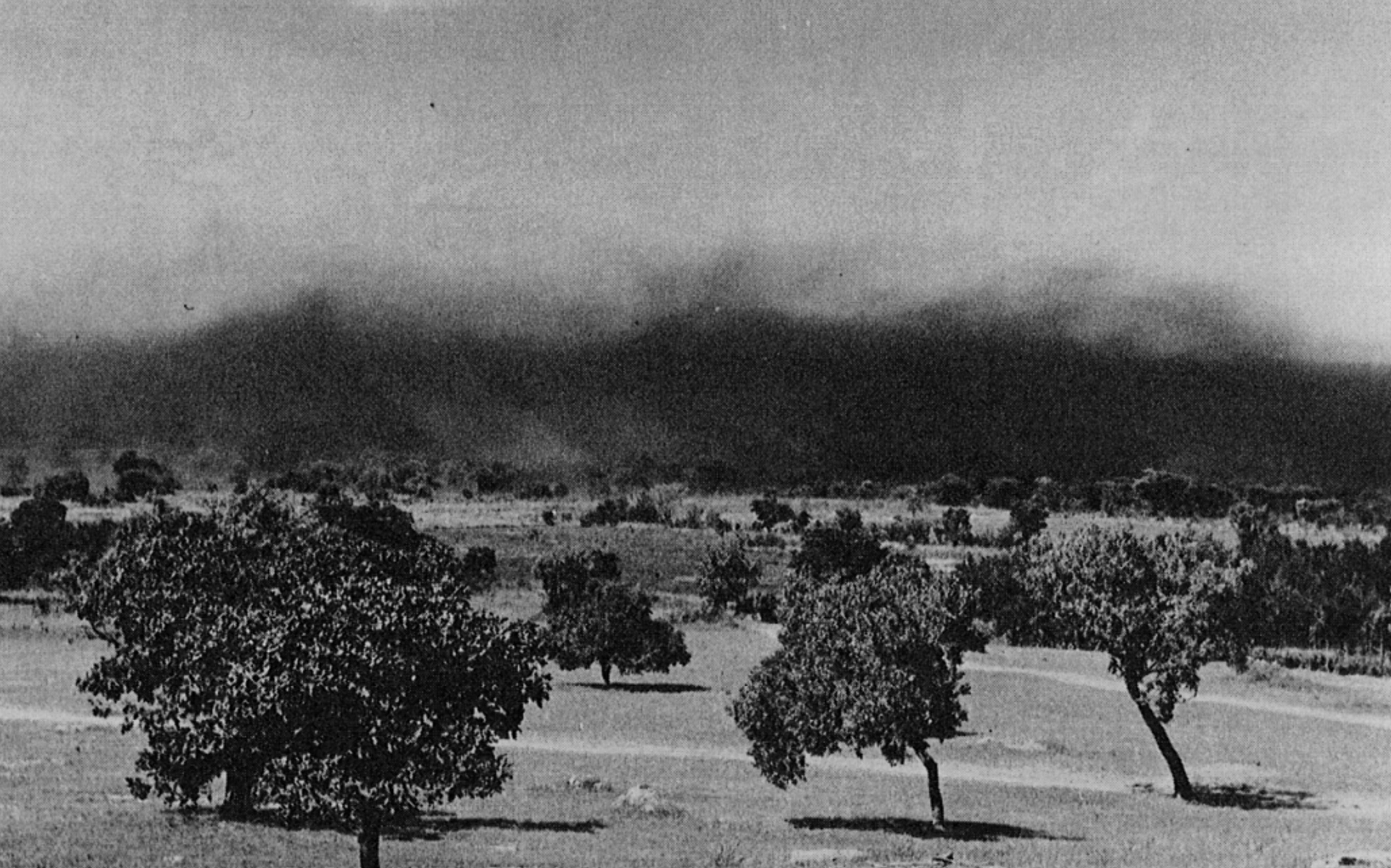
Historic image of a desert locust swarm, Morocco, in the 1950s. A mass of locusts is masking the landscape in the background like a sandstorm.

A few insects seasonally migrate large distances between different geographic regions, as in the continent-wide monarch butterfly migration involving many millions of insects.

Desert locusts may swarm when there is rain after a period of drought, leading to a rapid population buildup.

=== Social behaviour and communication ===
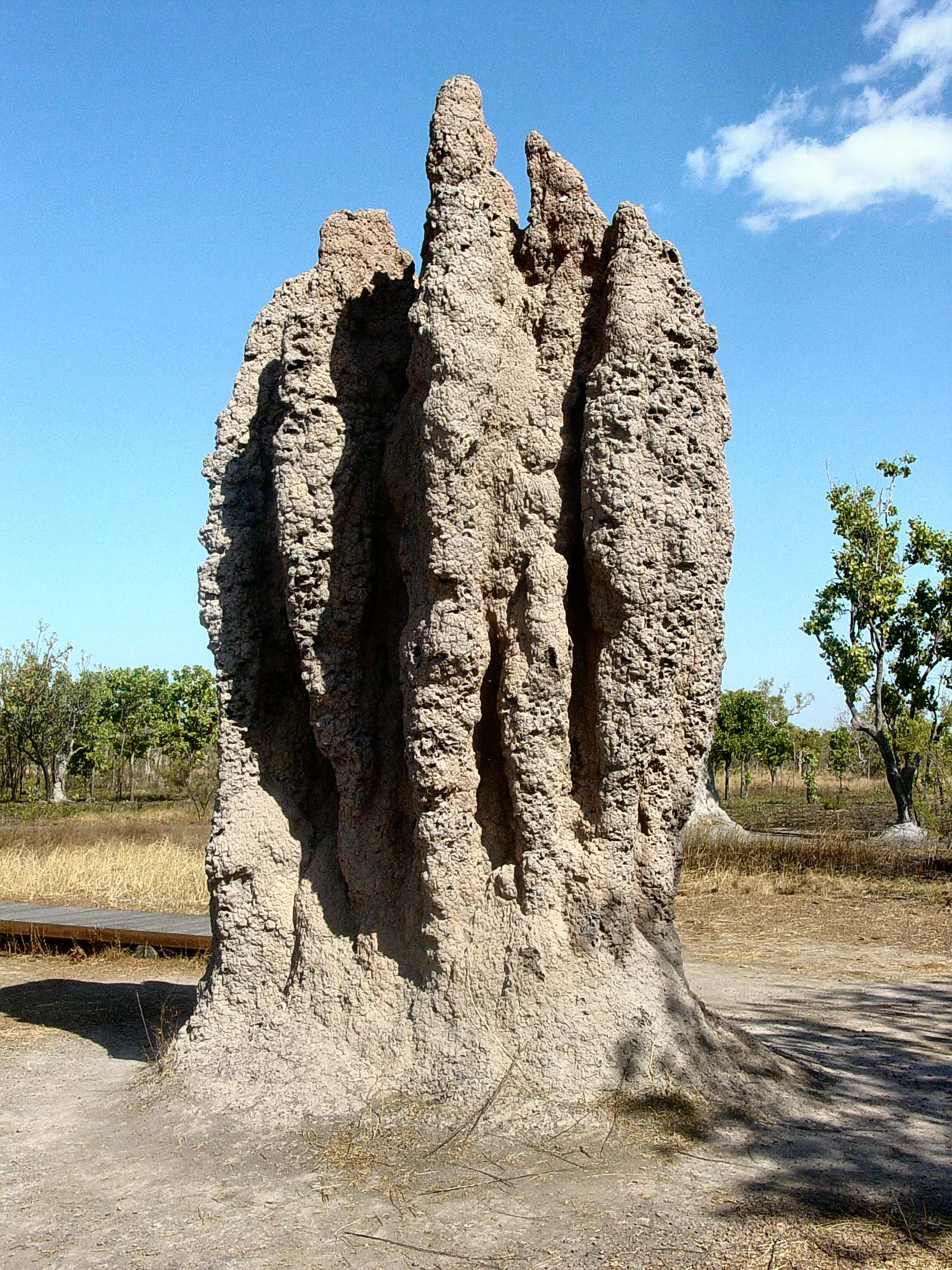
A cathedral mound created by eusocial mound-building termites.

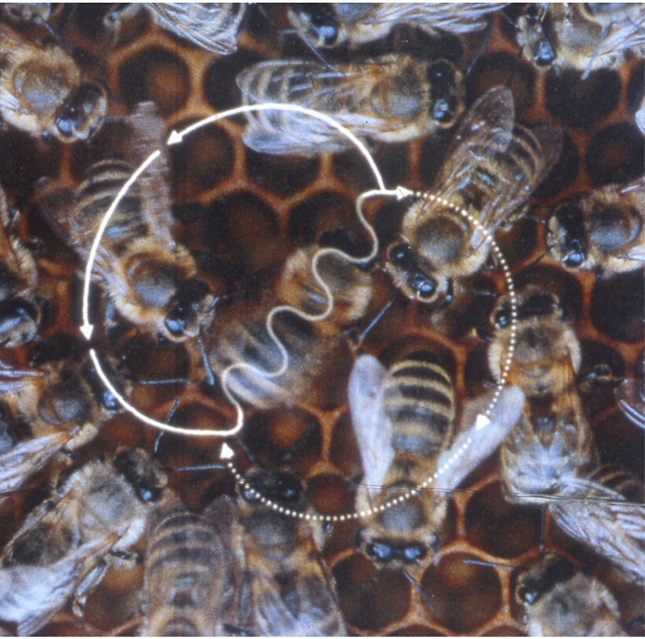
Honey bee's figure-eight waggle dance communicates the direction and range to a food source.

Social insects, such as termites, ants and many bees and wasps, are eusocial. They live together in such large well-organized colonies of genetically similar individuals that they are sometimes considered superorganisms. In particular, reproduction is largely limited to a queen caste; other females are workers, prevented from reproducing by worker policing. Honey bees have evolved a system of abstract symbolic communication where a behavior is used to represent and convey specific information about the environment. In this communication system, called dance language, the angle at which a bee dances represents a direction relative to the sun, and the length of the dance represents the distance to be flown. Bumblebees too have some social communication behaviors. Bombus terrestris, for example, more rapidly learns about visiting unfamiliar, yet rewarding flowers, when they can see a conspecific foraging on the same species.

Only insects that live in nests or colonies possess fine-scale spatial orientation. Some can navigate unerringly to a single hole a few millimeters in diameter among thousands of similar holes, after a trip of several kilometers. In philopatry, insects that hibernate are able to recall a specific location up to a year after last viewing the area of interest.

Eusocial insects build nests, guard eggs, and provide food for offspring full-time. Most insects, however, lead short lives as adults, and rarely interact with one another except to mate or compete for mates. A small number provide parental care, where they at least guard their eggs, and sometimes guard their offspring until adulthood, possibly even feeding them. Many wasps and bees construct a nest or burrow, store provisions in it, and lay an egg upon those provisions, providing no further care.

=== Cognition and learning ===
Insects use their cognitive abilities in multiple ways, such as in foraging to discover food.

=== Behaviour modification by parasites ===
Several insect parasites modify the behaviour of their hosts in a way that benefits the parasite.

== Human uses of insect behaviour ==
Pollination of flowering plants by insects including bees, butterflies, flies, and beetles, is economically important. The value of insect pollination of crops and fruit trees was estimated in 2021 to be about $34 billion in the US alone.

Insects have been used for biological control of pest insects for over a century. The cottony cushion scale Icerya purchasi was controlled in Australia from 1889 using the predatory vedalia beetle, Rodolia cardinalis. This success was repeated in California using the beetle and a parasitoidal fly, Cryptochaetum iceryae.

== Sources ==
- Córdoba-Aguilar, Alex; González-Tokman, Daniel; González-Santoyo, Isaac (2018). Insect Behavior. Oxford: Oxford University Press. ISBN 978-0-19-251809-5.
- Gullan, P. J.; Cranston, P. S. (2005). The Insects: An Outline of Entomology (3rd ed.). Oxford: Blackwell Publishing. ISBN 978-1-4051-1113-3.
- Matthews, Robert W.; Matthews, Janice R. (2009). Insect Behavior. Dordrecht New York: Springer Science & Business Media. ISBN 978-90-481-2389-6.
- Piper, Ross (2022). How to Read an Insect. The History Press. ISBN 978-1-80399-161-0.
