= Emily Watts =

Emily Watts may refer to:

- Emily Diana Watts, instructor in the Japanese art of jujitsu
- Emily Stipes Watts, American educator, writer, and literary historian
