= Peshkin =

Peshkin is a surname. Notable people with the surname include:

- Alan Peshkin (1931–2000), American educationalist
- Leonid Peshkin (born 1970), American computer scientist
