= Insect cognition =

Mental capacity of insects

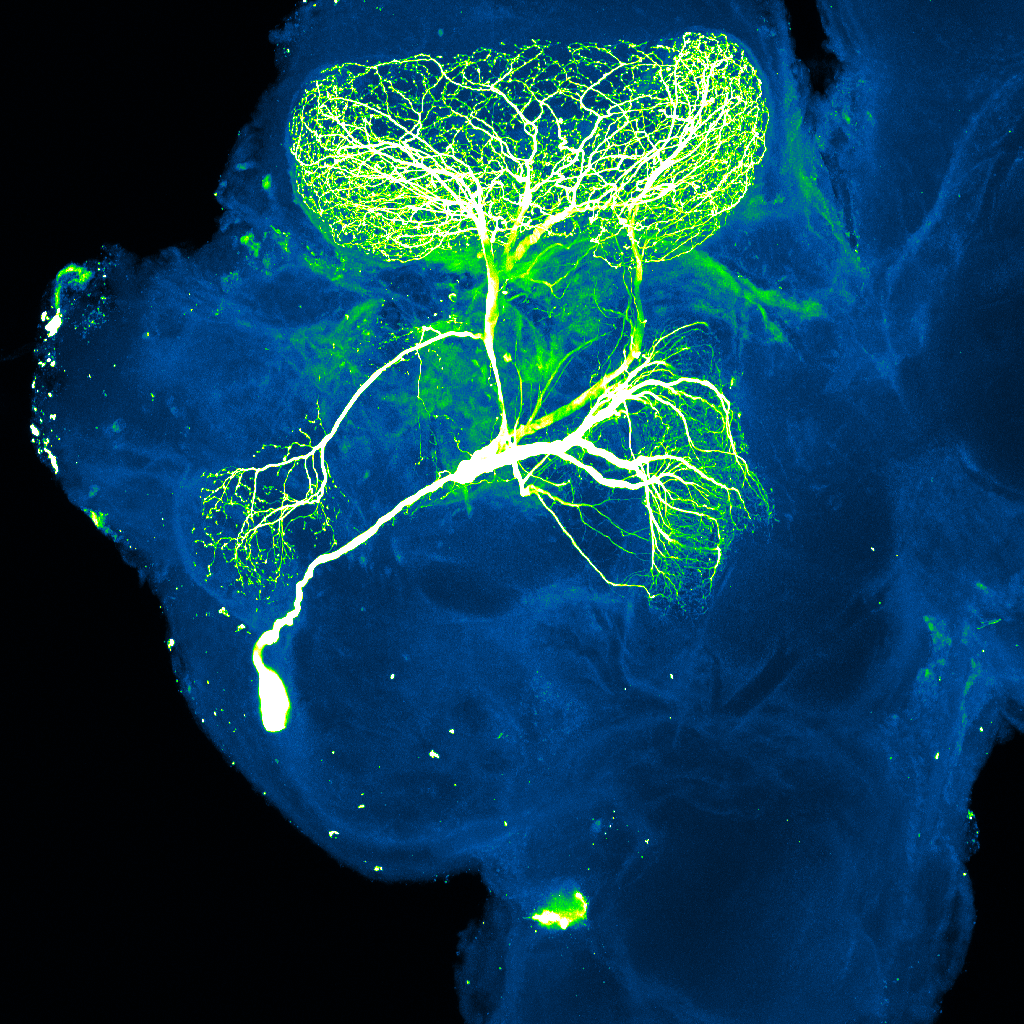
A neuron (green and white) in an insect brain (blue)

Insect cognition is mental capacity in insects, and its study. The field developed from comparative psychology where early studies focused more on animal behavior. Researchers have examined insect cognition in bees, fruit flies, and wasps.

== Research ==
Research questions consist of experiments aimed to evaluate insects' abilities such as perception, emotions attention, memory (wasp multiple nest), spatial cognition, tools use, problem solving, and concepts. Unlike in animal behavior, the concept of group cognition is important in insect studies. It is hypothesized some insect classes like ants and bees think with a group cognition to function within their societies; more recent studies show that individual cognition exists and plays a role in overall group cognitive task. One aspect is foraging cognition, in which insects use their cognitive abilities to find food.

Insect cognition experiments have become more prevalent in the 21st century. It is logical for the understanding of cognitive capacities as adaptations to differing ecological niches under the Cognitive faculty by species when analyzing behaviors, this means viewing behaviors as adaptations to an individual's environment and not weighing them more advanced when compared to other different individuals.

== See also ==
- Animal cognition
- Embodied cognition
