= God's Choice =

Book by Alan Peshkin

- Original cover
- Author: Alan Peshkin
- Subject: Weekday church schools, education philosophy
- Published: 1986 (University of Chicago Press)
- Pages: 360
- ISBN: 978-0-226-66199-5
- Dewey Decimal: 377
- LC Class: LC621

God's Choice: The Total World of a Fundamentalist Christian School is a 1986 book by Alan Peshkin and published by the University of Chicago Press. It is the product of his late 1970s 18-month ethnographic study of a 350-person Christian fundamentalist Baptist school in Illinois. He describes the K–12 day school's function as a total institution that educates about a singular truth (God's will) and subordination before God. The final chapter is a comparative analysis of the school and other schools, institutions, and social movements, wherein Peshkin concludes that the school is divisive in American society for promoting intolerance towards religious plurality. The very condition permits the school's existence.

Reviewers wrote that Peshkin's account was fair and praised his decision to let the participants speak for themselves through quotations. They also noted that the book filled a literary lacuna in scholarly understanding of the rapidly expanding and understudied fundamentalist Christian school.

== Summary ==
God's Choice: The Total World of a Fundamentalist Christian School is a 1986 book by Alan Peshkin. It is a profile of an Illinois Christian fundamentalist school—its policies, practices, and participants. Peshkin, then Professor of Education at the University of Illinois at Urbana–Champaign, intended his account to be impartial and "empathetic." He presents the fundamentalists as disciplined, dedicated, and determined with "formulas for success" opposite "fragmented and defensive" detractors. They believe in "one Truth"—God's plan—and reject philosophies of multiple truths. A teacher told Peshkin that their job is to prepare students for this "one pattern" of thought. In turn, the community's constituents do not wish to leave but appreciate conformity as an end. Peshkin describes the school as a "total institution," a place where many similar people live by their own formal rules apart from outside society, as based on Erving Goffman's 1961 essay. Peshkin asserts that this was a natural conclusion from a school "based on absolute truth." God's Choice was the third book in his series of studies on school–community relationships. It was published by the University of Chicago Press.

In 1978, Peshkin moved to an Illinois community of 50,000 people that he pseudonymically called Hartney, where he stayed and observed for 18 months. (Note: Peshkin did return home on weekends, leaving Friday night and returning for Sunday services.) He lived in an apartment within a family's home associated with what he called the Bethany Baptist church. Peshkin studied their 350-student K–12 Christian day school, Bethany Baptist Academy (also a pseudonym). The school opened six years prior with 88 students and was one of over one thousand members of the American Association of Christian Schools. The study focuses on the 125 junior–senior high school students. After a semester, Peshkin began interviewing the community members and used their quotes to let them "speak for themselves." The book includes eight portraits of students—four from faith and four "scorners" who "consciously deviate"—and student and teacher survey data, displayed in 16 tables. An appendix includes course offerings and a bibliography.

Peshkin's findings show a "total world" where the lessons of religion and education are intertwined into an "interrelated, interdependent" philosophy. The academy intends to make Christian professionals, as Peshkin describes, "a vocational school directed to work in the Lord's service." When compared to the work of public schools, the private school's instructors said both institutions impose a lifestyle and set of values as a kind of "brainwashing." Peshkin notes that while students "largely identify with" and uphold the fundamentalist teachings, they permit themselves to have "individual interpretations" and minor beliefs. Some students either dissent against the academy's rules or are regarded as too pious, but most students are moderate.

Students take classes to be effective Christian leaders, including "Bible study and 'soul-winning', English, speech, drama, and music", which are seen as important to "read and proclaim the Word." Academy teachers establish their authority through discipline and teach "the truth" as established by "facts" from the Bible. Bible passages are associated with the subject matter in a process called "integration." The academy uses science books from Bob Jones University as an alternative to books that promote secular humanism, which is described as "the 'official religion' of the public school system." The Bob Jones science books associate the Bible with science and often comment the relationship between God's intelligence and the intricacies of nature. Classes like science, social studies, and math are viewed as less important for the goal of making Christian professionals apart from their training to do "everything a sinner can do, better." Some classes are "memorization and recitation"-focused, reflecting an inelastic view of knowledge, which the academy believes to be fixed as based in biblical inerrancy. Their biggest external influence on curriculum is new books, which may affect how classes are taught, though the content ("the truth") remains the same.

In a chapter on teacher selection and training, the task of socializing students with obedience and discipline takes precedence over the task of teaching content. Students are under constant supervision to uphold a pledge to avoid outside activities such as theater, fashion, dances, and certain television shows. They also avoid some activities altogether, such as sexualized contact, drugs, alcohol, and smoking. This pledge is to be upheld at home as well, and students are encouraged to report errancies. Teachers too pledge to prioritize "the pursuit of holiness" over all things in a "born again" activity where they "confess their sins and accept Jesus Christ as their personal savior". The school is unapologetic in its insistence on "telling the kids what is right" and its according preference for lecture over discussion. Teachers are also afforded the option of corporal punishment, though it is rarely used.

The last two chapters feature Peshkin's commentary on the school in society, its tradeoffs and comparison with other total institutions and larger social movements, like the New Religious Right. He also compares the academy to public and parochial schools, wherein he finds public school students more politically tolerant and acceptant of religious pluralism. Peshkin's final reflections are written as a "cost-benefit analysis" of these Christian schools in the larger American society. In the last chapter, Peshkin contemplates how his Jewish identity is insulated within a pluralistic and secular society, and how he is fearful of absolutist "imperious, implacable logic" and "zeal for conversion and exclusivism". He recounted that while the school spoke derogatorily of non-fundamentalists and non-Christians, no one spoke of the American religious plurality that permitted this. In response to the encroaching state, fundamentalists feel that their political conviction should mirror that of their religion. Peshkin views the school as schismatic in a larger society for promoting intolerance towards fellow Americans. He also praised traits of the schools including its community, dedicated teachers, and attractive image. At the time of print, Christian schools like Bethany were outpacing the growth of other schools. In 1989, Christian schools comprised about 20% of private school enrollment—around 700,000 students.

== Reception ==
Reviewers wrote that Peshkin's account was fair in its presentation, and that his choice to let individuals "speak for themselves" through abundant quotations was a strength. They also noted how the book filled a gap in the field and that his final chapter was too moralistic.

R. Scott Appleby (American Journal of Education) wrote that Peshkin succeeded at his attempt to be impartial, and that his presentation of fundamentalist culture is made both "understandable" and, in part, "admirable." He reflected that this Christian pedagogy was closer to indoctrination than education in that it did not develop "critical skills and ... human capacities" in "open-ended" learning but professed a fixed chain of knowledge "from on high" where humans are errant and need authoritarian guidance. Appleby added that fundamentalism blames public schools and their associated state apparatus as both manufacturing enemies needed to feed its "sense of crisis" and for creating "unsafe" areas unregulated by "Christian truth." Sociologist Susan Rose "broadens the base" of God's Choice in her 1988 book Keeping Them Out of the Hands of Satan, and Appleby writes that the two books complement each other's lacunae. While God's Choice has an "engaging, sometimes riveting narrative" with vivid characters but little outside information apart from statistics, Keeping Them Out of the Hands of Satan includes extra detail on how fundamentalist groups interact and share a larger societal milieu. For example, Rose explains the difference between the "born-again experiences" of evangelicals and fundamentalists, which Peshkin glosses over.

In her own review of Peshkin's book, Rose (Contemporary Sociology) praised its "clear and detailed" contribution to the field but wished for more overview material on the Christian School Movement's rise, proponents, philosophical consistency, and "sociohistorical context". She wrote that few had studied Christian schools, the "fastest growing sector of private education in the United States." In commending Peshkin's even-handedness, she wrote that his forthrightness about declaring his own biases and effort to present participant voices through direct quotation were strong elements, though he described more than he analyzed. Rose felt that the "interesting" final chapters of analysis and comparison with public schools "grounded" the overall ethnography, though she wished for more comparison of the adolescent student experience between the academy and other kinds of American schools. She considers Peshkin's "discussion of the politics of pluralism," that Christian schools both add to American religious pluralism while advocating against it, to be his best contribution.

Jean Holm (The Times Higher Education Supplement) noted the fast growth of conservative Christian schools but added that the book was also relevant in Britain, which was experiencing similar growth. She found the first few chapters somewhat repetitive as it expressed the uniformity of the school's practices. Richard V. Pierard (Christian Century) felt that Peshkin wrote with "deep respect" for the school and its community. Still, Pierard, himself an evangelical, was "disturbed" by the community's "indoctrinated" values—"biblical absolutes" that are "part of a conservative program that has been read into Scripture." Paul F. Parsons (Christianity Today) noted that Peshkin found the school successful by traditional terms, with standardized tests, orderly climate, and "fun-loving" students, but lacking free exchange of ideas, as education is seen more as a transfer than a quest, and students do not learn "choice, doubt, suspended judgment, [or] dissent". Parsons affirmed Peshkin's findings as "remarkably representative" based on his visits to "Christian schools in 60 cities," though others are less absolutist. And while Julian McAllister Groves (Journal of Contemporary Ethnography) described the text as "beautifully written" and "poetic," he doubted whether the school's students were as converted as they said, and felt that Peshkin might have seen more "role distance" and examples of playing along simply for community acceptance had he stayed for lunch and other informal observations.
