= Nicholas Mrosovsky =

Canadian zoologist (1934–2015)

- Born: March 3, 1934; Romania
- Died: February 22, 2015 (aged 80); Toronto, Canada
- Education: Magdalene College, Cambridge; University College London
- Spouse: Sara Shettleworth
- Children: 2
- Scientific career
- Institutions: University of Toronto

Nicholas Mrosovsky (3 March 1934 – 22 February 2015) was a Canadian zoologist known for his research in the fields of homeostasis, chronobiology, and sea turtle biology. He spent his whole professional career at the University of Toronto. His laboratory was notable for its seminal investigations of the influence of behavioural arousal on circadian rhythms. He was also the founder, in 1976, of Marine Turtle Newsletter. He received a Guggenheim Fellowship in 1973, and in 1993 he was elected a Fellow of the Royal Society of Canada.

== Early life and education ==
Mrosovsky was born in 1934 in Romania, to British parents. He was educated at Winchester College in England. He received an undergraduate degree from Magdalene College, Cambridge, and a PhD from University College London. In 1967 he joined the Department of Zoology at the University of Toronto, where he spent his entire career, with cross-appointments to the Department of Psychology and to the Department of Physiology.

== Work on homeostasis ==
Much of Mrosovsky's early research was concerned with the regulation of body weight, in hibernators at first and then in other animals. Together with graduate student David Sherry and colleague Jerry Hogan, he showed that lone incubating birds lose body weight throughout incubation not because of a lack of feeding opportunities but rather because it is programmed in them, the setpoint for body weight slowly decreasing until the end of the incubation period, an adaptation to minimize the time budget conflict between feeding and incubation duties.

== Work in chronobiology ==
Mrosovky's early work on weight regulation during hibernation led to studies on circannual rhythms. With graduate student Janet Joy he found that endogenous circannual rhythms of body weight and molt in golden-mantled ground squirrels and in thirteen-lined ground squirrels could be delayed by cold temperatures in the spring, suggesting that spring temperatures in nature can help synchronize the period of circannual rhythms in hibernators to an annual periodicity.

From these first forays into chronobiology, Mrosovsky's lab developed a productive research program on circadian rhythms, specializing on how golden hamster circadian rhythms of activity could be entrained or shifted by non-photic factors such as social interaction, socio-sexual cues, and novelty-induced wheel-running. The latter factor was later shown to also be effective in a diurnal mammal, the European ground squirrel. The phase-shifting effects of strong behavioural arousal (as confirmed by running activity) is robust and further studies from the Mrosovsky lab showed that it in fact mediates the action of other stimuli on circadian rhythms, such as the benzodiazepine triazolam and pulses of darkness given on a background of constant light. He also interpreted the effects of behavioural arousal in the context of possible masking (or direct effects on the output of the circadian clock rather than on the clock itself) and of clock gene expression.

== Work on sea turtles ==
Mrosovsky's early research included the study of phototaxis, first in frogs and then in turtles. This led to his and his wife Sara Shettleworth’s experimental demonstration that young sea turtles, freshly emerged from their nest on a beach, use luminosity to find the sea, the sky over the sea always being brighter than the vegetation-rimmed beach edge inland. There followed further studies on the visual system of turtle hatchlings, and on the influence of temperature on sex ratio, nest selection, and nest emergence in sea turtles.

His interest in sea turtles expanded to issues of conservation. For more than four decades he was an active member of the IUCN-SSC Marine Turtle Specialist Group. He founded the quarterly periodical Marine Turtle Newsletter in 1976. He did not shy away from expressing contentious opinions, such as the possibility of harvesting sea turtles in a sustainable way. and a criticism of the IUCN for basing its listings of endangered species on information not publicly available.

== Awards ==
- Guggenheim Fellowship (1973).
- Fellow, Royal Society of Canada (1993).
- Canada Council Killam Research Fellowship (1994).
- Lifetime Achievement Award, International Sea Turtle Society (2008).

== Publications ==
Nicholas Mrosovsky authored four books and authored or co-authored more than 200 scientific articles. He also contributed several entries to the News & Views column of the scientific journal Nature, and numerous editorials in Marine Turtle Newsletter.

Books:

- Mrosovsky, N. (1971). Hibernation and the Hypothalamus. New York: Springer.
- Mrosovsky, N. (1983). Conserving Sea Turtles. London: British Herpetological Society.
- Mrosovsky, N. (1990). Rheostasis: The Physiology of Change. New York: Oxford University Press.
- Mrosovsky, N. (2000). Sustainable Use of Hawksbill Turtles: Contemporary Issues in Conservation. Darwin: Key Centre for Tropical Wildlife Management.

Notable papers:

- Mrosovsky, N. (1962). "Changes in multilocular brown adipose tissue in the rat following hypothermia." Nature 196: 72–73. DOI: 10.1038/196072a0
- Mrosovsky, N. (1966). "Plasticity of reactions to light in frogs and a possible role for the pineal eye." Nature 210: 1174–1175. DOI: 10.1038/2101174a0
- Mrosovsky, N. (1968) "Nocturnal emergence of hatchling sea turtles: control by thermal inhibition of activity." Nature 220: 1338–1339. DOI: 10.1038/2201338a0
- Frair, W., Ackman, R.G., Mrosovsky, N. (1972) "Body temperature of Dermochelys coriacea: warm turtle from cold water." Science 177: 791–793. DOI: 10.1126/science.177.4051.791
- Mrosovsky, N. (1977) "Hibernation and body weight in dormice: a new type of endogenous cycle." Science 196: 902–903. DOI: 10.1126/science.860123
- Mrosovsky, N., Sherry, D.F. (1980). "Animal anorexias." Science 207: 837–842. DOI: 10.1126/science.6928327
- Mrosovsky, N., Hopkins-Murphy, S.R., Richardson, J.L. (1984). "Sex ratio of sea turtles: seasonal changes." Science 225: 739–741. DOI: 10.1126/science.225.4663.739
- Mrosovsky, N., Salmon, P.A. (1987). "A behavioural method for accelerating re-entrainment of rhythms to new light-dark cycles." Nature 330: 372–373. DOI: 10.1038/330372a0
