= Maarten Chrispeels =

Belgian-American plant biologist

Maarten John Chrispeels (born February 10, 1938) is a Belgian-American plant biologist and Distinguished Professor Emeritus at the University of California, San Diego. He is known for his research on the biosynthesis of storage proteins in legume seeds and for the discovery of water channel proteins (aquaporins) in plants. He was elected to the United States National Academy of Sciences in 1996. He is an inaugural fellow of American Society of Plant Biologists. He was awarded Guggenheim Fellowships in 1973.

== Early life and education ==
He was born in Kortenberg, Belgium. He studied at the Faculty of Agriculture in Ghent, graduating summa cum laude. In 1960, he moved to the United States to pursue a Ph.D. in Agronomy at the University of Illinois at Urbana-Champaign. He completed postdoctoral research at Michigan State University and Purdue University.

== Career ==
In 1967, Chrispeels joined the newly established Department of Biology at UCSD, where he remained for over four decades. His early research focused on the secretion of hydroxyproline-rich glycoproteins in plant cells. He later investigated the biosynthesis and vacuolar targeting of storage proteins in legume seeds, elucidating the role of the Golgi apparatus in protein trafficking. His work contributed to the understanding of how proteins are modified and transported within plant cells. Chrispeels' laboratory was among the first to use transgenic plants to study protein targeting. While researching vacuolar transport signals, he and his colleagues identified aquaporins, membrane proteins that facilitate water movement across cell membranes, a discovery that advanced the field of plant-water relations.

From 1996 to 2006, he served as director of the San Diego Center for Molecular Agriculture at UCSD. For 12 years (1999-2011) he served as an advisor to the President of Chile on the Millennium Science Initiative Program and was elected as a foreign correspondent of the Academia Chilena de Ciencias. He was awarded a Doctor Honoris Causa degree by the University of Guelph, Canada.

Chrispeels co-founded two biotechnology companies. Phylogix, aimed at developing radioprotective agents for stem cells, ceased operations following funding withdrawal. In 2010, he co-founded Arterra Bioscience with Gabriella Colucci in Italy. The company focused on plant-based skincare products. After Arterra's IPO in 2021, Chrispeels sold his shares and donated the proceeds to establish an endowed professorship in plant biology at UCSD.

== Research ==
In the 1980s, Chrispeels collaborated with researchers in Australia and the United States to develop insect-resistant transgenic crops. His work on expressing a bean-derived alpha-amylase inhibitor in peas rendered them resistant to the pea bruchid beetle, marking one of the earliest successful uses of genetic engineering for pest resistance in seeds.

Chrispeels has been an advocate for the use of biotechnology in addressing global food security and environmental sustainability. He has emphasized the potential of genetically modified organisms (GMOs) to contribute to sustainable agriculture by enhancing crop yields, improving resistance to pests and environmental stressors, and reducing the reliance on chemical inputs such as pesticides and herbicides.

Chrispeels co-authored the textbook Plants, Genes and Crop Biotechnology and produced educational materials translated into multiple languages.

== Selected bibliography ==
- Martínez, Immaculada M.; Chrispeels, Maarten J. (2003-02-01). "Genomic Analysis of the Unfolded Protein Response in Arabidopsis Shows Its Connection to Important Cellular Processes[W]". The Plant Cell. 15 (2): 561–576. Bibcode:2003PlanC..15..561M. doi:10.1105/tpc.007609. ISSN 1532-298X. PMC 141221. PMID 12566592.
- Apone, Fabio; Alyeshmerni, Nicole; Wiens, Kathryn; Chalmers, Derek; Chrispeels, Maarten J.; Colucci, Gabriella (2003-10-01). "The G-Protein-Coupled Receptor GCR1 Regulates DNA Synthesis through Activation of Phosphatidylinositol-Specific Phospholipase C". Plant Physiology. 133 (2): 571–579. doi:10.1104/pp.103.026005. ISSN 1532-2548. PMC 219033. PMID 12972659.
- Apone, Fabio; Alyeshmerni, Nicole; Wiens, Kathryn; Chalmers, Derek; Chrispeels, Maarten J.; Colucci, Gabriella (2003-10-01). "The G-Protein-Coupled Receptor GCR1 Regulates DNA Synthesis through Activation of Phosphatidylinositol-Specific Phospholipase C". Plant Physiology. 133 (2): 571–579. doi:10.1104/pp.103.026005. ISSN 1532-2548. PMC 219033. PMID 12972659.
- Aroca, Ricardo; Amodeo, Gabriela; Fernández-Illescas, Silvia; Herman, Eliot M.; Chaumont, François; Chrispeels, Maarten J. (January 2005). "The role of aquaporins and membrane damage in chilling and hydrogen peroxide induced changes in the hydraulic conductance of maize roots". Plant Physiology. 137 (1): 341–353. doi:10.1104/pp.104.051045. ISSN 0032-0889. PMC 548864. PMID 15591439.
- Chrispeels, Maarten J.; Varner, J. E. (1967-03-01). "Gibberellic Acid-Enhanced Synthesis and Release of α-Amylase and Ribonuclease by Isolated Barley and Aleurone Layers". Plant Physiology. 42 (3): 398–406. doi:10.1104/pp.42.3.398. ISSN 0032-0889. PMC 1086548. PMID 16656517.
- Chrispeels, M J (1976). "Biosynthesis, Intracellular Transport, and Secretion of Extracellular Macromolecules". Annual Review of Plant Physiology. 27 (1): 19–38. doi:10.1146/annurev.pp.27.060176.000315. ISSN 0066-4294.
- Greenwood, J. S.; Chrispeels, M. J. (September 1985). "Correct targeting of the bean storage protein phaseolin in the seeds of transformed tobacco". Plant Physiology. 79 (1): 65–71. doi:10.1104/pp.79.1.65. ISSN 0032-0889. PMC 1074829. PMID 16664403.
- Maurel, C.; Reizer, J.; Schroeder, J. I.; Chrispeels, M. J. (1993). "The vacuolar membrane protein gamma-TIP creates water specific channels in Xenopus oocytes". The EMBO Journal. 12 (6): 2241–2247. doi:10.1002/j.1460-2075.1993.tb05877.x. ISSN 0261-4189. PMC 413452. PMID 8508761.

== See also ==
- List of Guggenheim Fellowships awarded in 1973
