= Emily Stipes Watts =

American academic

- Born: Emily Stipes; March 16, 1936; Urbana, Illinois, United States
- Died: March 12, 2018 (aged 81); Urbana, Illinois, United States
- Education: Smith College, University of Illinois, PhD. Arts, 1963
- Occupations: Professor of English, writer
- Spouse(s): Robert Allan Watts (30 August 1958)
- Writing career
- Period: 1963–2005
- Genres: Essays, literary criticism
- Subjects: Arts, poetry, literature
- Notable awards: John Simon Guggenheim Memorial Foundation fellow (1973-1974)

Emily Stipes Watts (March 16, 1936 – March 12, 2018) was an American educator, writer, and literary historian. In parallel with her academic career, she wrote Ernest Hemingway and the Arts (1971), The Poetry of American Women from 1632 to 1945 (1978) and The Businessman in American Literature (1982). A laureate of the Guggenheim Fellowship, she also served as chair of the Illinois Board of Higher Education.

== Early life ==
Emily Stipes was born March 16, 1936, in Urbana, Illinois, the daughter of Royal Arthur Stipes Jr. and Virginia Louise Schenck. She was a student at Smith College until 1956 and then at University of Illinois, where she obtained: a BA (1958), a MA (Woodrow Wilson National fellow, 1959), and a PhD for her thesis on Jonathan Edwards and the Cambridge Platonists (1963). She married Robert Allan Watts on August 31, 1958.

== Career ==
Stipes Watts was appointed instructor in the English language department at the University of Illinois at Urbana (1963–1967), and then assistant professor (1967–1973). In 1971, she published Ernest Hemingway and the Arts.

She was granted a John Simon Guggenheim Memorial Foundation fellowship in 1973-1974 and appointed associate professor (1973–1977), professor and director of graduate studies at the English department (1977–2005), and professor emerita since 2005. In 1978, she published The Poetry of American Women from 1632 to 1945.

Stipes Watts was appointed chairman of the Board of directors of the University of Illinois Athletic Association (1981–1983). In 1982, she published The Businessman in American Literature.

She was a member of the faculty advisory committee of the Illinois Board of Higher Education since 1984, and became its vice chairman (1986–1987), then chairman (1987–1988). Stipes Watts was also a member of the American Institute of Archaeology, the Association of Literary Scholars, Critics, and Writers, the Authors Guild, the Illinois History Society, The Philadelphia Society, Phi Beta Kappa, and Phi Kappa Phi.

== Works ==
- Stipes Watts, Emily (1963). Jonathan Edwards and the Cambridge Platonists (Thesis/dissertation). Urbana: University of Illinois. OCLC 19565369.
- Stipes Watts, Emily (1971). Ernest Hemingway and the Arts. University of Illinois Press. ISBN 978-0-252-00169-7.
- Stipes Watts, Emily (1978). The Poetry of American Women from 1632 to 1945. Austin, Texas: University of Texas Press. ISBN 0-292-76450-2.
- Stipes Watts, Emily (1982). The Businessman in American Literature. Frederick, Maryland: Beard Books. ISBN 978-1-587-98235-4.

== Bibliography ==
- Wagner-Martin, L. (November 14, 2013). Emily Dickinson: A Literary Life. Palgrave Macmillan UK. ISBN 978-1-137-03306-2. "Literary historian Emily Stipes Watts points out that during the mid-nineteenth century, people wrote poems suitable for children's reading, regardless of how that work was described. Many of Dickinson's short poems might well have been considered appropriate for children and their instruction. In Watts' words, the poems were not differentiated."
