= Sara Shettleworth =

Canadian zoologist

Sara Shettleworth FRSC
- Born: 1943 (age 82–83)
- Education: University of Pennsylvania & University of Toronto
- Occupations: Psychologist and zoologist
- Spouse: Nicholas Mrosovsky

Sara J. Shettleworth FRSC (born 1943) is an American-born, Canadian experimental psychologist and zoologist. She is professor emerita of psychology and ecology and evolutionary biology at the University of Toronto. Her research focuses on animal cognition. The Encyclopedia of Animal Cognition and Behavior said in 2017, "The emergence, over the past 25 years or so, of fields such as neuroethology, cognitive ethology, and cognitive ecology is due in no small part to her influence."

She was brought up in Maine and is a graduate of Swarthmore College in Pennsylvania. She earned her MA at the University of Pennsylvania and then her PhD at the University of Toronto, doing her doctoral studies in comparative psychology. She has lived in Canada since 1967. Until his death in 2015, she was married to biologist Nicholas Mrosovsky.

Shettleworth's research focuses on adaptive specializations of learning and the evolution of cognition.

Shettleworth has won many awards. She was honoured by the Comparative Cognition Society in 2008 for her contributions to the study of animal cognition. In 2012 the Canadian Society For Brain, Behaviour and Cognitive Science honoured her with the Donald Hebb award for her distinguished contributions to psychological science. She has been a Guggenheim Fellow and a visiting fellow at Magdalen College and Oxford University.

== Selected bibliography ==
=== Books ===
- Shettleworth, Sara J. (2013). Fundamentals of Comparative Cognition. New York: Oxford University Press. ISBN 9780195343106. OCLC 772774131.
- Shettleworth, Sara J. (2010). Cognition, Evolution, and Behavior (2nd ed.). Oxford: Oxford University Press. ISBN 9780199717811. OCLC 488647761.

=== Chapters and articles ===
- Shettleworth, Sara J. (2012). "Do animals have insight, and what is insight anyway?". Canadian Journal of Experimental Psychology. 66 (4): 217–226. doi:10.1037/a0030674. ISSN 1878-7290. PMID 23231629.
- Shettleworth, Sara J. (1 November 2010). "Clever animals and killjoy explanations in comparative psychology". Trends in Cognitive Sciences. 14 (11): 477–481. doi:10.1016/j.tics.2010.07.002. ISSN 1364-6613. PMID 20685155. S2CID 13908581.
- Sutton, Jennifer E.; Shettleworth, Sara J. (2008). "Memory without awareness: Pigeons do not show metamemory in delayed matching to sample". Journal of Experimental Psychology: Animal Behavior Processes. 34 (2): 266–282. doi:10.1037/0097-7403.34.2.266. ISSN 1939-2184. PMID 18426309.
- Miller, N. Y.; Shettleworth, S. J. (2007). "Learning about environmental geometry: An associative model". Journal of Experimental Psychology: Animal Behavior Processes. 33 (3): 191–212. doi:10.1037/0097-7403.33.3.191. PMID 17620021.
- Cheng, K.; Shettleworth, S.J.; Huttenlocher, J.; Rieser, J.J. (2007). "Bayesian integration of spatial information". Psychological Bulletin. 133 (4): 625–637. doi:10.1037/0033-2909.133.4.625. ISSN 1939-1455. PMID 17592958.
