= Hsi-Huey Liang =

Historian (1929–2004)

Hsi-Huey Liang

Hsi-Huey Liang (1929–2004) was a historian who specialised in European diplomatic, social and urban history. He taught history at Bard College, the University of California at Los Angeles , and Vassar College.

Hsi-Huey Liang was born in Germany on April 18, 1929, to Chinese diplomat, Lone Liang. He completed his early schooling part in Europe and part in China and secondary studies in Switzerland and United Kingdom. He graduated from the University of Cambridge, and completed his doctoral studies from Yale University in 1955. His works include The Berlin Police in the Weimar Republic (1970) on political and social unrest of the 1920s in Germany, The Sino-German Connection (1978) on the relations between Germany and China during the inter was period, The Rise of Modern Police and the European State System (1992), considered as his magnum opus, an analysis of the police's role in continental European politics, diplomacy, and warfare from the Congress of Vienna to the 1930s, Berlin Before the Wall: A Foreign Student’s Diary with Sketches (1990) a memoir cum historical sketch of Berlin.

The Rise of Modern Police and the European State System (1992) is considered a pioneering work on the role of police in international diplomacy and warfare, and concludes that police played a critical role shaping the interstate relations in continental Europe between the middle of the Nineteenth Century to the beginning of the Second World War.

He died in Poughkeepsie, New York, on July 25, 2004.
