= Boyd Mefferd =

American sculptor

Boyd Mefferd is an American artist born in 1941. He helped pioneer the use of electrical light in visual arts and was part of the Art and Technology movement in the late 1960s, which employed technology such as electronics, aerospace, and computers in the creation of art.

== Exhibitions ==
=== Select group exhibitions ===
Boyd Mefferd's first significant exhibition was Sound, Light, Silence, a group show in 1966 at the Nelson Gallery of Art in Kansas City, known today as the Nelson-Atkins Museum of Art. Artforum reviewed the show, which was curated by Ralph T. Coe and focused on art that employed light or sound. Mefferd's contribution was Untitled Electronic Device, a series of polished aluminum cubes with stripes of colored plexiglass, illuminated from within by sign lightbulbs.

Untitled Electronic Device was also shown in Lights in Orbit at the Howard Wise Gallery in New York, NY in 1967.

Mefferd was exhibited in The Magic Theater in 1968. Also curated by Ralph T. Coe at the Nelson-Atkins Museum of Art, this exhibit focused on environmental or "psychic" art. Boyd created an installation that employed strobe lights, titled Strobe Lighted Floor.

Mefferd was one of eight artists to represent the United States at Expo '70 in Osaka, Japan. Mefferd's contribution was Flash Walls, a new work that increased the intensity of the strobe effect he had created in The Magic Theater.

The Flash Walls were subsequently exhibited in Art and Technology curated by Maurice Tuchman at the Los Angeles County Museum of Art in 1971. The show was reviewed by Time magazine and Newsweek, among others. The concept of the exhibit paired artists with corporations, from General Electric to Disney, which contributed resources, equipment and engineering that aided the artist in achieving their vision. Mefferd partnered with Universal Television. Jack Burnham, who reviewed the show for Artforum, dubbed a subset of contributors as the "techo-artists" of the show, including Mefferd in this group.

Other notable group shows include Light: Object and Image at the Whitney Museum in 1968

=== Solo exhibitions ===
Mefferd's first solo show, Electronics, opened at the Tennessee Fine Arts Center in 1967, known today as the Cheekwood Botanical Garden and Museum of Art. He had subsequent solo shows in 1968 at the Dallas Museum of Art and the Contemporary Arts Museum Houston

== Critical reception and media ==
Strobe Lighted Floor was positively received by art critics. First exhibited in The Magic Theater, this environmental installation consisted of strobe lights enclosed in a lucite floor. As people walked through the room, the strobes fired seemingly at random, producing after-images on the viewer's retina. The effect was dream-like. Art critics called it "head art" or "objectless art," noting that Mefferd had created a way of seeing that did not involve looking directly at an object. Jane Livingston at Artforum singled out the piece as "unquestioningly the most important work in the exhibition".

Within a year of creating Strobe Lighted Floor, Jack Taylor, then assistant director of the Milwaukee Art Museum, wrote: "At the forefront and in some respects alone in experimentation and realization of the latter [environmental experience] is Boyd Mefferd."

The Flash Walls garnered similar attention from critics. Time magazine called the installation "a stunning perceptual experience. . .When [the strobe lights] flash, the effect is engulfing and somewhat unnerving: silhouettes etch themselves on the retina as on film, and afterimage sheets of brilliant color drift and flower across the entire field of vision." Newsweek said "Its impact is so strong that it seems to penetrate the mind, becoming "inner head art": close your eyes before the strobe lights and the room explodes in yellows and oranges, retinal images linger after the fact, causing your hand to reach out for companions since moved on. . . If the Krebs and Mefferd works are the most spectacular effects generated at the museum, they have lots of company in varying degrees."

In his 1973 book, Art and the Future, author Douglas Davis discussed the effect on the viewer: "Boyd Mefferd used the strobe more aggressively than anyone, surrounding his audience at the Los Angeles Art and Technology exhibition with 500 Universal television flash tubes. Their impact created 'head art' — images that danced inside the viewer's mind when he closed his eyes, often in self-defense."

Strobe-Lighted Floor continues to provoke discussion. In Mirror Affect, published in 2016, author Cristina Albu describes the installation's use of color. Red, blue, green and orange light filters covered each reflector case, coloring the after-images that the strobe lights created on the retina. Albu says this "made the viewer highly aware of the instability of perceptual processes." In 2018, the book Hybrid Practices expounded further: "Strobe-Lighted Floor immersed viewers in a space where physical coordinates seemed just as uncertain and variable as the workings of the human mind."

The documentary New Arts, created by Howard Chelsey and Eric Saarinen in 1971, discusses the work of the eight American artists exhibited at Expo '70, including the Flash Walls. Clare Spark interviewed Boyd Mefferd and Rockne Krebs for KPFK Pacifica Radio in 1971 as part of her series on the relationship between art and technology.

== Collections ==
Mefferd's works are included in the permanent collections of the Des Moines Art Center, the Walker Art Center, and the Nelson-Atkins Museum of Art.

== Awards and recognitions ==
Mefferd was recognized by the John Simon Guggenheim Memorial Foundation with a Guggenheim Fellowship in 1973.
