= History of science and technology in Argentina =

Association for Defence studies

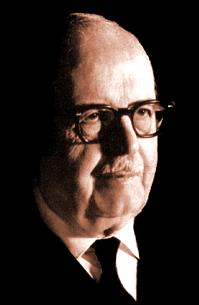
Bernardo Houssay was the first Latin American to obtain a scientific Nobel, when he was awarded the Nobel Prize in Medicine in 1947 for his work on the influence of the anterior lobe of the pituitary gland on the distribution of glucose in the body, which is important for development of diabetes.

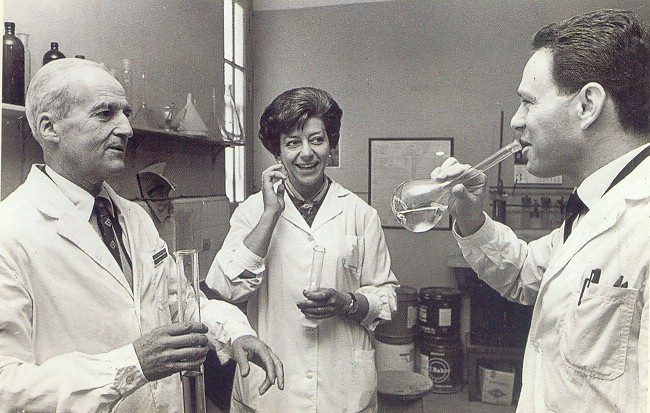
Luis Leloir (left) celebrating with his teammates the day he was awarded the Nobel Prize in Chemistry in 1970 for his discovery of nucleotide saccharides and their role in the biosynthesis of carbohydrates

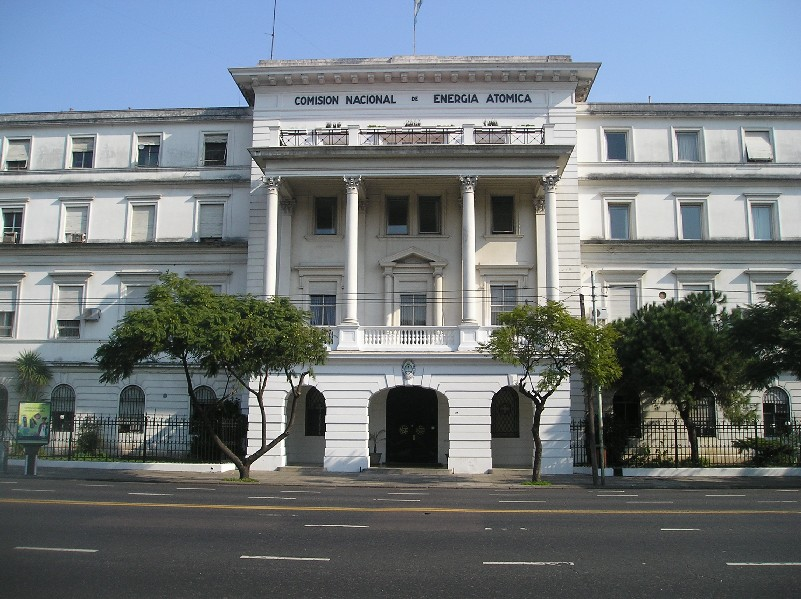
The National Atomic Energy Commission. Established in 1950, it was the first in the world outside the United States or USSR. It had created a research reactor in 1957.

The history of science and technology in Argentina covers scientific policies and discoveries made in the country.

Argentina has a long tradition in scientific research that began with the colonial universities of the Spanish Golden Age and the Jesuit scientists of the 16th and 17th centuries. Then came the astronomers and naturalists of the 19th century, such as Florentino Ameghino. With the appearance of the national universities of Córdoba (founded in 1613 and nationalized in 1854), Buenos Aires (1821), Littoral (1889), La Plata (1897) and Tucumán (1914), efforts were made to systematize and formalize scientific study.

During the post-war period, there was a transformation of the national scientific system with the establishment of CONICET, a body created on the basis of the French CNRS and charged with financing the human resources necessary for scientific research (scholarship holders and researchers). Specific organizations were also created for research in agricultural technology (INTA), industrial (INTI), nuclear (CNEA), defense (CITIDEF) and space (CNIE, now CONAE ). At the provincial level, the Scientific Research Commission (CIC) of the province of Buenos Aires was created. Argentina has a long tradition of biomedical research and has earned three Nobel Prizes: Bernardo Houssay (1947, the first in Latin America), Luis Federico Leloir (1970), and César Milstein (1984).

This period of development of the scientific system ended abruptly in 1966 with an episode known as the Noche de los Bastones Largos that caused a brain drain to developed countries. The political and ideological persecution continued until the end of the last military dictatorship in 1983. With the return of democracy, the institutional situation in science and technology organizations was normalized, again passing into civilian hands, but the sector's budget was limited. The government of Carlos Menem (1989–1999) produced new changes in the Argentine scientific system with the creation of the ANPCyT (1997), which absorbed the function of providing subsidies and credits that CONICET had previously covered. During this period, vacancies in the scientific system were almost nil, generating a new brain drain, which continued during the De la Rúa government (1999–2001) when the economic crisis came into play.

The governments of Néstor Kirchner (2003–2007) and Cristina Fernández de Kirchner (2007–2015) began to call for researchers and fellows at CONICET and the repatriation of researchers through the Raíces Program. In 2007, the Ministry of Science, Technology and Productive Innovation (MinCyT) was created to plan and coordinate the area. Until then, there had only been the Secretary of Science and Technology which had a subordinate status. The area's budget suffered significant cuts during the following government of Mauricio Macri (2015–2019) who culminated his action in science and technology with the abolition of the Ministry of Science, Technology and Productive Innovation and its demotion to the secretariat level. Access to CONICET for young researchers was again reduced, leading to a new brain drain. During Alberto Fernández's first year (2019–), the Ministry of Science, Technology and Productive Innovation was re-created, although it continues to suffer from significant budget deficits.

The main achievements during the 21st century have been in biotechnology, with the development of new transgenic varieties; nuclear technology, where the country has exported reactors to different countries through the state company INVAP; and satellite technology with the design and production of various satellites: SAC-D / Aquarius (2011), Arsat-1 (2014), SAOCOM 1-A (2018) and 1B (2020). Promotion programs have also been developed in areas considered strategic, such as informatics, nanotechnology and biotechnology.

== See also ==
- History of Argentina
- Science and technology in Argentina
