= Chemical defense in insects =

The banded orb weaving spider wraps up a large milkweed bug and subsequently cuts it from its web. This illustrates the protection the bug gained form feeding on milkweed.

Chemical defense in insects allows these small animals to ward off much larger predators.

== Biology ==
Unlike pheromones, allomones harm the receiver at the benefit of the producer. This grouping encompasses the chemical arsenal that numerous insects employ. Insects with chemical weaponry usually make their presence known through aposematism. Aposematism is utilized by non-palatable species as a warning to predators that they represent a toxic danger. Additionally, these insects tend to be relatively large, long-lived, active, and frequently aggregate. Indeed, longer-lived insects are more likely to be chemically defended than short-lived ones, as longevity increases apparency.

Throughout the arthropod and insect realm, however, chemical defenses are quite unevenly distributed. There is great variation in the presence and absence of chemical arms among orders and families to even within families. Moreover, there is diversity among insects as to whether the defensive compounds are obtained intrinsically or extrinsically. Many compounds are derived from the main food source of insect larvae, and occasionally adults, feed, whereas other insects are able to synthesize their own toxins.

In reflex bleeding, insects dispel their blood, hemolymph, or a mixture of exocrine secretions and blood as a defensive maneuver. As previously mentioned, the discharged blood may contain toxins produced within the insect source or externally from plants that the insect consumed. Reflexive bleeding occurs in specific parts of the body; for example, the beetle families Coccinellidae (ladybugs) and Meloidae bleed from the knee joints.

== Classification ==
Gullan and Cranston have divided chemical defenses into two classes. Class I chemicals irritate, injure, poison, or drug individual predators. They can be further separated into immediate or delayed substances, depending on the amount of time it takes to feel their effects. Immediate substances are encountered topographically when a predator handles the insect while delayed chemicals, which are generally contained within the insect's tissues, induce vomiting and blistering. Class I chemicals include bufadienolides, cantharidin, cyanides, cardenolides, and alkaloids, all of which have greater effects on vertebrates than on other arthropods. The most frequently encountered defensive compounds in insects are alkaloids. Class II chemicals are essentially harmless. They stimulate scent and taste receptors so as to discourage feeding. They tend to have low molecular weight and are volatile and reactive, including acids, aldehydes, aromatic ketones, quinones, and terpenes. Furthermore, they may be aposematic, indicating through odors the presence of chemical defenses. The two different classes are not mutually exclusive, and insects may use combinations of the two.

Pasteels, Grégoire, and Rowell-Rahier have grouped chemical defenses into three types: compounds that are truly poisonous, those that restrict movement, and those that repel predators. True poisons, essentially Class I compounds, interfere with specific physiological processes or act at certain sites. Repellents are similar to those classified under Class II as they irritate the chemical sensitivity of predators. Impairment of movement and sense organs is achieved through sticky, slimy, or entangling secretions that act mechanically rather than chemically. This last grouping of chemicals has both Class I and Class II properties. Again, these three categories are not mutually exclusive, as some chemicals can have multiple effects.

== Taxonomic range ==
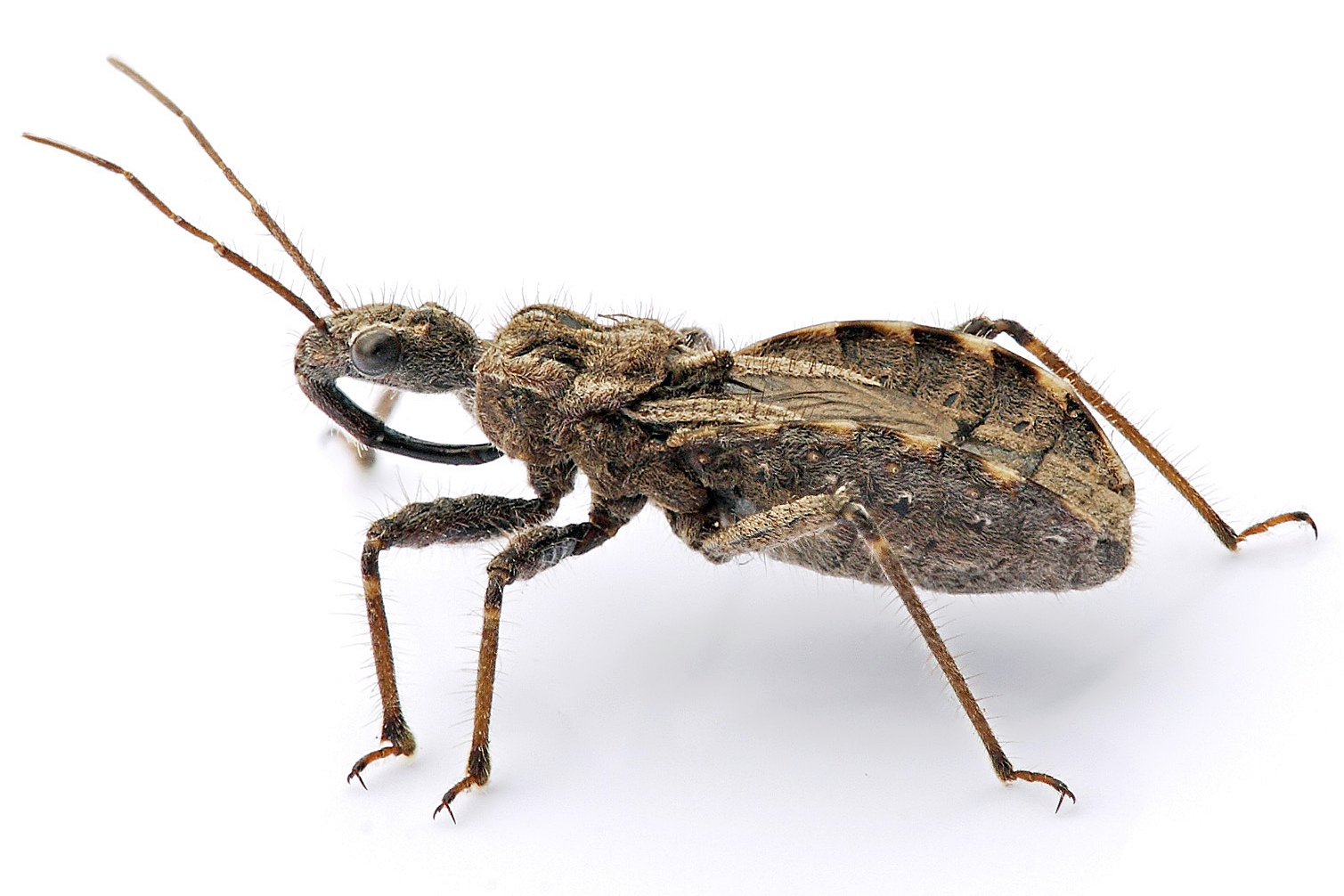
An assassin bug

A wide variety of insects possess chemical defenses, including the following groups.

=== Assassin bugs ===
When startled, the assassin bug Platymeris rhadamanthus (family Reduviidae), is capable of spitting venom up to 30 cm at potential threats. The saliva of this insect contains at least six proteins including large amounts of protease, hyaluronidase, and phospholipase which are known to cause intense local pain, vasodilation, and edema.

=== Cockroaches ===
Many cockroach species (order Blattodea) have mucus-like adhesive secretions on their posterior. Although not as effective against vertebrates, these secretions foul the mouths of invertebrate predators, increasing the chances of the cockroach escaping.

=== Termites ===
The majority of termite soldiers secrete a rubberlike and sticky chemical concoction that serves to entangle enemies, called a fontanellar gun, and it is usually coupled with specialized mandibles. In nasute species of termites (contained within the subfamily Nasutitermitinae), the mandibles have receded. This makes way for an elongated, syringic nasus capable of squirting liquid glue. When this substance is released from the frontal gland reservoir and dries, it becomes sticky and is capable of immobilizing attackers. It is highly effective against other arthropods, including spiders, ants, and centipedes.

Among termite species in the Apicotermitinae that are soldierless or where soldiers are rare, mouth secretions are commonly replaced by abdominal dehiscence. These termites contract their abdominal muscles, resulting in the fracturing of the abdominal wall and the expulsion of gut contents. Because abdominal dehiscence is quite effective at killing ants, the noxious chemical substance released is likely contained within the termite itself.

=== Ants ===
Venom is the defense of choice for many ants (family Formicidae). It is injected from an ovipositor that has been evolutionarily modified into a stinging apparatus. These ants release a complex venom mixture that can include histamine. Within the subfamily Formicinae, the stinger has been lost and instead the poison gland forcibly ejects the fluid of choice, formic acid. Some carpenter ants (genus Camponotus) also have mandibular glands that extend throughout their bodies. When these are mechanically irritated, the ant commits suicide by exploding, spilling out a sticky, entangling substance.

The subfamily Dolichoderinae, which also does not possess a stinger, has a different type of defense. The anal gland secretions of this group rapidly polymerize in air and serve to immobilize predators.

=== Leaf beetles ===
Leaf beetles produce a spectrum of chemicals for their protection from predators. In the case of the subtribe Chrysomelina (Chrysomelinae), all live stages are protected by the occurrence of isoxazolin-5-one-derived glucosides that partially contain esters of 3-nitropropanoic acid (3-NPA, beta-nitropropionic acid). The latter compound is an irreversible inhibitor of succinate dehydrogenase. Hence, 3-NPA inhibits the tricarboxylic acid cycle. This inhibition leads to neurodegeneration with symptoms similar to those caused by Huntington's disease. Since leaf beetles produce high concentrations of 3-NPA esters, a powerful chemical defense against a wide range of different predators is obvious. The larvae of Chrysomelina leaf beetles developed a second defensive strategy that is based on the excretion of droplets via pairs of defensive glands at the back of the insects. These droplets are immediately presented after mechanical disturbance and contain volatile compounds that derive from sequestered plant metabolites. Due to the specialization of leaf beetles to a certain host plant, the composition of the larval secretion is species-dependent. For instance, the red poplar leaf beetle (Chrysomela populi) consumes the leaves of poplar plants, which contain salicin. This compound is taken up by the insect and then further transformed biochemically into salicylaldehyde, an odor very similar to benzaldehyde. The presence of salicin and salicylaldehyde can repel potential predators of leaf beetles.

The hemolymph toxins originate from autogenous de novo biosynthesis by the Chrysomelina beetle. Essential amino acids, such as valine serve as precursors for the production of the hemolymph toxins of Chrysomelina leaf beetles. The degradation of such essential amino acids provides propanoyl-CoA. This compound is further transformed into propanoic acid and β-alanine. The amino group in β-alanine is then oxidized to yield either an oxime or the nitro-toxin 3-nitropropanoic acid (3-NPA). The oxime is cyclized to isoxazolin-5-one, which is transformed with α-UDP-glucose into the isoxazolin-5-one glucoside. In a final step, an ester is formed by transesterification of 3-nitropropanoyl-CoA to the 6´-position of isoxazolin-5-one glucoside. This biosynthetic route yields high millimolar concentrations of the secondary isoxazolin-5-one and 3-NPA-derived metabolites. Free 3-NPA and glucosides that derive from 3-NPA and isoxazolin-5-one also occur in many genera of leguminous plants (Fabaceae).

The larvae of leaf beetles from the subfamilies of e.g., Criocerinae and Galerucinae often employ fecal shields, masses of feces that they carry on their bodies to repel predators. More than just a physical barrier, the fecal shield contains excreted plant volatiles that can serve as potent predator deterrents.

=== Wasps ===
Ant attacks represent a large predatory pressure for many species of wasps, including Polistes versicolor. These wasps possess a gland located in the VI abdominal sternite (van de Vecht's gland) that is primarily responsible for making an ant-repellent substance. Tufts of hair near the edge of the VI abdominal sternite store and apply the ant repellent, secreting the ant repellent through a rubbing behavior.
