= Insect foraging cognition =

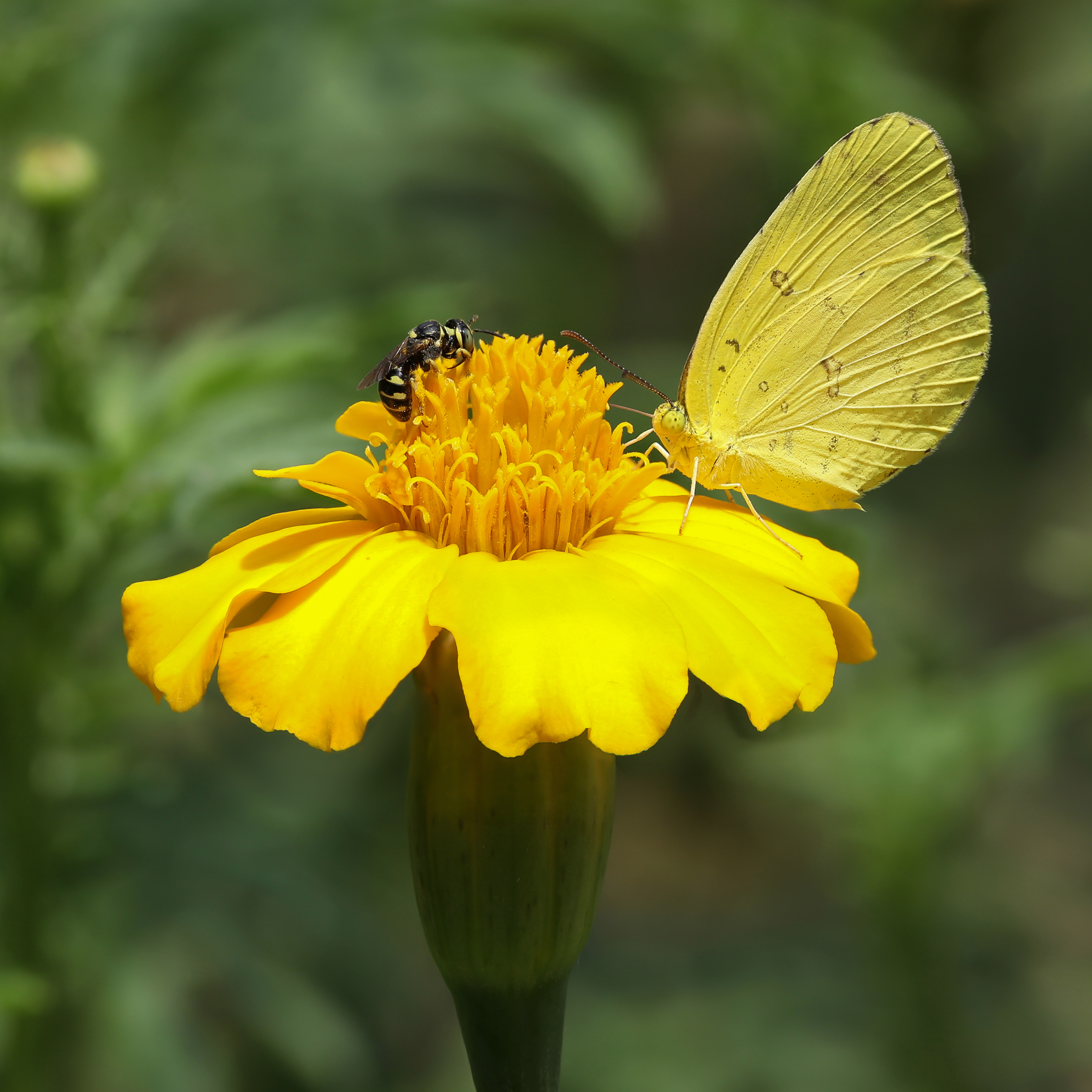
Insects foraging on a yellow flower

Insect foraging cognition is the use of an insect's cognitive abilities to find food. Insects inhabit many diverse and complex environments. Cognition shapes how an insect comes to find its food. The particular cognitive abilities used by insects in finding food has been the focus of much scientific inquiry. The social insects are often study subjects and much has been discovered about the intelligence of insects by investigating the abilities of bee species. Fruit flies are also common study subjects.

== Learning and memory ==
=== Learning biases ===
Through learning, insects can increase their foraging efficiency, decreasing the time spent searching for food which allows for more time and energy to be invested in other fitness related activities, such as searching for mates or hosts. Depending on the ecology of the insect, certain cues may be used to learn in identifying food sources more quickly. Over evolutionary time, insects may develop evolved learning biases that reflect the food source they feed on.

Biases in learning allow insects to quickly associate relevant features of the environment that are related to food. For example, bees have an unlearned preference for radiating and symmetric patterns — common features of natural flowers bees forage on. Bees that have no foraging experience tend to have an unlearned preference for the colours that an experienced forager would learn faster. These colours tend to be those of highly rewarding flowers in that particular environment.

=== Time-place learning ===
In addition to more typical cues like color and odor, insects are able to use time as a foraging cue. Time is a particularly important cue for pollinators. Pollinators forage on flowers which tend to vary predictably in time and space, depending on the flower species, pollinators can learn the timing of blooming of flower species to develop more efficient foraging routes. Bees learn at which times and in which areas sites are rewarding and change their preference for particular sites based on the time of day.

These time-based preferences have been shown to be tied to a circadian clock in some insects. In the absence of external cues honeybees will still show a shift in preference for a reward depending on time strongly implicating an internal time-keeping mechanism, i.e. the circadian clock, in modulating the learned preference.

Moreover, not only can bees remember when a particular site is rewarding but they can also remember at what times multiple different sites are profitable. Certain butterfly species also show evidence for time-place learning due to their trap-line foraging behaviour. This is when an animal consistently visits the same foraging sites in a sequential manner across multiple days and is thought to be suggestive of a time-place learning ability.

=== Innovation capacity ===
A bumblebee with experience in the string-pulling task pulls the string to reach an artificial blue flower filled with sugar solution

Insects are capable of behavioral innovation, creating new or modified learned behavior not previously found in the population. Innovative abilities can be experimentally studied in insects through the use of problem solving tasks. When presented with a string-pulling task, many bumblebees cannot solve the task, but a few can innovate the solution.

Those that initially could not solve the task can learn to solve it by observing an innovator bee solving the task. These learned behaviors can then spread culturally through bee populations. Studies in insects have begun to look at what traits (e.g. exploratory tendency) predict the propensity for an individual insect to be an innovator.

== Social aspects of insect foraging ==
=== Social learning of foraging sites ===
Insects can learn about foraging sites through observation or interaction with other individuals, termed social learning. This has been demonstrated in bumblebees. Bumblebees become attracted to rewarding flowers more quickly if they are occupied by other bumblebees and more quickly learn to associate that flower species with reward. Seeing a conspecific on a flower enhances preferences for flowers of that type. Additionally, bumblebees will rely more on social cues when a task is difficult compared to when a task is simple.

Ants will show conspecifics food sites they have discovered in a process called tandem running. This is considered to be a rare instance of teaching, a specialized form of social learning, in the animal kingdom. Teaching involves consistent interactions between a tutor and a pupil and the tutor typically incurs some sort of cost in order to transmit the relevant information to the pupil. In the case of tandem running the ant is temporarily decreasing its own foraging efficiency in order to demonstrate to the pupil the location of a foraging site. This concept in humans would be similar to the apprenticeship system.

=== Evidence for cumulative culture ===
Studies in bumblebees have provided evidence that some insects show the beginnings of cumulative culture through the act of refining existing behaviours into more efficient forms. Bumblebees are able to improve upon a task where they must pull a ball to a particular location, a previously socially learned behaviour, by using a more optimal route compared to the route that their demonstrator used. This demonstration of refinement of a previously observed existing behaviour could be considered a rudimentary form of cumulative culture, although this is a highly controversial idea. It is important to say that true cumulative culture has been difficult to show in insects and indeed, in all species. This would require culture accumulating over generations to the point where no single individual could independently generate the entire behaviour.

== Neural basis of insect foraging ==
=== Role of mushroom bodies ===
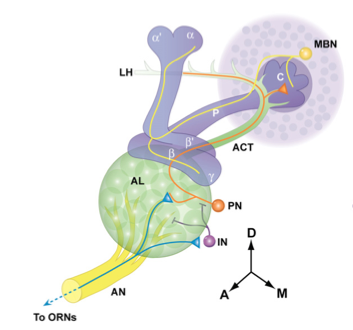
A diagram of a fruit fly mushroom body

One important and highly studied brain region involved in insect foraging are the mushroom bodies or corpora pedunculata, structures implicated in insect learning and memory abilities. The mushroom body consists of two large stalks called peduncles which have cup-shaped projections on their ends called calyces. The role of the mushroom bodies is in sensory integration and associative learning. They allow the insect to pair sensory information and reward.

When the function of the mushroom bodies is destroyed through ablation, the affected insects are behaviourally normal but have impaired learning. Flies with impaired mushroom bodies cannot form an odour association and cockroaches with impaired mushroom bodies cannot make use of spatial information to form memories about locations. Electrophysiological underpinnings of the cognition in different parts of the insect brain can be studied by various techniques including in vivo recordings from these parts of the insect brain.

==== Mushroom body plasticity ====
Mushroom bodies can change in size throughout the lifespan of an insect. There is evidence these changes are related to the onset of foraging as well as the experience of foraging. In some Hymenoptera mushroom bodies increase in size when nurses become foragers and begin to forage for the colony.

Young bees begin as nurses tending to the feeding and sanitation of the hive's larvae. As a bee ages it undergoes a shift in tasks from nurse to forager, leaving the hive to collect pollen. This shift in job leads to changes in gene expression within the brain which are associated with an increase in mushroom body size.

Some butterflies have also been shown to undergo an experience-dependent increase in mushroom body size. The period of greatest increase in brain size typically is associated with a period of learning through experiences with foraging demonstrating the importance of this structure in insect foraging cognition.

=== Mushroom body evolution ===
Multiple insect taxa have independently evolved larger mushroom bodies. The spatial cognition demands of foraging has been implicated in cases where more sophisticated mushroom bodies have evolved. Cockroaches and bees, which are in different orders, both forage over a large area and make use of spatial information to return to foraging sites and central places which likely explains their larger mushroom bodies. Contrast this with a dipteran such as the fruit fly Drosophila melanogaster, which has relatively small mushroom bodies and less complex spatial learning demands.
