= Francis Korn =

Argentine sociologist (1935–2024)

- Born: Silvia Francis Korn Litichver; 14 July 1935
- Died: 15 March 2024 (aged 88); Buenos Aires, Argentina
- Occupation: Sociologist
- Spouse: Ezequiel Gallo
- Children: At least 1
- Awards: Guggenheim Fellowship (1973)

Academic background
- Education: University of Buenos Aires; London School of Economics; St Anne's College, Oxford
- Thesis: The scientific status of Lévi-Strauss's theory of kinship (1974)

Academic work
- Discipline: Sociology
- Sub-discipline: Sociological theory; History of Buenos Aires
- Institutions: Pontifical Catholic University of Argentina; National Scientific and Technical Research Council; University of Essex; Torcuato di Tella University

Silvia Francis Korn Litichver (14 July 1935 – 15 March 2024) was an Argentine sociologist. The first Argentine anthropology doctoral graduate of the University of Oxford, she worked as a professor at the University of Buenos Aires, the University of Essex, and the Torcuato di Tella University. A 1973 Guggenheim Fellow and 2004 elected member of the National Academy of Sciences of Buenos Aires, she wrote on sociological theory and the history of Buenos Aires, including her 1973 book Elementary Structures Reconsidered.

== Biography ==
=== Early life and education ===
Silvia Francis Korn Litichver was born on 14 July 1935. She was one of three children of Cecilia (née Litichver) and magazine editor Julio Korn, and her paternal grandfather was a Bessarabian Jewish immigrant. One of her given names, Francis, was in honour of the French Revolution.

Korn was educated at the University of Buenos Aires (UBA), obtaining her licentiate in sociology in 1963. After spending a year at UBA as a sociology lecturer (1965–1966), she later moved to the United Kingdom, where she obtained her Master in Teaching degree at the London School of Economics in 1966. In 1970, she obtained her PhD in social anthropology at St Anne's College, Oxford, becoming Oxford University's first Argentine anthropology doctoral graduate. Her doctoral dissertation was titled The scientific status of Lévi-Strauss's theory of kinship.

=== Academic career ===
In 1970, Korn returned to UBA as chair of the department of sociology and as professor, serving in these positions until 1971 and 1972, respectively. After working as an associate at the Torcuato di Tella Institute from 1971 until 1972, she began working as professor of sociology at Pontifical Catholic University of Argentina and as a National Scientific and Technical Research Council investigator in 1972, before eventually becoming an emeritus researcher at the latter. She later started working at UBA as a professor, as well as at the University of Essex and the Torcuato di Tella University (UTDT), remaining at the latter until 2015. She was also the director of the Torcuato di Tella Institute Centre for Social Research and the National Academy of Sciences of Buenos Aires Institute for Social Research.

Korn's research was based on sociological theory and the history of Buenos Aires, particularly from 1880 until 1945. In 1973, she published the book Elementary Structures Reconsidered, focusing on Claude Lévi-Strauss' kinship theories and based on her own Oxford thesis, and she was appointed a Guggenheim Fellow "for a study of the social structure of Buenos Aires, 1920–1930". Daniel Gigena of La Nación said that "she stood out as one of the intellectuals of the golden age of the world of ideas in Argentina from the 1960s onwards". In 2004, she was elected to the National Academy of Sciences of Buenos Aires. Her books on the history of Buenos Aires included Buenos Aires: los invitados del 20 (1974), Buenos Aires, 1895: una ciudad moderna (1981), Buenos Aires: mundos particulares (2004), and Buenos Aires antes del Centenario (2010), and at the time of her death, she had been working on a book about the history of Buenos Aires from 1932 to 1938, which was later left with a friend of hers, author Martín Oliver.

=== Personal life and death ===
Korn's husband Ezequiel Gallo was a historian and also a UTDT professor himself, as is her son Klaus Gallo.

In addition to academia, Korn also wrote short stories, published in a book titled Más Amalias de las que se puede tolerar. She was an opponent of the politicization of sociology.

Korn died on 15 March 2024 in Buenos Aires; she was 88.

== Bibliography ==
- Elementary Structures Reconsidered (1973)
- (ed.) Los Italianos en la Argentina (1983)
