= Armando J. Parodi =

Argentine glycobiologist

Armando J. Parodi (born March 16, 1942) is an Argentine glycobiologist. He did his initial education at the School of Sciences of the University of Buenos Aires. His PhD work was done under Luis Federico Leloir, a recipient of the Nobel Prize in Chemistry for his work involving the finding of sugar nucleotides and how they play a role in the making of oligosaccharides and polysaccharides. He also pursued postdoc work at the Pasteur Institute in Paris, France and Duke University in Durham, NC, USA.

== Early life and education ==
Although his father was a physician who worked more in academia than in a clinic, the lack of strong science teachers in secondary school led him to become more interested in politics. However, when he graduated high school, Parodi attended the School of Sciences at the University of Buenos Aires. The reason for this, was his interest in Chemistry that developed as a result of having a Chemistry teacher in secondary school that excited him about the subject. Due to the restructuring of the Higher Education system as a result of Juan Perón’s dictatorship, many of his professors were younger and recent graduates of post-doctoral programs in the US and Europe. During his final year at the University of Buenos Aires, his father suggested that he should pursue his PhD at the Fundación Instituto Leloir, and so he enrolled in the Biochemistry course there. While working under Luis F. Leloir, Parodi saw that Leloir was able to synthesize particulate glycogen in vitro and that influenced the direction of his future research.

Parodi also completed a 2-year postdoctoral fellowship at the Pasteur Institute in Paris, France.

== Research and career ==
While working under Luis F. Leloir, Parodi's research was involved with the synthesis of particulate glycogen de novo using UDP-Glc and rat livers for glycogen synthase. In 1970, he joined Leloir and Nicolas Behrens in their research that was involved with the incubation of dolichol-P-Glc using liver microsomes to transfer glucose to a dolichol-P-P-linked glycan known as Glc3Man9GlcNAc2-P-P-dolichol.

After completing his fellowship in Paris, and returning to Buenos Aires, between the years of 1975 and 1978, he conducted research involved with demonstrating the presence of a dolichol-P-dependent pathway of N-glycosylation in yeast. However, a paper in 1980 that stated the lack of free or sugar-bound dolichol-P in trypanosomatid protozoa meant that the pathway he discovered was not in the organism. This lead him to do his own research with trypanosomatids and using ^{14}C Glucose he found that the synthesis of dolichol-P-P-glycans in protozoa was possible but glucose was lacking in the formed glycans.

Further research into glycans in trypanosomes, specifically Trypanosoma cruzi, was conducted by Parodi. Using short pulses of ^{14}C, three protein glycans were produced and they were known as Glc_{1}Man_{9}GlcNAc_{2}, Glc_{1}Man_{8}GlcNAc_{2}, and Glc_{1}Man_{7}GlcNAc_{2}. These were then replaced by Man_{9}GlcNAc_{2}, Man_{8}GlcNAc_{2}, Man_{7}GlcNAc_{2}, and Man_{6}GlcNAc_{2} in the mature versions of the glycoproteins. This led to the conclusion that the transfer of a glucose to the Man_{9}GlcNAc_{2} was the only way that Glc_{1}Man_{9}GlcNAc_{2} could have been made.

Parodi also looked into how glucosylation/deglucosylation in the lumen of the endoplasmic reticulum were involved with the correct folding of N-linked glycoproteins. His research led him to find that misfolding allowed for conformations that would allow for glycoproteins to act as glucose acceptors. He was able to find this using UDP-Glc: glycoprotein GT that worked as ways of sensing the various conformations of the glycoproteins. The sensitive of GT was very helpful as it was able to detect formations that were undetectable via other methods. This work was crucial in discovering how protein folding was controlled. By looking at how GT encouraged proper folding, the enzyme was found as a stress protein and there was increased synthesis of it during periods of stress for the endoplasmic reticulum.

Recent work by Parodi has looked at how Glucosidase I removes glucose from Glc3Man9GlcNAc2. He has looked at how glycosylation MOGS-CDG leads to Glucosidase 1 encoding gene mutations. Absence of this GI has been linked to death in certain yeasts, specifically, Schizosaccharomyces pombe. Parodi and his team wanted to look at this mutation and understand what was causing the defects in these Δgls1-S cells.

=== Awards and honors ===
- “Bernardo Houssay” Award in Biology (National Council of Scientific and Technical Research, Argentina, 1987)
- Award in Biology (Third World Academy of Sciences, Trieste, Italy, 1994)
- International Research Scholar, Howard Hughes Medical Institute (1997–2011)
- Award Venancio Deulofeu in Chemistry and Biochemistry of Carbohydrates, National Academy of Exact, Physical and Natural Sciences (1998)
- Honorary Member, Spanish Society of Biochemistry and Molecular Biology (2001)
- Konex Platinum Award in Science and Technology-Biochemistry and Microbiology (1993–2002). Konex Foundation, Buenos Aires (2003)
- Bunge y Born Foundation Award in Biological Chemistry (2005)
- Karl Meyer Award in Glycobiology (2011)
