= Alan Peshkin =

Former Stanford University professor

Alan "Buddy" Peshkin (1931 – December 7, 2000) was Professor of Education at Stanford University. He was awarded a Guggenheim Fellowship in 1973.

== See also ==
- God's Choice
